= Central Susquehanna Valley Thruway =

Highway under construction in Pennsylvania

- CSVT mainline highlighted in red PA 61 connector highlighted in blue

Route information
- Maintained by PennDOT
- Length: 10.844 mi (17.452 km)
- Existed: August 2022–present
- History: Northern segment opened in 2022
- Component highways: PA 147 from Winfield to West Chillisquaque Township

Major junctions
- South end: US 15 in Union Township
- PA 405 in Point Township
- North end: PA 147 in West Chillisquaque Township

Location
- Country: United States
- State: Pennsylvania

Highway system
- Pennsylvania State Route System; Interstate; US; State; Scenic; Legislative

The Central Susquehanna Valley Thruway (CSVT), also known as the Central Susquehanna Valley Transportation Project, is a partially-completed 10.84-mile (17.45 km) highway bypass along the U.S. Route 15 (US 15) corridor near Shamokin Dam, Pennsylvania. It has been designated as part of Corridor P-1 of the Appalachian Development Highway System by the Appalachian Regional Commission. When complete, it will carry US 15 and Pennsylvania Route 147 (PA 147) over varying stretches of its length. The project includes the construction of a new bridge over the West Branch Susquehanna River and 11.7 miles (18.8 km) of new roadway, including a short freeway connection to PA 61.

The first phase of the project, connecting US 15 in Winfield with PA 147 near Montandon, opened in August 2022. The southern section is expected to open in 2027, with an additional connector in 2028.

== History ==
Near Selinsgrove, PA, U.S. 11/15 are routed along a freeway-grade bypass. However, just north of the town, at Hummels Wharf, the freeway ends at a partially abandoned interchange with U.S. 522. Here, U.S. 11/15 transfers to surface streets. A bypass around the community was originally planned; the study was completed in 1959, but the idea was abandoned in 1978 when funding ran out.

Previously, completion of the bypass had been considered as part of a proposal to extend Interstate 83 from its current terminus at Interstate 81 just north of Harrisburg, Pennsylvania to Interstate 86/NY 17 in Corning, New York, but with the establishment of U.S. 15 north of Williamsport, Pennsylvania as part of the Interstate 99 corridor, this concept was dropped. Without additional reconstruction of U.S. 22/322 and U.S. 11/15 south of Selinsgrove, the farthest I-83 could currently be extended would be just across the Clarks Ferry Bridge (which currently carries U.S. 22/322 across the Susquehanna River) to an at-grade intersection with PA 849 near Duncannon.

=== Revival ===
In the mid-2000s, interest in the bypass was revived as part of a plan for a continuous highway from the Harrisburg area, north to Williamsport. Part of this may be due to the late 2000s emergence of natural gas drilling in the Marcellus shale in the northern tier of the state. Due to the natural gas boom and increased logistical demands associated with it, Mark Murawski of the Route 15 Coalition estimates that traffic will triple along the route. U.S. Route 15 north of Williamport has also been upgraded to interstate standards as a part of the future Interstate 99 resulting in an increase in traffic along the U.S. Route 15 corridor.

=== Funding ===
Former Pennsylvania Governor Ed Rendell is reported to have promised $51 million for the project, but his term in office expired before any of the money was allocated. On April 3, 2013, PennDOT announced that the state would commit to allocate $558 million for the project over the following 10 years, pending approval by the General Assembly.

The project was included in the proposed $1.8 billion FY 2014 Pennsylvania transportation budget; however, that budget was not approved, creating further uncertainty for the project. A $2.3 billion budget was later passed by the General Assembly and signed by then-Governor Tom Corbett, granting over $500 million for the Thruway, as well as funding other major transportation projects in the state. In December, 2022, the project received $63 million in federal aid from the Infrastructure Investment and Jobs Act (IIJA).

=== Construction ===
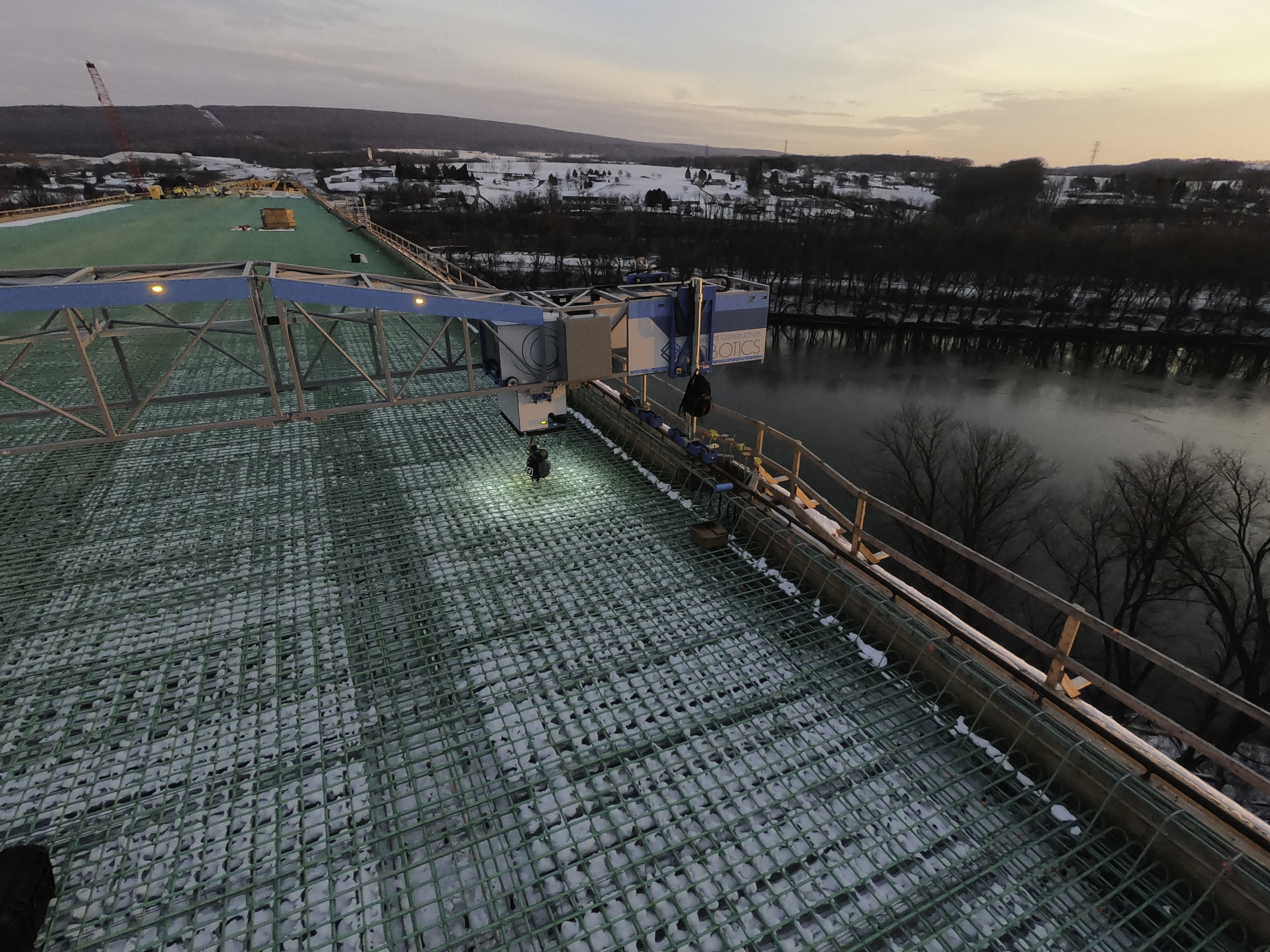
Central Susquehanna Valley Thruway bridge over the Susquehanna River under construction

The project is expected to take approximately 11 years to construct, with an expected substantial completion date of 2027. The project is divided into two major sections, plus an additional connector.

The Northern Section reached completion first. The first contract, for the bridge over the West Branch Susquehanna River, was awarded in August 2015, with construction of the bridge commencing the following year. This was followed soon after by a second contract for smaller spans north of the main bridge. Construction on the bridge over the West Branch Susquehanna River took place and, as of late 2018, was about 75% complete. In 2020, construction of the bridge was completed. On June 25, 2022, about 6,000 people toured the bridge over the West Branch Susquehanna River bridge via foot and bicycle ahead of it opening to traffic. A ribbon-cutting ceremony to mark the completion of the northern section was held on June 29, 2022, with U.S. Senator Bob Casey Jr., U.S. Representative Fred Keller, and state and local politicians and officials in attendance. The northbound lanes of the northern section of the Central Susquehanna Valley Thruway running from US 15 north across the river to PA 147 opened to traffic on July 7, 2022, with the southbound lanes opening the following day. Construction of the entire northern section was finished by the end of 2022. With the opening of the northern section, PA 147 was rerouted to follow the Central Susquehanna Valley Thruway to US 15, where it continues south concurrent with US 15 and PA 61 to rejoin its original alignment in Sunbury, while PA 405 was extended south along the former alignment of PA 147 to PA 61 in Sunbury.

Construction of the Southern Section – south of Winfield – was delayed when coal ash ponds on the route were found to be unsuitable for supporting surface highway construction. The design was revised to avoid the ash basins. Construction of the southern section began in 2022 and is expected to be completed in 2027.

The Route 61 Connector is expected to be completed in 2028.

== Route description ==
The currently opened section of the highway begins just south of Chillsquaque, where PA 147 had formerly intersected PA 405 and downgraded from the existing divided highway segment to its surface alignment. The freeway continues south from here as PA 147, running parallel to PA 405, which has replaced PA 147 along its old alignment to Northumberland and Sunbury. After a partial cloverleaf interchange at Ridge Road, the freeway turns southwest and crosses PA 405 and the West Branch Susquehanna River on a high bridge, crossing from Northumberland into Union County. At the southwest end of the bridge, the open section of the CSVT terminates at an intersection with U.S. 15 several miles south of Winfield, in Union Township, Union County. From here, PA 147 temporarily continues south concurrently with U.S. 15, then meets its new permanent alignment at the Veterans Memorial Bridge and crosses the Susquehanna that bridge to meet its former alignment in Sunbury.

The section currently under construction continues south from the intersection with U.S. 15. This section will carry U.S. 15 and PA 147 concurrently south to a new trumpet interchange, from which a new spur of the highway will extend PA 61 from the Veterans Memorial Bridge to the CSVT. This spur will also carry a concurrency with PA 147. South of this interchange, the freeway will continue carrying U.S. 15 around the western side of Shamokin Dam and Hummels Wharf. The current section of U.S. 11/15 along Susquehanna Trail will continue to carry U.S. 11, but also U.S. 15 Business. The bypass will then meet back up with the existing U.S. 11/15 alignment at the partially completed interchange with U.S. 522, where those highways currently leave the expressway.

When completed, the CSVT will provide the missing link in the four-lane, mostly limited-access route between Harrisburg and Corning, New York (and by extension, Baltimore, Maryland and Rochester, New York) aligned with the Susquehanna River.

== Exit list ==
=== Central Susquehanna Valley Thruway ===
County	Location	mi	km	Destinations	Notes
Snyder	Monroe Township	0.00	0.00	US 11 south / US 15 south – Harrisburg US 11 north / US 15 Bus. north / US 522 south – Selinsgrove, Shamokin Dam	Southern terminus of CSVT; freeway continues south as US 11/US 15
Snyder	Shamokin Dam	4.23	6.81	PA 61 south / PA 147 south to US 11 / US 15 Bus.	PA 61 connector; southern terminus of PA 147 concurrency
Union	Union Township	6.64	10.69	To US 15 Bus. south – Selinsgrove US 15 north – Winfield	Northern end of US 15 concurrency; access to US 15 Bus. via County Line Road
West Branch Susquehanna River		7.25– 8.12	11.67– 13.07	CSVT River Bridge	
Northumberland	West Chillisquaque Township	8.67	13.95	Ridge Road to PA 405 – Northumberland	
Northumberland	West Chillisquaque Township	10.84	17.45	PA 147 north to I-80 / I-180 west – Milton	Northern terminus of CSVT; freeway continues north as PA 147
1.000 mi = 1.609 km; 1.000 km = 0.621 mi: Concurrency terminus; Unopened

=== PA 61 connector ===
The entire route is in Shamokin Dam, Snyder County. All exits are unnumbered.

mi	km	Destinations	Notes
0.00	0.00	US 15 south US 15 north / PA 147 north	Northern terminus of PA 61 connector; Northern terminus of PA 147 concurrency
0.86	1.38	US 11 / US 15 Bus. – Shamokin Dam	Current northern terminus of PA 61
1.000 mi = 1.609 km; 1.000 km = 0.621 mi: Concurrency terminus

== See also ==
- Interstate 83
