= Pennsylvania Route 147 =

State highway in Pennsylvania, United States

Pennsylvania Route 147
- PA 147 highlighted in red, former alignment prior to July 2022 in gray

Route information
- Maintained by PennDOT
- Length: 58.346 mi (93.899 km)
- Existed: 1963–present

Major junctions
- South end: US 22 / US 322 in Reed Township
- PA 225 in Halifax; US 209 in Millersburg; PA 61 in Sunbury; US 11 / US 15 in Shamokin Dam; PA 45 in West Chillisquaque Township; PA 642 near Milton; PA 254 near Milton
- North end: I-80 / I-180 in Turbot Township

Location
- Country: United States
- State: Pennsylvania
- Counties: Dauphin, Northumberland, Snyder, Union

Highway system
- Pennsylvania State Route System; Interstate; US; State; Scenic; Legislative
← PA 146	→ PA 148

Pennsylvania Route 147 (PA 147) is a north–south route that runs for 58.3 miles (93.8 km) along the east shore of the Susquehanna River in central Pennsylvania, United States. The southern terminus is at an interchange with US 22/US 322 in Reed Township. The northern terminus is at an interchange with Interstate 80 (I-80) and I-180 in Turbot Township.

== Route description ==
=== Dauphin County ===
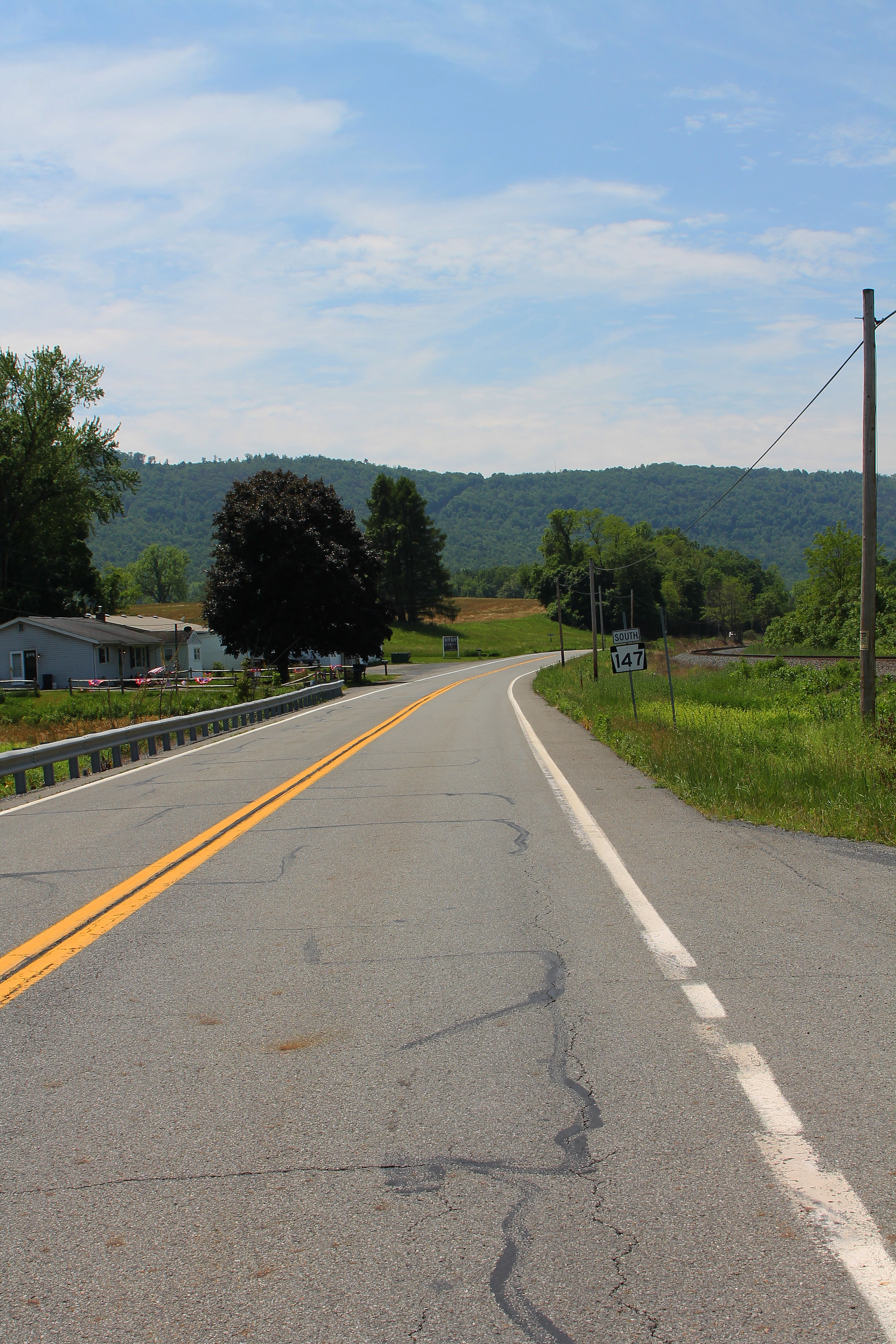
PA 147 south in Upper Paxton Township, near the Dauphin County/Northumberland County line

PA 147 begins an interchange with the US 22/US 322 freeway south of the Clarks Ferry Bridge over the Susquehanna River in Reed Township, Dauphin County. Within this interchange, the highway crosses the Appalachian Trail, which uses Clarks Ferry Bridge across the river. From this interchange, the route heads northeast on two-lane undivided South River Road between the Susquehanna River to the northwest and Norfolk Southern's Buffalo Line and forested Peters Mountain to the southeast. The road passes through the community of Inglenook and heads north away from the mountain, passing over the railroad tracks. PA 147 continues north through wooded areas to the east of the Susquehanna River and the Norfolk Southern line, turning east away from the river and railroad tracks and curving northeast into a mix of farm fields and woodland with some homes. The route crosses into Halifax Township and continues through rural land with some development, curving east and coming to an intersection with PA 225. At this point, PA 147 turns northeast to become concurrent with PA 225 on Peters Mountain Road. The road gains a center left-turn lane and heads north through rural areas of homes and businesses, passing east of Halifax Area High School. The two routes continue into the borough of Halifax and become South 4th Street, losing the center left-turn lane and passing several homes. PA 147 splits from PA 225 by heading west on Market Street through residential areas. The route turns north onto North 2nd Street and leaves Halifax for Halifax Township again, passing more development before becoming North River Road and running through fields to the east of the Susquehanna River and the Buffalo Line. The road bends northwest and continues through a mix of farmland and woods with some homes and commercial development to the east of the river and railroad tracks. PA 147 heads to the west of forested Berry Mountain and enters Upper Paxton Township, curving to the northeast.

The route heads farther east from the Susquehanna River, continuing parallel to the Norfolk Southern tracks and heading between wooded areas to the west and the residential community of Lenkerville to the east, where the railroad tracks head further to the west. The road curves north and crosses the Wiconisco Creek into the borough of Millersburg. Here, PA 147 becomes Market Street and runs past homes before coming to a square in the center of town, where it becomes a divided highway and intersects the southern terminus of US 209, which is split into a one-way pair. From here, the route becomes undivided and runs through the commercial downtown of Millersburg before continuing into residential areas with a few businesses. The road leaves Millersburg for Upper Paxton Township again and becomes unnamed, heading through a mix of fields and woods with some development a short distance to the east of the Buffalo Line. PA 147 curves northwest and continues through rural areas, with the road and railroad tracks drawing closer to the Susquehanna River. The route heads to the southwest of forested Mahantango Mountain and makes a sharp bend to the northeast along with the river and railroad line, heading along the northwest side of the mountain. The road curves north away from Mahantango Mountain and passes through the community of Paxton, continuing through a mix of farmland and woodland immediately to the east of the Norfolk Southern tracks, with the Susquehanna River further to the west.

=== Northumberland, Snyder, and Union counties ===
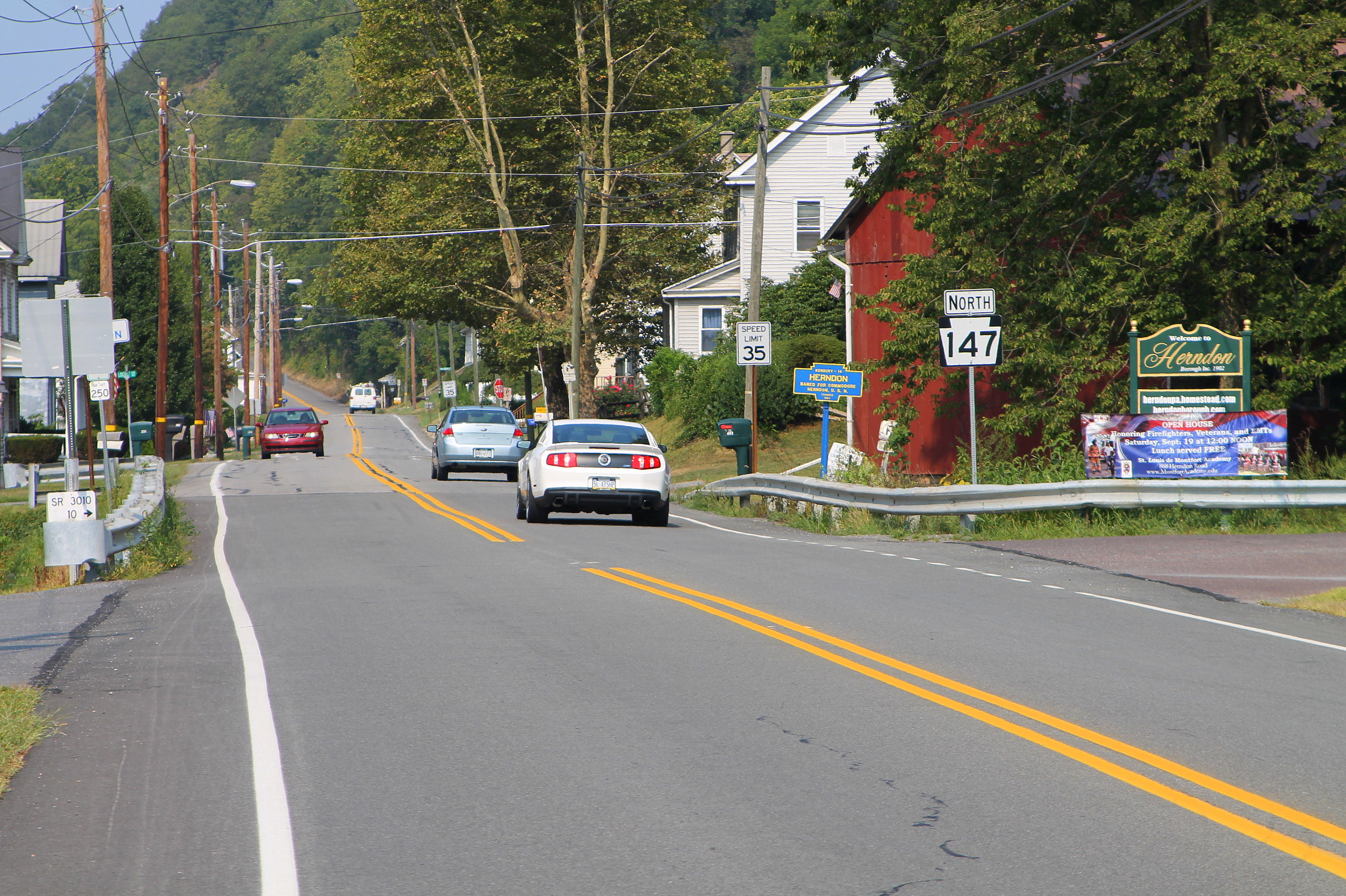
PA 147 northbound entering Herndon

PA 147 crosses the Mahantango Creek into Lower Mahanoy Township in Northumberland County and continues through a mix of farm fields and woods with some residences, curving northeast and running further from the Susquehanna River and the Buffalo Line. The route bends to the north and runs through a patch of forest before heading northeast through the residential community of Dalmatia as George Street. The road becomes unnamed again and runs between the river and railroad tracks to the northwest and forested Hooflander Mountain to the northeast. PA 147 heads east-northeast further away from the Susquehanna River and the Norfolk Southern line and runs through forests with some fields to the north of the mountain. The route comes to an intersection with a connector road to PA 225 a short distance to the east, where it makes a sharp turn to the northwest and runs through more woodland, crossing Fidlers Run into Jackson Township. The road curves to the northeast, with the Susquehanna River and Buffalo Line a short distance to the west, and enters the borough of Herndon, where it becomes South Main Street and passes residences. PA 147 continues through more wooded areas of the borough before heading past more homes with a few businesses, passing through the center of Herndon and becoming North Main Street. The route leaves Herndon for Jackson Township, becoming unnamed, and runs north through woodland with some development, crossing Mahanoy Creek. The road runs to the east of the Susquehanna River and the Norfolk Southern tracks and passes farm fields before running to the west of forested Little Mountain and entering Lower Augusta Township. PA 147 continues north-northwest through wooded areas with some fields and development and passes through the community of Fishers Ferry. The route heads north through rural areas further east from the river and railroad tracks before coming to the community of Selinsgrove Junction and closely following them again. The road enters Upper Augusta Township and curves northeast further from the Susquehanna River and the Norfolk Southern line, heading through farmland with some residences. PA 147 turns to the northwest before it makes a bend to the northeast and closely follows the river and railroad tracks through forested areas.

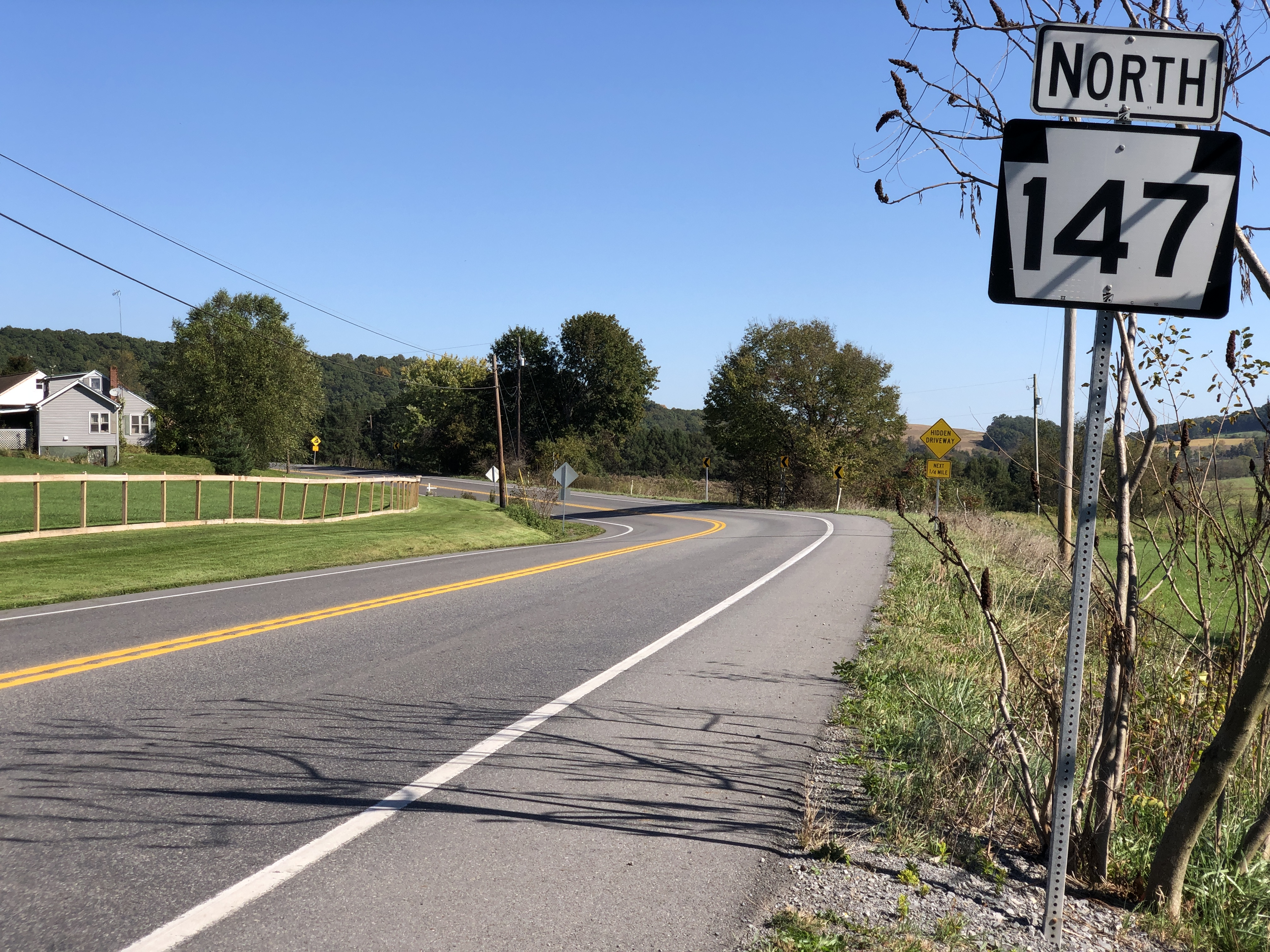
PA 147 northbound in Upper Augusta Township

The route curves north and comes to a bridge over the Buffalo Line and Shamokin Creek, at which point it enters the city of Sunbury and becomes South Front Street. PA 147 passes west of the Weis Markets corporate headquarters and splits into a one-way pair following South Front Street southbound and South 2nd Street northbound, both two-way, two-lane roads. The route comes to an interchange with PA 61. At this point, PA 147 heads west for a concurrency with PA 61 along a four-lane undivided road that crosses the Susquehanna River on the Veterans Memorial Bridge, leaving Sunbury and running through Upper Augusta Township while crossing the river.

Upon crossing the river, the road enters the borough of Shamokin Dam in Snyder County and reaches a trumpet interchange with US 11/US 15, where PA 61 ends and PA 147 heads north for a concurrency with US 11/US 15. The three routes continue northeast on four-lane divided Susquehanna Trail, with US 11 splitting from US 15/PA 147 by turning to the northeast. US 15/PA 147 head northwest along the border between Shamokin Dam to the west and Monroe Township to the east, becoming undivided and running through wooded areas with some development. The road fully enters Monroe Township and turns west, becoming unnamed and transitioning into a divided highway with a wide median as it runs through woodland with some fields and development. The two routes curve to the north and the median narrows before it crosses into Union Township in Union County and comes to an interchange with the current southern terminus of the Central Susquehanna Valley Thruway. At this point, PA 147 splits from US 15 by heading north-northeast on the Central Susquehanna Valley Thruway, a four-lane freeway.

The freeway crosses the West Branch Susquehanna River into Point Township in Northumberland County and passes over the Buffalo Line and PA 405 before coming to an interchange with Ridge Road that provides access to PA 405. Following this interchange, PA 147 curves to the northwest through a mix of fields and woods and runs a short distance to the east of PA 405, entering West Chillisquaque Township and coming to a bridge over Chillisquaque Creek. The route curves north-northeast into farmland and comes to the northern terminus of the Central Susquehanna Valley Thruway as it continues along a freeway, reaching a diamond interchange with PA 45 to the east of the community of Montandon. PA 147 heads north through more agricultural areas before running through woods and coming to an interchange serving Industrial Park Road. The freeway runs north-northeast through a mix of fields and woods to the east of the borough of Milton and comes to a diamond interchange serving PA 642, at which point it crosses into Turbot Township. Following this interchange, the route passes north-northwest through rural areas to the east of residential development and reaches the PA 254 exit. Past here, the freeway continues through agricultural areas with some woods. PA 147 bends to the north-northeast and comes to its northern terminus at a cloverleaf interchange with I-80, at which point the freeway becomes I-180.

== History ==
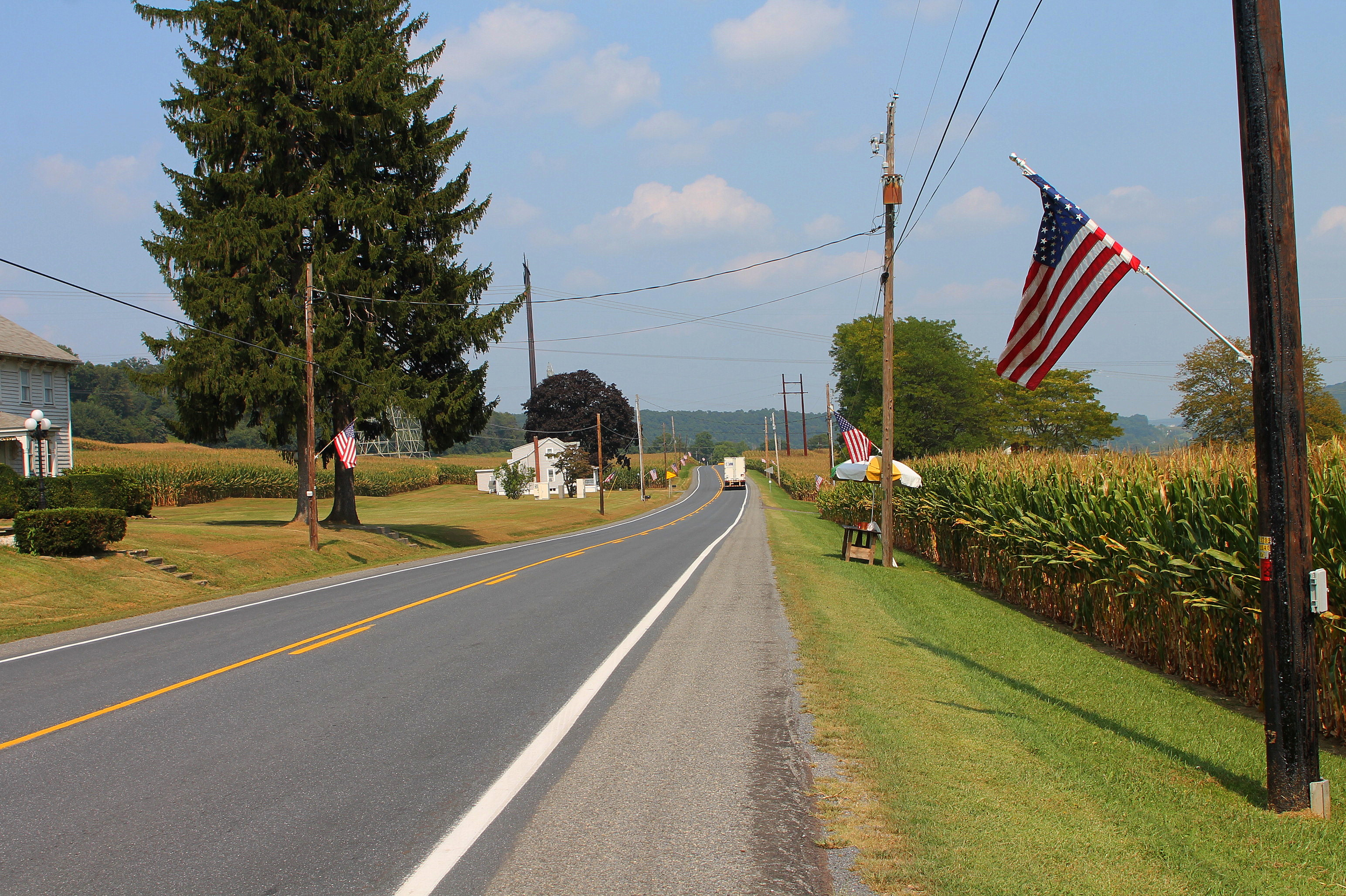
PA 147 north in Upper Augusta Township, Northumberland County

From 1926 to 1928, PA 147 from Northumberland to Chillisquaque was signed as U.S. Route 111 and U.S. Route 711. In 1928, the US 711 designation was removed from the road. Eight years later, US 111 was removed from the alignment. PA 147 was designated in 1963 to replace the section of PA 14 between Clarks Ferry and Halls. The northern terminus of PA 147 was moved to its current location in January 1984, with I-180 replacing the PA 147 designation between I-80 near Milton and US 220 in Pennsdale.

As part of the construction of the Central Susquehanna Valley Thruway, PA 147 will join PA 61 in a new road starting at their current southern junction in Sunbury, continuing west across the river as far as the new path for US 15. PA 147 will then join US 15 northward for this new route until US 15 converges with its business spur near Lewisburg, at which point PA 147 will cross the west branch of the river and resume its current route at a junction with PA 405. PA 405 will replace PA 147 between this junction and the junction with PA 61. The northbound lanes of the northern section of the Central Susquehanna Valley Thruway opened to traffic on July 7, 2022, with the southbound lanes opening the following day. Construction of the entire northern section will be finished by the end of 2022. With the opening of the northern section, PA 147 was rerouted to follow the Central Susquehanna Valley Thruway south from PA 405 to US 15, where it continues south concurrent with US 15 and PA 61 to rejoin its original alignment in Sunbury, while PA 405 was extended south along the former alignment of PA 147 to PA 61 in Sunbury.

== Major intersections ==
County	Location	mi	km	Destinations	Notes
Dauphin	Reed Township	0.000	0.000	US 22 / US 322	Interchange at Clarks Ferry Bridge; southern terminus
Dauphin	Halifax Township	6.234	10.033	PA 225 south (Peters Mountain Road) – Dauphin	Southern end of PA 225 concurrency
Dauphin	Halifax	7.658	12.324	PA 225 north (4th Street) – Elizabethville	Northern end of PA 225 concurrency
Dauphin	Millersburg	13.777– 13.808	22.172– 22.222	US 209 north (Union Street) to PA 25 east – Elizabethville	Southern terminus of US 209
Northumberland	Lower Mahanoy Township	28.425	45.746	SR 3012 to PA 225 – Shamokin	
Northumberland	Sunbury	42.238	67.975	PA 61 south – Sunbury	Southern end of PA 61 concurrency; interchange
Susquehanna River				Veterans Memorial Bridge	
Snyder	Shamokin Dam			US 11 south / US 15 south – Selinsgrove, Harrisburg PA 61 ends	Southern end of US 11/US 15 concurrency; northern terminus of PA 61
Snyder	Shamokin Dam			US 11 north – Northumberland, Danville	Northern end of US 11 concurrency
Union	Union Township			Southern end of freeway section	
Union	Union Township			US 15 north – Winfield, Lewisburg	Northern end of US 15 concurrency; signed for Winfield southbound; Lewisburg northbound
West Branch Susquehanna River				CSVT River Bridge	
Northumberland	Point Township			Ridge Road to PA 405 – Northumberland	
Northumberland	West Chillisquaque Township	52.281	84.138	PA 45 – Montandon, Lewisburg	
Northumberland	West Chillisquaque Township	53.637	86.320	Industrial Park Road	
Northumberland	Turbot Township	55.389	89.140	PA 642 (Mahoning Street)	
Northumberland	Turbot Township	56.299	90.604	PA 254 (Broadway)	
Northumberland	Turbot Township	58.346	93.899	I-80 – Bloomsburg, Bellefonte	Exit 212A on I-80
Northumberland	Turbot Township	58.346	93.899	I-180 west – Williamsport	Continuation west
1.000 mi = 1.609 km; 1.000 km = 0.621 mi: Concurrency terminus
