= Pennsylvania Route 405 =

State highway in Pennsylvania, US

Pennsylvania Route 405
- Major highways in the Williamsport area with PA 405 in red

Route information
- Maintained by PennDOT
- Length: 35.124 mi (56.527 km)
- Existed: 1941–present

Major junctions
- South end: PA 61 in Sunbury
- US 11 in Northumberland; PA 45 in West Chillisquaque Township; PA 642 in Milton; PA 254 in Milton; PA 44 in Watsontown; PA 54 in Montgomery; I-180 in Muncy; PA 442 in Muncy Creek Township; PA 118 in Hughesville
- North end: US 220 in Hughesville

Location
- Country: United States
- State: Pennsylvania
- Counties: Northumberland, Lycoming

Highway system
- Pennsylvania State Route System; Interstate; US; State; Scenic; Legislative
← PA 404	→ PA 407

Pennsylvania Route 405 (PA 405) is a 35.124-mile-long (56.527 km) state highway that runs in the north-central part of the U.S. state of Pennsylvania. The southern terminus is an intersection with PA 61 in Sunbury. The route heads across the Susquehanna River to Northumberland and northward along the West Branch Susquehanna River through Milton, Watsontown and Muncy until entering Hughesville, where it terminates at an intersection with U.S. Route 220 (US 220).

PA 405 originated as the Muncy and Hughesville Plank Road, a 5-mile (8.0 km) plank road from Muncy to Hughesville, created in 1853. The plank road also consisted of a bridge over the Muncy Canal on the outskirts of the community. PA 405 was assigned in 1941, after switching between numerous designations, including alignments of US 15, US 111, US 220, and US 711. The alignment of PA 405 was extended south to PA 147 in Chillisquaque when PA 147 was realigned onto a new highway. As part of the Central Susquehanna Valley Thruway project, PA 405 was extended further south, replacing the stretch of PA 147 until its junction with PA 61 in Sunbury, its new southern terminus. PA 147 was moved to a new alignment between those two junctions.

== Route description ==
=== Sunbury to Watsontown ===
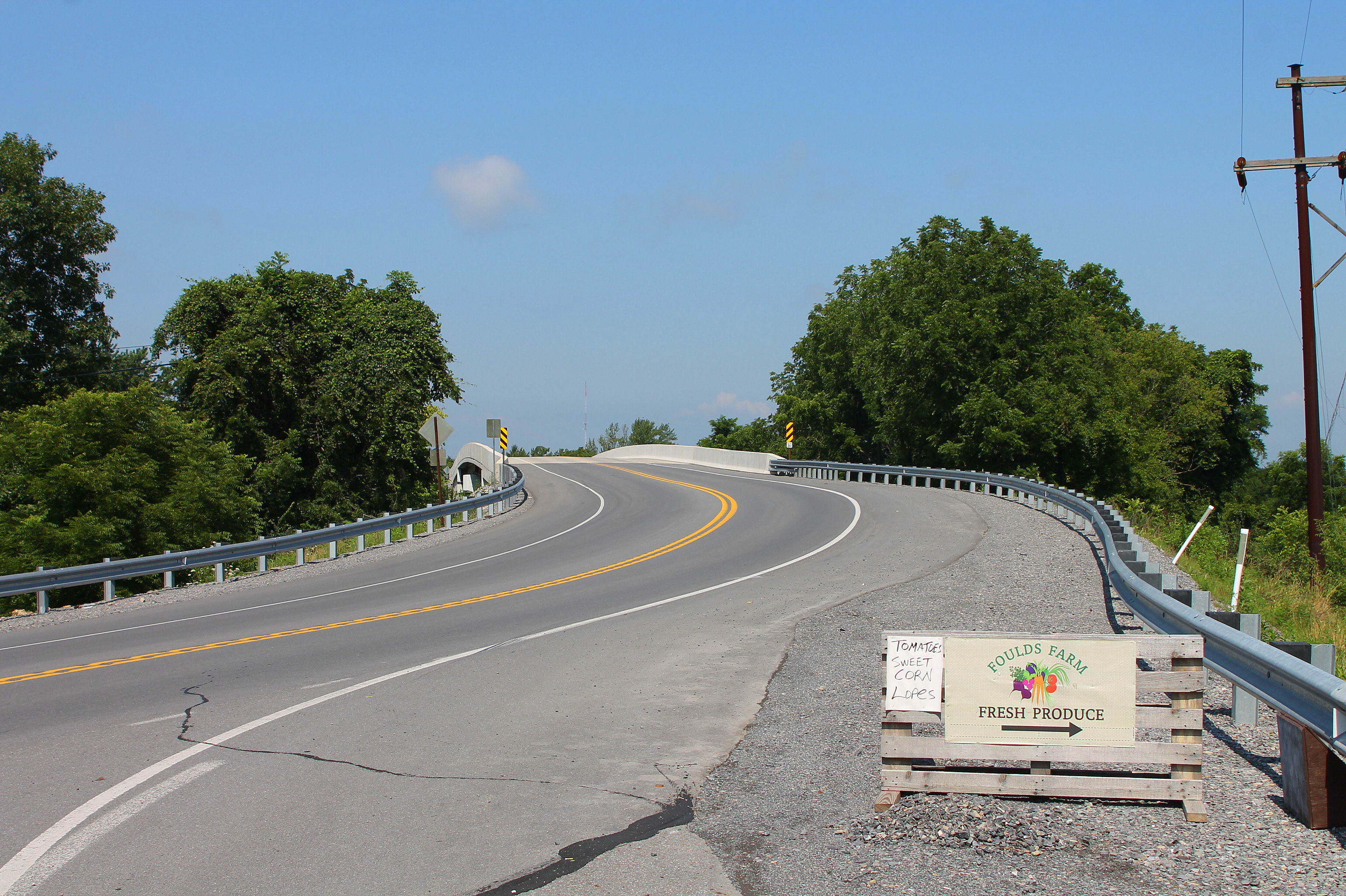
PA 405 north in West Chillisquaque Township, Northumberland County

PA 405 begins at an intersection with PA 61 in the city of Sunbury in Northumberland County, heading north on two-lane undivided North Front Street. From the southern terminus, the road heads between the Susquehanna River to the west and homes and businesses to the east, coming to the end of northbound PA 61 Truck at Arch Street. The route continues north along the east bank of the river through residential areas, passing the site of Fort Augusta. The road and the river curve northeast, with the road leaving Sunbury for Upper Augusta Township and passing under a bridge that carries Norfolk Southern's Buffalo Line over the Susquehanna River. A short distance later, PA 405 turns north and comes to a bridge over the Susquehanna River, heading onto Packer Island. Here, the route becomes a three-lane road with a center left-turn lane called Bridge Avenue and runs past homes and industrial areas to the east of Shikellamy State Park. The road narrows to two lanes and curves northwest, heading off the island and over the Susquehanna River into the borough of Northumberland. PA 405 becomes King Street and crosses the North Shore Railroad, running past homes and businesses and to an intersection with US 11. At this point, the route turns southwest for a concurrency with US 11 on Water Street, passing more development. PA 405 splits from US 11 by turning northwest onto Duke Street, heading through residential and commercial areas.

The route leaves Northumberland for Point Township and splits from Duke Street, following Susquehanna Trail and running between wooded areas near the Buffalo Line to the southwest and the residential community of Kapp Heights to the northeast. The road continues between farmland with some trees and homes to the northeast and forests to the southwest, with the Norfolk Southern tracks a short distance from the road and the West Branch Susquehanna River further southwest. Along this stretch, the route passes under the PA 147 freeway (Central Susquehanna Valley Thruway), with Ridge Road heading east to provide access to PA 147 at an interchange. PA 405 continues through fields and woods with some development and curves to the north-northwest, passing to the west of Montour Ridge. The route crosses into West Chillisquaque Township further north.

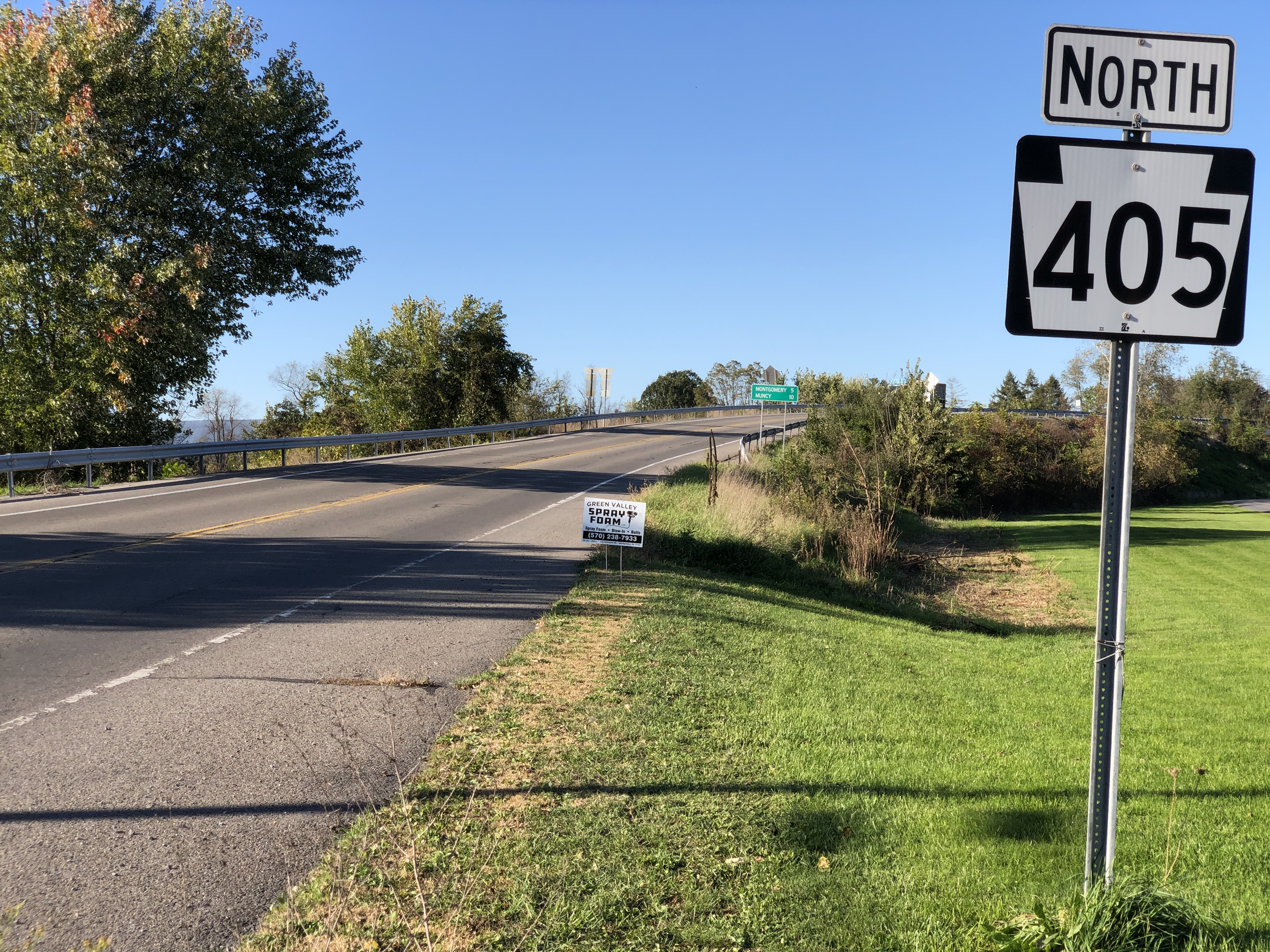
PA 405 northbound past PA 44 in Delaware Township

The route heads to the northwest, heading through the community of Chillisquaque and running along a parallel to PA 147 near rural farms and houses. The route reaches the center of Chillisquaque, where it turns westward for a distance through an isolated area along the West Branch Susquehanna River. The route meets the shoreline, where PA 405 turns to the northwest along a rural, unpopulated stretch of West Chillisquaque Township. The route heads northward, crossing through a deep patch of forests. A short distance later, the forests dissipate, and PA 405 intersects with PA 45 (the Purple Heart Highway) just across the river from the borough of Lewisburg. PA 405 continues northward along the Susquehanna River, intersecting with a former alignment of PA 45 a short distance later. The route continues through the rural farmland along the river, entering the small community of East Lewisburg. North of East Lewisburg, PA 405 passes a large farmland plot before leaving the shoreline of the Susquehanna West Branch. The route continues northward a short distance from the Susquehanna River before entering the borough of Milton.

In Milton, PA 405 crosses over a set of railroad tracks and turns onto Ferry Lane. The route heads eastward until turning northward onto Garfield Street, heading past homes and businesses and intersecting with PA 642 (Mahoning Street). The route continues northward onto South Arch Street, intersecting with Center Street, where it turns northward. At the end of the block, PA 405 intersects with PA 254 (Broadway). The highway continues northward, intersecting with local streets and paralleling railroad tracks. At the intersection with 10th Street, PA 405 turns to the northwest and leaves the community of Milton. The route returns to the shoreline of the West Branch of the Susquehanna River, continuing northward along the Turbot Hills Golf Course. The route continues northward, intersecting with Golf Course Road, where the route becomes surrounded by forests. A short distance later, PA 405 crosses under the four lane alignment of Interstate 80 (I-80) and intersects an old alignment of the Susquehanna Trail. The route continues northward along the West Branch of the Susquehanna River, passing a large industrial complex before reaching a merge in the railroad tracks. At the merge, PA 405 enters the borough of Watsontown.

=== Watsontown to Hughesville ===
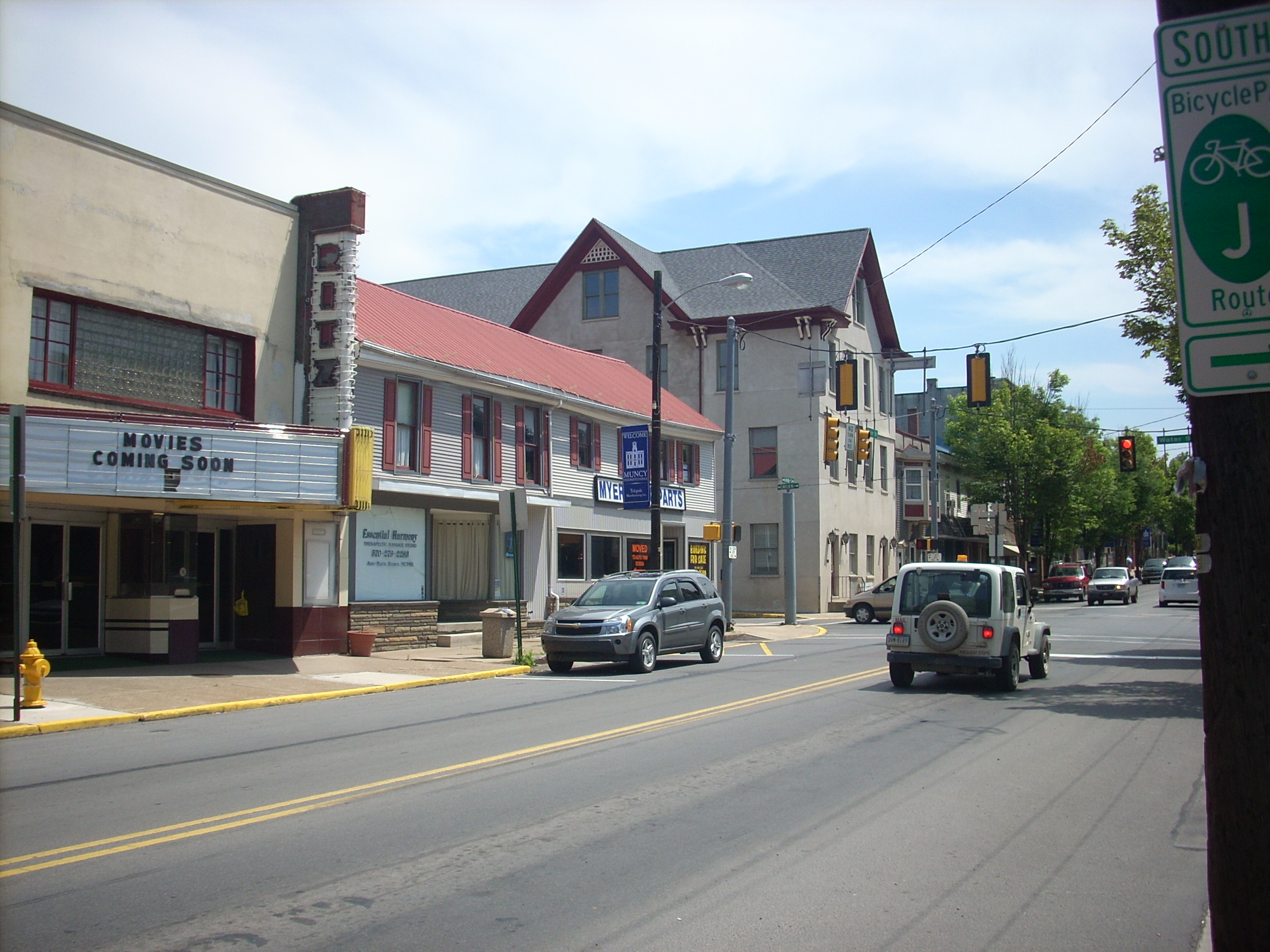
PA 405 heading through the community of Muncy

After entering Watsontown, PA 405 passes the local memorial park and intersects with PA 44 (South Main Street). PA 405 and PA 44 become concurrent along Main Street into downtown Watsontown. The two highways continue several blocks from the Susquehanna River, intersecting with Brimmer Avenue. The surroundings of the highways are highly populated, and the two routes continue in Watsontown until an intersection with East 11th Street, when the two roads leave the community. PA 405 and PA 44 continue northward, intersecting with local roads in a rural region north of Watsontown. The highways continue, entering the community of Dewart, where PA 44 turns to the west towards the Susquehanna West Branch. PA 405 continues northward, bypassing around Dewart and crossing the railroad tracks it had been paralleling for the distance. The route continues northward, leaving Dewart at an intersection with Delaware Drive. The route heads northward, crossing through the rural areas before intersecting with PA 54, where they merge. PA 405 and PA 54 continue through a deep patch of forests before crossing the river, entering the borough of Montgomery.

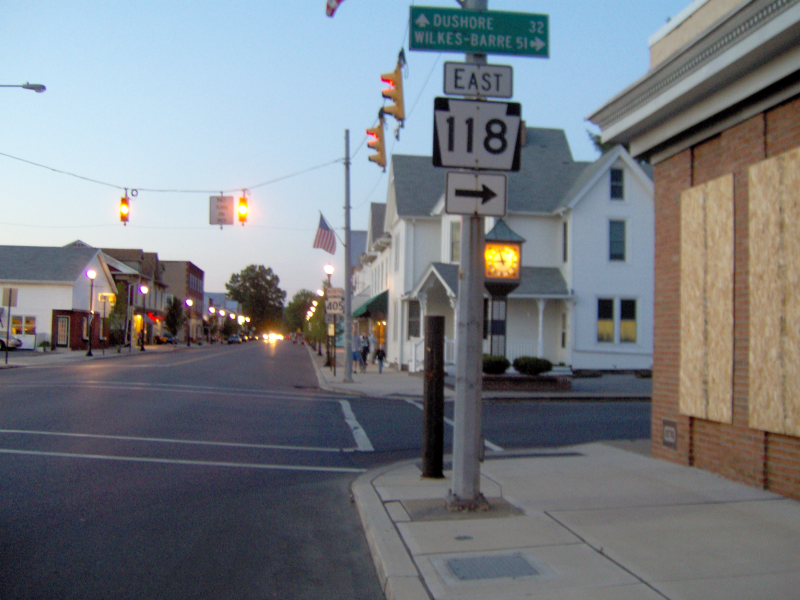
PA 405 at the intersection with the western terminus of PA 118 in Hughesville

In Montgomery, PA 405 and PA 54 continue for a short distance along Second Street, until Montgomery Street, where PA 405 turns to the northeast, while PA 54 turns to the northwest. PA 405 continues along Montgomery Street, passing through downtown. At an intersection with School House Road, the highway leaves Montgomery. PA 405 continues to the northeast along a set of railroad tracks and at an intersection with Saegers Station Road, enters the community of Saegers. At a merge with Private 158 Road, PA 405 turns to the north, passing the small community to the north. At an intersection with Armstrong Road, the highway turns to the northeast, leaving Saegers. The route continues to the east, crossing over the West Branch once again, entering the borough of Muncy. In Muncy, the highway heads to the southeast along Water Street into the community center, where it turns to the northeast. The route leaves Muncy a short distance later, interchanging with I-180 Exit 13. PA 405 passes south of a park and ride lot and heads to the northeast until reaching Muncy Creek, where it turns to the southeast, intersecting with the western terminus of PA 442. PA 405 continues farther, intersecting with local roads, running along South Main Street for a distance, entering the borough of Hughesville, where the highway becomes densely populated. The route heads northward, intersecting with the western terminus of PA 118. The route continues northward for a short distance, with the PA 405 designation terminating at an intersection with US 220.

== History ==
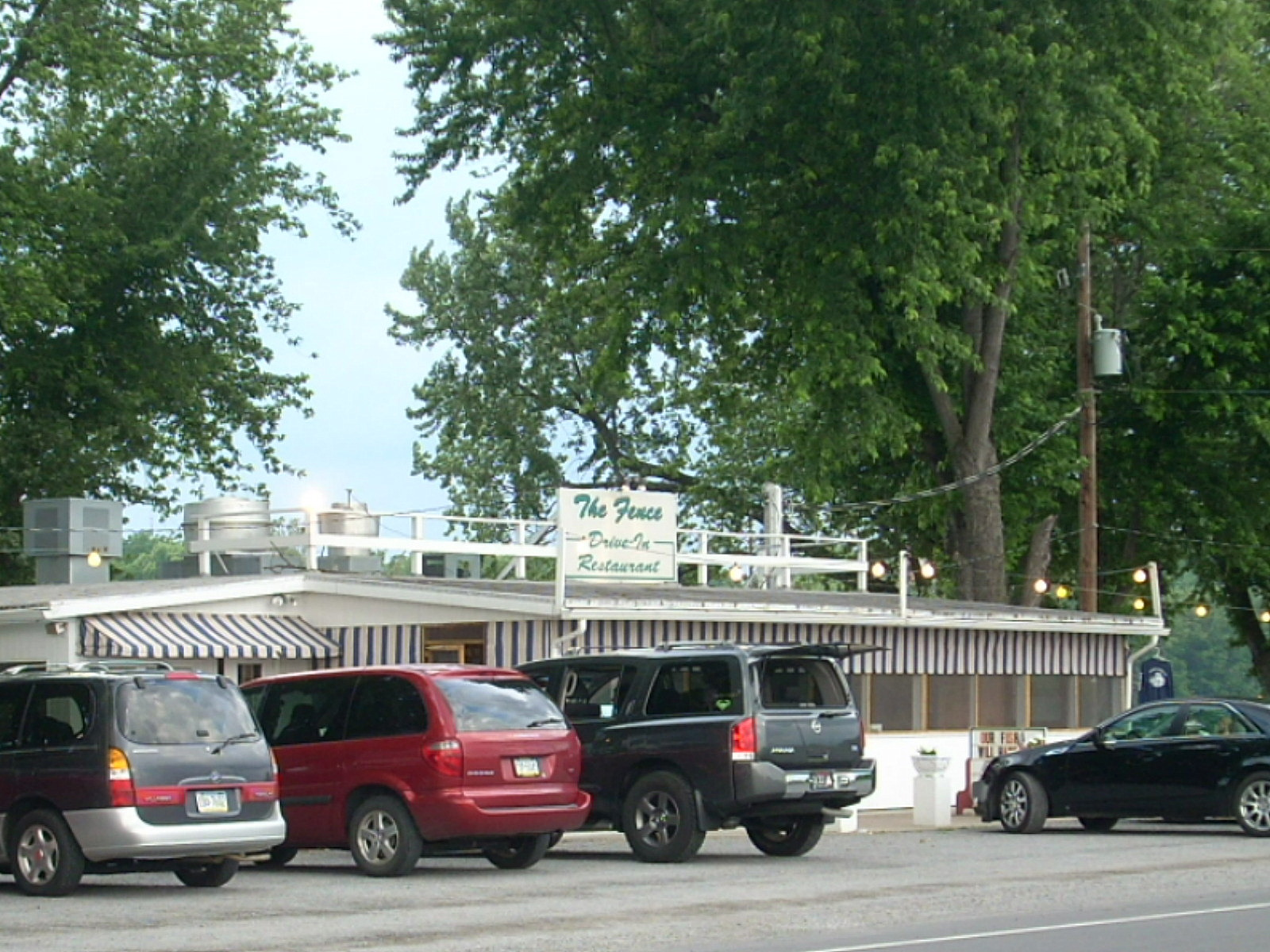
The Fence Drive-In, a landmark along PA 405

=== Old roads ===
The short alignment of PA 405 from Muncy to Hughesville contains most of the highway's history. The bridge over the West Branch of the Susquehanna River was originally privately maintained, with the charter for its construction coming down from the Pennsylvania State Legislature on March 13, 1835. The charter designated the company that owned the bridge as the Susquehanna Bridge Company at Walton's Landing (now Muncy) and the state appointed eleven commissioners to help erect the toll bridge. In 1853, a portion of land from the Susquehanna River West Branch (which was a canal at the time) was chartered to become a canal. The canal was constructed in 1848 by a privately maintained company for $3,000 (1848 USD). The bridge over the canal that currently uses PA 405 was constructed in 1854 at a cost of $27,000 (1854 USD), nine times the amount to construct the canal. The portion of PA 405 from Muncy to Hughesville was also chartered in 1853, consisting of a plank road between the two towns.

=== Designation ===
US 711 was signed on a small piece of PA 405 from 1926 to 1928.

On May 31, 1911, the state of Pennsylvania signed the Sproul Road Bill, which started a drastic state takeover of highways. Originally, only several routes were assigned around the state. The stretch of PA 405 from the southern terminus to the current day intersection with PA 44 was designated as Legislative Route 18. The portion of PA 405 along the PA 44 concurrency to Delwart was designated as Legislative Route 240 (most of this alignment is PA 44). The stretch from Delwart to Montgomery was not designated in 1911. From Montgomery to Muncy, PA 405 follows more of Legislative Route 240. After Muncy, PA 405 follows Legislative Route 19 until the current terminus in Hughesville.

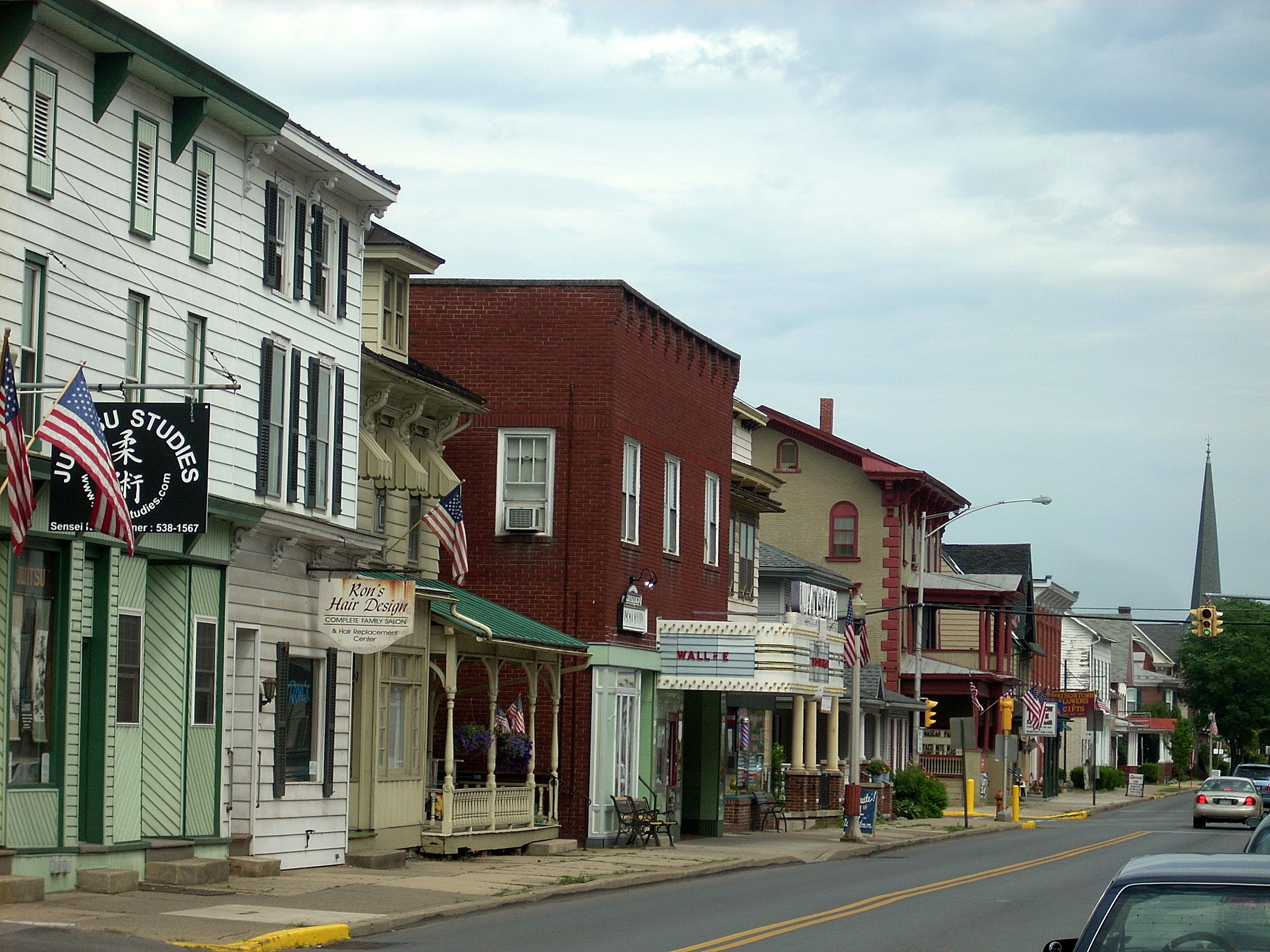
The stretch of PA 44 and PA 405 through Watsontown

When the switch was made in 1924 from the old highway system in Pennsylvania, the alignment of PA 405 was designated as PA 4 from the community of Chillisquaque to the intersection with the Susquehanna Trail. PA 4 was designated in 1925 along the main alignment of the Susquehanna Trail. The route designation remained in place for a short time. The stretch from Muncy to Hughesville (which followed the alignment of the Penn's Plank Road), was designated in 1926 as an alignment of US 220. The portion of PA 4 from Chillisquaque to the Susquehanna trail was also designated as US 111 and US 711, both decommissioned spurs of US 11 in 1926. US 111 remained in place until 1936, while US 711 and PA 4 were decommissioned in 1928 and 1930 respectively. In 1928, the segment of PA 4 from Watsontown to Muncy was re-designated as PA 14. In 1936, US 111 was decommissioned, and the route from Chillisquaque to Watsontown was redesignated as part of US 15. PA 14, US 220 and US 15 remained on most of PA 405's alignment until 1941, when the alignment of all three routes were changed. Upon the decommissioning, PA 405 was designated onto the alignment from PA 14 (Susquehanna Trail) north of Milton north to Hughesville. The alignment of PA 405 south of the Susquehanna Trail was part of PA 14, which became PA 147 in 1963. In 1972, PA 147 was realigned, and PA 405 was extended south to PA 147 in Chillisquaque. In July 2022, PA 405 was extended further south along the former alignment of PA 147 to PA 61 in Sunbury following the opening of the northern section of the Central Susquehanna Valley Thruway, which PA 147 was rerouted onto.

== Major intersections ==
County	Location	mi	km	Destinations	Notes
Northumberland	Sunbury	0.000	0.000	PA 61 (Market Street/South Front Street) – Selinsgrove, Millersburg, Shamokin	Southern terminus
Northumberland	Sunbury	0.105	0.169	PA 61 Truck north (Arch Street)	Northern terminus of PA 61 Truck northbound
Northumberland	Northumberland	2.152	3.463	US 11 north (Water Street) – Bloomsburg	Southern terminus of concurrency
Northumberland	Northumberland	2.313	3.722	US 11 south (Water Street) – Selinsgrove	Northern terminus of concurrency
Northumberland	West Chillisquaque Township	9.907	15.944	PA 45 (Purple Heart Highway) – Lewisburg, Montandon	
Northumberland	Milton	13.589	21.869	PA 642 (Mahoning Street) to US 15 – West Milton, Pottsgrove	
Northumberland	Milton	13.937	22.429	PA 254 east (Broadway Street)	Western terminus of PA 254
Northumberland	Watsontown	18.159	29.224	PA 44 south (Main Street)	Southern terminus of concurrency
Northumberland	Delaware Township	20.438	32.892	PA 44 north (Bridge Street) – Allenwood	Northern terminus of concurrency
Northumberland	Delaware Township	23.894	38.454	PA 54 east – Turbotville	Southern terminus of concurrency
Lycoming	Montgomery	24.981	40.203	PA 54 west (Montgomery Street) to US 15 – Williamsport	Northern terminus of concurrency
Lycoming	Muncy	31.248– 31.267	50.289– 50.319	I-180 – Williamsport, Milton	Exit 13 (I-180)
Lycoming	Muncy Creek Township	31.952	51.422	PA 442 east – Bloomsburg	Western terminus of PA 442
Lycoming	Hughesville	34.772	55.960	PA 118 east (Water Street) – Wilkes-Barre	Western terminus of PA 118
Lycoming	Hughesville	35.124	56.527	US 220	Northern terminus
1.000 mi = 1.609 km; 1.000 km = 0.621 mi: Concurrency terminus

== See also ==
- West Branch of the Susquehanna River
