= U.S. Route 15 in Pennsylvania =

Highway in Pennsylvania

U.S. Route 15
- US 15 highlighted in red and business loops in blue

Route information
- Maintained by PennDOT
- Length: 194.89 mi (313.65 km)
- Tourist routes: Journey Through Hallowed Ground Byway

Major junctions
- South end: US 15 at the Maryland state line in Emmitsburg, MD
- US 30 near Gettysburg; I-76 Toll / Penna Turnpike near Mechanicsburg; US 11 / PA 581 in Camp Hill; I-81 near Enola; US 22 / US 322 near Duncannon; US 522 near Selinsgrove; US 11 in Shamokin Dam; I-80 near Lewisburg; I-99 / US 220 in Williamsport; US 6 in Mansfield
- North end: I-99 / US 15 at the New York state line in Lawrenceville

Location
- Country: United States
- State: Pennsylvania
- Counties: Adams, York, Cumberland, Perry, Dauphin, Juniata, Snyder, Union, Lycoming, Tioga

Highway system
- United States Numbered Highway System; List; Special; Divided; Pennsylvania State Route System; Interstate; US; State; Scenic; Legislative
← PA 14	→ PA 15
← PA 403	PA 404	→ PA 405

U.S. Route 15 (US 15) is United States Numbered Highway that runs from Walterboro, South Carolina, north to Painted Post, New York. In Pennsylvania, the highway runs for 194.89 miles (313.65 km), from the Maryland state line just south of Gettysburg, north to the New York state line near Lawrenceville.

== Route description ==
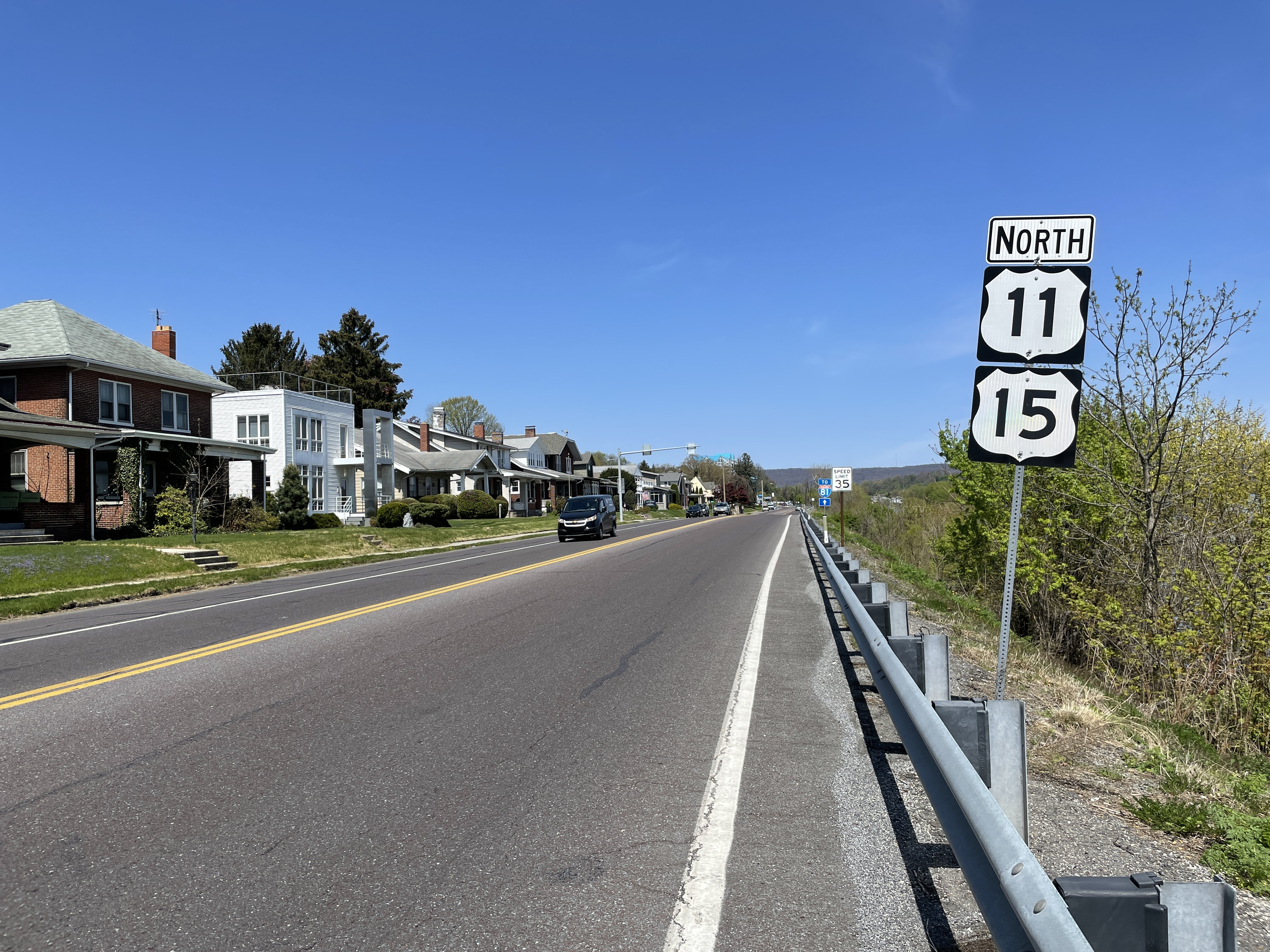
US 11/US 15 northbound in Wormleysburg

US 15 enters Pennsylvania south of Gettysburg, Adams County, from Frederick County, Maryland, on a freeway alignment. The route heads to the north and bypasses Gettysburg, where the route has an interchange with US 30. The freeway alignment ends at York Springs, carrying US 15 on a four-lane expressway, then becoming a four-lane arterial road in Dillsburg, until the route upgrades to a freeway again. The route continues north toward Harrisburg, where the freeway terminates again as US 15 joins with US 11. The two routes begin to follow the west shore of the Susquehanna River with limited-access sections until they split across the river from Sunbury. US 15 continues north into Williamsport, joining Interstate 180 (I-180) and US 220. At I-180's western terminus, US 220, signed south, heads due west toward Jersey Shore and Lock Haven, while US 15 turns due north with Interstate 99 through Mansfield and crosses into New York near Lawrenceville, Tioga County.

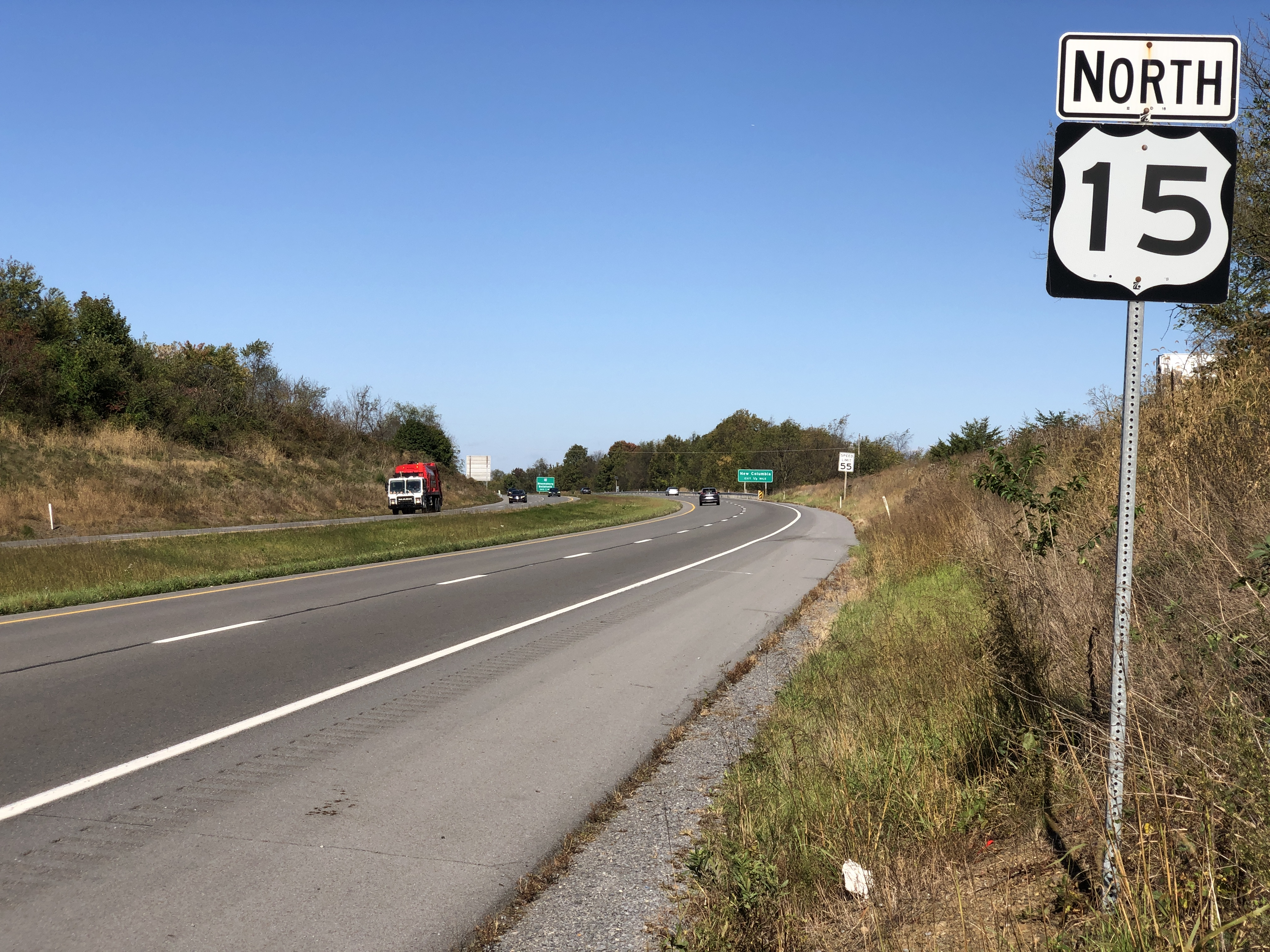
US 15 northbound past PA 642 in White Deer Township, Union County

The majority of US 15 is four lanes, alternating between limited and unlimited access. There are two segments where the road is two lanes. One is from East Pennsboro Township, Cumberland County, just north of the I-81 interchange, to just south of Duncannon. The other is between White Deer and South Williamsport. The segment between Williamsport and the New York state line was co-designated as I-99 in July 2026.

== History ==
Pennsylvania Route 404
- Location: Shamokin Dam–Williamsport
- Existed: 1928–1941

With the adoption of the U.S. Numbered Highway System, US 15 originally terminated at Harrisburg, while US 111 serviced the modern route north of that point. In 1937, US 15 was extended north to the New York state line, effectively replacing US 111 north of Harrisburg. However, instead of replacing US 111's old routing directly, US 15 ran along the east bank of the Susquehanna River between Harrisburg and Williamsport. Meanwhile, the road on the western bank of the river was Pennsylvania Route 14 (PA 14) between Lemoyne and Duncannon, US 11 between Duncannon and Shamokin Dam, and PA 404 between Shamokin Dam and Williamsport. In 1941, US 15 was rerouted to follow the western bank of the river between Harrisburg and Williamsport, replacing PA 14 between Lemoyne and Duncannon, running concurrent with US 11 between Lemoyne and Shamokin Dam, and replacing the entire length of PA 404. The former alignment of US 15 on the east side of the river became PA 14.

== Future ==
As part of the construction of the Central Susquehanna Valley Thruway, US 15 is planned to be rerouted to the new freeway between Selinsgrove and Union Township, bypassing Shamokin Dam. The former alignment of US 15 through Shamokin Dam will be designated as US 15 Business, partly running concurrent with US 11.

== Major intersections ==
County	Location	mi	km	Exit	Destinations	Notes
Adams	Freedom Township	0.0	0.0		US 15 south (Catoctin Mountain Highway) – Frederick	Continuation into Maryland
Adams	Freedom Township	1.74	2.80		US 15 Bus. (Steinwehr Avenue)	
Adams	Cumberland Township	5.88	9.46		PA 134 (Taneytown Road)	
Adams	Mount Joy Township	8.15	13.12		PA 97 south (Baltimore Street)	Northern terminus of PA 97; access to Gettysburg National Military Park
Adams	Straban Township	10.01	16.11		PA 116 (Hanover Road)	
Adams	Straban Township	11.52	18.54		US 30 (York Street)	Access to Gettysburg College
Adams	Straban Township	14.71	23.67		US 15 Bus. south / PA 394 – Hunterstown	Northern terminus of US 15 Bus.; access to Gettysburg College
Adams	Tyrone Township	19.59	31.53		PA 234 – Heidlersburg, East Berlin	
Adams	Huntington Township	23.59	37.96		PA 94 – Hanover, York Springs	Hanover not signed northbound
York	Dillsburg–Carroll Township line			Northern end of limited-access section		
York	Dillsburg–Carroll Township line	32.51	52.32		PA 74 south (North Baltimore Street) to PA 194 – Dillsburg, York	Southern end of PA 74 concurrency
York	Dillsburg–Carroll Township line	32.72	52.66		PA 74 north (York Road) – Williams Grove, Carlisle	Northern end of PA 74 concurrency
Cumberland	Upper Allen Township			Southern end of freeway section		
Cumberland	Upper Allen Township	36.32	58.45		Lisburn Road	
Cumberland	Upper Allen Township	37.68	60.64		PA 114 – Mechanicsburg, Bowmansdale	
Cumberland	Upper Allen Township	38.72	62.31		Winding Hill Road / Cumberland Parkway	
Cumberland	Upper Allen Township	39.29	63.23		I-76 Toll / Penna Turnpike – Pittsburgh, Philadelphia	Exit 236 (Gettysburg Pike) on I-76 / Penna Turnpike
Cumberland	Lower Allen Township	40.31	64.87		Wesley Drive / Rossmoyne Road	
Cumberland	Lower Allen Township	41.03	66.03		Slate Hill Road	
Cumberland	Lower Allen Township	41.76	67.21		Lower Allen Drive	
Cumberland	Camp Hill	42.49	68.38		US 11 south / PA 581 to I-81 / I-83 – Carlisle, Harrisburg, York	Exit 5 on PA 581; southern end of US 11 concurrency
Cumberland	Camp Hill	42.49	68.38	Northern end of freeway section		
Cumberland	Camp Hill	42.99	69.19		PA 641 west (Trindle Road) – Mechanicsburg	Eastern terminus of PA 641
Cumberland	Camp Hill–East Pennsboro Township line				M. Harvey Taylor Bridge – Harrisburg	Northbound exit and southbound entrance
Cumberland	East Pennsboro Township	47.34	76.19		PA 944 west (State Street)	Eastern terminus of PA 944
Cumberland	East Pennsboro Township	50.35	81.03		I-81 (Capital Beltway) – Carlisle, Harrisburg	Exit 65 on I-81
Perry	Marysville	52.61	84.67		PA 850 west (Valley Street)	Eastern terminus of PA 850
Perry	Penn Township			Southern end of freeway section		
Perry	Penn Township–Duncannon line	60.10	96.72		PA 274 west – Duncannon	Eastern terminus of PA 274
Dauphin	Reed Township	62.59	100.73		US 22 / US 322 – Harrisburg, Lewistown	
Perry	Watts Township			Northern end of freeway section		
Perry	Buffalo Township	72.78	117.13		PA 34 south (Hunters Valley Road) – Newport	Northern terminus of PA 34
Perry	Liverpool	74.54	119.96		PA 17 west – Millerstown	Eastern terminus of PA 17
Perry	Liverpool Township	78.90	126.98		PA 104 north – Middleburg	Southern terminus of PA 104
Juniata	No major junctions					
Snyder	Penn Township			Southern end of freeway section		
Snyder	Penn Township	91.15	146.69		PA 35 south – Selinsgrove	Northern terminus of PA 35
Snyder	Monroe Township	95.58	153.82		US 522 south – Selinsgrove	Northern terminus of US 522
Snyder	Monroe Township			Northern end of freeway section		
Snyder	Shamokin Dam	96.63	155.51		PA 61 south / PA 147 south – Sunbury	Interchange; northern terminus of PA 61; southern end of PA 147 concurrency
Snyder	Shamokin Dam	96.98	156.07		US 11 north – Northumberland, Danville	Northern end of US 11 concurrency
Union	Union Township				PA 147 north (Central Susquehanna Valley Thruway) to I-80 / I-180 – Milton	Interchange; northern end of PA 147 concurrency
Union	Union Township	101.83	163.88		PA 304 west – New Berlin	Eastern terminus of PA 304
Union	East Buffalo Township–Lewisburg line	105.79	170.25		PA 45 (Market Street) – Lewisburg Business District	
Union	Lewisburg	106.25	170.99		PA 192 west (Buffalo Road) – Cowan	Eastern terminus of PA 192
Union	Kelly Township			Southern end of freeway section		
Union	Kelly Township	110.21	177.37		PA 642 east (Mahoning Street) – Milton, West Milton, Pottsgrove	Western terminus of PA 642
Union	White Deer Township	111.78	179.89		New Columbia	
Union	White Deer Township	112.57	181.16		I-80 – Bloomsburg, Bellefonte	Exit 210 on I-80
Union	White Deer Township	114.29	183.93		Watsontown, White Deer	
Union	White Deer Township			Northern end of freeway section		
Union	Gregg Township	116.81	187.99		PA 44 (Bridge Avenue) – Jersey Shore, Dewart	
Lycoming	Clinton Township	122.66	197.40		PA 54 east – Montgomery	Western terminus of PA 54
Lycoming	South Williamsport	128.34	206.54		PA 554 south (South Market Street)	Northern terminus of PA 554
Lycoming	South Williamsport	128.95	207.52		PA 654 west (Southern Avenue)	Eastern terminus of PA 654
Lycoming	Williamsport	129.35	208.17	Southern end of freeway section		
Lycoming	Williamsport	129.35	208.17	27A	I-180 east / US 220 north – Montoursville, Muncy	Southern end of I-180/US 220 concurrency
Lycoming	Williamsport	129.85	208.97	27B	Hepburn Street	Eastbound exit and westbound entrance
Lycoming	Williamsport	130.53	210.07	28	Maynard Street	Access to Pennsylvania College of Technology
Lycoming	Williamsport	131.67	211.90	29	Future I-99 south / US 220 south – Lock Haven I-180 ends	Northern end of US 220 concurrency; current southern terminus of I-99; exit number not signed southbound
Lycoming	Williamsport	132.09	212.58	136	Third Street	Northbound exit and entrance
Lycoming	Williamsport	132.37	213.03	136	Fourth Street	Southbound exit and entrance
Lycoming	Old Lycoming Township	132.99	214.03	137	Foy Avenue / High Street / Lycoming Creek Road	
Lycoming	Lycoming Township	136.34	219.42	140	Hepburnville	
Lycoming	Lycoming Township	138.90	223.54	143	PA 973 – Perryville, Cogan Station	Southbound exit only
Lycoming	Lewis Township	144.00	231.75	148	PA 14 north – Trout Run, Canton	Southern terminus of PA 14
Lycoming	Cogan House Township	148.27	238.62	152	Cogan House	Southbound exit and entrance; access via State Route 4011
Lycoming	Cogan House Township	148.89	239.62	152	Cogan House	Northbound exit and entrance; access via State Route 4011
Lycoming	Cogan House Township	150.90	242.85	155	PA 184 west – Steam Valley	Eastern terminus of PA 184
Lycoming	Jackson Township	153.68	247.32	158	PA 284 west – Buttonwood, English Center	Eastern terminus of PA 284
Tioga	Liberty	158.81	255.58	162	PA 414 – Liberty, Morris	
Tioga	Liberty	160.96	259.04	165	Sebring	
Tioga	Blossburg	168.08	270.50	172	Blossburg	
Tioga	Richmond Township	175.55	282.52	179	US 15 Bus. north / PA 660 west – Canoe Camp, Covington	Southern terminus of US 15 Bus.; eastern terminus of PA 660
Tioga	Mansfield	177.82	286.17	182	US 6 – Mansfield, Wellsboro	Access to Hills Creek State Park and Mansfield University
Tioga	Richmond Township	179.16	288.33	183	US 15 Bus. south (Main Street)	Southbound exit and northbound entrance; northern terminus of US 15 Bus.
Tioga	Tioga Township	187.65	301.99	191	PA 287 – Tioga, Tioga Junction	
Tioga	Lawrence Township	192.46	309.73	196	PA 49 – Elkland, Lawrenceville	Access to Cowanesque Lake
Tioga	Lawrenceville	194.89	313.65		I-99 north / US 15 north – Corning	Continuation into New York
1.000 mi = 1.609 km; 1.000 km = 0.621 mi: Concurrency terminus; Electronic toll collection; Incomplete access

== See also ==
U.S. Route 15
Previous state: Maryland	Pennsylvania	Next state: New York
