= Veterans Memorial Bridge (Sunbury, Pennsylvania) =

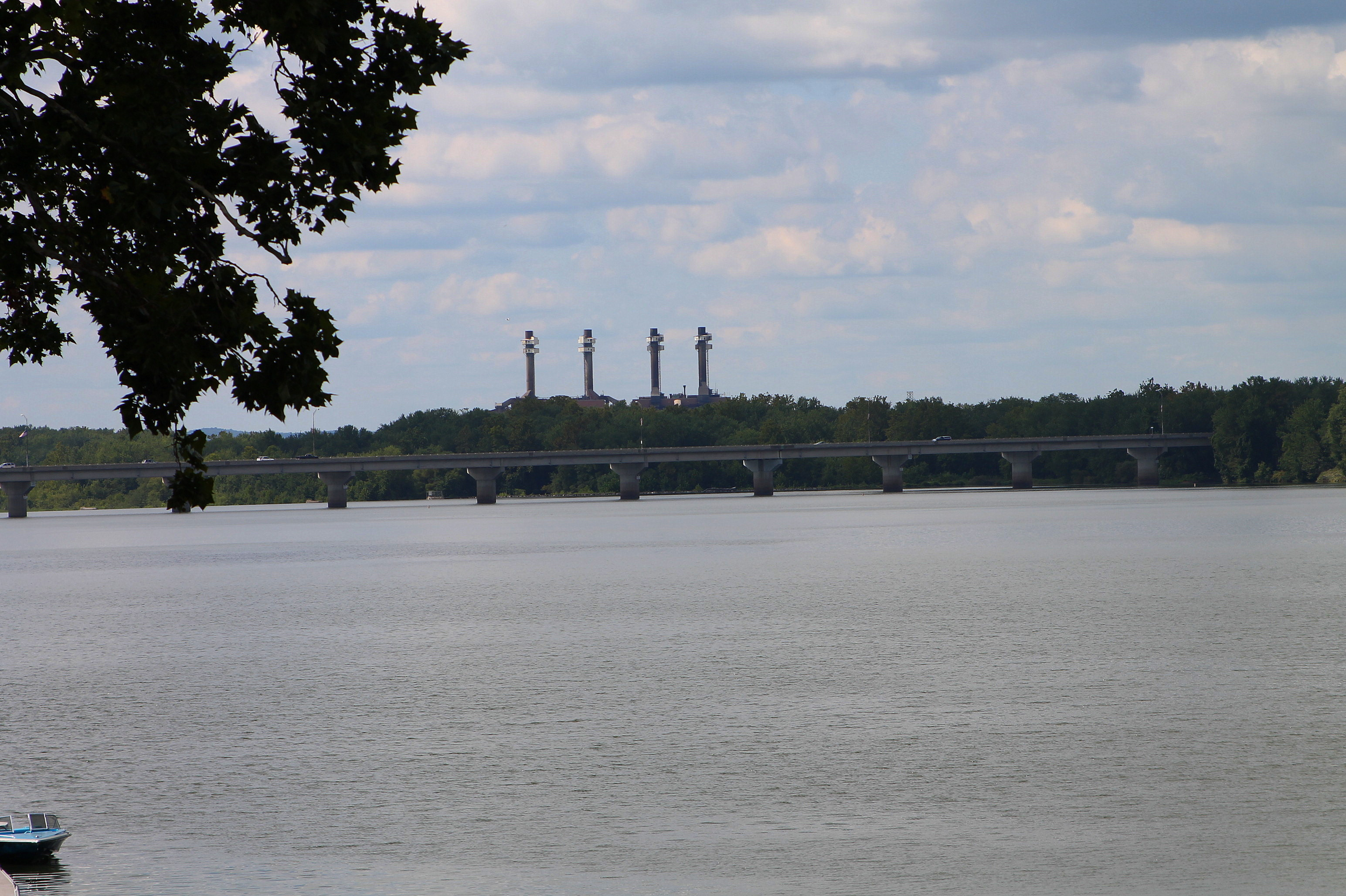
- Veterans Memorial Bridge from Sunbury
- Coordinates: 40°51′05″N 76°48′25″W
- Carries: 4 lanes of PA 61 / PA 147
- Crosses: Susquehanna River
- Locale: Shamokin Dam, Pennsylvania and Sunbury, Pennsylvania

The Veterans Memorial Bridge is a prestressed concrete continuous stringer/multi-beam highway bridge that carries Pennsylvania Routes 61 and 147 across the Susquehanna River near Sunbury, Pennsylvania. It is 2908 feet (886.4 m) long, composed of nineteen spans of 149 feet (45.4 m) each with a 149-foot (45.4 m) approach span, and was opened in 1986 to replace the upstream Bainbridge Street Bridge.
