= Dewart, Pennsylvania =

Unincorporated community in Pennsylvania, US

Coordinates: 41°06′33″N 76°52′35″W

- Census-designated place
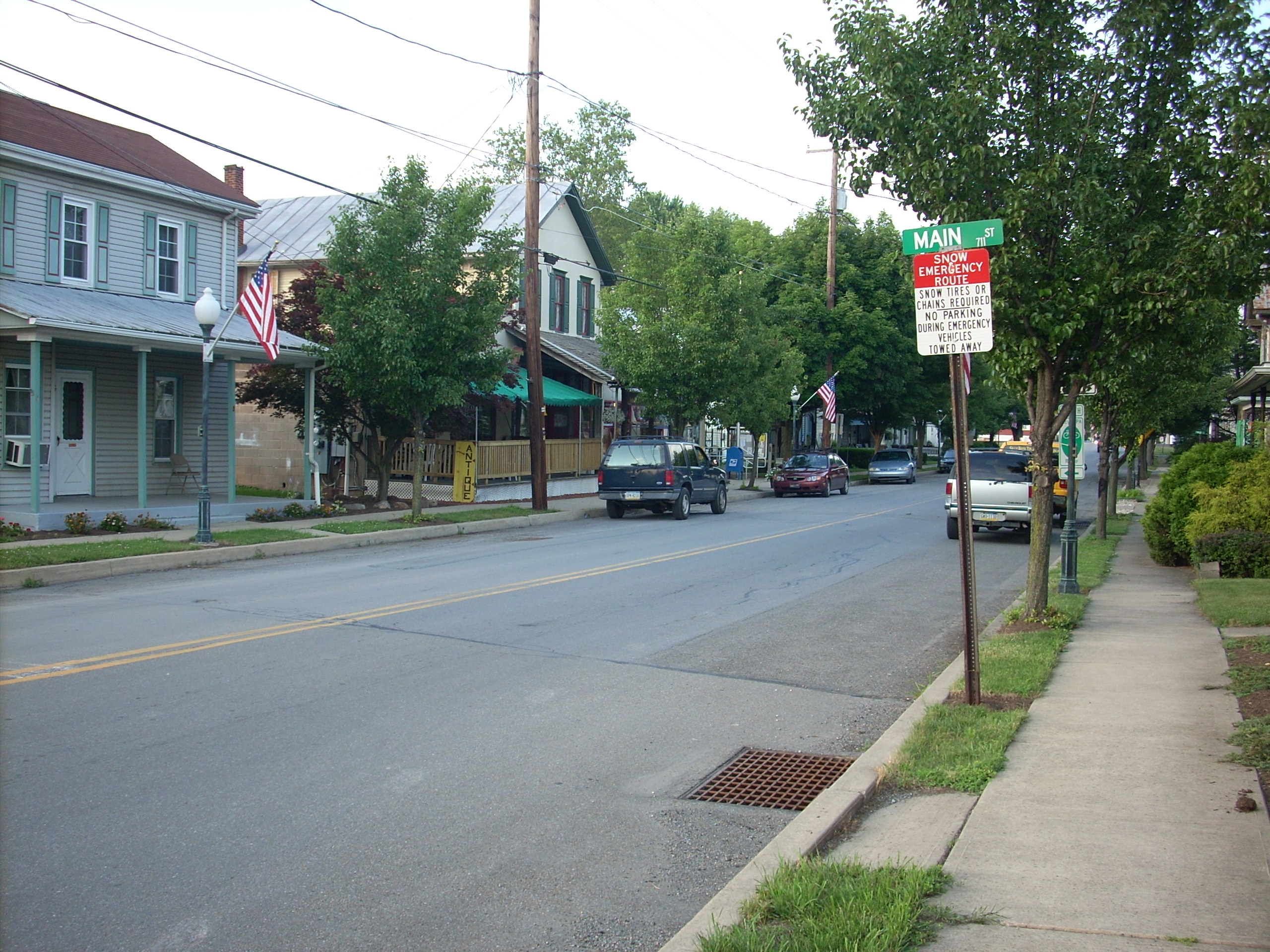
- Street in Dewart
- Interactive map of Dewart, Pennsylvania
- Country: United States
- State: Pennsylvania
- County: Northumberland

Area
  - Total: 2.04 sq mi (5.28 km^{2})
  - Land: 2.04 sq mi (5.28 km^{2})
  - Water: 0 sq mi (0.00 km^{2})

Population (2020)
  - Total: 1,385
  - Density: 679.8/sq mi (262.46/km^{2})
- Time zone: UTC-5 (Eastern (EST))
  - Summer (DST): UTC-4 (EDT)
- ZIP code: 17777
- Area codes: 272 and 570
- FIPS code: 42-19048

Dewart is a census-designated place located in Delaware Township, Northumberland County in the state of Pennsylvania. The community is located very close to the West Branch Susquehanna River along Pennsylvania Route 405 in far northern Northumberland County. As of the 2010 census the population was 1,471 residents.

== Demographics ==
Historical population
Census	Pop.	Note	%±
2020	1,385		—
U.S. Decennial Census

== Education ==
The school district is Warrior Run School District.
