= Montandon, Pennsylvania =

Unincorporated community in Pennsylvania, US

Coordinates: 40°57′53″N 76°51′17″W

- Census-designated place
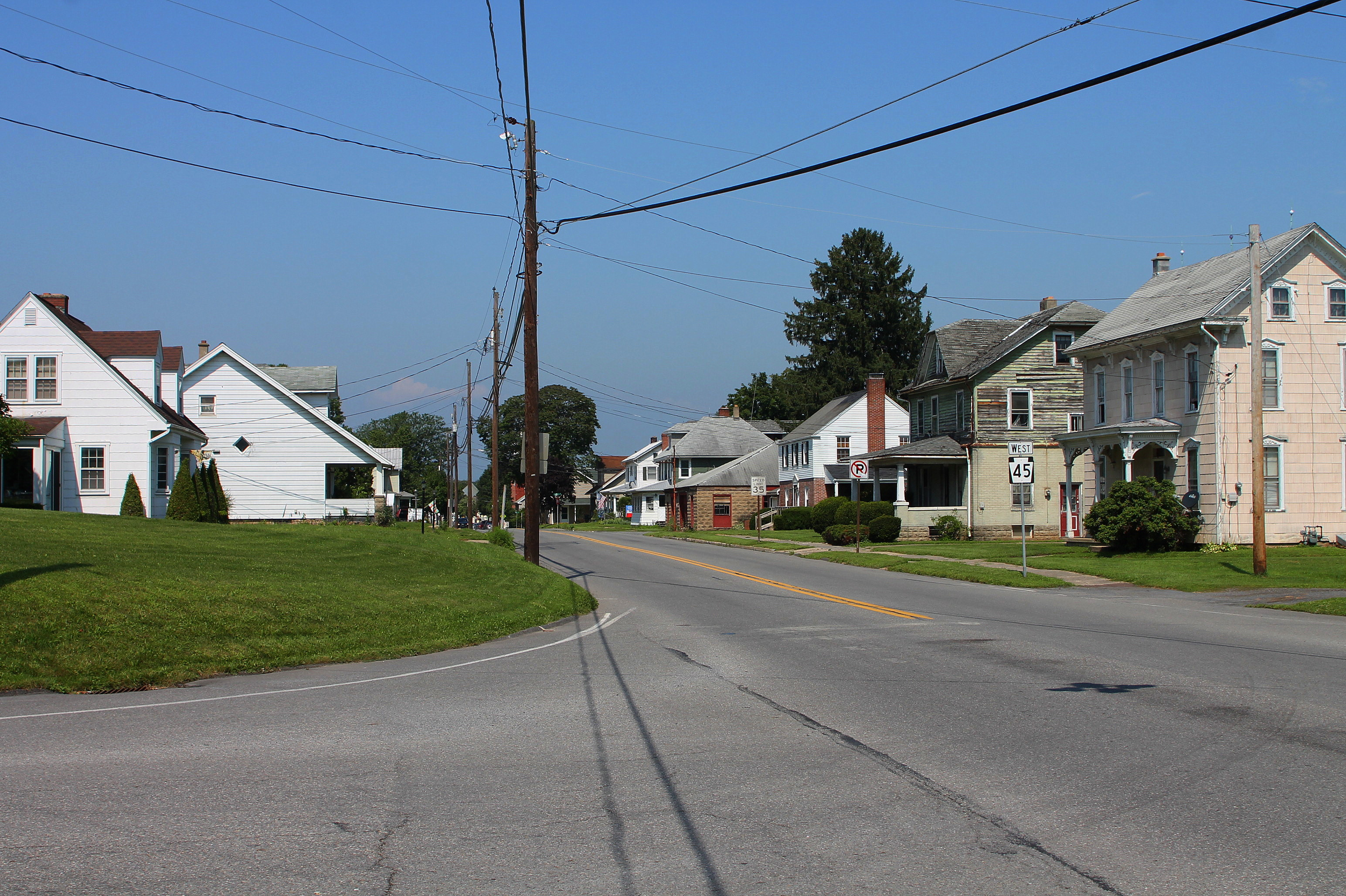
- Pennsylvania Route 45 in Montandon
- Interactive map of Montandon, Pennsylvania
- Country: United States
- State: Pennsylvania
- County: Northumberland

Area
  - Total: 0.88 sq mi (2.27 km^{2})
  - Land: 0.88 sq mi (2.27 km^{2})
  - Water: 0 sq mi (0.00 km^{2})

Population (2020)
  - Total: 873
  - Density: 996.1/sq mi (384.59/km^{2})
- Time zone: UTC-5 (Eastern (EST))
  - Summer (DST): UTC-4 (EDT)
- ZIP code: 17850
- Area codes: 272 and 570
- FIPS code: 42-50552

Montandon is a census-designated place located in West Chillisquaque Township, Northumberland County in the state of Pennsylvania, United States. The community lies near the West Branch Susquehanna River, at the intersection of Pennsylvania Routes 147 and 45, roughly halfway between the boroughs of Northumberland and Milton. As of the 2010 census the population was 903.

== Demographics ==
Historical population
Census	Pop.	Note	%±
2020	873		—
U.S. Decennial Census

== Education ==
It is in the Milton Area School District.
