= Clarks Ferry Bridge =

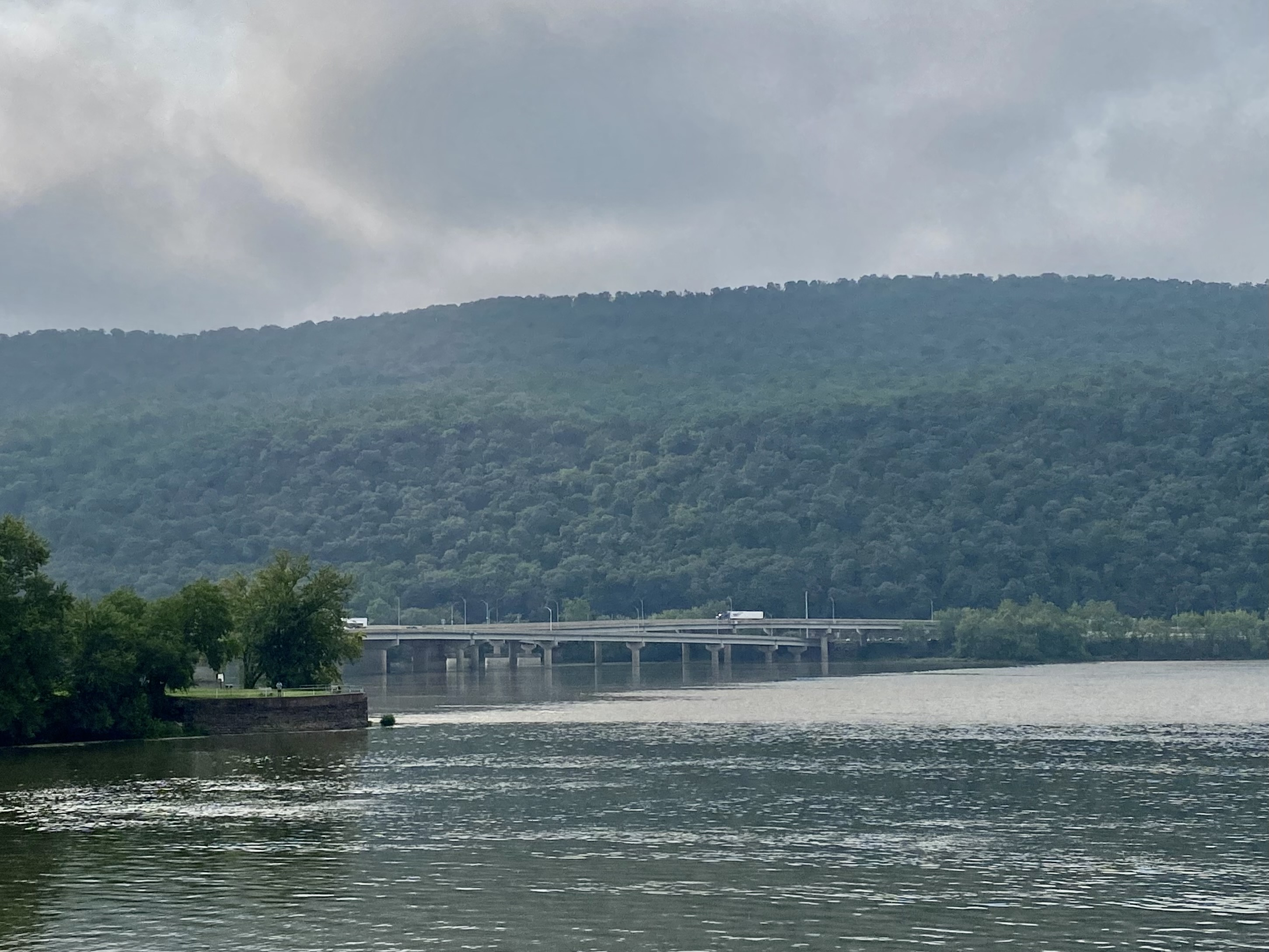
- Clarks Ferry Bridge as seen from North Market Street
- Coordinates: 40°23′59″N 77°00′33″W
- Carries: 4 lanes of US 22 / US 322 / BicyclePA Route J and Appalachian Trail
- Crosses: Susquehanna River
- Locale: Dauphin County, Pennsylvania, U.S.
- Maintained by: PennDOT

Characteristics
- Design: Plate girder bridge

History
- Opened: 1828 (first); 1837 (second); 1847 (third); 1852 (fourth); 1859 (fifth); 1925 (sixth); 1986 (current span)

Statistics
- Toll: None

Location
- Interactive map of Clarks Ferry Bridge

The Clarks Ferry Bridge is a plate girder bridge that carries U.S. Routes 22 and 322 across the Susquehanna River near Duncannon, Pennsylvania, about 20 miles north of Harrisburg, Pennsylvania. It is a 4 lane expressway standard bridge. The bridge also provides safe passage for hikers, bikers, and pedestrians using the Appalachian Trail and BicyclePA Route J. It was completed in November 1986 replacing a 1925 concrete arch toll bridge. At this location, 7 different bridges have crossed the river.

== History ==
The bridge's name is derived from John Clark, a Scottish settler who in 1788 operated a ferry across the river and the next year established a tavern on the West Shore to cater to riders. After John and his oldest son Daniel both died in 1800, youngest son Robert inherited and continued to successfully operate the ferry and tavern. It became such a large draw to travelers that the Commonwealth of Pennsylvania decided by the mid 1820's that a permanent bridge should be established.

An earliest covered bridge was at this site, constructed between 1827-1828 and was a part of the Main Line Pennsylvania Canal built in 1828. Within a decade, a span of the bridge was demolished in a flood and it was rebuilt. Mules walked on a cantilevered walkway outside the structure and towed canal boats across the river. The dam below the bridge was known as Green's Dam and created a calm surface for the canal boats. In 1842, Charles Dickens wrote in American Notes of his crossing after leaving Harrisburg:

The night was cloudy yet, but moonlight too: and when we crossed the Susquehanna river— over which there is an extraordinary wooden bridge with two galleries, one above the other, so that even there, two boat teams meeting, may pass without confusion—it was wild and grand.

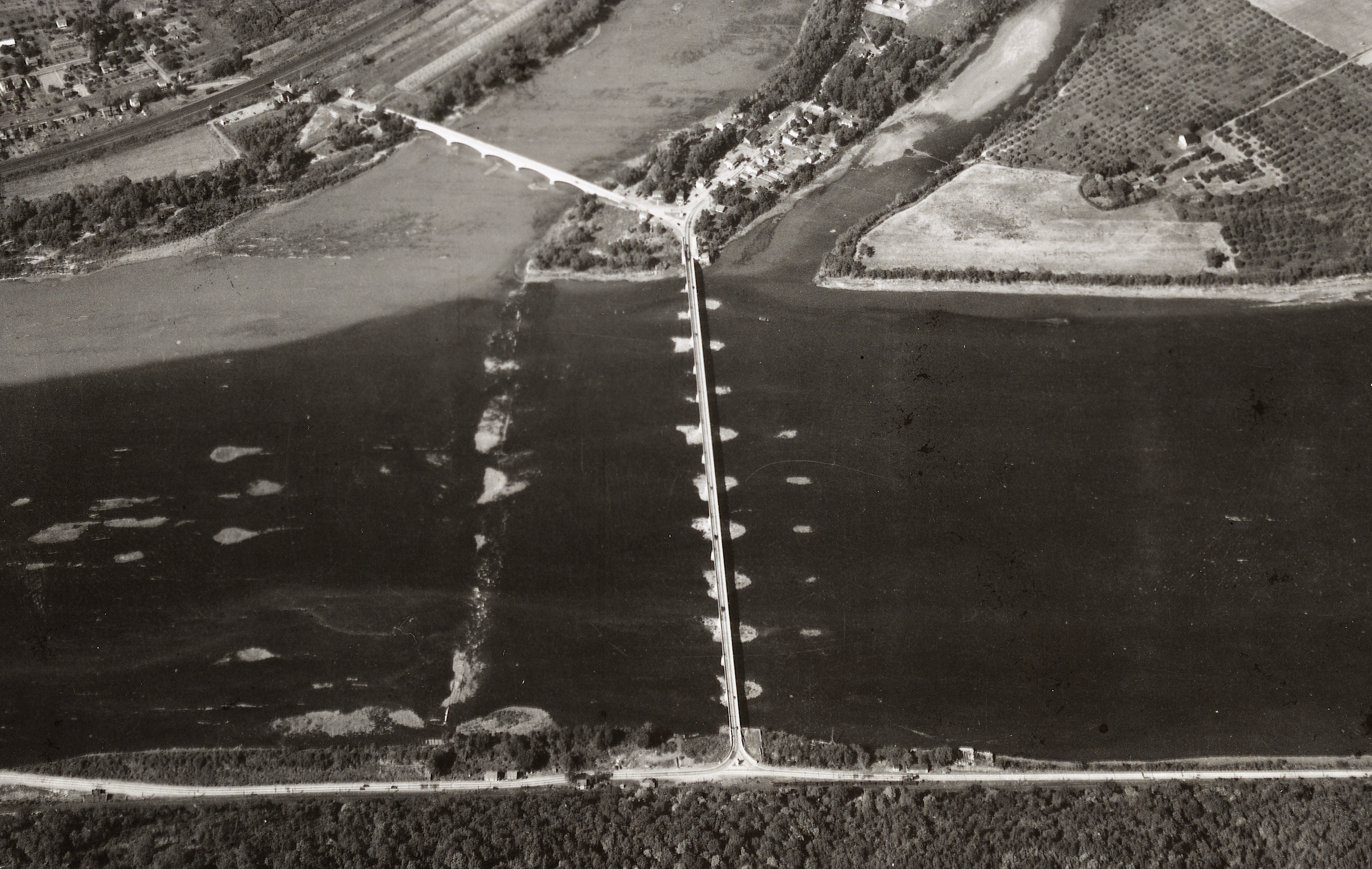
Clarks Ferry Bridge and Green's Dam 1936

Following an act of arson, the third bridge was built between 1846-1847, but was destroyed in September 1850 from another fire. The fourth bridge was constructed between 1851-1852 and in 1857 was purchased by the Pennsylvania Railroad. A violent windstorm in March 1859 destroyed 9 of 10 spans of the bridge. The fifth bridge, also covered, operated from 1859 initially with the tow path gallery. In 1888, the bridge was considered at the time to be the longest covered bridge in the world at 2088 feet.

Following large volume, it was replaced in 1925 with a two-lane concrete arch bridge. This bridge carried a toll until 1957, and was replaced with the current bridge in 1986.

== Future ==
In 2022, the Pennsylvania Department of Transportation announced an improvement project for the bridge, including rehabilitation of the concrete deck, addition of a concrete barrier North of the bridge (replacing the current center turning lane in place), and safety improvements to the adjacent interchange with U.S. Route 11 and U.S. Route 15. Construction is anticipated to start in 2026.

== See also ==
- List of crossings of the Susquehanna River
