= Shamokin Dam, Pennsylvania =

Borough in Pennsylvania, United States

- Borough
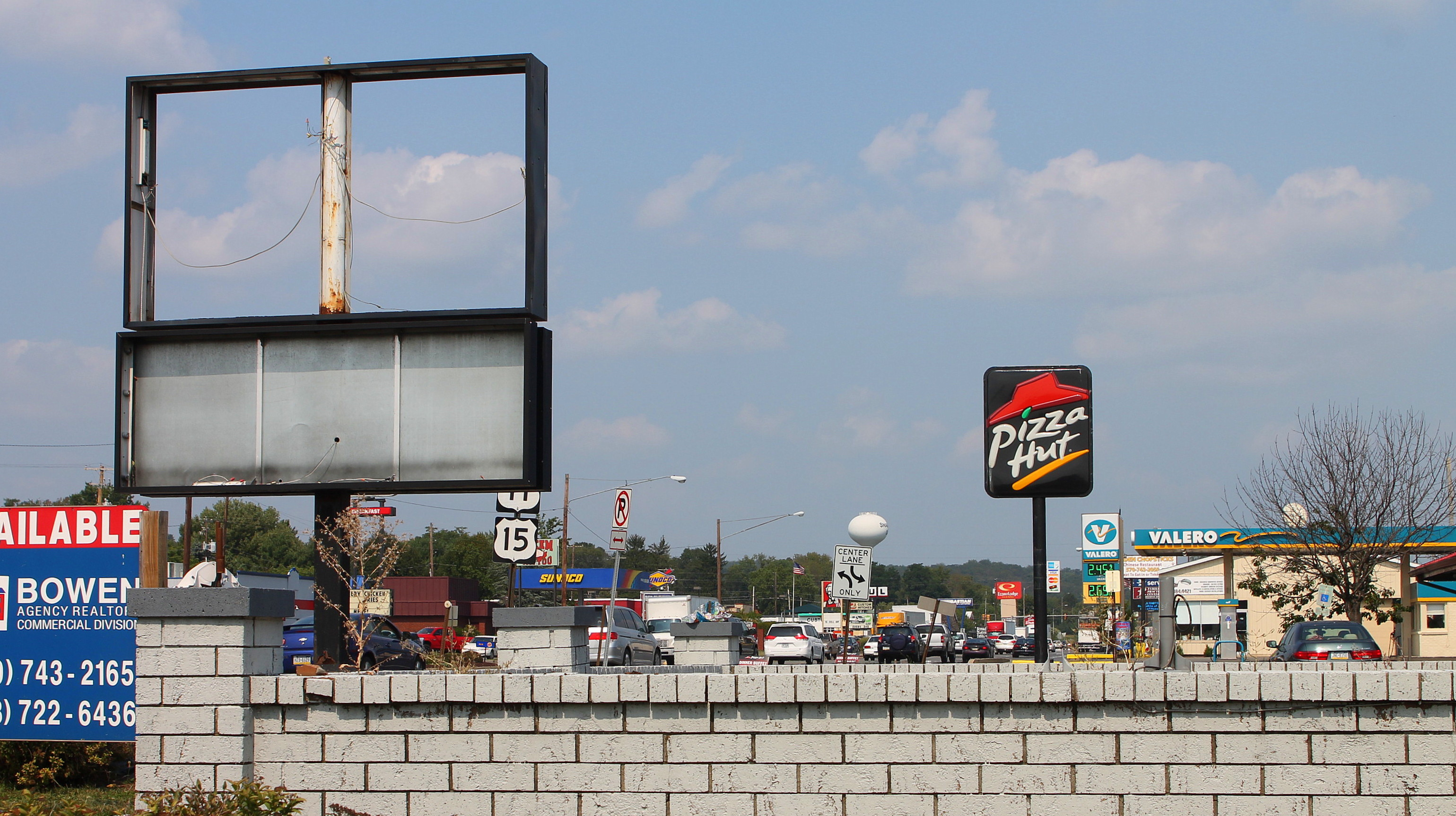
- Development along US Route 11/15 in Shamokin Dam

- Seal

- Location of Shamokin Dam in Snyder County, Pennsylvania.

- Location within the U.S. state of Pennsylvania Shamokin Dam (the United States)
- Coordinates: 40°50′56″N 76°49′16″W
- Country: United States
- State: Pennsylvania
- County: Snyder

Area
  - Total: 1.88 sq mi (4.88 km^{2})
  - Land: 1.85 sq mi (4.78 km^{2})
  - Water: 0.039 sq mi (0.10 km^{2})
- Elevation (center of borough): 499 ft (152 m)
- Highest elevation (hill in northern part of borough): 780 ft (240 m)
- Lowest elevation (Susquehanna River): 418 ft (127 m)

Population (2020)
  - Total: 1,652
  - Density: 895.5/sq mi (345.77/km^{2})
- Time zone: Eastern (EST)
  - Summer (DST): EDT
- ZIP Code: 17876
- Area codes: 570 and 272
- FIPS code: 42-69616
- Website: www.shamokindam.net

Shamokin Dam is a borough in Snyder County, Pennsylvania, United States. The population was 1,647 at the 2020 census.

"Shamokin" /ʃəˈmoʊkɪn/, or "Shahëmokink" in the Delaware language, and Schahamokink in another Algonquian language, means "place of eels." The borough name is also derived from a 10-foot-tall (3.0 m) dam that was built across the Susquehanna River in the 19th century. The dam supported steamboat ferries run by Ira T. Clement, which transported goods and people between Shamokin Dam and the city of Sunbury on the Northumberland County side of the river. These ferries operated from 1772 until the Bainbridge Street Bridge was built in 1907. The dam also provided water to the Susquehanna Division of the Pennsylvania Canal System, which was constructed on the western bank of the river. The dam was destroyed by ice in March 1904. Shamokin Dam is distinct from the city of Shamokin, Pennsylvania, which is located about 14 miles to the east in Northumberland County.

== Geography ==
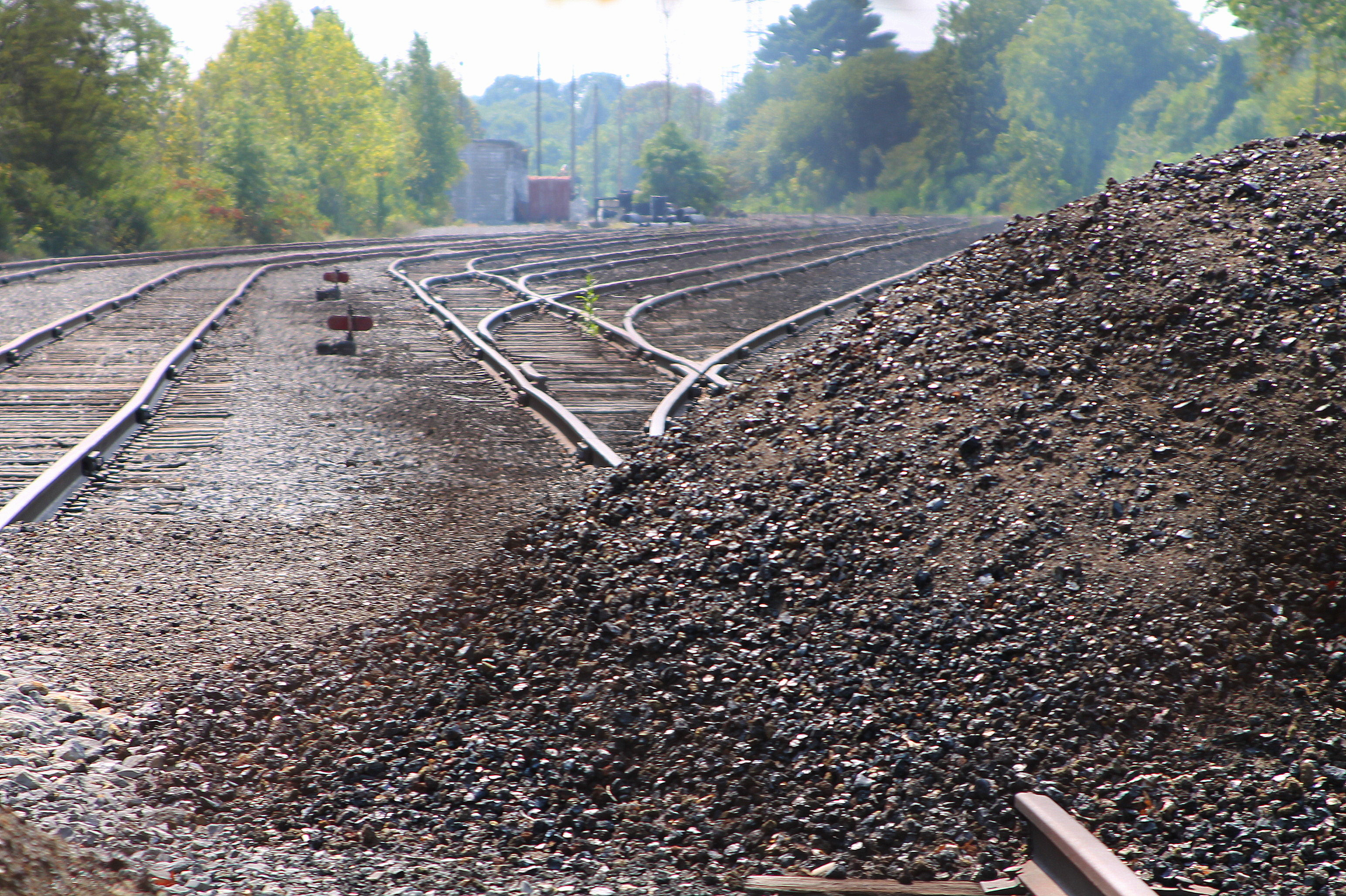
Railroads off E. 8th Ave in Shamokin Dam

According to the United States Census Bureau, the borough has a total area of 1.9 square miles (4.9 km^{2}), of which 1.8 square miles (4.7 km^{2}) is land and 0.1 square miles (0.26 km^{2}) (2.66%) is water.

Shamokin Dam sits on the western bank of the Susquehanna River, just south of the confluence of the river's west and north branches. The borough is also bordered by the community of Hummels Wharf, Monroe Township, and U.S. Route 15.

The Norfolk Southern Railway (formerly Conrail/Penn Central/Pennsylvania Railroad) passes through the borough between the Old Trail Road and the Susquehanna River.

There are several small, unnamed creeks that cross the borough, eventually draining into the Susquehanna River. Seasonal flooding occurs in the lowlands between the rail line and the river where the canal once passed. Some areas of the borough lie in the 100 year flood plain.

For many years, addresses in Shamokin Dam were listed under the same ZIP code as Selinsgrove, which was 17870. This led to confusion by delivery companies, emergency services and visitors to the region. Additionally, tax funding that should have gone to Shamokin Dam was lost. The implementation of the GIS readdressing program required that several local communities rename streets so that there were no redundancies within the Selinsgrove ZIP code. This prompted Shamokin Dam officials to appeal to the United States Postal Service for a unique ZIP code, which was awarded. Shamokin Dam addresses then became 17876.

== History ==
Pennsylvania was, for centuries, the home of many Native American tribes. During the 17th century the region was dominated by the Haudenosaunee Iroquois Confederacy, which at that time included the Mohawks, the Onondagas, the Cayugas, the Senecas and the Oneidas. Under the Confederacy the area was hunting grounds for the Delaware, Shawnee, Conoy, Monsey, Mohican and Nanticoke peoples. Allumapees was a Delaware chief who lived in Shamokin (now called Sunbury).

A large population of Delaware Indians was forcibly resettled in the area in the early 18th century after they lost rights to their land in the Walking Purchase. Canasatego of the Six Nations, enforcing the Walking Purchase of behalf of George Thomas, Deputy Governor of Pennsylvania, ordered the Delaware Indians to go to two places on the Susquehanna River, one of which was an area that included both present-day Sunbury, Pennsylvania and Shamokin Dam.

From 1727 to 1756, the village of Shamokin was one of the largest and most influential Indian settlements in Pennsylvania. In 1745, Presbyterian missionary David Brainerd described the city as being located on both the east and west sides of the river, and on an island, as well. Brainerd reported that the city housed 300 Indians, half of which were Delawares and the other Seneca and Tutelo.

In 1754, much of the land west of the Susquehanna was transferred from the Six Nations to Pennsylvania at the Albany Congress. However, Shamokin was not sold and was reserved by the Six Nations, "to settle such of our Nations as shall come to us from the Ohio or any others who shall deserve to be in our Alliance." According to Weslager, "the Pennsylvania authorities had no opposition to the Six Nations reserving Wyoming and Shamokin from the sale, since friendly Delawares, including Teedyuskung (also known as Teedyuscung) and his people living in those settlements--and any other Indians who might be placed there--constituted a buffer against Connecticut."

The intersection of Center Street and 6th Avenue in Shamokin Dam.

The French and Indian War brought fighting to much of the region. The Delaware Indian residents of Shamokin remained neutral for much of the early part of the war, in part because a drought and unseasonable frost in Shamokin in 1755 left them without provisions. However, the Delaware Indians at Shamokin joined the war against Pennsylvania and the English after the Gnadenhütten massacre in 1755. Pennsylvania Fort Augusta was built in 1756 at Shamokin. Read more about early history of Shamokin in Shamokin (village).

Shikellamy, of the Oneida people, came to the region. He negotiated with the white settlers on behalf of the native residents. In 1754, Chief Shikellamy negotiated with Conrad Weiser to set the Blue Mountains as the upper limit settlement in the native people's home lands. Weiser told the area's settlers they could not remain. The Six Nations Treaty of 1754 permitted settlements to move west of the Susquehanna River into lands that eventually became Snyder County. Many natives argued they had been cheated by the treaty. Conflicts between the settlers and the native peoples resulted in deaths on both sides. Eventually, the native peoples were pushed out by the white settlers after the French and Indian War.

Germans were among the first European settlers in the region. Their influence continues today in the presence of the Amish and Mennonite sects.

Shamokin Dam was founded by George Keen in 1745. At the time it was named Keensville. Most of the residents were canal workers, raftsmen, shad fishermen and eel fishermen. Restaurants and hotels provided support for the workers and travelers. A lock for the Pennsylvania Canal was located on the riverbank. Most of the local commerce revolved around transportation and supporting the canal. In 1907 a toll bridge was completed that connected Shamokin Dam to Sunbury the county seat of Northumberland County. The cost for construction was $150,000. A full-time toll collector lived in the house that straddled the bridge. A gate closed the bridge at night. A bell was posted to summon the toll worker during the night. The bridge was used by pedestrians, buggies and motor cars. The toll was 3 cents for walkers, 4 cents for bicyclists, with 15 cents for horses, buggies and motor cars.

== Demographics ==
Historical population
Census	Pop.	Note	%±
1880	307		—
1930	738		—
1940	764		3.5%
1950	730		−4.5%
1960	1,093		49.7%
1970	1,562		42.9%
1980	1,622		3.8%
1990	1,690		4.2%
2000	1,502		−11.1%
2010	1,686		12.3%
2020	1,652		−2.0%
2021 (est.)	1,636	▼	−1.0%

As of the census of 2000, there were 1,502 people, 688 households, and 436 families residing in the borough. The population density was 821.7 inhabitants per square mile (317.3/km^{2}). There were 726 housing units at an average density of 397.2 per square mile (153.4/km^{2}). The racial makeup of the borough was 97.94% White, 0.60% African American, 0.13% Native American, 0.80% Asian, 0.33% from other races, and 0.20% from two or more races. Hispanic or Latino of any race were 0.87% of the population.

There were 688 households, out of which 23.0% had children under the age of 18 living with them, 53.9% were married couples living together, 6.8% had a female householder with no husband present, and 36.5% were non-families. 33.7% of all households were made up of individuals, and 21.5% had someone living alone who was 65 years of age or older. The average household size was 2.18 and the average family size was 2.76.

In the borough the population was spread out, with 19.8% under the age of 18, 4.7% from 18 to 24, 24.6% from 25 to 44, 22.2% from 45 to 64, and 28.7% who were 65 years of age or older. The median age was 46 years. For every 100 females, there were 84.1 males. For every 100 females age 18 and over, there were 81.1 males.

The median income for a household in the borough was $34,514, and the median income for a family was $45,461. Males had a median income of $31,711 versus $21,917 for females. The per capita income for the borough was $19,923. About 3.9% of families and 8.4% of the population were below the poverty line, including 10.6% of those under age 18 and 12.2% of those age 65 or over.

== Economics ==
The coal fired Sunbury power plant was commissioned by the PPL Corporation company in 1949. It went into operation in 1953. Sunbury Generation Station is located along the Susquehanna River in Shamokin Dam, Pennsylvania. The plant was purchased by WPS Power Development in November 1999 from PP&L Resources. The plant is part of the Pennsylvania/New Jersey/Maryland (PJM) market area. Power from the plant is sold into Pennsylvania's deregulated electric market. In May 2005, the facility's emission allowances for both sulfur dioxide (SO_{2}) and nitrogen oxides (NO_{X}) were sold and a seasonal operation plan was announced. Then in July 2006 the plant was sold to Corona Power, LLC. The gross proceeds received by WPS for the 421.7 megawatt power plant were about $34.6 million, and were subject to certain working capital and other post-closing adjustments. In 2006, Corona Power, LLC sought and won a substantial reduction in the tax assessment of the property. The assessment was cut by more than two thirds. Additionally, there is a freeze on the assessment for several years regardless of improvements made on the property.

U.S. Routes 11 and 15 pass through the borough. The highway is a major travel artery through the region.

== Parks and recreation ==
- Weller Field is an upscale, community baseball field. It was dedicated in 1990, in honor of Dr. Carl A. Weller who served on the borough council. Access to the facility is from Garden Circle. Off street parking located in the 11th Ave. Park. Weller Field also has recently added a dog park with fenced space for both large and small dogs. The park at "Weller Field" features restrooms, benches, playground equipment and a walking woodland trail. It is open from dawn to dusk. Access is from Garden Circle. Off street parking is provided.
- Attig Park has a playground and picnic pavilion. It is located at 8th Ave and Cherry Street. There is on street parking. It is named in honor of Charles Attig, Jr., a Shamokin Dam Police Officer killed in the line of duty.
- Fabridam Park, featuring the Adam T. Bower Memorial Dam, is located off the Old Trail near the Veterans Memorial Bridge to Sunbury, Northumberland County. There is a picnic shelter, playground equipment and woods to explore. Located along the Susquehanna River, there is access for kayaking, canoeing and fishing. Off street parking is available within the park. The state is currently constructing a "fish ladder" to permit shad to continue up the river.
- Jack Treas Park, named in honor of the longtime mayor, is located on the Old Trail below the Veterans Memorial Bridge. The park features rest rooms, two large covered picnic pavilions with kitchen facilities, basketball court, playground equipment and open space for other forms of recreation.

== Cemeteries ==
- Orchard Hills Cemetery behind the Orchard Hill Shopping Center on rtes. 11&15. Formerly known as West Side Cemetery.
- Hartman's Family Cemetery on Old Trail Road near the power plant entrance.
- Schreiner's Cemetery Eleventh Ave. and Stetler Ave. Shamokin Dam. Located next to the Susquehanna Valley Baptist Church.

== Emergency services ==
The Shamokin Dam Police Department is located in the Borough Office complex on 8th Avenue. Current department authorized strength is 3 full time and two part time officers. Shamokin Dam Volunteer Fire Department, Company 90, the station house can be found at 3343 North Old Trail. The Americus Community Ambulance Service, which is based in Sunbury, is the primary ambulance service for those living in Shamokin Dam. Call 911 for all emergencies. The closest hospital is Evangelical Community Hospital in Lewisburg.
