= Union Township, Union County, Pennsylvania =

Township in Pennsylvania, US

Coordinates: 40°54′00″N 76°51′59″W

- Township
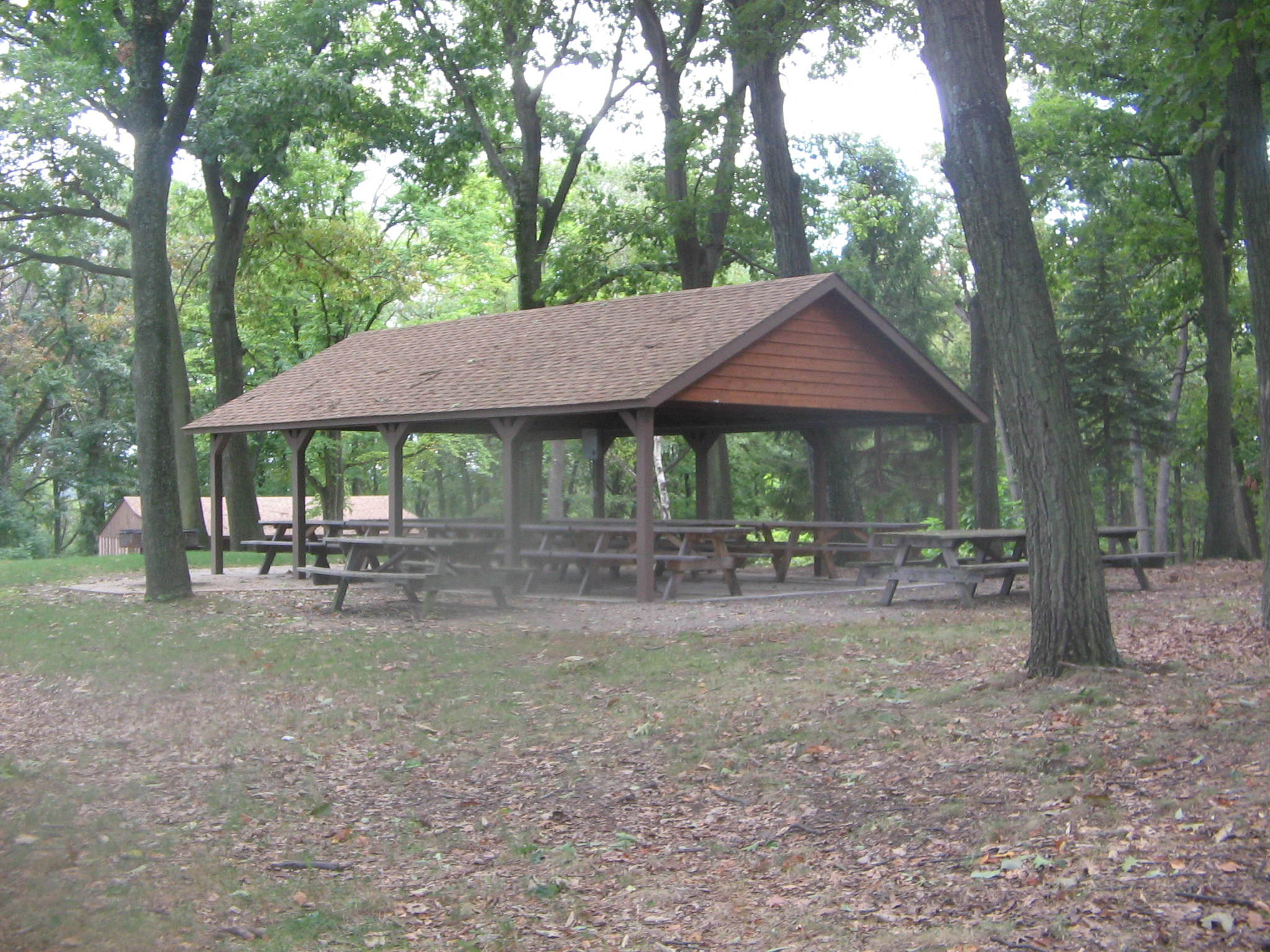
- The scenic overlook and picnic area of Shikellamy State Park a Pennsylvania state park is in Union Township.

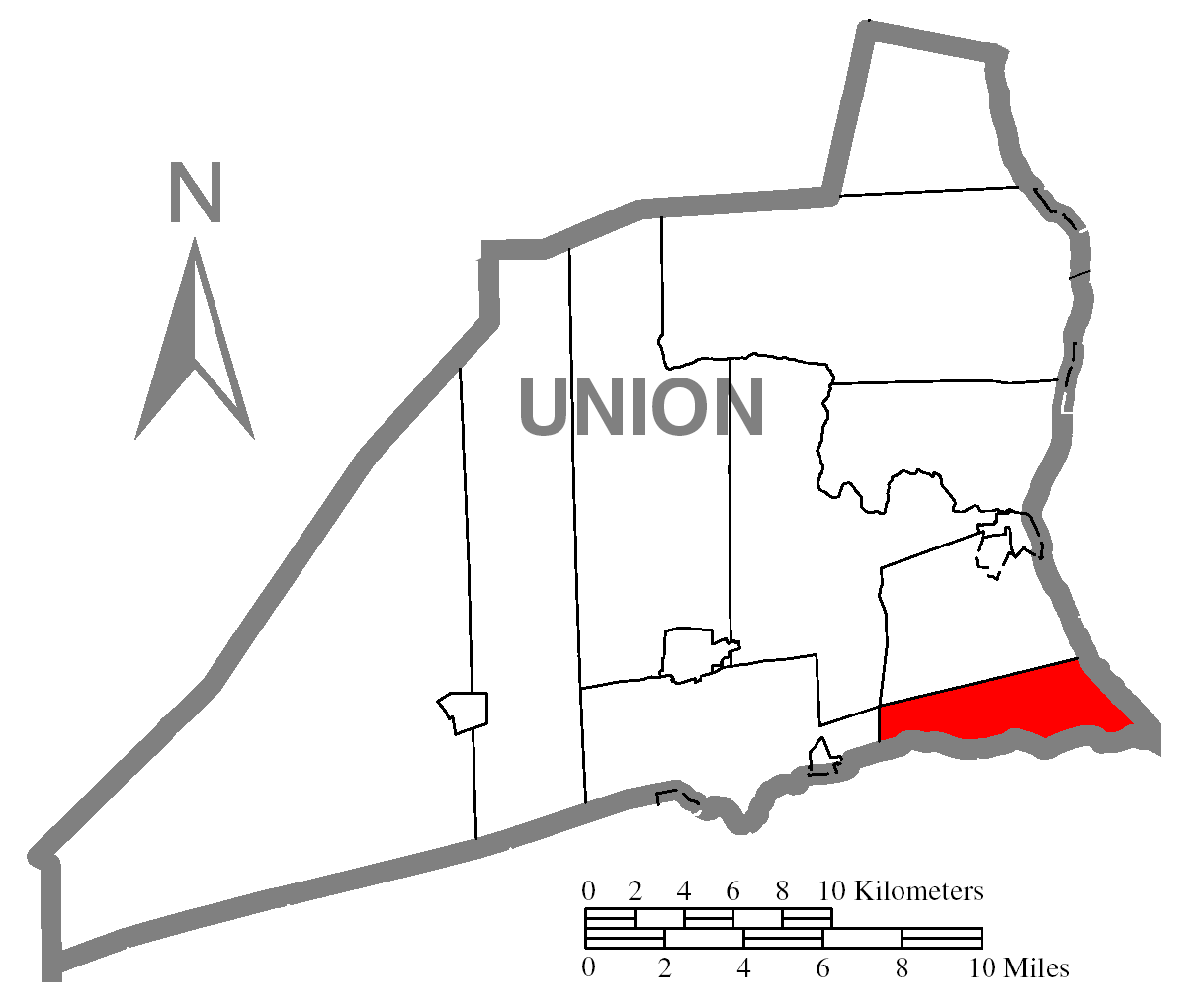
- Map of Union County, Pennsylvania highlighting Union Township

- Map of Pennsylvania highlighting Union County
- Country: United States
- State: Pennsylvania
- County: Union
- Settled: 1769
- Incorporated: 1815

Area
  - Total: 11.21 sq mi (29.03 km^{2})
  - Land: 11.15 sq mi (28.88 km^{2})
  - Water: 0.054 sq mi (0.14 km^{2})

Population (2020)
  - Total: 1,604 ▲
  - Estimate (2021): 1,599
  - Density: 145.1/sq mi (56.02/km^{2})
- Time zone: UTC-5 (EST)
  - Summer (DST): UTC-4 (EDT)
- FIPS code: 42-119-78424

Union Township is a township in Union County, Pennsylvania, United States. The population was 1,604 at the 2020 census. Part of Shikellamy State Park is in Union Township.

== Geography ==
According to the United States Census Bureau, the township has a total area of 10.8 square miles (27.9 km^{2}), all land.

Union Township is bordered by East Buffalo Township to the north, the West Branch Susquehanna River to the east, over which lies Northumberland County, Snyder County to the south and Limestone Township to the west.

The township contains the census-designated place of Winfield.

== Demographics ==
Historical population
Census	Pop.	Note	%±
2010	1,589		—
2020	1,604		0.9%
2021 (est.)	1,599		−0.3%
U.S. Decennial Census

As of the census of 2000, there were 1,427 people, 547 households, and 427 families residing in the township. The population density was 132.6 inhabitants per square mile (51.2/km^{2}). There were 596 housing units at an average density of 55.4 per square mile (21.4/km^{2}). The racial makeup of the township was 97.06% White, 0.28% African American, 1.05% Native American, 0.98% Asian, 0.07% Pacific Islander, 0.07% from other races, and 0.49% from two or more races. Hispanic or Latino of any race were 0.14% of the population.

There were 547 households, out of which 33.5% had children under the age of 18 living with them, 70.6% were married couples living together, 3.7% had a female householder with no husband present, and 21.9% were non-families. 17.2% of all households were made up of individuals, and 6.4% had someone living alone who was 65 years of age or older. The average household size was 2.61 and the average family size was 2.95.

In the township the population was spread out, with 24.5% under the age of 18, 5.4% from 18 to 24, 28.7% from 25 to 44, 29.4% from 45 to 64, and 11.9% who were 65 years of age or older. The median age was 41 years. For every 100 females, there were 106.8 males. For every 100 females age 18 and over, there were 100.2 males.

The median income for a household in the township was $48,289, and the median income for a family was $51,842. Males had a median income of $37,344 versus $22,202 for females. The per capita income for the township was $21,597. About 3.5% of families and 4.3% of the population were below the poverty line, including 3.3% of those under age 18 and 4.5% of those age 65 or over.

== Government ==
The township's polling place is the Township Building, 70 Municipal Lane, Winfield.
