= Sunbury Historic District =

Historic district in Pennsylvania, United States

- U.S. National Register of Historic Places
- U.S. Historic district
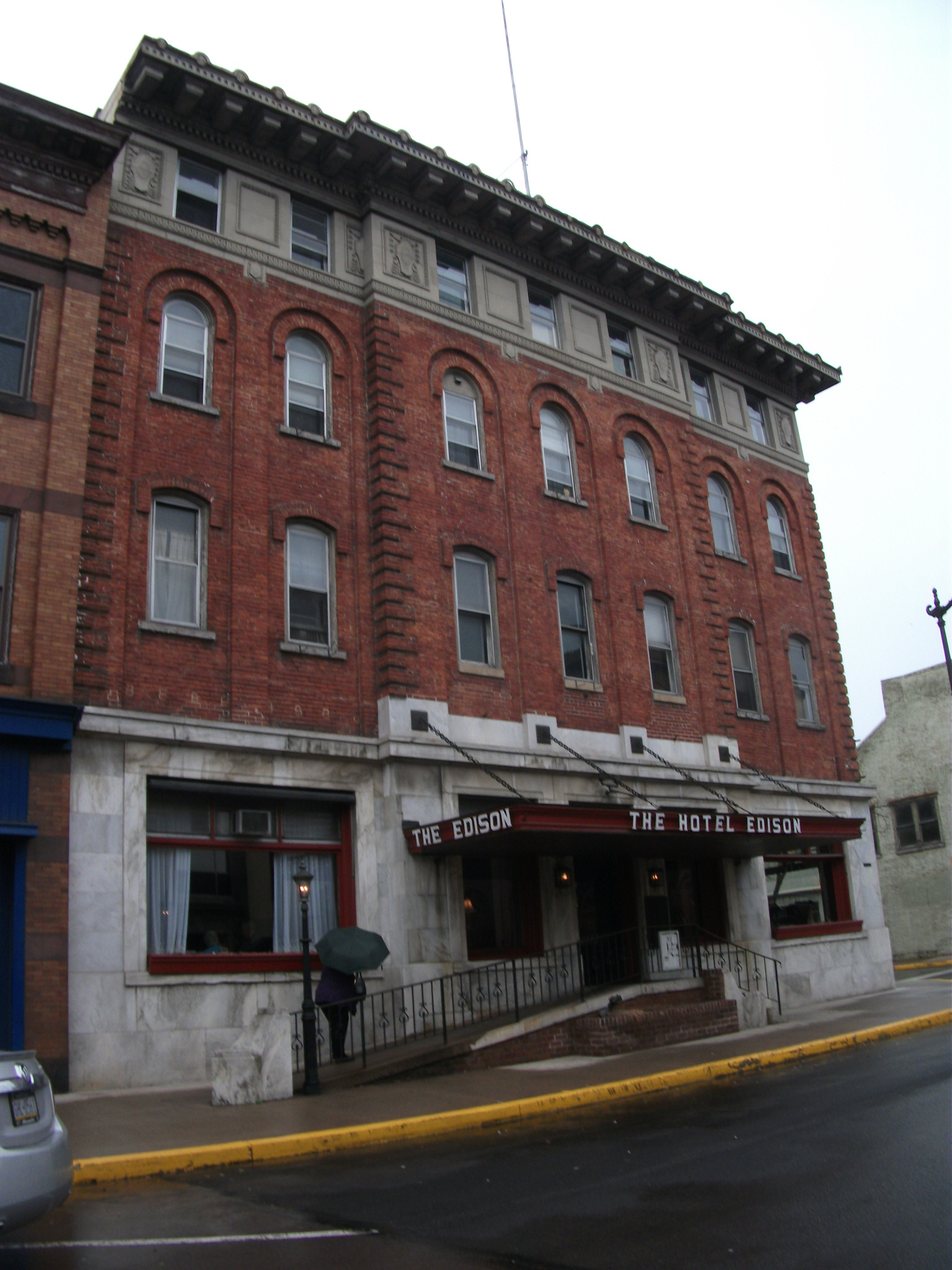
- Edison Hotel in the Sunbury Historic District, April 2011

- Location within Pennsylvania Location within the United States
- Location: Roughly bounded by Arch, Chestnut, Front, and 5th Sts., Sunbury, Pennsylvania
- Coordinates: 40°51′50″N 76°47′21″W
- Area: 65 acres (26 ha)
- Built: ca. 1870
- Architectural style: Late 19th And 20th Century Revivals, Late Victorian
- Demolished: 1914
- Restored: ca. 1918
- NRHP reference No.: 83004240
- Added to NRHP: November 3, 1983

The Sunbury Historic District is a national historic district located at Sunbury, Northumberland County, Pennsylvania. It encompasses 238 contributing buildings in the central business district and surrounding residential areas of Sunbury.

It was added to the National Register of Historic Places in 1983.

== History ==
The Sunbury Historic District was created by the City of Sunbury, Pennsylvania on October 14, 1996, via Ordinance No. 1204 (subsequently amended on September 22, 2006):

"§ 175-116 General provisions. A. District created. This article creates the City of Sunbury Historic District within the geographic boundaries of the City of Sunbury; defines the terms used in this article; defines the boundaries of the Historic District; creates an Historical Architectural Review Board to advise the City Council on issuing certifications of appropriateness for permits to erect, demolish or alter buildings within the Sunbury Historic District; and provides for appeals for refusals and for changes in procedures in the office of Code Enforcement necessary to carry out the provisions of this article and for notifying the Pennsylvania Historical and Museum Commission of the pendency of this article and for obtaining a certificate as to the historic significance of the District within the limits defined in this article....

D. Purpose. This article is enacted to:

(1) Protect an architecturally distinctive and historic area of Sunbury;

(2) Encourage interest in Sunbury's past;

(3) Promote the general welfare and education of the City's people;

(4) Improve property values;

(5) Enhance the City's attractiveness to residents and visitors; and

(6) Stimulate business and strengthen the City's economy."

== Architecture ==
The significant residential buildings in this historic district were constructed of wood or brick, 2 1/2 stories, in a variety of architectural styles including Federal, Colonial Revival, Italianate, and Queen Anne. Notable buildings include the separately listed Northumberland County Courthouse in addition to the Northumberland County Prison (1876), James Tilghman House (1773), Maclay-Wolverton House (1773-1774), Keithan's Store, Central Hotel, Sunbury Textile Mills (1896), Pennsylvania Railroad Passenger Depot, Edison Hotel, Masonic Temple (1907), Chestnut Street Opera House (1901), and Sunbury Market (1901). It was destroyed by a fire in 1914, and the current structure was built in the same place around 1918.

It was added to the National Register of Historic Places in 1983.

== Gallery ==
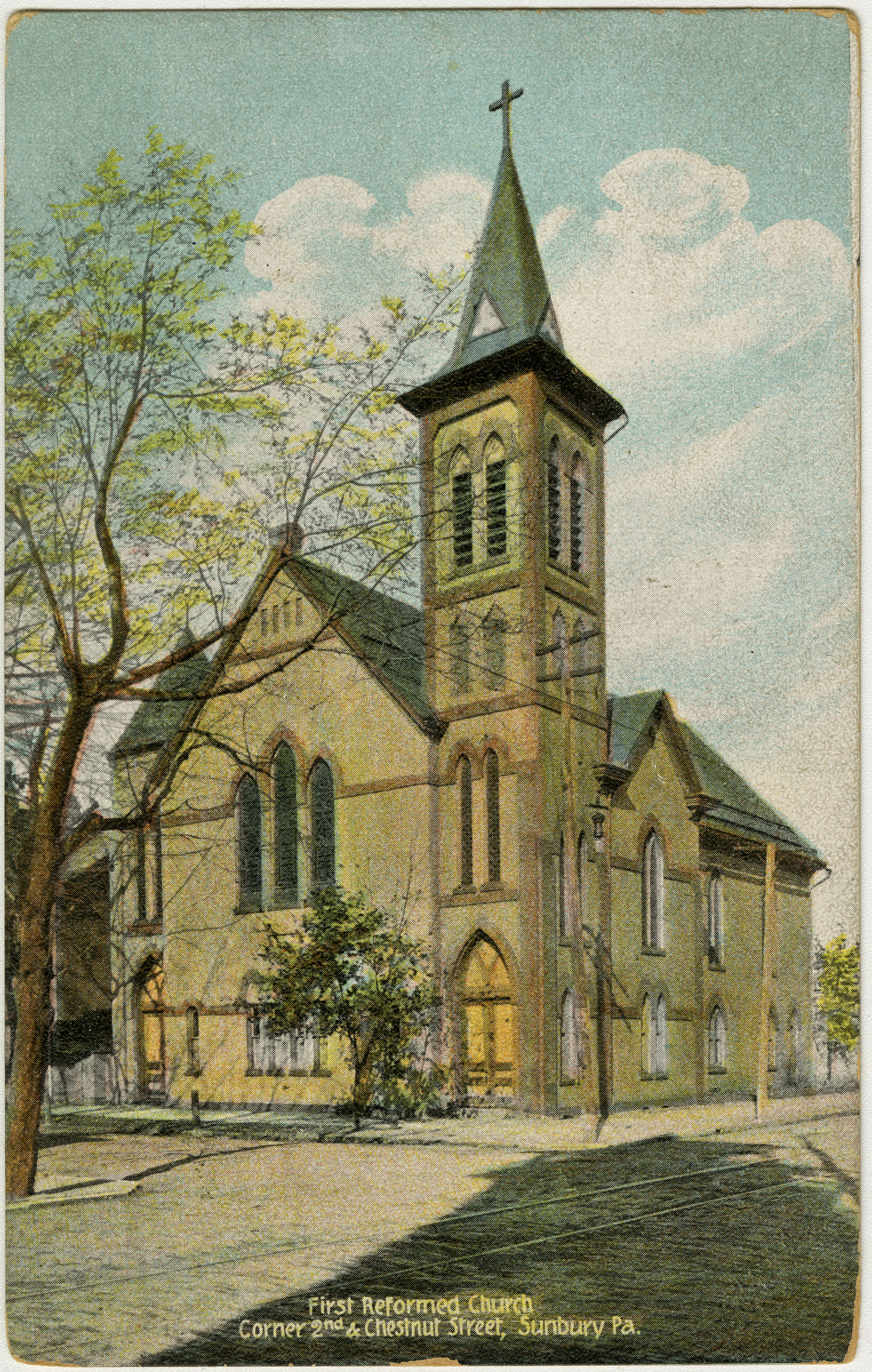
First Reformed Church, at 2nd and Chestnut, on an old postcard

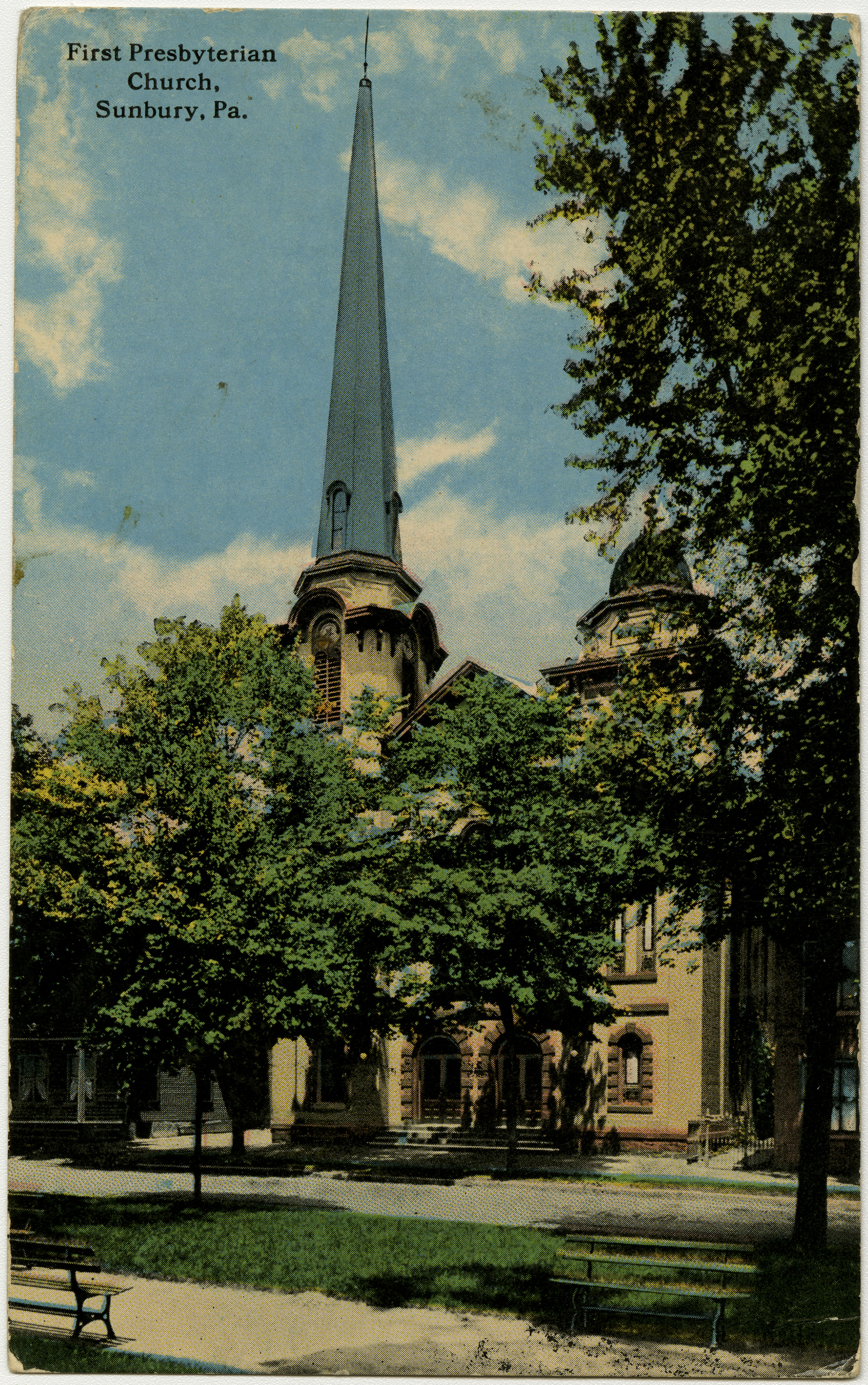
First Presbyterian Church on an old postcard
