= WMLP =

Simulcasts WWPA Williamsport
- Milton, Pennsylvania; United States
- Broadcast area: Sunbury-Selinsgrove-Lewisburg, Pennsylvania
- Frequency: 1380 kHz

Programming
- Format: Conservative talk radio
- Affiliations: Salem Radio Network; Townhall News; Westwood One

Ownership
- Owner: Vic Michael; (Michael Radio Company, LLC)

History
- First air date: October 22, 1955
- Former frequencies: 1570 kHz
- Call sign meaning: Milton, Pennsylvania

Technical information
- Licensing authority: FCC
- Facility ID: 73271
- Class: D
- Power: 1,000 watts (day); 18 watts (night)
- Transmitter coordinates: 40°59′59.71″N 76°52′1.0″W
- Translators: 94.5 W233CP (Milton); 105.7 W284CV (Montoursville)

Links
- Public license information: Public file; LMS
- Webcast: Listen live
- Website: twinvalleystalk.com

WMLP (1380 AM) is a commercial radio station licensed to Milton, Pennsylvania, United States. The station is owned by the Michael Radio Company, LLC, headed by Vic Michael. It broadcasts a conservative talk format sourced from the Salem Radio Network and Westwood One.

Programming is also heard on 99-watt FM translator W233CP at 94.5 MHz.

== History ==
The station signed on the air on October 22, 1955. It originally was a daytimer, required to go off the air at sunset. In 1967, it added an FM station, 100.9 WMLP-FM. Today that station is WVLY-FM.

Former logo

Vic Michael acquired 1380 WMLP from Sunbury Broadcasting Corporation on February 21, 2020.

== Translator ==
Broadcast translator for WMLP
Call sign	Frequency	City of license	FID	ERP (W)	HAAT	Class	Transmitter coordinates	FCC info
W233CP	94.5 FM	Milton, Pennsylvania	200818	99	360 m (1,181 ft)	D	41°11′43.0″N 76°58′17.0″W	LMS
