= WEGH =

- Northumberland, Pennsylvania; United States
- Broadcast area: Sunbury-Selinsgrove-Lewisburg, Pennsylvania
- Frequency: 107.3 MHz
- Branding: Eagle 107

Programming
- Format: Classic rock
- Affiliations: Philadelphia Eagles; Philadelphia Phillies

Ownership
- Owner: Sunbury Broadcasting Corporation
- Sister stations: WKOK, WQKX, WVLY-FM

History
- First air date: 1994
- Former call signs: WAFH (1993–1994); WKOK-FM (1994–1998)

Technical information
- Licensing authority: FCC
- Facility ID: 63893
- Class: A
- ERP: 900 watts
- HAAT: 257 meters (843 ft)
- Transmitter coordinates: 40°47′10.3″N 76°41′47.8″W

Links
- Public license information: Public file; LMS
- Webcast: Listen Live
- Website: eagle107.com

WEGH (107.3 FM, "Eagle 107") is a commercial radio station licensed to serve Northumberland, Pennsylvania. The station is owned by Sunbury Broadcasting Corporation and broadcasts a classic rock format.

WEGH airs Bucknell University Bison football and basketball games, Selinsgrove Area High School Seals football games and Philadelphia Eagles football. New in the spring of 2020 is the addition of Philadelphia Phillies Baseball.

== History ==
Originally assigned the WAFH call sign by the FCC in 1993, the station signed on for the first time in 1994 as WKOK-FM, simulcasting the programming of WKOK. On March 10, 1998, the station's call sign was changed to WEGH and one month later, on April 18, the station re-branded as Eagle 107 with its "Rock ‘N Roll for Adults" slogan.
