= WSFT =

WSFT may refer to:

- WSFT-LP, a radio station (105.5 FM) licensed to Berrien Springs, Michigan
- WOTH, a radio station (107.9 FM) licensed to Williamsport, Pennsylvania which held the call sign WSFT from 1997 to 2002
