= WKOK =

- Sunbury, Pennsylvania; United States
- Broadcast area: Central Pennsylvania
- Frequency: 1070 kHz
- Branding: Newsradio 1070 WKOK

Programming
- Format: News–talk–sports
- Affiliations: Accuweather; Fox Sports Radio; NBC News Radio; USA Radio News; Premiere Networks; Penn State Nittany Lions

Ownership
- Owner: Sunbury Broadcasting Corporation
- Sister stations: WEGH; WQKX; WVLY-FM

History
- First air date: 1925
- Former call signs: WJBU (1925–1933)
- Former frequencies: 1420 kHz 1925-1927); 1400 kHz (1927–1928); 1210 kHz (1928–1941); 1240 kHz (1941–1961)

Technical information
- Licensing authority: FCC
- Facility ID: 63889
- Class: B
- Power: 10,000 watts day; 1,000 watts night
- Transmitter coordinates: 40°52′54.31″N 76°49′9.9″W

Links
- Public license information: Public file; LMS
- Webcast: Listen live
- Website: www.wkok.com

WKOK (1070 AM) is a commercial radio station in Sunbury, Pennsylvania. It is owned by Sunbury Broadcasting Corporation and it broadcasts a combination news, talk and sports radio format. The radio studios and transmitter are on County Line Road in Selinsgrove.

By day, WKOK transmits 10,000 watts non-directional. As 1070 AM is a clear channel frequency reserved for Class A station KNX in Los Angeles, to avoid interference with KNX and other stations on 1070, WKOK must reduce power at night to 1,000 watts and uses a directional antenna with a five-tower array.

== Programming ==
On weekdays, WKOK has news blocks and local talk in morning and afternoon drive time, including forecasts from Accuweather and updates from CBS News Radio. Middays feature two nationally syndicated programs, The Dan Patrick Show and The Ramsey Show with Dave Ramsey. Before sunrise on weekday mornings, This Morning, America's First News with Gordon Deal is heard. Two local talk shows on the station are On The Mark, discussing local news, and The Steve Jones Show, discussing Penn State University sports. In evenings and overnights, WKOK airs Fox Sports Radio.

On weekend mornings, WKOK has a three-hour news block. A nationally syndicated technology show, hosted by Kim Komando, is heard middays on Saturdays. Middays on Sundays feature Meet The Press. During weekend afternoons, evenings and overnights, the station joins Fox Sports Radio.

The station broadcasts Penn State Nittany Lions football and basketball games, as well as Shikellamy High School football, wrestling and basketball games.

== History ==
=== Bucknell University ===
The United States Department of Commerce granted Bucknell University in Lewisburg, Pennsylvania, a license for a radio station on November 6, 1925 (per FCC History Cards). The original call sign, randomly issued from a sequential list, was WJBU. It originally transmitted on 1420 kHz with 100 watts.

The station was reassigned to 1400 kHz on September 3, 1927. It moved again, this time to 1210 kHz on December 28, 1928. By the 1930s, the university decided to divest of the station and offer it to a commercial broadcaster.

=== WKOX ===
On May 12, 1933, the station's license was voluntarily reassigned to Charles S. Blue. The station was moved to Sunbury, Pennsylvania, with studios at 1150 West Front Street. Following the move, the station's call sign was changed to WKOK on July 27, 1933. The station's license was then voluntarily reassigned to Sunbury Broadcasting Corporation on April 13, 1934. WKOK occasionally shared its frequency with WBAX in Wilkes-Barre. When one was on the air, the other had to be silent. This shared time arrangement lasted from October 27, 1936, until June 7, 1939.

The Federal Communications Commission (FCC) granted Sunbury Broadcasting a new license for the station on October 1, 1940, with a power increase to 250 watts. WKOK was reassigned from 1210 kHz to 1240 kHz on March 29, 1941. On that day, 795 US radio stations changed frequency as the result of the North American Regional Broadcasting Agreement (NARBA), signed in Havana with representatives from the U.S., Canada, Mexico, Cuba, Haiti and the Dominican Republic.

In 1948, WKOK added an FM sister station, WKOK-FM, originally at 100.3 MHz. WKOK-AM-FM mostly simulcast their programming until the late 1960s. Today, that station is WQKX at 94.1 MHz.

=== Move to 1070 ===
On October 25, 1961, the FCC granted Sunbury Broadcasting a construction permit for the station to change the station's frequency to 1070 kHz. Along with the new dial position, the power would increase to 10,000 watts daytime, 1,000 watts nighttime using directional antennas with different patterns for both day and night ("DA-2"). The FCC granted a new license with these changes effective October 1, 1963.

The FCC subsequently granted permission on June 10, 1970, for the station to switch to a non-directional antenna during daytime hours while continuing to use a directional antenna at night ("DA-N"). The station's day and night powers were not changed. The FCC granted a new license with these facilities on November 10, 1970.
