= WBZD (disambiguation) =

WBZD refers to the following broadcasting stations in the United States:

- WBZD-FM, a radio station (FM 93.3 MHz) licensed to Muncy, Pennsylvania
- WNGZ (AM), a radio station (AM 1490 kHz) licensed to Watkins Glen, New York, which held the call sign WBZD in 1999
- WMJM (defunct), a radio station (FM 105.9 MHz) licensed to Bowling Green, Kentucky, which held the call sign WBZD from 1992 to 1993
- WKDZ-FM, a radio station (FM 106.5 MHz) licensed to Cadiz, Kentucky, which held the call sign WBZD from 1985 to 1991
