= Inflatable rubber dam =

Inflatable rubber dams are cylindrical rubber fabrics placed across channels, and streams and act as a weir or dam to raise the upstream water level when inflated. The membrane is a multi-layer fabric made of synthetic fibre (usually nylon) and rubberised on one or both sides. The fabric is flexible and yet exhibits good wear-resistance characteristics. A layer of stainless steel mesh or ceramic chips can be embedded in the surface layer to reduce or prevent vandal damage.

The inflatable flexible membrane dams (IFMD, rubber dams, tiger dam) were developed in the 1950s by Norman M. Imbertson of the Los Angeles Department of Water and Power and were originally called fabridams. They are installed in stream and river beds, generally being bolted into a concrete foundation. They are used to divert water for irrigation, temporarily raise existing dams, flood control, water retention for aquifer recharge, reduce or prevent salt water intrusion into fresh water areas, protect low-lying coastal areas from tidal flooding, enable fish passage past diversion works, by deflation, and for sewage retention/separation during flood events.

Inflatable dams can be filled with water, air or both. They typically span about 100 m, with dam heights usually less than 5 m. The membrane is usually deflated for large overflows, but it is common to have a small nappe over the inflated dam.

== Examples of inflatable rubber dams ==
=== Capay Diversion Dam ===
The Capay Diversion Dam across Cache Creek in Yolo County, California, was originally built as a concrete structure in 1914. In 1994, an inflatable rubber component was added to the original dam and was recognized as the "longest single bladder dam in the world" at that time.

The Capay Diversion Dam is located approximately two miles above the town of Capay on Cache Creek. This dam was built by the Yolo Water & Power Company and serves as the headworks for the canal system. Here, the water released from Clear Lake and Indian Valley Reservoir is diverted into the West Adams and the Winters canals, feeding the entire canal system. The dam belongs to the Yolo County Flood Control and Water Conservation District.

=== Ramspol Balgstuw ===
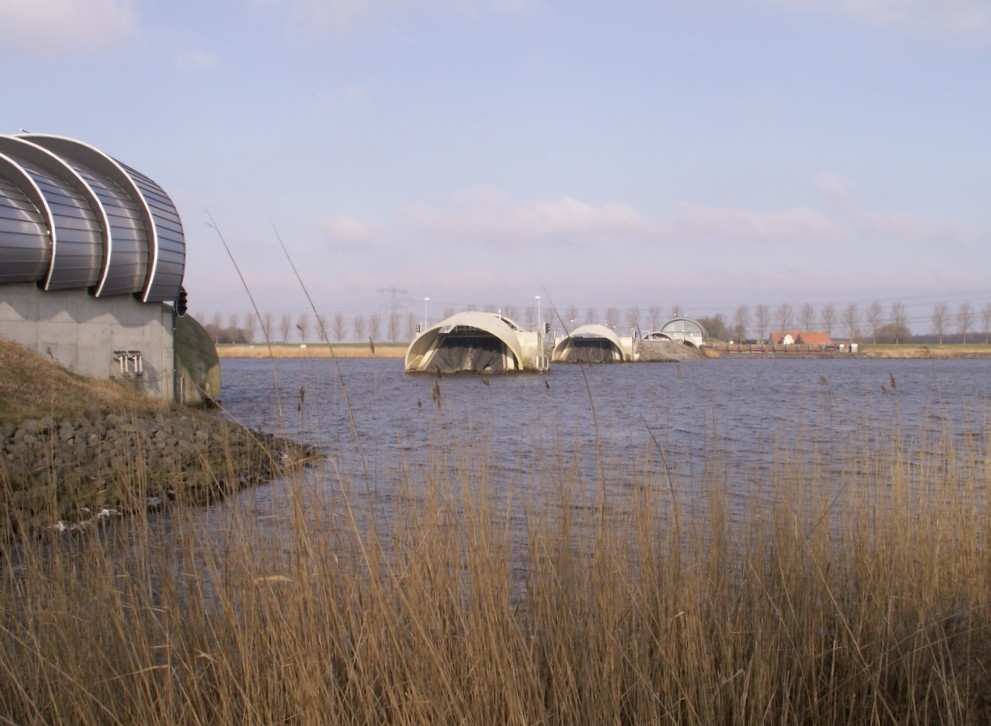
Balgstuw Ramspol rubber dam

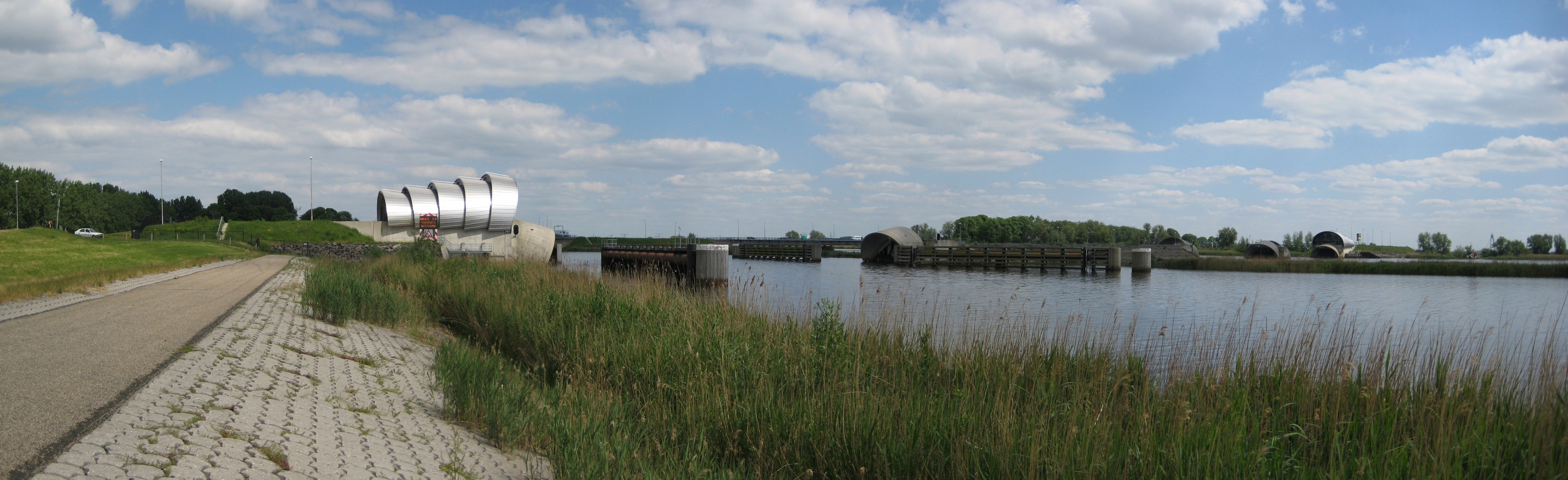
Panorama of the Balgstuw Ramspol

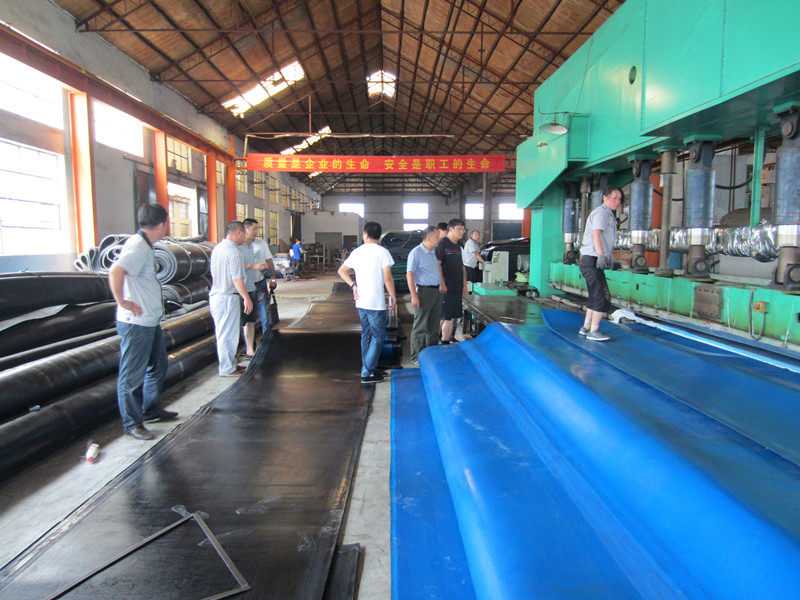
Rubber dam production

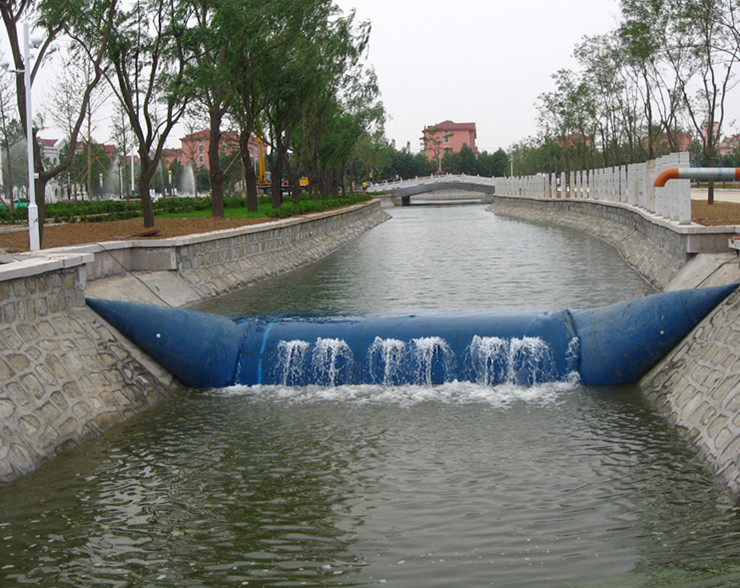
Example of a rubber dam

The balgstuw near Ramspol is a series of three inflatable rubber dams used for storm surge protection. It is situated between the Ketelmeer and the Zwarte Water in the Netherlands. The flexible rubber membranes of the 240 m span dam are inflated by air and water. The balgstuw is built to protect the villages against the rising water of the Ketelmeer.

=== Adam T. Bower Memorial Dam ===
The Adam T. Bower Memorial Dam (formerly known as the Sunbury Fabridam) was constructed in 1966 and was known as the world's longest inflatable dam, but has since been supplanted by the Xiaobudong rubber dam in China. The dam is located just below the confluence of the Western and Main Branches of the Susquehanna, between the towns of Shamokin Dam and Sunbury, Pennsylvania.

The dam is 2,100 feet (640 m) long and is made of seven dam bags. When it is raised in the summer time, it creates the 3,000 acre (12 km^{2}) Lake Augusta, which is used for recreation. The dam and lake are part of Shikellamy State Park.

== Sources ==
- Hubert Chanson (1996). Some Hydraulic Aspects during Overflow above Inflatable Flexible Membrane Dam, Report CH47/96, Dept. of Civil Engineering, University of Queensland, Australia, May, 60 pages (ISBN 0 86776 644 1).
- Hubert Chanson (1998). Hydraulics of Rubber Dam Overflow : a Simple Design Approach, Proc. 13th Australasian Fluid Mechanics Conference, Melbourne, Australia, 13–18 December, M.C. Thompson & K. Hourigan Ed., Vol. 1, pp. 255–258.
