= Rubber dam =

Rubber dam may refer to:

- Dental dam: dentistry and oral sex
- Inflatable rubber dam: civil engineering
