= WRVH =

WRVH may refer to:

- WRVH (FM), a radio station (89.3 FM) licensed to Clayton, New York which operates as an affiliate of WRVO Public Media
- WOTH, a radio station (107.9 FM) licensed to Williamsport, Pennsylvania, which held the call sign WRVH from 2002 to 2009
- WRNL, a radio station (910 AM) licensed to Richmond, Virginia, which held the call sign WRVH from 1993 to 1996
- WDBY, a radio station (105.5 FM) licensed to Patterson, New York, which held the call sign WRVH from 1981 to 1986
