= Adam T. Bower Memorial Dam =

Dam in Northumberland County, Pennsylvania, US

Coordinates: 40.8501°N 76.8075°W

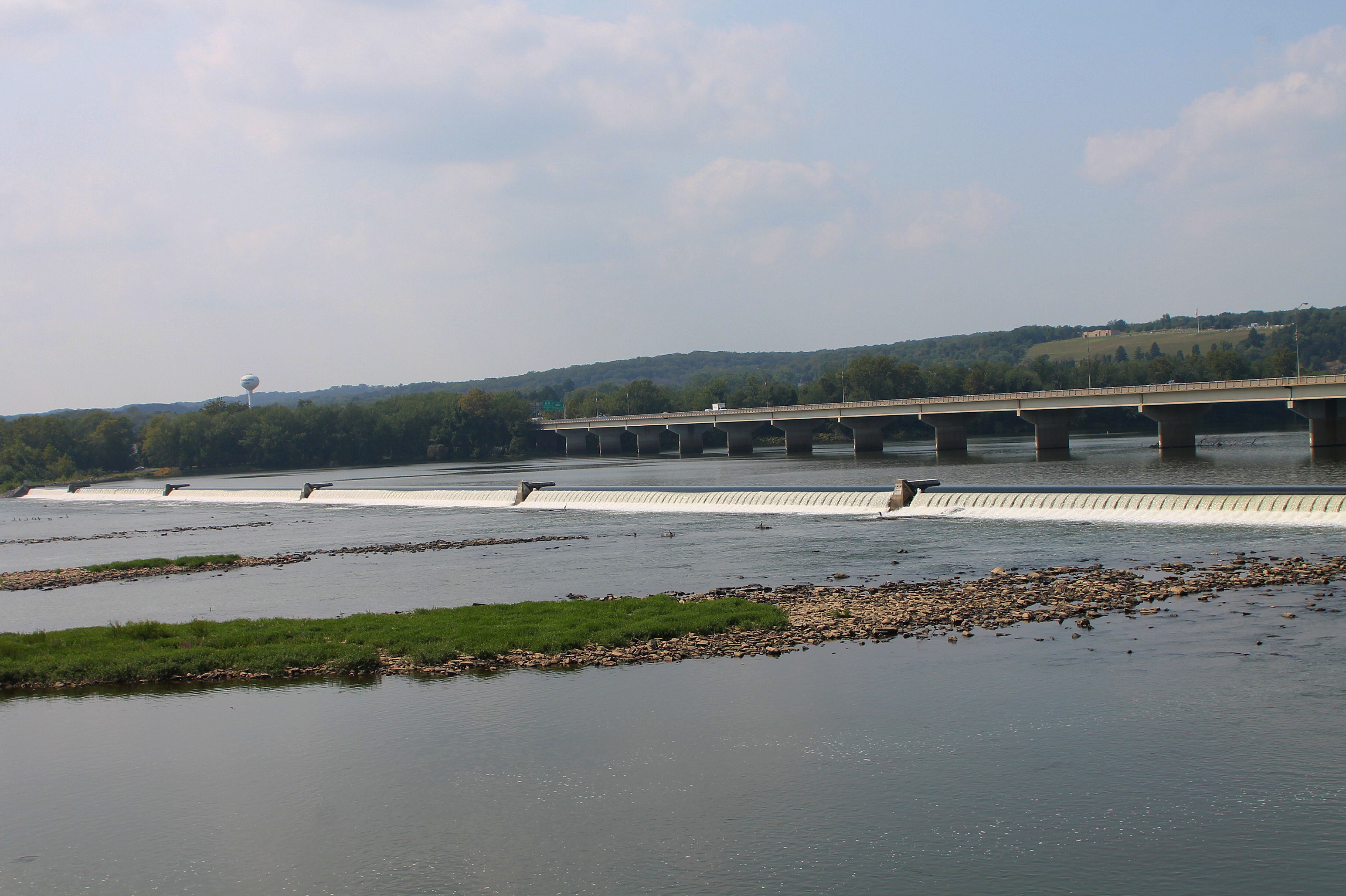
- Adam T. Bower Memorial Dam, with Pennsylvania Route 61 in the background
- Interactive map of Adam T. Bower Memorial Dam
- Country: United States of America
- Location: Upper Augusta Township, Northumberland County, Pennsylvania
- Purpose: Recreation
- Status: Operational
- Owner: Pennsylvania Department of Conservation and Natural Resources

Dam and spillways
- Impounds: Susquehanna River
- Height: 8 feet (2.4 m)
- Length: 2,563 feet (781 m)

Reservoir
- Creates: Lake Augusta
- Surface area: 3,000 acres (1,200 ha)

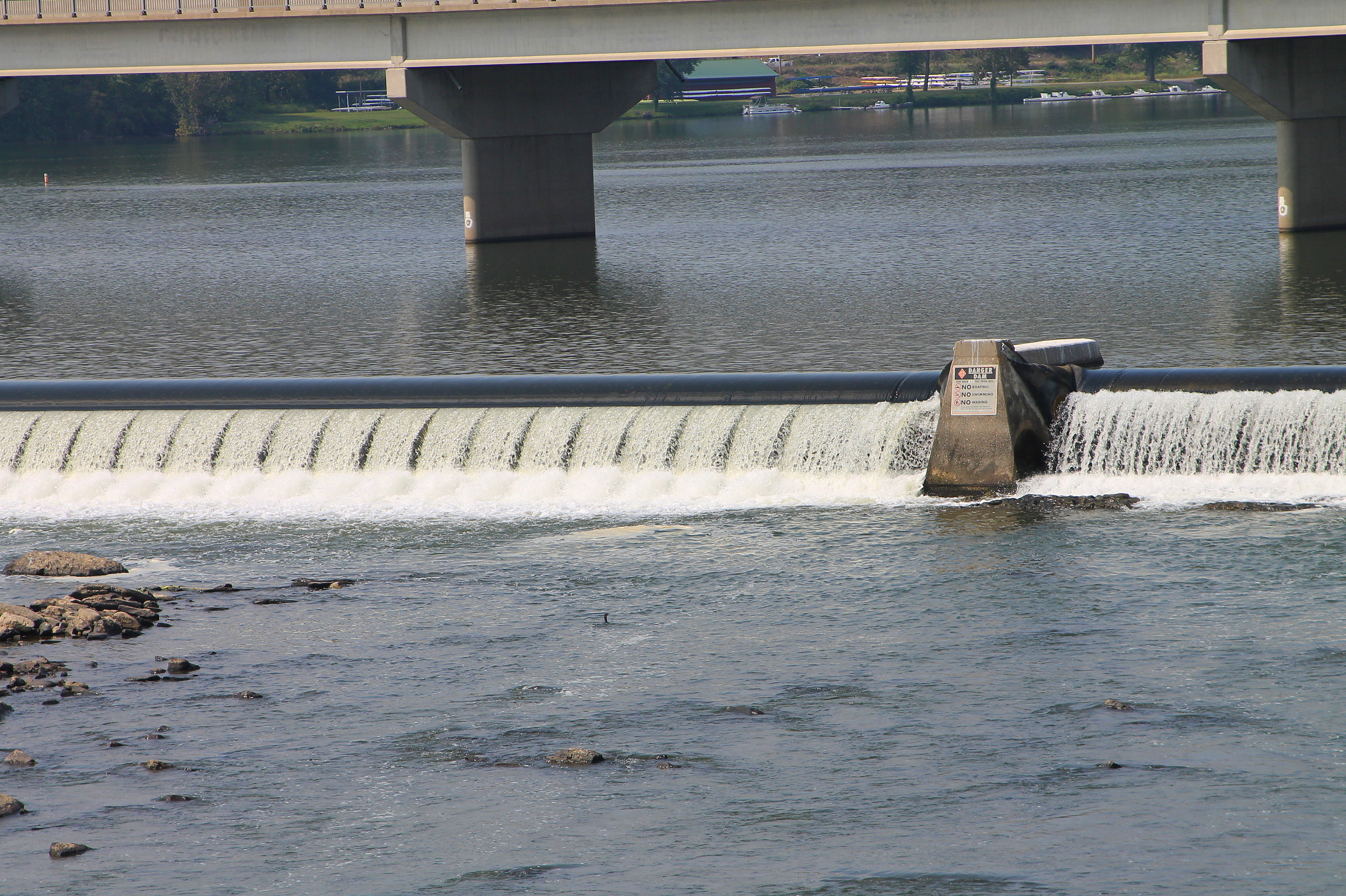
Detail of the Adam T. Bower Memorial Dam

The Adam T. Bower Memorial Dam (formerly known as the Sunbury Fabridam) is the world's longest inflatable dam. The dam is located just below the confluence of the Western and Main Branches of the Susquehanna River, in Upper Augusta Township, between the borough of Shamokin Dam and the city of Sunbury, Pennsylvania.

The dam is 2,100 feet (640 m) long. When it is raised in the summer time, it creates the 3,000 acre (12 km^{2}) Lake Augusta, which is used for recreation. The dam and lake are part of Shikellamy State Park.

In 2001, the dam was renamed for Adam T. Bower, Chief Clerk of the Pennsylvania House of Representatives from 1967–68 and Director of Services during the Pennsylvania Constitutional Convention of 1967-68, by Act 2001-5 of the Pennsylvania General Assembly.

There are plans underway to add a fish ladder to the dam. The fish ladder is primarily to allow the American shad to access the upper part of the Susquehanna. For the 2007 season the dam was slated to be deflated slowly over the period from August 20 through August 23. This earlier than usual lowering of the dam was to facilitate the replacement and repair of at least 3 of the synthetic bags which comprise the dam.

== Shamokin Dam ==
On this site there was the earlier Shamokin Dam. This dam maintained an adequate water level for ferry traffic across the Susquehanna from Shamokin (now Sunbury) to the west bank. It was destroyed in March, 1904 by the breakup of 22 inches (56 cm) of ice in the spring thaw. This is the dam for which the west bank town of Shamokin Dam was named.

There is another, existing, low head dam 1.2 miles (1.9 km) down stream, for the Shamokin Dam Power Plant.
