= WWPA =

Coordinates: 41°13′45″N 77°00′45″W

- Williamsport, Pennsylvania; United States
- Frequency: 1340 kHz

Programming
- Format: Conservative talk radio
- Affiliations: Salem Radio Network; Townhall News; Westwood One

Ownership
- Owner: Van A. Michael; (Backyard Broadcasting of Pennsylvania LLC)
- Sister stations: WBZD-FM, WCXR, WILQ, WOTH, WZXR

History
- First air date: 1949
- Call sign meaning: Williamsport, Pennsylvania

Technical information
- Licensing authority: FCC
- Facility ID: 58315
- Class: C
- Power: 1,000 watts unlimited
- Translator: 101.7 W269DX (Williamsport)
- Repeaters: 1380 WMLP (Milton); 105.1 WILQ-HD3 (Williamsport)

Links
- Public license information: Public file; LMS
- Webcast: Listen Live
- Website: twinvalleystalk.com

WWPA (1340 AM) is a conservative talk radio station licensed to serve the community of Williamsport, Pennsylvania, United States.

== History ==
On May 1, 2017, WWPA changed its format from adult standards to a sports format affiliated with ESPN Radio. In late 2021, WWPA dropped its ESPN sports format and flipped to an all-talk format as part of the Twin Valley's Talk Network.
