= WILQ =

Radio station in Williamsport, Pennsylvania, broadcasting country music

- Williamsport, Pennsylvania; United States
- Broadcast area: Central Pennsylvania
- Frequency: 105.1 MHz (HD Radio)

Programming
- Format: FM/HD1: Country music
- Subchannels: HD2: Family Life Network; HD3: WWPA simulcast
- Affiliations: Compass Media Networks; United Stations Radio Networks; Motor Racing Network

Ownership
- Owner: Van Michael; (Backyard Broadcasting of Pennsylvania LLC)
- Sister stations: WBZD-FM, WCXR, WOTH, WWPA, WZXR

History
- Former call signs: WLYC-FM (1947–1972); WILQ-FM (1972–1977)

Technical information
- Licensing authority: FCC
- Facility ID: 52192
- Class: B
- ERP: 9,200 watts (analog); 638 watts (digital)
- HAAT: 346 meters (1,135 ft)
- Transmitter coordinates: 41°11′43.2″N 76°58′16.8″W
- Translator: See § Translators

Links
- Public license information: Public file; LMS
- Webcast: Listen Live
- Website: www.wilq.com

WILQ (105.1 FM) is a commercial radio station licensed to serve Williamsport, Pennsylvania. The station is owned by Van Michael, through licensee Backyard Broadcasting of Pennsylvania LLC, and broadcasts a country music format. The station is an affiliate of Compass Media Networks, United Stations Radio Networks, and Motor Racing Network.

WILQ uses HD Radio, and broadcasts Family Life Network christian radio programming on its HD2 subchannel, which is simulcast on four FM translators. In addition, WILQ utilizes HD Radio, and broadcasts Twin Valley's Talk Network Talk radio programming on its HD3 subchannel, which is simulcast on WWPA and WMLP, and three FM translators.

== History ==
The Federal Communications Commission granted Lycoming County Broadcasting Company a construction permit for the station on April 29, 1947 with the WLYC-FM call sign. The station was granted its first license on August 18, 1950.

== Translators ==
The following four translators are licensed to Family Life Ministries, Inc., and simulcast Family Life Network programming broadcast on WILQ-HD2:

Call sign	Frequency	City of license	FID	ERP (W)	HAAT	Class	Transmitter coordinates	FCC info
W255BL	98.9 FM	Bloomsburg, Pennsylvania	154675	240	222 m (728 ft)	D	40°59′16.1″N 76°32′49.5″W	LMS
W272DV	102.3 FM	Lock Haven, Pennsylvania	94016	250	217 m (712 ft)	D	41°07′12.1″N 77°24′24.9″W	LMS
W277BJ	103.3 FM	Williamsport, Pennsylvania	156045	250	411 m (1,348 ft)	D	41°12′32.0″N 76°57′30.0″W	LMS
W284BG	104.7 FM	Lewisburg, Pennsylvania	150750	250	284 m (932 ft)	D	40°56′32.3″N 76°49′3.9″W	LMS
