= WQKX =

- Elizabethville, Pennsylvania; United States
- Broadcast area: Sunbury-Selinsgrove-Lewisburg, PA
- Frequency: 94.1 MHz (HD Radio)
- Branding: 94KX

Programming
- Format: Adult hits

Ownership
- Owner: Sunbury Broadcasting Corporation
- Sister stations: WEGH; WKOK

History
- First air date: 1948
- Former call signs: WKOK-FM (1945–1978)
- Former frequencies: 100.3 MHz (1945); 99.3 MHz (1945–1947)

Technical information
- Licensing authority: FCC
- Facility ID: 63890
- Class: B
- ERP: 16,000 watts (analog); 1,600 watts (digital)
- HAAT: 268 meters (879 ft)
- Transmitter coordinates: 40°47′10.3″N 76°41′47.9″W

Links
- Public license information: Public file; LMS
- Webcast: Listen live
- Website: www.wqkx.com

WQKX (94.1 FM, "94KX") is a commercial radio station licensed to serve Elizabethville, Pennsylvania. The station is owned by Sunbury Broadcasting Corporation and broadcasts an adult hits format. Its broadcast tower is located near Trevorton.

== History ==
The Federal Communications Commission (FCC) granted Sunbury Broadcasting Corporation a construction permit for the station on September 14, 1945 with the WKOK-FM call sign. Originally assigned to 100.3 MHz, the FCC reassigned the station to 99.3 MHz on November 11, 1945, followed by another reassignment to 94.1 MHz on June 27, 1947.

The station signed on for the first time in 1948. The FCC granted the station its first license on February 17, 1949. Until 1975, the station simulcast the programming of WKOK (1070 AM). In 1978, the call sign was changed to WQKX.

== Signal note ==
WQKX is short-spaced to WIP-FM Sports Radio 94 WIP (licensed to serve Philadelphia, Pennsylvania) as they both operate on the same channel and the distance between the stations' transmitters is 93 miles (150 km) as determined by FCC rules. The minimum distance between two Class B stations operating on the same channel according to current FCC rules is 150 miles (240 km).
