= Beck House (Sunbury, Pennsylvania) =

Historic house in Pennsylvania, United States

- U.S. National Register of Historic Places
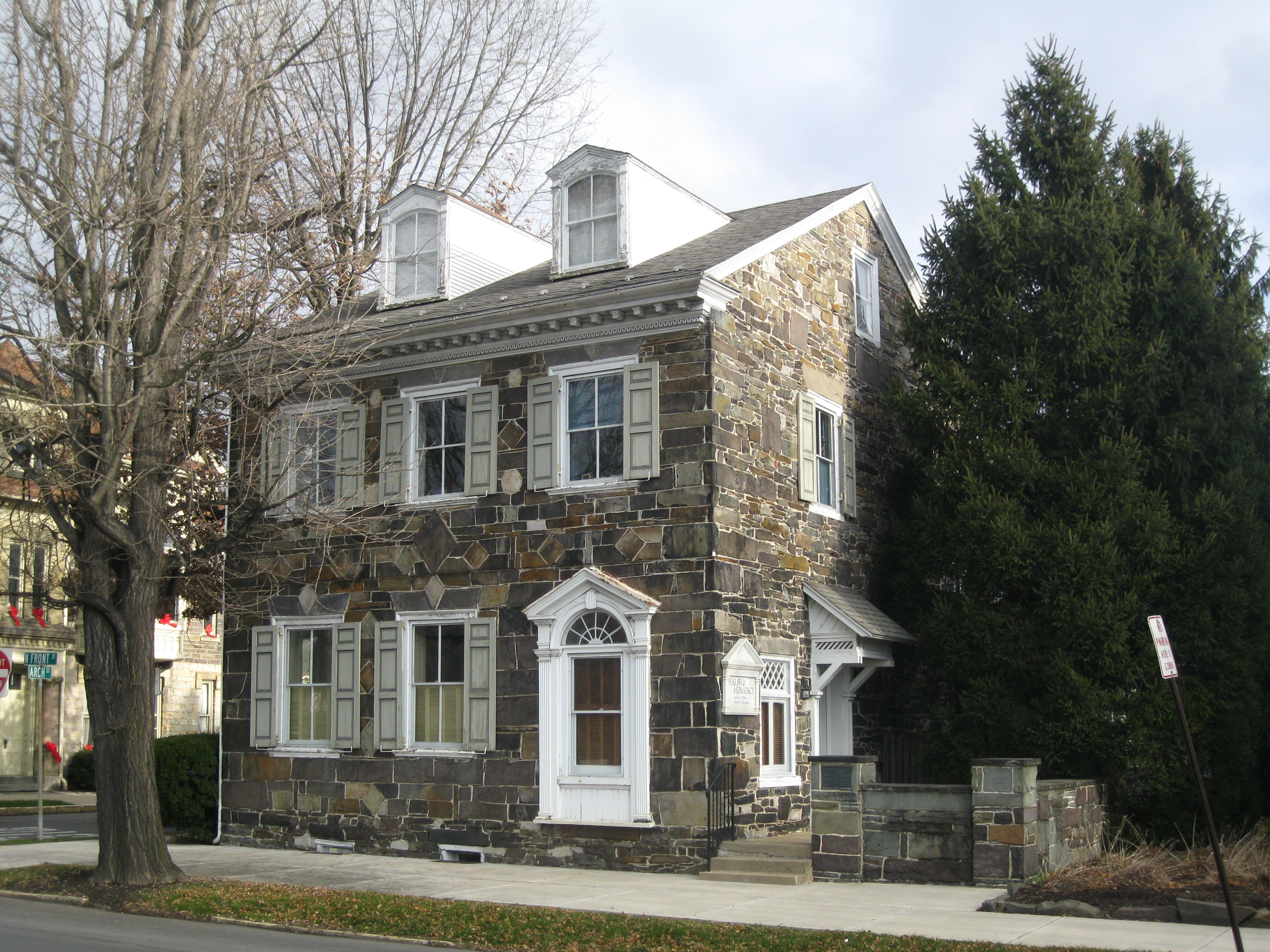
- The house in 2012

- Location within Pennsylvania Location within the United States
- Location: 62 N. Front St., Sunbury, Pennsylvania
- Coordinates: 40°51′50″N 76°47′46″W
- Area: 1 acre (0.40 ha)
- Built: c. 1785, 1796
- Built by: Doudel, Jacob
- NRHP reference No.: 76001659
- Added to NRHP: January 11, 1976

The Beck House, also known as the Old Scott House, is a historic home located at Sunbury, Northumberland County, Pennsylvania. It was included by the Pennsylvania Historical and Museum Commission in its Inventory of Historical Places in April 1975, and was added to the National Register of Historic Places in 1976.

== History ==
The Beck House was built in two sections; one about 1785 and the front section in 1796. The original section is a two bay by two bay structure constructed of rough fieldstone. The original section features large corner quoins. The front section is stone structure, two stories high and three bays wide. The front section features stones of geometric shapes, such as rectangles, diamonds, and circles, inlaid as part of the stonework.

It was added to the Inventory of Historical Places by the Pennsylvania Historical and Museum Commission in April 1975, and was then also added to the National Register of Historic Places in 1976.
