= WCXR =

Simulcasts WZXR, Williamsport, Pennsylvania
- Lewisburg, Pennsylvania; United States
- Broadcast area: Sunbury-Selinsgrove-Lewisburg, PA
- Frequency: 103.7 MHz
- Branding: 99.3 & 103.7 WZXR

Programming
- Format: Mainstream rock
- Affiliations: United Stations Radio Networks; Westwood One

Ownership
- Owner: Van A. Michael; (Backyard Broadcasting of Pennsylvania LLC)
- Sister stations: WBZD-FM; WILQ; WOTH; WWPA; WZXR

History
- First air date: 1990
- Former call signs: WYBA (1990); WUNS (1990–1995)

Technical information
- Licensing authority: FCC
- Facility ID: 15187
- Class: A
- ERP: 950 watts
- HAAT: 244 meters
- Transmitter coordinates: 40°58′38.2″N 77°6′58.8″W

Links
- Public license information: Public file; LMS
- Webcast: Listen live
- Website: www.wzxr.com

WCXR (103.7 FM) is a radio station licensed to Lewisburg, Pennsylvania, owned by Van A. Michael through licensee Backyard Broadcasting of Pennsylvania LLC. WCXR is a simulcast of 99.3 FM WZXR in Williamsport, Pennsylvania.

== See also ==
- WZXR
