= WZXR =

- South Williamsport, Pennsylvania; United States
- Broadcast area: Williamsport, Pennsylvania
- Frequency: 99.3 MHz
- Branding: 99.3 & 103.7 WZXR

Programming
- Format: Mainstream rock
- Affiliations: United Stations Radio Networks; Westwood One

Ownership
- Owner: Van A. Michael; (Backyard Broadcasting of Pennsylvania LLC)
- Sister stations: WBZD-FM; WCXR; WILQ; WOTH; WWPA

History
- First air date: 1991
- Former call signs: WMPT-FM (1981–1983); WFXX-FM (1983–1991)

Technical information
- Licensing authority: FCC
- Facility ID: 61180
- Class: A
- ERP: 410 watts
- HAAT: 377 meters
- Transmitter coordinates: 41°13′5.0″N 76°57′26.0″W
- Repeater: 103.7 WCXR (Lewisburg)

Links
- Public license information: Public file; LMS
- Webcast: Listen live
- Website: www.wzxr.com

WZXR (99.3 FM) is a mainstream rock formatted radio station licensed to serve Williamsport, Pennsylvania. The station bills itself as "Susquehanna Valley's Home of Rock and Roll", and is owned by Van A. Michael, through licensee Backyard Broadcasting of Pennsylvania LLC.

== See also ==
- WCXR
