= WVLY-FM =

Radio station in Milton, Pennsylvania

- Milton, Pennsylvania; United States
- Broadcast area: Sunbury–Selinsgrove–Lewisburg, Pennsylvania
- Frequency: 100.9 MHz

Programming
- Format: Contemporary Christian
- Affiliations: K-Love

Ownership
- Owner: Educational Media Foundation; (K-Love, Inc.)
- Sister stations: WKBP

History
- First air date: January 11, 1968
- Former call signs: WMLP-FM (1967–1979); WOEZ-FM (1979–1994); WVLY (1994–2001)

Technical information
- Licensing authority: FCC
- Facility ID: 73272
- Class: A
- ERP: 1,300 watts
- HAAT: 218 meters (715 ft)
- Transmitter coordinates: 40°57′12.3″N 76°45′3.9″W

Links
- Public license information: Public file; LMS
- Website: www.klove.com

WVLY-FM (100.9 FM) is a radio station licensed to Milton, Pennsylvania, United States, serving East Central Pennsylvania. The station is owned by the Educational Media Foundation and broadcasts the K-Love network. The station's maintains studios on County Line Road in Selinsgrove and its transmitter is located on Tower Road in Danville.

== History ==
The Federal Communications Commission granted WMLP, Inc. a construction permit for a new FM station on July 5, 1967. It was the sister station to WMLP (1380 AM). The station's call sign was WMLP-FM. The construction was completed and the license was granted on January 11, 1968. In its early years, it mostly simulcast the programming on WMLP 1380 AM. It later had an automated country music format.

The FM station's call sign was changed to WOEZ-FM on October 1, 1979. It began broadcasting an easy listening format. Then on September 23, 1994, the call sign was changed to WVLY, followed by a change to WVLY-FM on January 22, 2001.

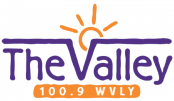
Former logo until 2026

Sunbury Broadcasting Corporation purchased the assets of WVLY-FM from Milton/Lewisburg Broadcasting Corporation on March 6, 2006.

In April 2025, Sunbury announced the sale of WVLY-FM to Michael Radio Company for $410,000, breaking up the local radio cluster. The sale was completed on July 25.

On July 23, 2025, it was announced that WVLY would be became an online-only radio station effective July 25, silencing the main on-air radio station.

In August 2025, Michael Radio Company sold WVLY to the Educational Media Foundation for $200,000; the sale was completed on December 12, 2025. Afterwards, the station returned on-air in September.
