= WBZD-FM =

Coordinates: 41.212°N 76.954°W

- Muncy, Pennsylvania; United States
- Broadcast area: Williamsport, Pennsylvania
- Frequency: 93.3 MHz
- Branding: 93.3 WBZD

Programming
- Format: Classic hits
- Affiliations: United Stations Radio Networks

Ownership
- Owner: Van A. Michael; (Backyard Broadcasting of Pennsylvania LLC)
- Sister stations: WCXR, WILQ, WOTH, WWPA, WZXR

History
- First air date: August 11, 1983

Technical information
- Licensing authority: FCC
- Facility ID: 72793
- Class: B1
- ERP: 1,400 watts
- HAAT: 390 meters (1,280 ft)
- Translator: (102.1 MHz) W271BP (Montoursville)

Links
- Public license information: Public file; LMS
- Webcast: Listen Live
- Website: wbzd.com

WBZD-FM (93.3 MHz) is a classic hits music formatted radio station licensed to Muncy, Pennsylvania, United States. The station is branded as "93.3 WBZD" and serves the Williamsport, Pennsylvania, area. It is owned by Van A. Michael, through licensee Backyard Broadcasting of Pennsylvania LLC.

93.3 WBZD on-air lineup:

- Mornings: Jake Michaels
- Mid-days: Keith Kitchen
- Afternoons: Kelly E.
- Evenings and overnights: board-oped
