= Northumberland County Courthouse =

- U.S. National Register of Historic Places
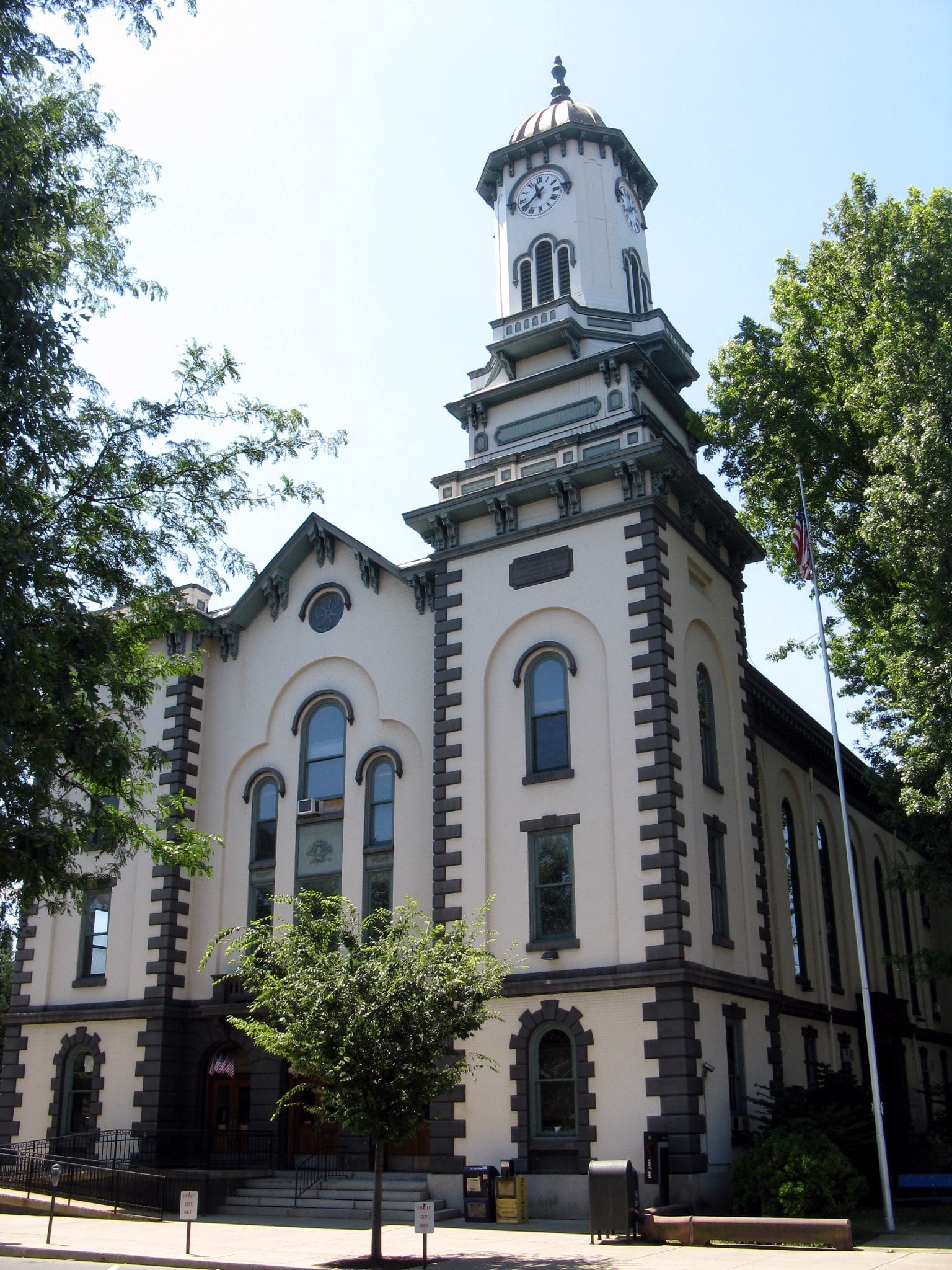
- Northumberland County Courthouse, July 2010

- Location within Pennsylvania Location within the United States
- Location: 207 Market St., Sunbury, Pennsylvania
- Coordinates: 40°51′42″N 76°47′43″W
- Area: 1 acre (0.40 ha)
- Built: 1865
- Architectural style: Italianate
- NRHP reference No.: 74001800
- Added to NRHP: December 30, 1974

The Northumberland County Courthouse is an historic county courthouse located in Sunbury, Northumberland County, Pennsylvania. Erected in 1865, it was added to the National Register of Historic Places in 1974.

== History and features ==
Built in 1865 by Samuel Sloan (architect), the Northumberland County Courthouse is a three-story, brick building that was designed in the Italianate style.

A three-story wing was added in 1911. It features three arched doors on the front facade, brownstone quoins at the corners, and a clock tower with a copper dome. The tower bell was donated by Simon Cameron.

In 1878, it was the site of the murder trial and conviction of the last Molly Maguire, Peter McManus.

== Gallery ==
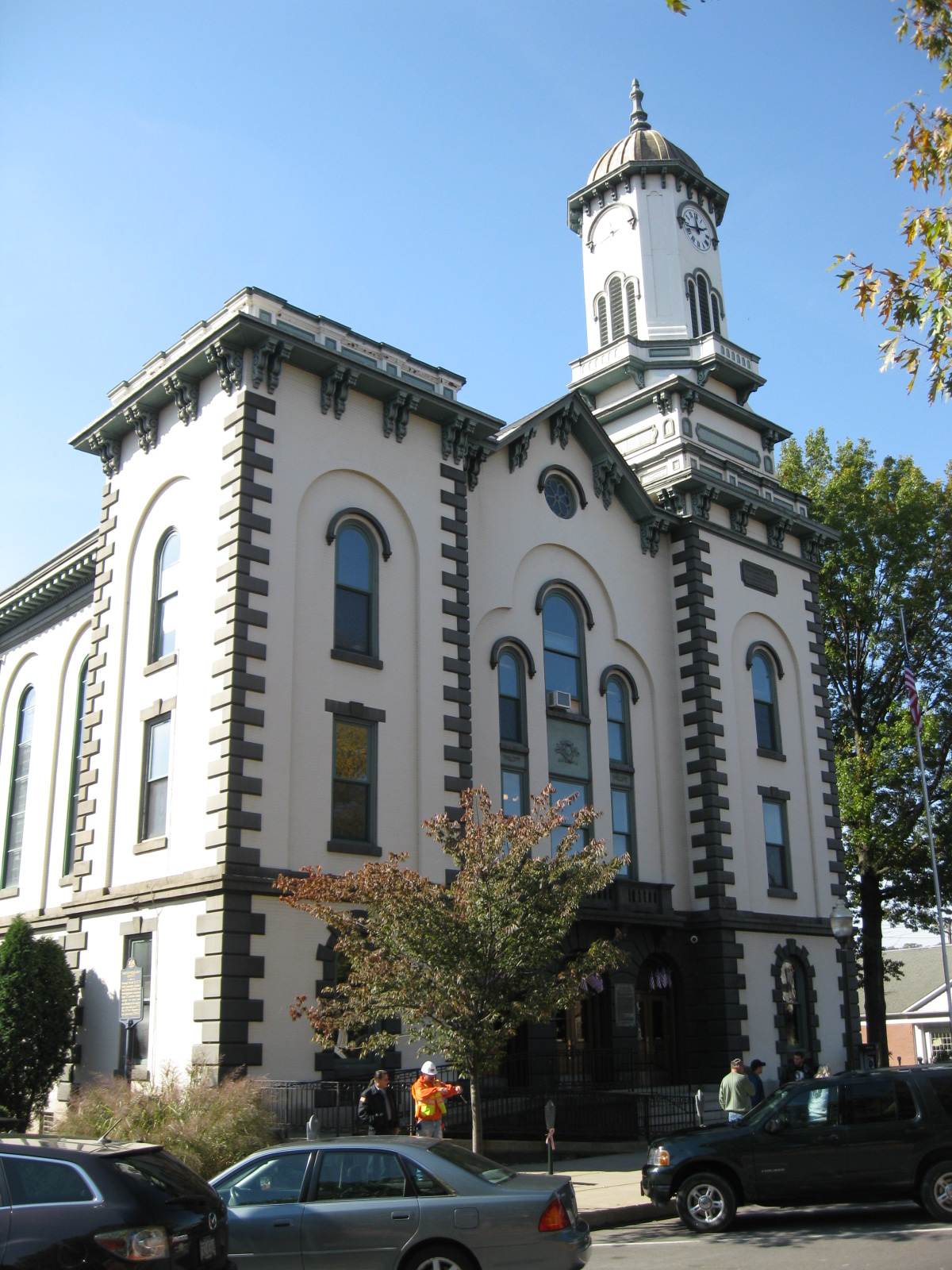
Northumberland County Courthouse, October 2009

== See also ==
- List of state and county courthouses in Pennsylvania
