= Edison Hotel (Sunbury, Pennsylvania) =

Sunbury, Pennsylvania building, built in 1871

Coordinates: 40.86107°N 76.79103°W

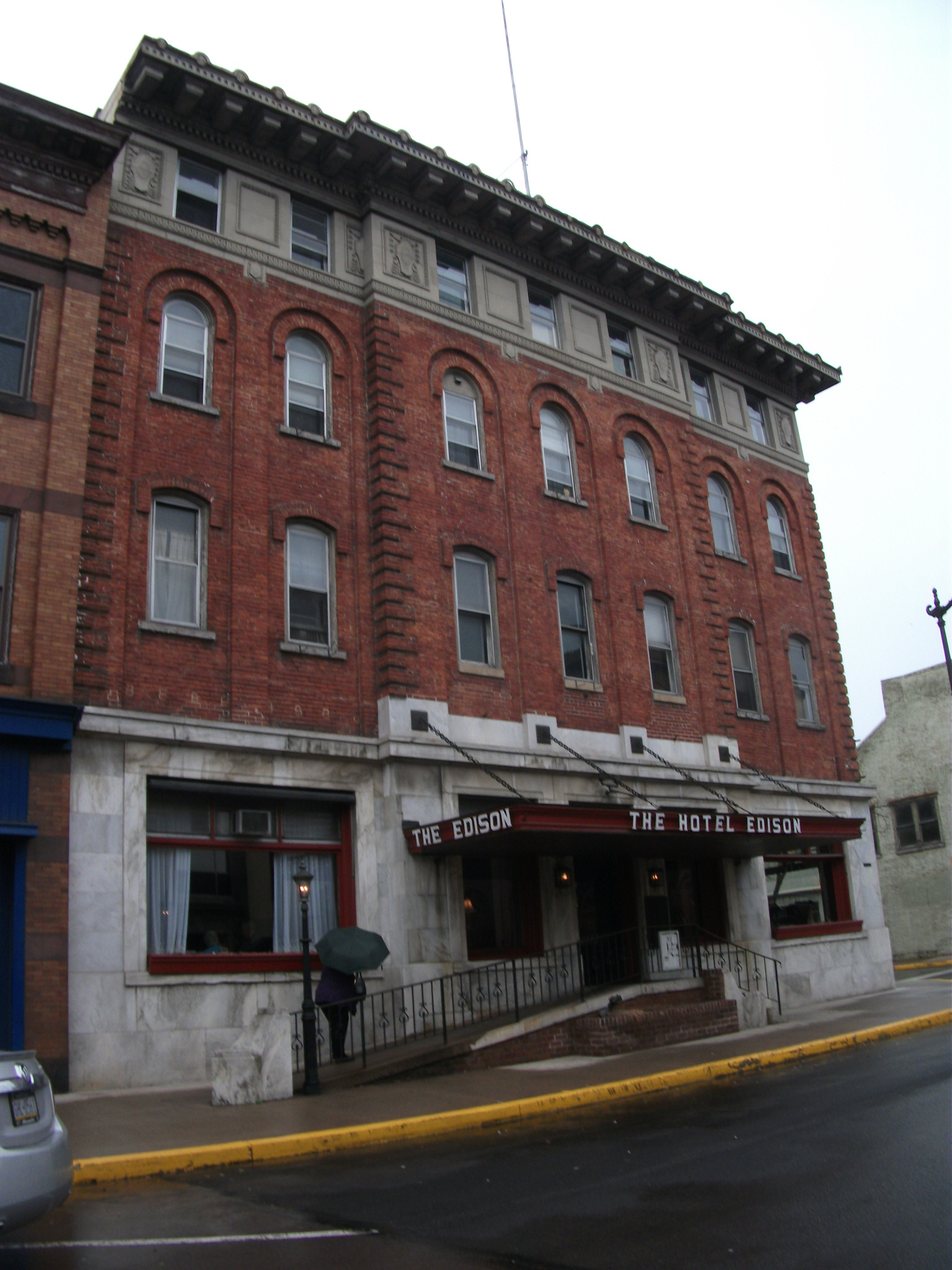
The Hotel Edison, Sunbury, Pennsylvania

The Hotel Edison in Sunbury, Pennsylvania was built in 1871 by entrepreneur Edward T. Drumheller and opened as the City Hotel in January 1872. It was the first building to be lit with Thomas Edison's three-wire system in July 1883.

Renamed the Hotel Edison in 1922 during Sunbury's 150th anniversary, it has fifty-one rooms and fifteen residential apartments, and is located on Fourth and Market Streets.

== History ==
Built in 1871, the City Hotel was known for its high quality lodging and fine dining, and also had one of the first commercial elevators in the United States hotel system. During this early phase of operations, the hotel had forty guest rooms on its second and third floors and offered two payment plans: a pay-by-the-day "American plan" and an extended-stay "European plan."

The hotel's carriage house, which was built as a separate structure around the same time as the City Hotel, was situated behind the hotel and operated as a 19th-century transit center, housing horses and carriages that transported passengers to and from the hotel and key points in the city, including Sunbury's wharf and Third Street railroad station. A fire tower constructed after World War II physically connected the carriage house to the hotel.

George Guyer was the proprietor of the hotel during the early 1880s.

It was the first building in Sunbury to be lit with Thomas Edison's three-wire system in July 1883. John W. Treadwell, Jr., a nine-year-old boy in the crowd of onlookers, was given the honor of throwing the switch that turned on Edison's new lighting system.

The hotel was also equipped with new water closets during the summer of 1884.

The City Hotel was renamed as the Hotel Edison in 1922, during the city's 150th anniversary celebration, which was attended by Edison.

As automobiles rose in popularity, the carriage house, which faces Court Street, was subsequently converted into office and retail space.

Charles E. Duffy, Jr. became the proprietor of The Hotel Edison in 1939. In February 1949, Duffy opened a new, twenty-six-room addition with a new fireproofing system for the building.

In 1963, Duffy hired Robert Weiser, contractor, to enlarge the hotel's bar and grille, and announced that that section of his hotel would be renamed as the Hobnail Bar while the cocktail lounge would keep its Pennsylvania Dutch decor. His son, Charles Duffy III, succeeded him as president of The Hotel Edison Corporation.

The younger Duffy then sold the hotel in September 1966 to the Para Corporation of Harrisburg which, in turn, sold it to the Gold Star Nursing Home Association of Milton, which managed it from January 3 to September 30, 1967, when it ceased operations. It was subsequently sold to Max Wagner, a commercial hotel-motel broker who owned the University Motor Inn in Lewisburg, Pennsylvania.
