= Shikellamy State Park =

State park in Pennsylvania, United States

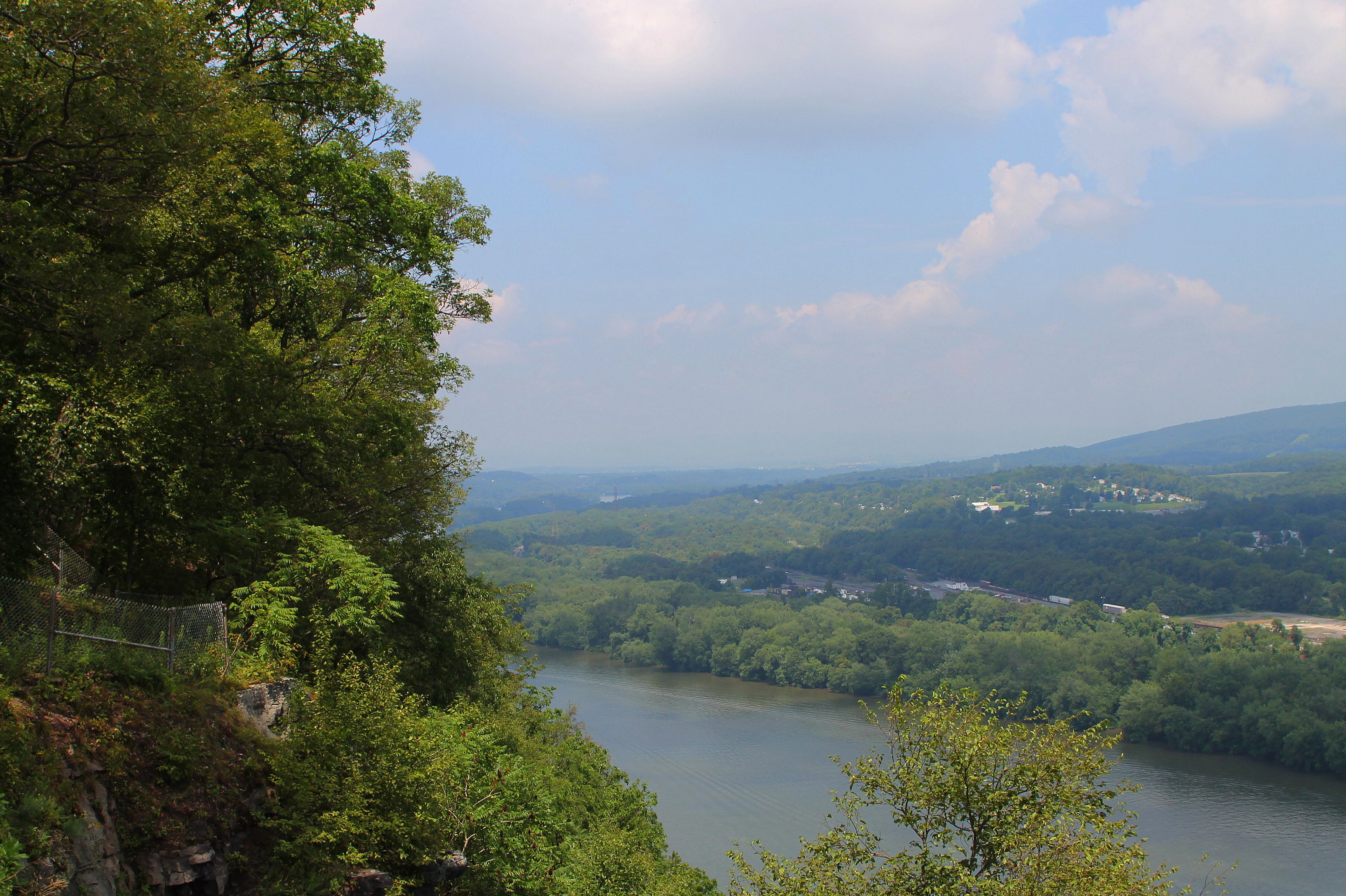
- View from scenic overlook

- Location within Pennsylvania Location within the United States
- Interactive map of Shikellamy State Park
- Location: Union and Northumberland counties, Pennsylvania, United States
- Coordinates: 40°52′45″N 76°48′14″W (Overlook)
- Area: 190 acres (77 ha) (Overlook); 50 acres (20 ha) (Marina)
- Elevation: 705 feet (215 m)
- Established: 1960
- Administrator: Pennsylvania Department of Conservation and Natural Resources
- Website: Official website
- Pennsylvania State Parks

Shikellamy State Park is a 240-acre (97 ha) Pennsylvania state park located at the confluence of the West Branch Susquehanna River and Susquehanna River in Pennsylvania. The park is divided into two sections. The older part, on a bluff on the western bank of the Susquehanna River, is the 78-acre (32 ha) Shikellamy overlook in Union Township, Union County. The newer part is the 54-acre (22 ha) marina on the southern end of Packer Island in Upper Augusta Township, Northumberland County. Packer's Island lies between the city of Sunbury and the borough of Northumberland at the confluence of the two branches of the river.

== History ==
Shikellamy State Park is named in honor of Shikellamy, an Iroquois chief. Chief Shikellamy played a major role in the history of the frontier in Pennsylvania. He was a friend of the Native Americans and the American Colonists of the 18th century. Shikellamy's village was located near where the overlook section of the park is today.

Shikellamy State Park was opened in two phases. The overlook was opened for visitors in 1960; the marina for boaters opened 12 years later, in 1972.

== Adam T. Bower Memorial Dam ==
The Adam T. Bower Memorial Dam (also the Sunbury Fabridam or Fabri Dam) is the world's longest inflatable dam and it impounds the Susquehanna River. The dam is located just below the confluence of the West and North Branches of the Susquehanna, between the towns of Shamokin Dam and Sunbury.

The dam is 2,100 feet (640 m) long. When it is raised in the summer, it creates the 3,000-acre (1,200 ha) Lake Augusta, which is used for recreation. The dam and lake are part of Shikellamy State Park.

The dam was named for Adam T. Bower, Chief Clerk of the Pennsylvania House of Representatives from 1967–68 and Director of Services during the Pennsylvania Constitutional Convention of 1967-68, by Act 2001-5 of the Pennsylvania General Assembly.

There are plans underway to add a fish ladder to the dam. The fish ladder is primarily to allow the American shad to access the upper part of the Susquehanna.

=== Shamokin Dam ===
On this site there was the earlier Shamokin Dam. This dam maintained an adequate water level for ferry traffic across the Susquehanna from Shamokin (now Sunbury) to the west bank. It was destroyed in March, 1904 by the breakup of 22 inches (56 cm) (56 cm) of ice in the spring thaw. This is the dam that the west bank town of Shamokin Dam is named after.

There is another, existing, low head dam 1.2 miles (1.9 km) down stream, for the Shamokin Dam Power Plant

== Recreation ==
=== Scenic views ===
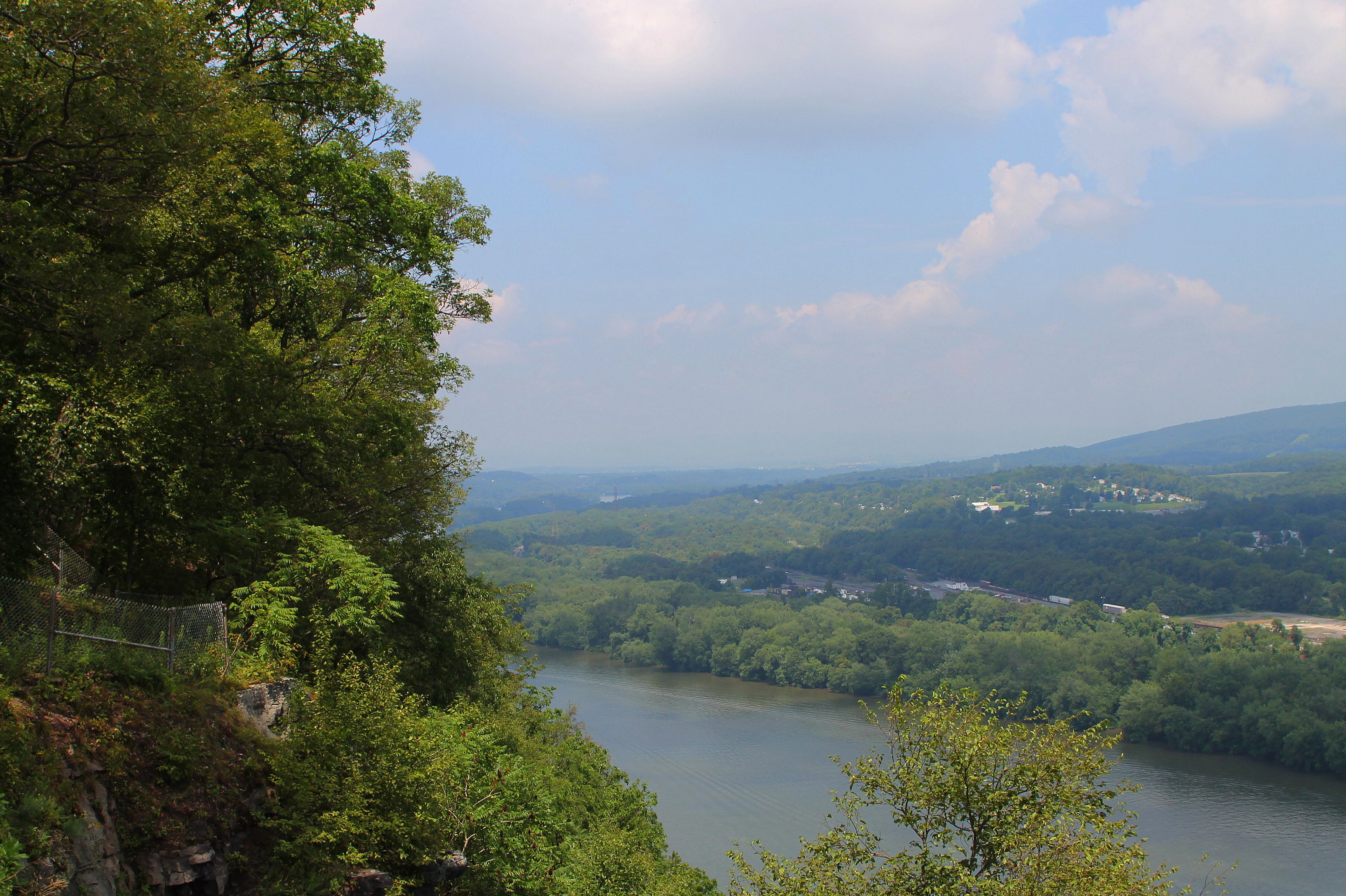
View looking northeast from the Shikellamy State Park overlook

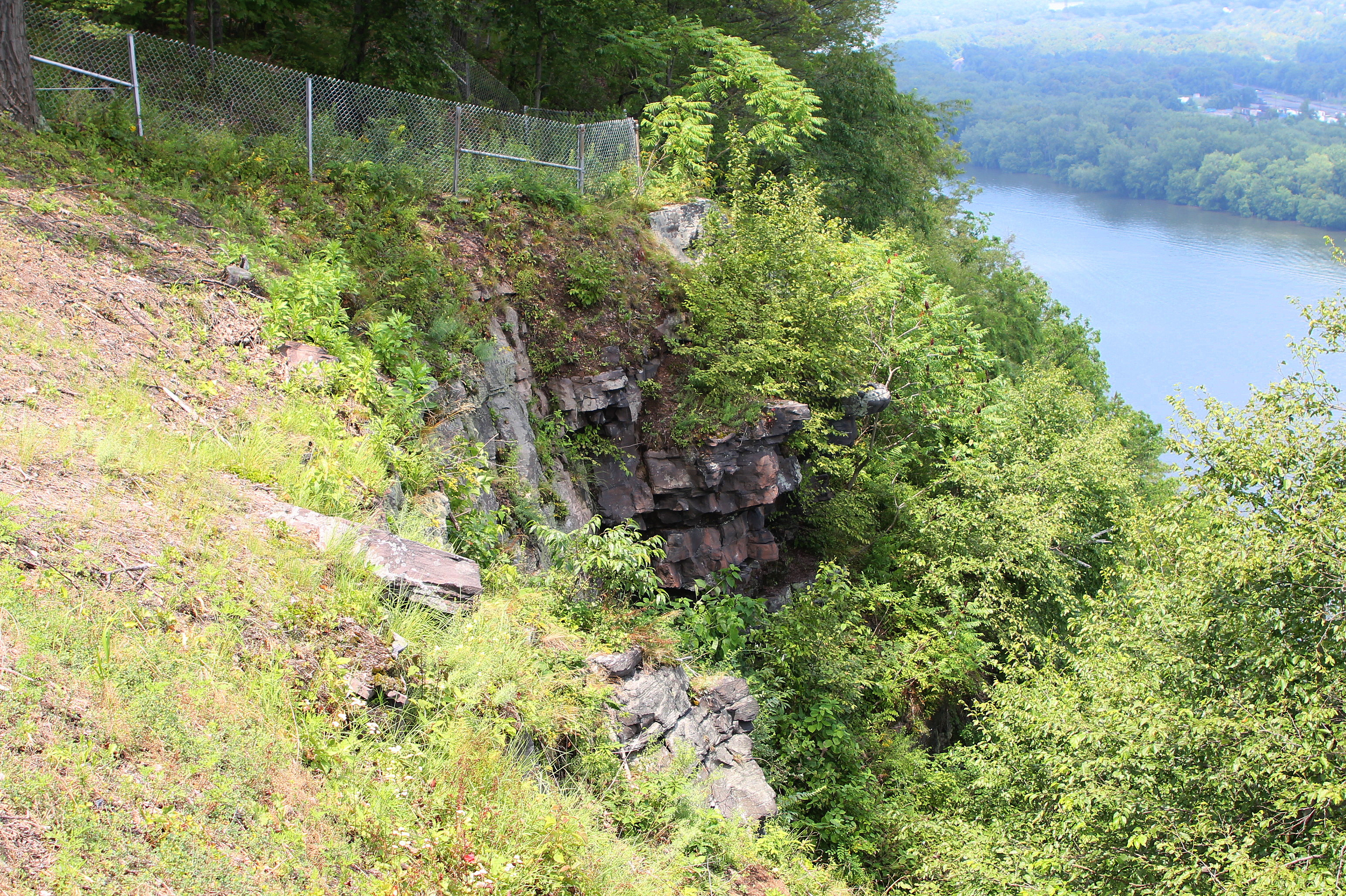
Shikellamy State Park cliff

The Overlook has been an important prominent feature of the Susquehanna valley for centuries. Before Moravian settlers inhabited the valley in the 18th century, the Penns creek path began and ended where county line road now sits, an important logistics route for the Native Americans in the area. The path ran from Frankstown, through New Berlin, and eventually to Northumberland. In the 1840s, the cliff was home to John Mason, an eccentric bachelor who constructed a viewing tower that hung at a 45-degree angle of the precipice. The tower was destroyed in 1864. In 1894, a beautiful hotel was constructed where the current pavilion is now, and that hotel burnt to the ground in 1898. In the early 20th century, the cliff was frequented by locals for picnics and leisure, often at what was called table rock. Wealthy mineral miners attempted an excavation of the cliff, in hopes of discovering valuable minerals, but were unsuccessful, leading to a small cut out which gives the appearance of a cave, however, there are no caves anywhere in the cliff. Over the years, scout camps and rehabilitation camps were set up on the land, and in 1960 the state opened a public state park on the land. Shikellamy Overlook offers two scenic overlooks. They are 360 feet (110 m) above the confluence of the West Branch Susquehanna River and North Branch Susquehanna River. One can get a view of the northern and western rivers as well as a bird's-eye view of Northumberland, Sunbury, and Hummels Wharf. A breeding pair of state-endangered peregrine falcons have established a successful nest on the cliffs below the scenic overlook. It is only the third known "wild nest" built by the birds in the state. Most other breeding pairs have been introduced to sites throughout the state by the Pennsylvania Game Commission.

=== Hiking ===
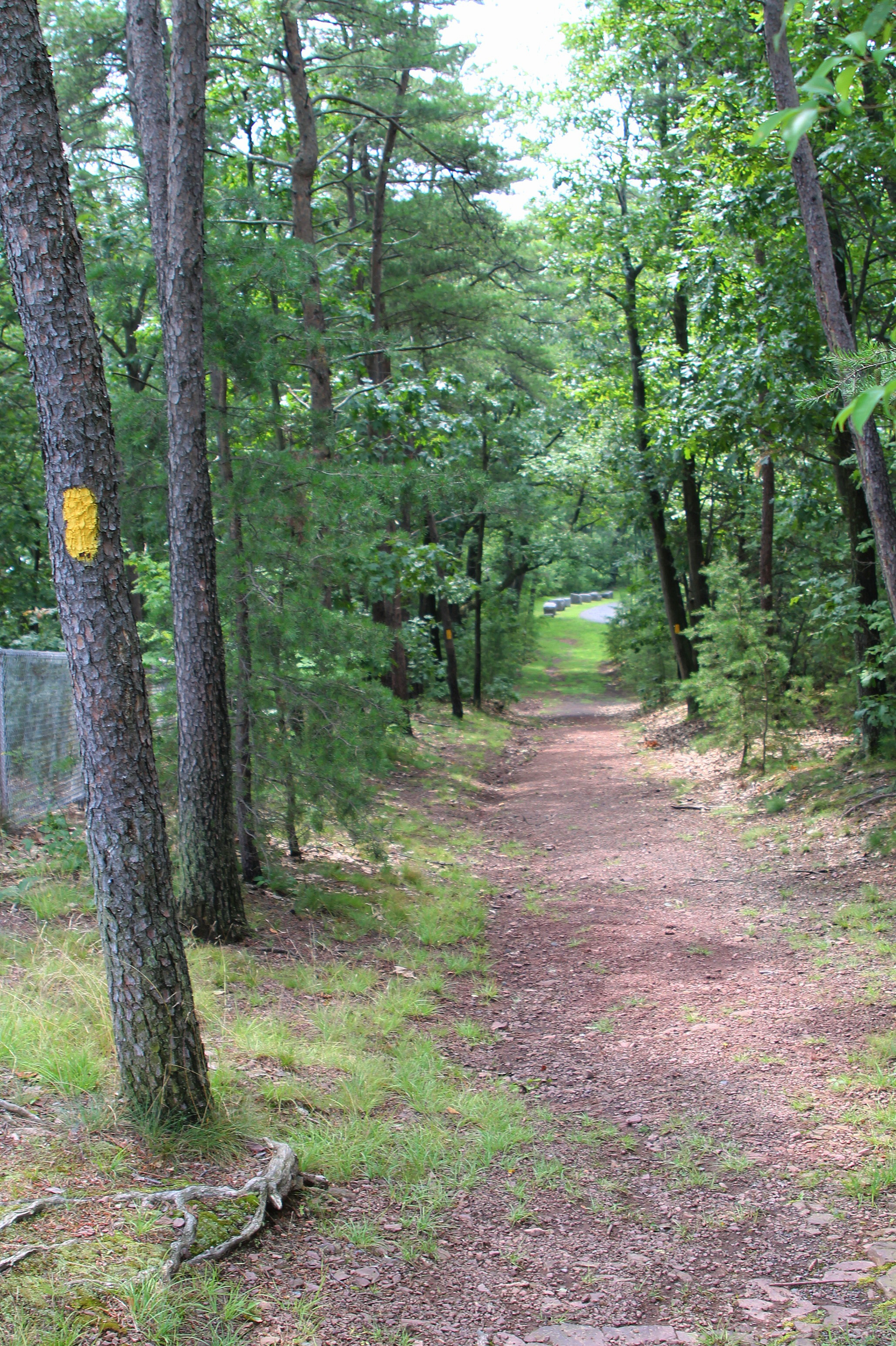
Deer Trail in Shikellamy State Park

Both sections of Shikellamy State Park have a hiking trail. At the overlook there is a one-mile (1.6 km) nature trail. Careful hikers will get the chance to observe some wildlife. They might see white-tail deer, many different songbirds and a wide variety of wildflowers. Hikers can also observe the development of forests at the overlook. The forest changes from scrub forest to mature hardwood forest. The marina is encircled by paved walking paths for those interested in taking a walk along the river and marina.

=== Rowing ===
In the early-to-mid-19th century, the construction of a dam across the Susquehanna River, just south of the city of Sunbury, produced a lake known as Lake Augusta. In 1874 a group of rowers (log raftmen and shad fishermen) from Shamokin Dam and Sunbury competed in a regatta on Lake Augusta, rowing in both singles and doubles. The rowers from Shamokin Dam were victorious that day, winning a barrel of flour, gold sleeve buttons and a silver cup, while the rowers from Sunbury vowed to win in the next year. The most popular event of the day was a "tub" race in which the same rowers sat in wash tubs and paddled over a shorter course.

The sport of rowing became a popular sport in central Pennsylvania, and in 1888 a National Association of Amateur Oarsmen Championship was held on the Lake Augusta. Rowers traveled from as far away as Canada and the Midwest to compete, and reportedly, thousands of spectators lined the banks of the river. The number of spectators was so great, the railroad companies rerouted trains to accommodate the throngs of people.

Rowing in Central Pennsylvania was popular until an ice surge in 1904 demolished the dam that made conditions ideal for the sport. In 1968, a new inflatable dam was installed that allowed rowing to slowly return. By the early 1980s Bucknell University had established a crew team, and by the early 1990s Susquehanna University had its own team. Near the end of the last century, a masters rowing club, the Central Pennsylvania Rowing Association, was founded. The college teams and masters club now share a boat house on Lake Augusta near the junction of Routes 11 and 15, just north of Shamokin Dam.

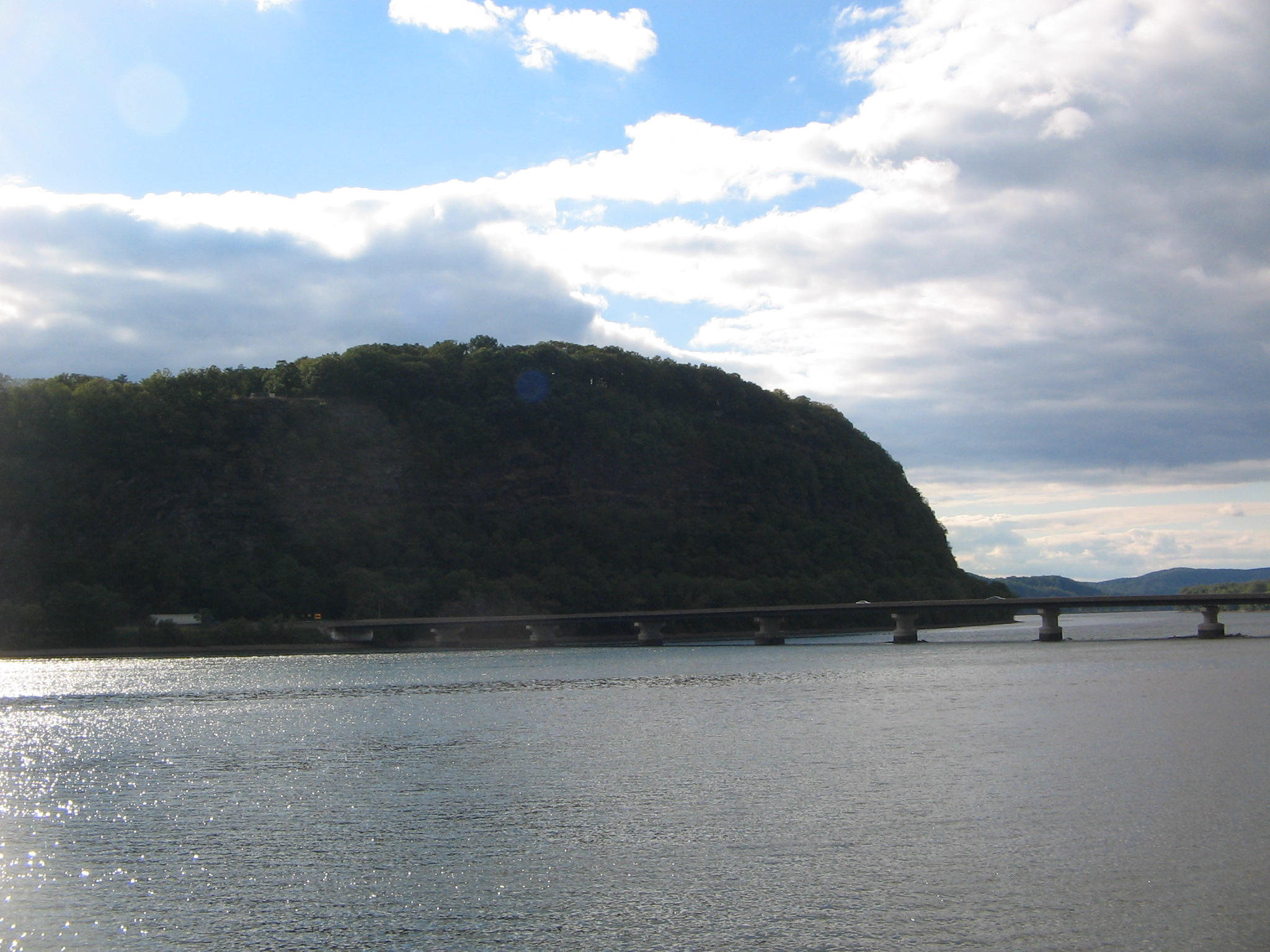
Shikellamy State Park Overlook is on the bluff overlooking the West Branch Susquehanna River (as seen from the Marina part of the park).

=== Marina and research center ===
Shikellamy Marina is on the Susquehanna River. The world's largest inflatable dam is three miles (5 km) downstream from the park. This dam forms Lake Augusta with the banks of the river. Lake Augusta is 3,600 acres (1,500 ha). The purpose of the dam is to provide recreational boating. The river/lake is usually at about 6 feet (1.8 m) in depth at this point.

Beginning in 2010 Lake Augusta Outfitters will be operating a full service marina at the park. Boats such as kayaks and canoes will be available to rent on a daily or hourly basis. Additionally a store will be open to provide snacks, boating gear and gas.

It was announced in 2010 that marina building would be remodeled for the purpose of establishing and environmental education center at the park. The project, to be led by the Susquehanna River Heartland Coalition for Environmental Studies, aims to improve water quality, promote research, provide environmental education and address other concerns related to the Susquehanna River watershed. The research would monitor river quality at 17 locations along the West Branch between Lock Haven and Sunbury. Six colleges and universities that lie in the Susquehanna valley are part of the coalition. Students from Bloomsburg University, Lock Haven University, Susquehanna University, Bucknell University, Lycoming College and King's College would use the new center as a base of operations when conducting studies on the river. The coalition hopes to have the conversion completed by 2011.

=== Boating ===
Boating is very popular at Shikellamy State Park. The river is busy with recreational boaters and water skiing enthusiasts. All types of boats are permitted, provided that are properly registered with the state.

=== Fishing ===
Fishing is a major attraction at Shikellamy State Park. The Susquehanna River is the home of a wide variety of game fish. Anglers will find largemouth bass, smallmouth bass, crappies, catfish, walleye, northern pike, and muskellunge in the waters of Shikellamy State Park

=== Picnics ===
There are many picnic tables available for picnicking spread throughout Shikellamy State Park.

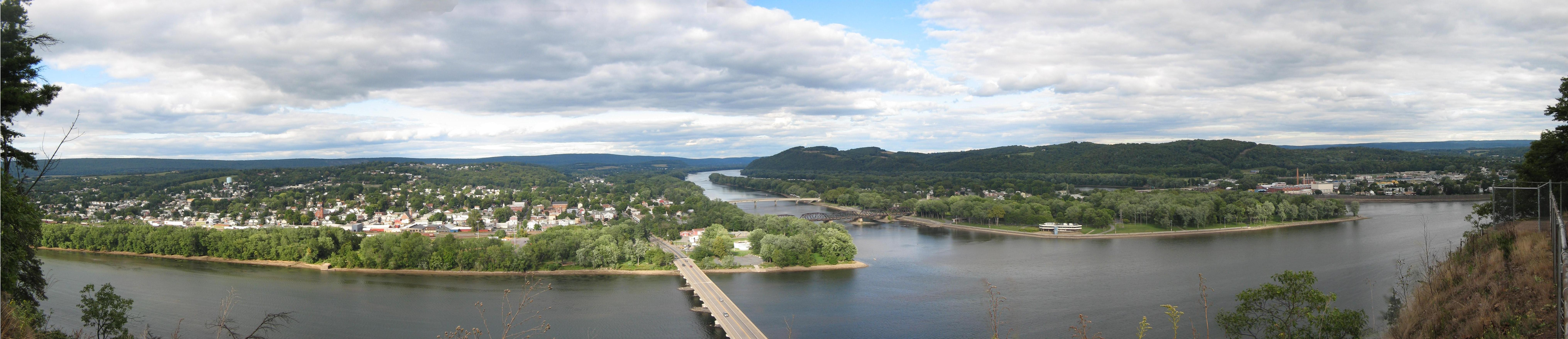
Shikellamy State Park Overlook panorama with the confluence of the West Branch Susquehanna River (left) and North Branch (center) of the Susquehanna River, along with the boroughs of Northumberland (left) and Sunbury (far right). Note Shikellamy State Park Marina unit on Packer Island is also visible, although the docks had already been taken in for the winter when this photo was taken.
