= WOTH =

- Williamsport, Pennsylvania; United States
- Broadcast area: Williamsport, Pennsylvania
- Frequency: 107.9 MHz
- Branding: Hot 107.9

Programming
- Format: Hot adult contemporary
- Affiliations: Westwood One

Ownership
- Owner: Van Michael (sale to Family Life Ministries pending); (Backyard Broadcasting of Pennsylvania LLC)
- Sister stations: WBZD-FM, WCXR, WILQ, WWPA, WZXR

History
- Former call signs: WGBE (1988–1996); WLYC-FM (1996–1997); WSFT (1997–2002); WRVH (2002–2009); WLMY (2009–2020)

Technical information
- Licensing authority: FCC
- Facility ID: 3633
- Class: A
- ERP: 360 watts
- HAAT: 393 meters
- Transmitter coordinates: 41°12′39.00″N 76°57′17.00″W

Links
- Public license information: Public file; LMS
- Webcast: Listen Live
- Website: hot1079radio.com

WOTH (107.9 FM, "Hot 107.9") is a radio station broadcasting a hot adult contemporary format. Licensed to Williamsport, Pennsylvania, United States, the station serves the Williamsport area. The station is currently owned by Van Michael, through licensee Backyard Broadcasting of Pennsylvania LLC.

== History ==
The previous call letters, WRVH, once belonged to a Hudson Valley, New York, FM station, located at 105.5 on the FM dial, broadcasting as a class A facility with 3,000 watts of effective radiated power. Its studio was located on New York State Route 292 in Patterson, NY.

That station was licensed in 1982 and was the brainchild of Edward Valentine, who served as the station's general manager, as well as co-owner. It was owned by Richard Novik of North Salem, and Edward Valentine of Wappingers Falls, a retired engineer with International Business Machines.

The station played "Beautiful Music" format during the weekdays and on Sunday evenings at 7:30PM, the station featured an audiophile-oriented program called "Adventures in Sound", hosted by Anthony Fast. The station changed to Adult Contemporary format after the Beautiful Music format ended in 1986.

The WLMY calls were originally on the station known today as WCOR-FM, in suburban Olean, New York. WBYB was a semi-satellite of WLMI in Kane, PA. In 2008, Backyard Broadcasting had attempted to buy WBYB (then known as WFRM-FM), but could not follow through and lost the bid to WLMI's owners. WLMI changed the call sign to WLMY, but then, switched it quickly to WBYB (while the owner claims this was a reference to the Bob FM brand that WLMI was running, BYB was also, coincidentally, an abbreviation used by Backyard Broadcasting), began broadcasting its own country music format against Backyard's market leader, WPIG, and hired several former WPIG staffers. Thus, Backyard likely picked up the WLMY calls as a (relatively weak) retaliatory gesture.

In another coincidence, WOTH was, in a previous incarnation, the FM sister station to WLYC (AM 1050), which was owned by the same company as WLMI until 2010.

On January 7, 2020, WLMY changed its callsign to WOTH. On January 15, 2020, WOTH launched a contemporary hit radio format, branded as "Hot 107.9". It previously relied on Westwood One's "Hits Now!" network, but moved to the hot adult contemporary network after the company shut down "Hits Now!" in April of 2025.

On November 4, 2026, Family Life Ministries announced that it would acquire WOTH from Backyard Broadcasting for $200,000. In the Spring 2026 Nielsen ratings, WOTH failed to overtake IHeartMedia's WVRT, holding a 2.1 share, with WVRT holding a 4.1.
