= Sunbury, Pennsylvania =

City in Pennsylvania, United States

- City
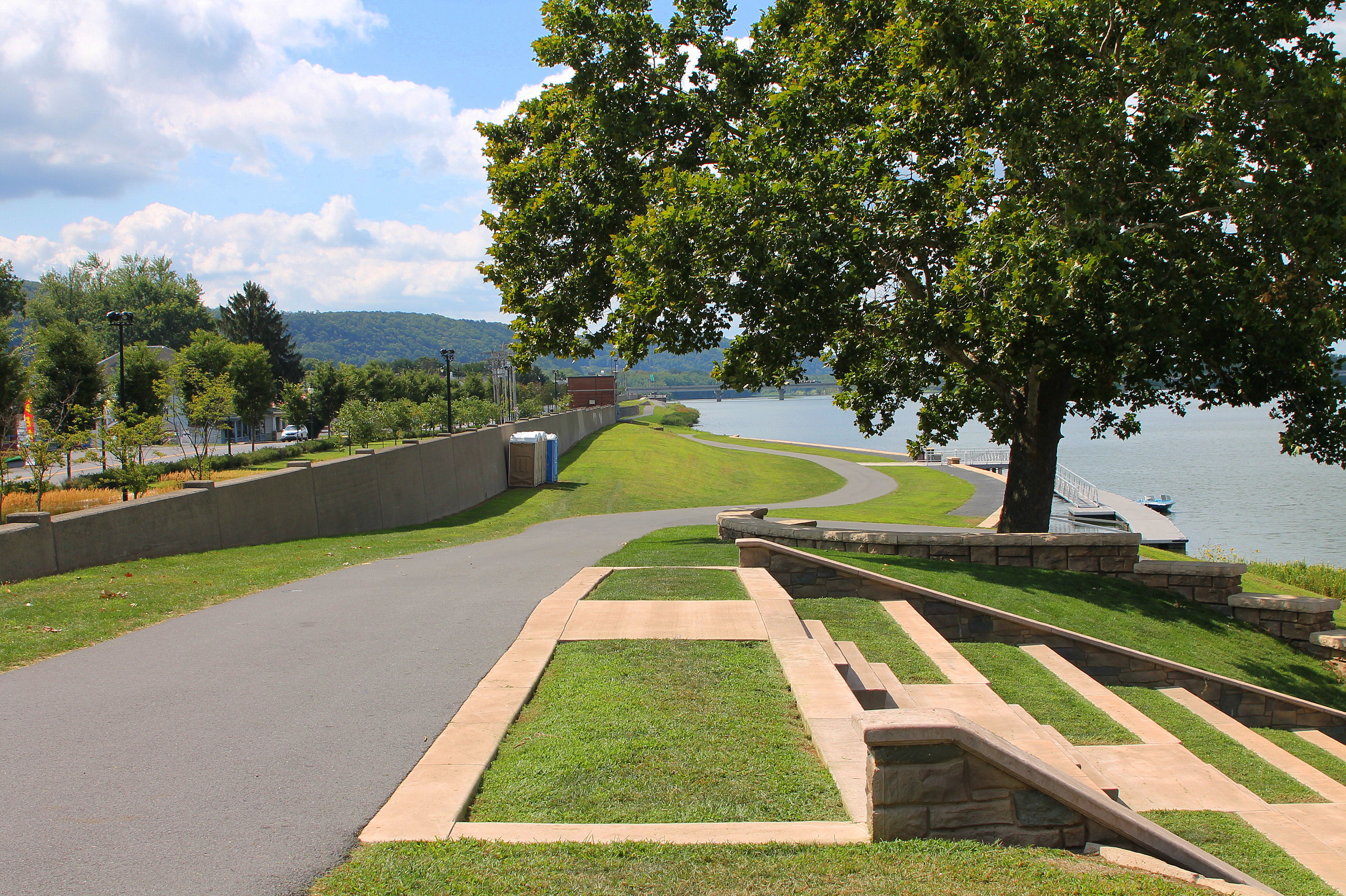
- Riverfront amphitheater and walking path along the Susquehanna River

- Logo

- Location of Sunbury in Northumberland County, Pennsylvania

- Location of Sunbury in Pennsylvania Sunbury (the United States)
- Coordinates: 40°51′50″N 76°47′21″W
- Country: United States
- State: Pennsylvania
- County: Northumberland
- Laid out: 1772
- Incorporated (borough): March 24, 1797
- Incorporated (city): December 29, 1920

Government
  - Type: City
  - Mayor: Joshua A. Brosious (R)

Area
  - Total: 2.11 sq mi (5.46 km^{2})
  - Land: 2.01 sq mi (5.20 km^{2})
  - Water: 0.10 sq mi (0.26 km^{2}) 4.76%
- Elevation (benchmark at city center): 450 ft (140 m)
- Highest elevation (eastern city boundary): 640 ft (200 m)
- Lowest elevation (Susquehanna River): 420 ft (130 m)

Population (2020)
  - Total: 9,719
  - Density: 4,843.5/sq mi (1,870.07/km^{2})
- Time zone: UTC−5 (EST)
  - Summer (DST): UTC−4 (EDT)
- ZIP Code: 17801
- Area codes: 570 and 272
- FIPS code: 42-75304
- Website: City website

Sunbury (/ˈsʌnbɛri/ SUN-berr-ee) is a city in and the county seat of Northumberland County, Pennsylvania, United States. It lies on the east bank of the Susquehanna River at the confluence of the river's North and West branches, about 50 miles (80 km) north of Harrisburg. As of the 2020 United States census, Sunbury had a population of 9,719. It is the principal city of the Sunbury micropolitan statistical area, which comprises Northumberland County and is part of the larger Bloomsburg–Berwick–Sunbury combined statistical area.

The site of Sunbury was long occupied by Shamokin, one of the largest and most important Native American settlements in colonial Pennsylvania, and later by Fort Augusta, the principal British frontier outpost on the upper Susquehanna during the French and Indian War. The town of Sunbury was laid out in 1772 as the seat of the newly created Northumberland County and named after Sunbury-on-Thames, England. In 1883, Thomas Edison's company built the world's first successful three-wire central electric lighting station in Sunbury, and the City Hotel—the first building lit by the system—was later renamed the Hotel Edison in his honor.

Sunbury is the headquarters of the supermarket chain Weis Markets, founded in the city in 1912. Much of the older city is included in the Sunbury Historic District, which is listed on the National Register of Historic Places.

== History ==
=== Shamokin and Fort Augusta ===
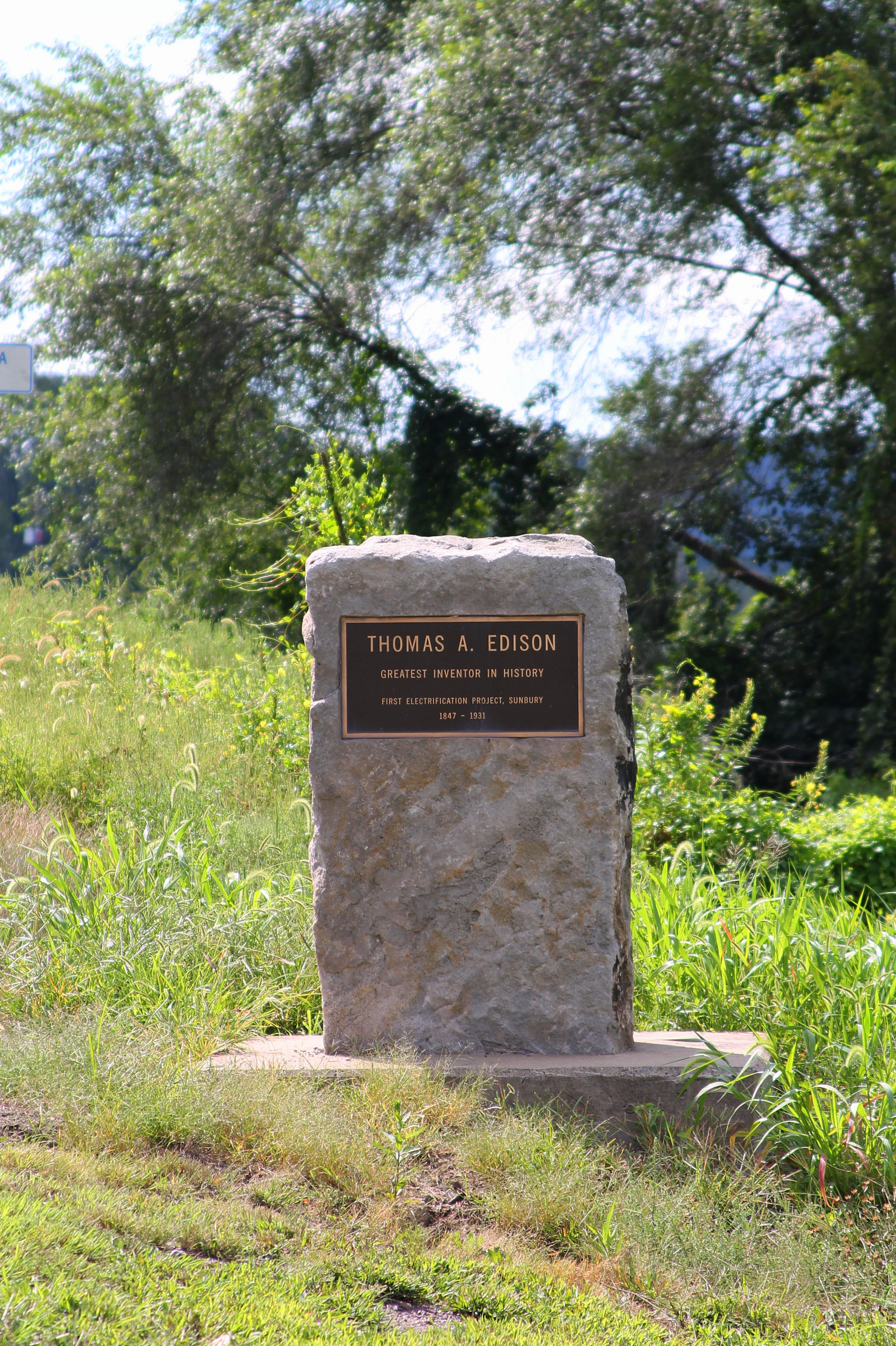
Monument to Thomas Edison near Sunbury

The first known settlers at the site of Sunbury were likely Shawnee migrants. A large population of Delaware Indians was also forcibly resettled there in the early 18th century after they lost rights to their land in the Walking Purchase. Canassatego of the Six Nations, enforcing the Walking Purchase on behalf of George Thomas, Deputy Governor of Pennsylvania, ordered the Delaware Indians to relocate to two places on the Susquehanna River, one of which was present-day Sunbury.

From 1727 to 1756, the village—known as Shamokin, not to be confused with the present-day city of Shamokin about 13 miles (21 km) to the east—was one of the largest and most influential Indian settlements in Pennsylvania. In 1745, Presbyterian missionary David Brainerd described the village as occupying both banks of the river and an island, and reported that it housed 300 Indians, about half of them Delawares and the remainder Senecas and Tutelos. The Oneida chief Shikellamy, who oversaw the region's tribes on behalf of the Six Nations, lived at Shamokin from about 1728 until his death there in 1748.

In 1754, much of the land west of the Susquehanna was transferred from the Six Nations to Pennsylvania at the Albany Congress. Shamokin, however, was not sold; the Six Nations reserved it "to settle such of our Nations as shall come to us from the Ohio or any others who shall deserve to be in our Alliance." According to Weslager, "the Pennsylvania authorities had no opposition to the Six Nations reserving Wyoming and Shamokin from the sale, since friendly Delawares, including Teedyuskung (also known as Teedyuscung) and his people living in those settlements—and any other Indians who might be placed there—constituted a buffer against Connecticut."

The French and Indian War brought fighting to much of the region. The Delaware residents of Shamokin remained neutral early in the war, in part because a drought and unseasonable frost in 1755 had left them without provisions. After the Gnadenhütten massacre in 1755, however, the Delawares at Shamokin joined the war against Pennsylvania and the English, and the village was abandoned in May 1756. The Province of Pennsylvania built Fort Augusta on the site of the abandoned village in 1756–1757, and the fort became the key frontier outpost of the region. The Bloody Spring, where a soldier from the fort's garrison is said to have been killed during the war, is a historic site from the era. During the American Revolutionary War, Fort Augusta served in 1779 as a rendezvous point for troops of the Sullivan Expedition against the Iroquois.

=== Founding and growth ===
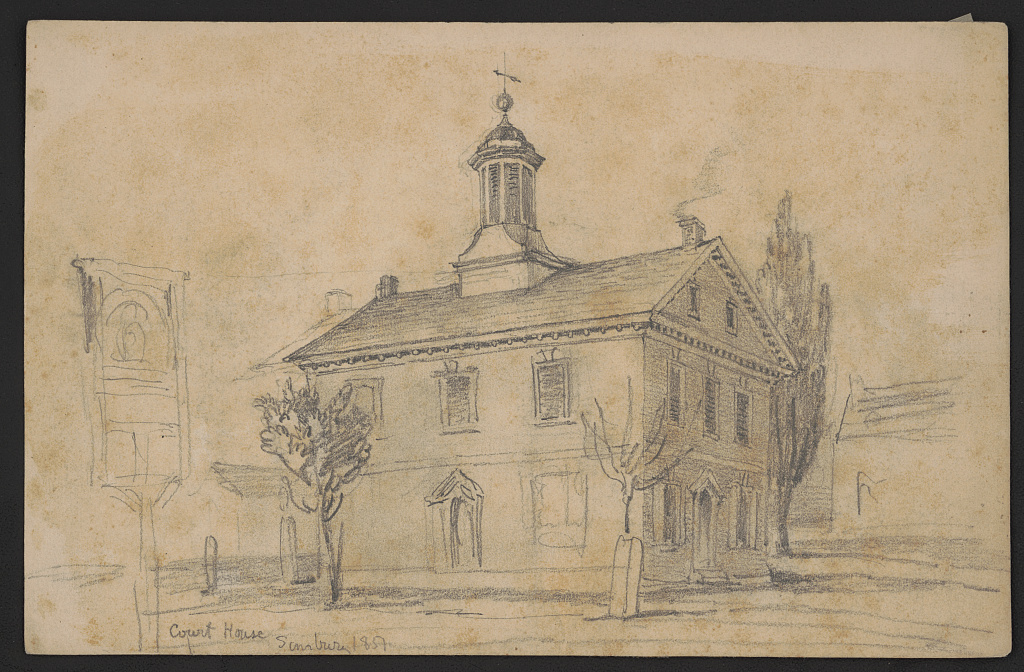
An 1851 sketch of the Northumberland County Courthouse in Sunbury

Northumberland County was created on March 21, 1772, from parts of Lancaster, Cumberland, Berks, Bedford, and Northampton counties. The town of Sunbury was laid out as the county seat later that year by Pennsylvania surveyor general John Lukens, assisted by William Maclay, and the present-day city identifies 1772 as the date of its establishment. It was named after Sunbury-on-Thames in England, which was then in the county of Middlesex. Sunbury was incorporated as a borough on March 24, 1797, and as a city on December 29, 1920.

Lorenzo Da Ponte, the librettist of Mozart and Salieri, lived in Sunbury from 1811 to 1818, working as a teacher, distiller, and merchant.

During the 19th century, Sunbury grew as a transportation and industrial center. The Danville and Pottsville Railroad, a horse-powered line opened between Sunbury and Paxinos in 1835, brought anthracite coal to the riverfront, where it was loaded onto canal boats for shipment to Philadelphia and Baltimore. Later in the century the city became a busy railroad junction, and its industries came to include textiles, metal products, and building materials.

=== Edison and the first three-wire electric station ===
In 1883, Thomas Edison's company installed the world's first successful three-wire central station for incandescent electric lighting in Sunbury. On July 4, 1883, the City Hotel became the first building illuminated by the new system. The hotel kept the City Hotel name for decades; it was renamed the Edison Hotel in July 1922, when Edison returned to Sunbury for the city's 150th anniversary celebration.

=== Flooding and the floodwall ===
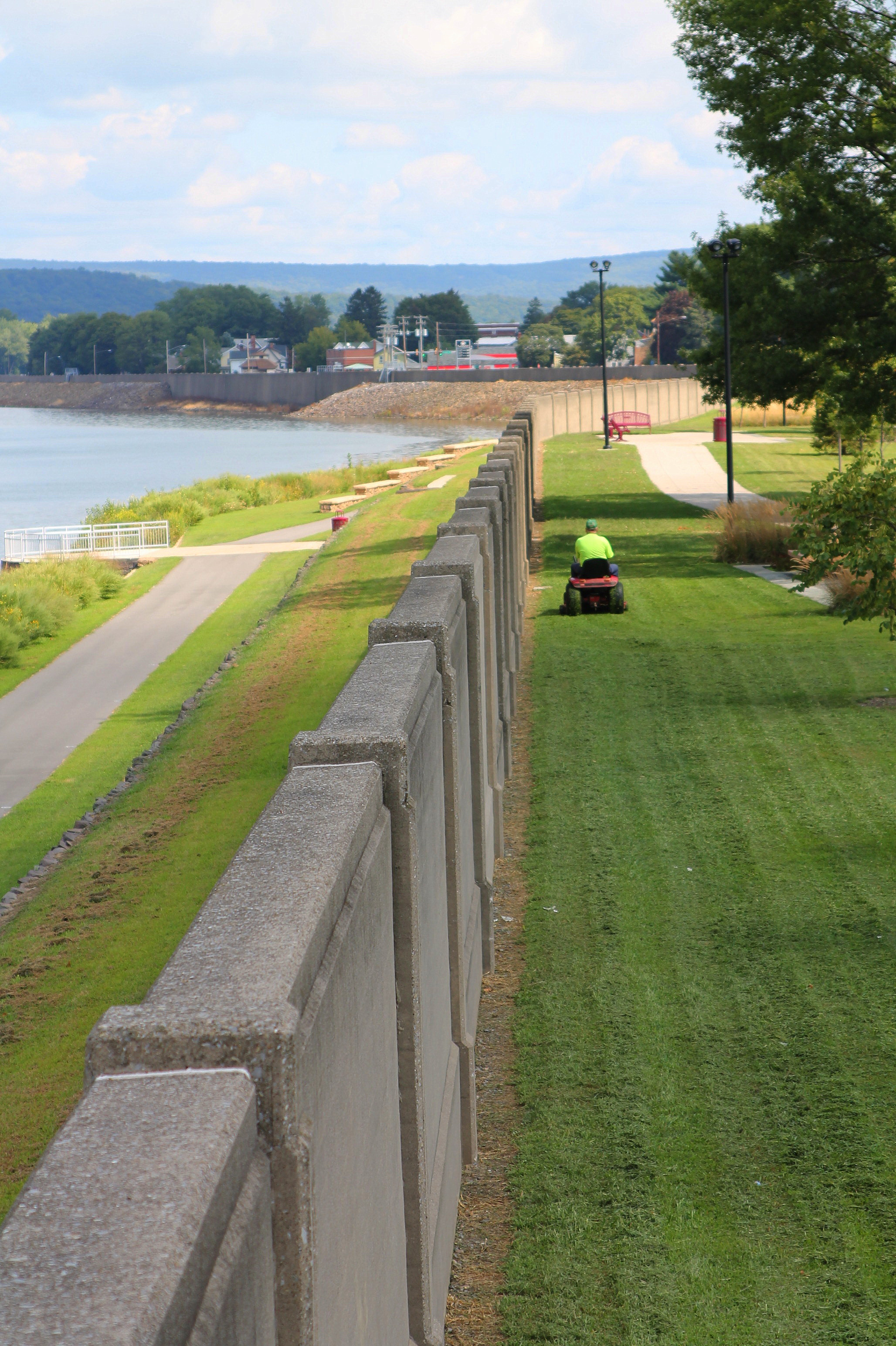
Floodwall in Sunbury

An extensive floodwall protection system was designed and built along the city's riverfront by the United States Army Corps of Engineers in 1951, and additional height was added to the wall in 2003. The system has protected the city from more than a dozen major flood events. In June 1972, floodwaters from Hurricane Agnes crested at 35.8 feet (10.9 m) at Sunbury, two feet higher than the record crest of 1936, but the wall held back the water, and residents wrote messages of gratitude on it afterward.

== Historic sites ==
Several sites in Sunbury are listed on the National Register of Historic Places (NRHP), including the Sunbury Historic District, which encompasses much of the older city between Arch and Chestnut streets.

National Register of Historic Places listings in Sunbury
Name	Built	Location	Listed	NRHP reference no.
Beck House	1785	62 N. Front Street	1976	76001659
Northumberland County Courthouse	1865	201 Market Street	1974	74001800
Sunbury Armory	1938	206 Armory Road	1989	89002082
Sunbury Historic District	—	Roughly bounded by Arch and Chestnut Streets	1983	83004240

Two other NRHP-listed sites carry Sunbury addresses but stand outside the city limits: the Keefer Station Covered Bridge (1888), which crosses Shamokin Creek northeast of the city, and the Caspar Snyder House (1798) in Lower Augusta Township.

Other notable historic buildings in the city include the Hotel Edison (built in 1871 as the City Hotel and renamed for Thomas Edison in 1922) and the Maclay–Wolverton House (1773).

=== Pennsylvania state historical markers ===
The Pennsylvania Historical and Museum Commission has placed more than a dozen state historical markers in and around Sunbury commemorating the city's colonial, Revolutionary, industrial, and cultural history. They include markers for:

- The Bloody Spring (1967)
- Danville–Pottsville Railroad (1947)
- First Electric Light (1947)
- Fort Augusta (1948)
- Lorenzo Da Ponte (1994)
- Northumberland County (1982)
- Shikellamy (1915 memorial and 1947 marker)
- The Sullivan Expedition – Fort Augusta (1929)
- Sunbury (two markers, 1947)
- Thompson's Rifle Battalion: Capt. John Lowdon's Company (1987)
- William Maclay (1947)

== Geography ==
Sunbury is at 40°51′50″N 76°47′21″W (40.863894, −76.789174), on the east bank of the Susquehanna River at the point where the river's North and West branches converge. The city is about 50 miles (80 km) north of Harrisburg.

According to the United States Census Bureau, the city has a total area of 2.11 square miles (5.5 km^{2}), of which 2.01 square miles (5.2 km^{2}) is land and 0.10 square miles (0.26 km^{2}) (4.8%) is water.

=== Climate ===
Climate data for Sunbury, Pennsylvania (1991–2020 normals, extremes 1957–present)
Month	Jan	Feb	Mar	Apr	May	Jun	Jul	Aug	Sep	Oct	Nov	Dec	Year
Record high °F (°C)	71 (22)	77 (25)	81 (27)	91 (33)	97 (36)	100 (38)	102 (39)	99 (37)	96 (36)	91 (33)	78 (26)	71 (22)	102 (39)
Mean daily maximum °F (°C)	35.3 (1.8)	39.0 (3.9)	47.7 (8.7)	61.1 (16.2)	71.7 (22.1)	79.8 (26.6)	84.4 (29.1)	82.2 (27.9)	75.1 (23.9)	63.6 (17.6)	50.8 (10.4)	40.1 (4.5)	60.9 (16.1)
Daily mean °F (°C)	27.1 (−2.7)	29.8 (−1.2)	37.6 (3.1)	49.2 (9.6)	59.5 (15.3)	68.3 (20.2)	72.4 (22.4)	70.7 (21.5)	63.1 (17.3)	52.0 (11.1)	41.3 (5.2)	32.3 (0.2)	50.3 (10.2)
Mean daily minimum °F (°C)	18.9 (−7.3)	20.6 (−6.3)	27.4 (−2.6)	37.2 (2.9)	47.2 (8.4)	56.8 (13.8)	60.3 (15.7)	59.2 (15.1)	51.2 (10.7)	40.4 (4.7)	31.8 (−0.1)	24.6 (−4.1)	39.6 (4.2)
Record low °F (°C)	−15 (−26)	−10 (−23)	−1 (−18)	16 (−9)	28 (−2)	37 (3)	41 (5)	41 (5)	27 (−3)	0 (−18)	8 (−13)	−12 (−24)	−15 (−26)
Average precipitation inches (mm)	2.98 (76)	2.30 (58)	3.33 (85)	3.74 (95)	3.77 (96)	4.38 (111)	4.32 (110)	3.93 (100)	4.52 (115)	3.92 (100)	3.16 (80)	3.34 (85)	43.69 (1,110)
Average snowfall inches (cm)	7.6 (19)	8.6 (22)	5.2 (13)	0.6 (1.5)	0.0 (0.0)	0.0 (0.0)	0.0 (0.0)	0.0 (0.0)	0.0 (0.0)	0.2 (0.51)	1.5 (3.8)	4.9 (12)	28.6 (73)
Average precipitation days (≥ 0.01 in)	10.0	8.9	9.8	12.1	13.5	12.4	10.6	11.0	9.1	10.8	8.8	10.0	127.0
Average snowy days (≥ 0.1 in)	4.4	4.2	1.9	0.4	0.0	0.0	0.0	0.0	0.0	0.1	0.7	2.4	14.1
Source: NOAA

== Demographics ==
Historical population
Census	Pop.	Note	%±
1800	613		—
1810	790		28.9%
1820	861		9.0%
1830	1,056		22.6%
1840	1,108		4.9%
1850	1,218		9.9%
1860	1,803		48.0%
1870	3,131		73.7%
1880	4,077		30.2%
1890	5,930		45.5%
1900	9,810		65.4%
1910	13,770		40.4%
1920	15,721		14.2%
1930	15,626		−0.6%
1940	15,462		−1.0%
1950	15,570		0.7%
1960	13,687		−12.1%
1970	13,025		−4.8%
1980	12,292		−5.6%
1990	11,591		−5.7%
2000	10,610		−8.5%
2010	9,905		−6.6%
2020	9,719		−1.9%
U.S. Decennial Census

Sunbury's population peaked at 15,721 in the 1920 census and has declined in most decades since. The city is the principal city of the Sunbury micropolitan statistical area, which consists of Northumberland County. The Office of Management and Budget groups the Sunbury area with the Bloomsburg–Berwick metropolitan area and the Lewisburg (Union County) and Selinsgrove (Snyder County) micropolitan areas as the Bloomsburg–Berwick–Sunbury combined statistical area.

=== 2020 census ===
As of the 2020 census, Sunbury had a population of 9,719. The median age was 39.1 years; 23.0% of residents were under the age of 18 and 17.8% were 65 years of age or older. For every 100 females there were 91.8 males, and for every 100 females age 18 and over there were 88.8 males age 18 and over. All of the city's residents lived in areas classified as urban.

There were 4,266 households, of which 26.9% had children under the age of 18 living in them. Of all households, 30.1% were married-couple households, 23.6% had a male householder with no spouse or partner present, and 34.7% had a female householder with no spouse or partner present. About 38.3% of all households were made up of individuals, and 16.1% had someone living alone who was 65 years of age or older. There were 4,790 housing units, of which 10.9% were vacant; the homeowner vacancy rate was 2.6% and the rental vacancy rate was 7.1%.

Racial composition as of the 2020 census
Race	Number	Percent
White	8,036	82.7%
Black or African American	369	3.8%
American Indian and Alaska Native	22	0.2%
Asian	26	0.3%
Native Hawaiian and Other Pacific Islander	6	0.1%
Some other race	561	5.8%
Two or more races	699	7.2%
Hispanic or Latino (of any race)	1,199	12.3%

=== Earlier censuses ===
As of the 2010 census, there were 9,905 people residing in the city. At the 2000 census, the city's 10,610 residents were 95.26% White, 1.29% African American, 0.26% Asian, 1.91% from other races, and 1.11% from two or more races; Hispanic or Latino residents of any race were 3.09% of the population, and the median age was 37 years.

=== Income and poverty ===
According to American Community Survey estimates for 2017–2021, the median household income in Sunbury was $37,851 and the mean household income was $52,975. About 19.8% of the population was below the poverty line.

== Economy ==
Weis Markets, a supermarket chain operating in seven states, was founded in Sunbury in 1912 by brothers Harry and Sigmund Weis and remains headquartered in the city.

Great Coasters International, a designer and builder of wooden roller coasters for parks around the world, is headquartered on State Route 890 just outside the city, with a Sunbury address.

Several family businesses in the city date to the 19th and early 20th centuries. Zimmerman Motors on Market Street began making horse-drawn carriages in 1889 and now sells automobiles, and the Sunbury Motor Company on North Fourth Street has operated since 1915. The Squeeze-In, a five-stool hot dog stand on Market Street, has been serving hot dogs since 1945 and celebrated its 80th anniversary in 2025.

== Arts and culture ==
The Degenstein Community Library, at 40 South Fifth Street, was founded in 1937 as the Sunbury Public Library; its current building, funded largely by a gift from local businessman Charles B. Degenstein, opened in 2002. The library provides books, internet access, educational classes, summer reading, and adult and youth programs.

The Northumberland County Historical Society, based at the Fort Augusta site on North Front Street, maintains the Charlotte Darrah Walter Genealogical Library, which holds local history material and records of early families from Northumberland and surrounding counties. Its permanent exhibits cover the site in prehistoric times, the Moravian mission and blacksmith shop at Shamokin, and Fort Augusta during the French and Indian War and the Revolutionary War.

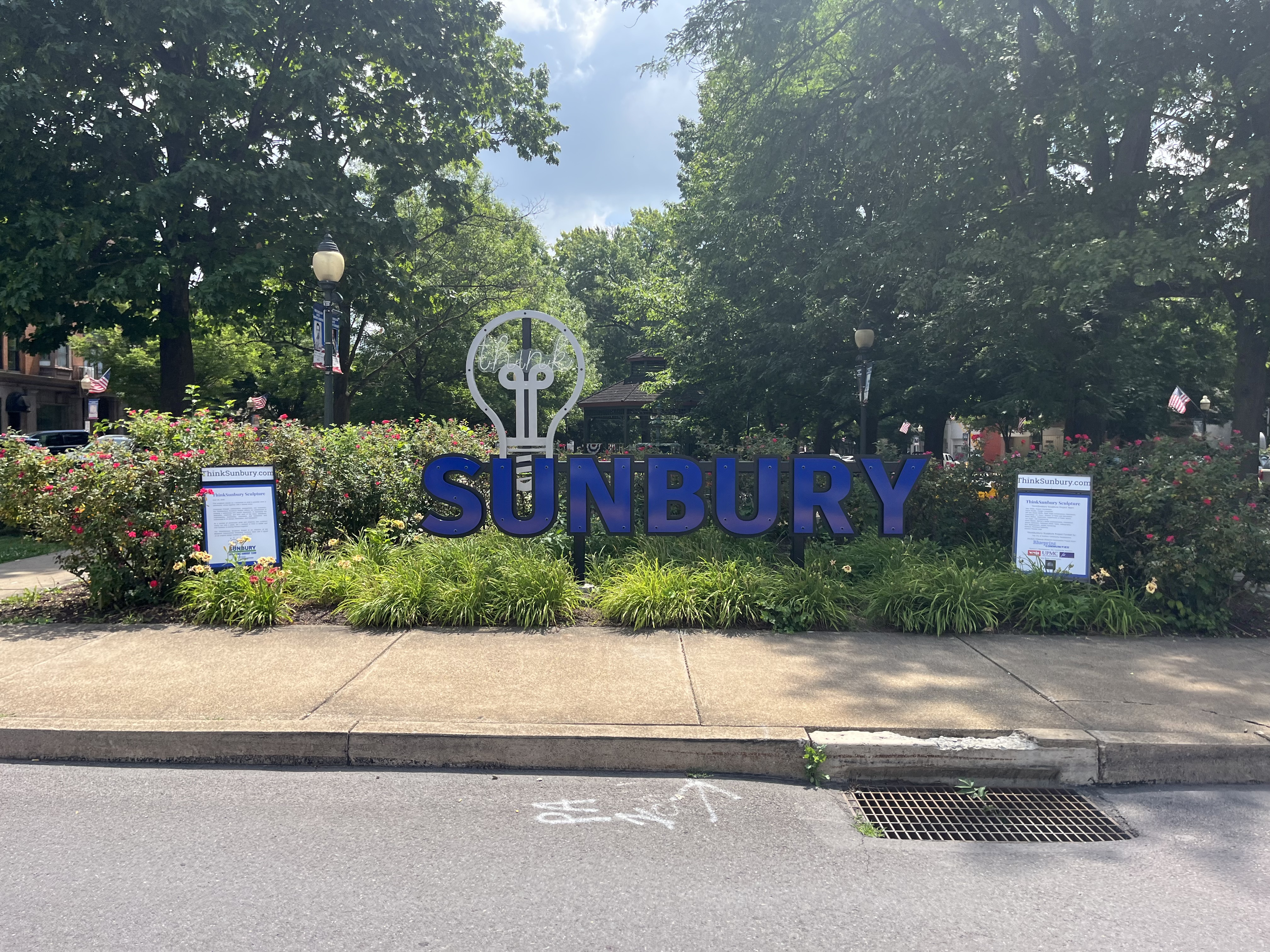
The "Think Sunbury" sign in Cameron Park, unveiled in 2026 by Sunbury's Revitalization, Inc.

Sunbury's Revitalization, Inc. (SRI), a downtown revitalization organization, promotes the city under the "Think Sunbury" brand and organizes the annual Sunbury River Festival, held the third weekend of August, with music, vendors, food, and art celebrating the city's riverfront location. In June 2026, marking its 40th anniversary, SRI unveiled an illuminated "Think Sunbury" sign at the western end of Cameron Park as a landmark of its revitalization efforts.

=== In popular culture ===
In "Nixon vs. Kennedy", a first-season episode of the AMC drama Mad Men, a train carrying the casket of Pvt. Dick Whitman, reportedly killed in the Korean War, arrives in Sunbury, where it is met by Whitman's family. The escort officer, Lt. Don Draper, is in fact Dick Whitman, who has switched identities with the real Draper; his younger half-brother Adam recognizes him and chases the departing train.

== Parks and recreation ==
Sunbury Riverfront Park stretches along the Susquehanna between Race Street and the Route 61 bridge. The park includes a 1-mile (1.6 km) paved walking trail along the historic floodwall, the Sunbury Amphitheater, a boat dock, and a fishing pier.

The Adam T. Bower Memorial Dam, an inflatable fabric-tube dam across the Susquehanna, creates the 3,000-acre (12 km^{2}) Lake Augusta for boating and other recreation; it is inflated in the late spring and deflated in the fall. The Marina Section of Shikellamy State Park occupies the tip of Packers Island at the confluence of the river's branches opposite the city, with a marina, boat launches, picnic areas, and paved paths. In June 2025, the state opened a $5.3 million naturalistic fish passage—a 900-foot (270 m) boulder-lined channel around the western end of the dam—allowing shad, river herring, eels, and other migratory fish to bypass the dam.

The city also offers baseball fields, a skating park, tennis courts, playgrounds, a community pool, and a small park next to the county courthouse downtown.

== Government ==
Sunbury is governed by a mayor and a four-member city council; the mayor shares the authority and duties of running the city with the council and directly supervises the police department. A city treasurer and controller are elected independently to four-year terms. The mayor is Joshua A. Brosious, a Republican first elected in November 2021 and re-elected in November 2025.

As the seat of Northumberland County, Sunbury is home to the Northumberland County Courthouse and county government offices.

== Education ==
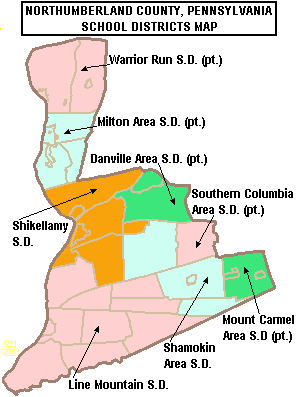
Map of Northumberland County school districts

Sunbury is served by the Shikellamy School District, which operates three elementary schools in the city—Chief Shikellamy, Grace S. Beck, and Oaklyn—along with Priestley Elementary School and Shikellamy Middle School in nearby Northumberland and Shikellamy High School in Sunbury.

Lackawanna College operates its Sunbury Center in the city, and Triangle Tech, a private technical trade school, has a Sunbury campus.

== Media ==
Sunbury's daily newspaper is The Daily Item. The Sunbury Broadcasting Corporation, based in the city, operates the news/talk station WKOK (1070 AM), contemporary hit station WQKX (94.1 FM), and classic rock station Eagle 107. Other regional radio stations also serve the Sunbury area.

== Infrastructure ==
=== Transportation ===
Sunbury is served by three state highways: PA 61, PA 147, and PA 405. PA 61 reaches its northern terminus in the city after crossing the Susquehanna from Shamokin Dam on the Veterans Memorial Bridge, which links Sunbury with US 11 / US 15 on the river's west bank. PA 147, which formerly ran the length of the city along Front Street, now passes through only the south end of Sunbury: when the route was relocated onto the newly opened northern section of the Central Susquehanna Valley Thruway in 2022, its former alignment through the rest of the city and neighboring Northumberland was redesignated as part of PA 405.

Freight rail service in the city is provided by the Shamokin Valley Railroad, a short line owned by the SEDA-COG Joint Rail Authority and operated by the North Shore Railroad Company.

=== Healthcare ===
Sunbury Community Hospital, the city's only hospital, was acquired by UPMC Susquehanna and operated as UPMC Sunbury until it closed in March 2020. The building remained vacant as of late 2024.

== Notable people ==
- Tim Boetsch, mixed martial artist and former UFC fighter
- Betty Brice (1888–1935), silent film actress
- William Clapham (1722–1763), colonial soldier who supervised the construction of Fort Augusta in 1756–1757
- Charles M. Clement, Pennsylvania National Guard major general
- Birdie Cree (1882–1942), Major League Baseball outfielder for the New York Highlanders (now the Yankees)
- Herbert W. Cummings (1873–1956), member of the U.S. House of Representatives
- Lorenzo Da Ponte (1749–1838), librettist for Mozart's The Marriage of Figaro, Don Giovanni, and Così fan tutte; lived in Sunbury from 1811 to 1818
- Charles L. Dering, Wisconsin lawyer and politician, born in Sunbury
- Lewis Dewart (1780–1852), member of the U.S. House of Representatives
- William Lewis Dewart (1821–1888), member of the U.S. House of Representatives
- Euell Gibbons, outdoorsman and early health food advocate
- John P. S. Gobin, lieutenant governor of Pennsylvania and Civil War commander of the 47th Pennsylvania Volunteer Infantry
- I. Clinton Kline (1858–1947), member of the U.S. House of Representatives
- Steve Kline, Major League Baseball pitcher
- Brenda Lewis, Metropolitan Opera soprano and Broadway performer
- William Maclay (1737–1804), U.S. senator in the first Congress; helped survey Sunbury in 1772
- Timothy Murphy, Revolutionary War rifleman noted for his marksmanship at the Battle of Bemis Heights
- John B. Packer (1824–1891), member of the U.S. House of Representatives
- Glen Retief, Lambda Literary Award–winning author of The Jack Bank: A Memoir of a South African Childhood
- Shikellamy (died 1748), Oneida chief and Six Nations representative who lived at the village of Shamokin, on the site of present-day Sunbury
- Mark Smith, racing driver
- Peterson Toscano, playwright, actor, Bible scholar, and human rights activist
- Simon P. Wolverton (1837–1910), member of the U.S. House of Representatives
