= Noori (disambiguation) =

Noori is a Pakistani rock band.

Noori may also refer to:

- Noori (surname)
- Noori waterfall, Haripur, Khyber Pakhtunkhwa, Pakistan
- Noori (goat), first pashmina goat to be cloned using the process of nuclear transfer

== See also ==
- Bae Noo-ri (born 1993), South Korean actress
- Nuri (name)
- Nuri (disambiguation)
- Nori (disambiguation)
- Noorie, a 1979 Indian film
