= Norry (disambiguation) =

Norry is an improvised Cambodian railway vehicle

Norry may also refer to:

== People ==
- Hillel Norry, American rabbi
- Lynda Norry (born 1967) bowler
- Marilyn Norry, Canadian actress

== Locations ==
- Northumberland, Pennsylvania, a borough and county in PA

== See also ==
- Nori (disambiguation)
- Norrie (disambiguation)
