= Noori (surname) =

Noori is a surname. Notable people with the surname include:

- Abdollah Noori, Iranian cleric and reformist politician
- Adel Noori, Uyghur refugee
- Ahmed Ali Noori, Pakistani politician
- Amar Noori, Indian singer and actress
- Amir Noori, Iranian football player
- Farhad Noori, 2025 Munich car attack suspect
- Fazlollah Noori, major figure in Iranian Constitutional Revolution
- Hadi Noori, Swedish football player
- Hossein Noori Hamedani, Iranian Twelver Shi'a Marja
- Manozh Noori, Afghan football player
- Mohammad Noori, Iranian football player
- Muhammad Saeed Noori, Indian Sunni leader
- Milad Noori, Iranian football player
- Mirza Husain Noori Tabarsi, Shi'a Islamic scholar
- Noorullah Noori, militant and Minister of Borders and Tribal Affairs of the Islamic Emirate of Afghanistan
- Osama Noori, Iraqi football player
- Pejman Noori, Iranian football player
- Saeed Noori, December 2017 Melbourne car attack perpetrator
- Shabir Noori, Afghanistan cricketer
- Shakir Ali Noori, Indian Sunni Muslim scholar
- Sweeta Noori, advocate for women's rights in Afghanistan
- Yousef Noori, Iranian politician

== See also ==
- Nuri (name)
