= Nori (disambiguation) =

Nori is the Japanese name for various edible seaweed species.

Nori may also refer to:

== People with the given name ==
- Nór or Nori, the legendary first king of Norway
- Nori Aoki (born 1982), Japanese baseball outfielder
- Nori Reed, American comedian and writer
- Nori Shiraishi (born 1986), Japanese producer, model, singer and songwriter
- Nori Dalisay (born 1938), Filipina actress
- Nori (Middle-earth), a character in The Hobbit
- Nori, a character in Barbie: Mermaidia
- Nori, a character in Hidamari Sketch
- Nori Doorman, Uzi Doorman's mother from the webseries Murder Drones (2021-2024)

== People with the surname ==
- Andrew Nori (1952–2013), Solomon Islands lawyer and politician
- Cathy Nori (born 1967), Solomon Islands politician
- Dante Nori (born 2004), Canadian-born American baseball player
- Dattatreyudu Nori (fl. 1970s–present), Indian radiation oncologist
- Francesco Nori (1565–1631), Roman Catholic prelate
- Francesco Nori (1430–1478), Italian banker
- Greig Nori (born 1974), Canadian producer and musician
- Micah Nori (born 1974), American basketball coach
- Mpok Nori (1930–2015), Indonesian comedian and actress
- Sandra Nori (born 1953), retired Australian politician

== Other uses ==
- Accrington brick or Nori, a type of engineering brick
- NORI, the Nuclear Medicine, Oncology and Radiotherapy Institute in Pakistan
- Nori, the Ngarrindjeri word for the Australian pelican
- Nori (company), carbon removal company in the United States
- Nori language (Papuan)
- Nori language (Colombia)
- Norry or nori, an improvised rail vehicle from Cambodia

== See also ==
- Noorie, a 1979 Hindi romance film
- Nuri (disambiguation)
- Noori (disambiguation)
- Norrie (disambiguation)
- Norry (disambiguation)
- Nory, a village in Poland
