= Temple Beth-El (Birmingham, Alabama) =

Synagogue in Alabama

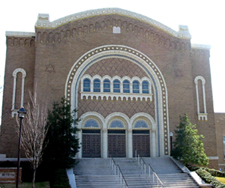

- Location in Alabama

Religion
- Affiliation: Conservative Judaism
- Ecclesiastical or organisational status: Synagogue
- Leadership: Rabbi Steven Henkin
- Status: Active

Location
- Location: 2179 Highland Avenue, Birmingham, Alabama
- Country: United States
- Administration: United Synagogue of Conservative Judaism
- Coordinates: 33°30′00″N 86°47′25″W

Architecture
- Established: 1907 (as a congregation)
- Completed: 1926

Website
- templebeth-el.net

Temple Beth-El is a Conservative synagogue located in Birmingham, Alabama, in the United States. Founded in 1907, Temple Beth-El is a member of the United Synagogue of Conservative Judaism. Temple Beth-El is the only Conservative-affiliated synagogue in Birmingham, and one of only four Conservative synagogues in Alabama.

Rabbi Steven Henkin has served as rabbi since July 2022.

== History ==
The first Jews arrived in Birmingham in 1873. They were attracted there by potential business opportunities in this burgeoning coal and ore center of the South. In 1881, a dozen families gathered for the first Rosh Hashanah services which were held in a private home. The 1880s saw a great influx of Jewish newcomers to Birmingham. In 1882, Temple Emanu-El was formally incorporated. With a membership of 100 families, the Reform congregation dedicated its first synagogue building in 1889.

An embryonic Orthodox congregation, Knesseth Israel, erected its first synagogue in 1903 to serve the large number of immigrants coming from Eastern Europe. The third synagogue in Birmingham, Temple Beth-El, was chartered in 1907 as a second Orthodox-affiliated congregation. This group became a part of the Conservative movement in 1944.

Temple Beth-El's current sanctuary was built in 1926 and the facility is located at 2179 Highland Avenue on the Southside of Birmingham. Renovations in the 1990s added a cultural center and classrooms, and further renovations were completed in the 2000s (decade) to the sanctuary, chapel, and social hall. Temple Beth-El is one of the few Conservative synagogues in the United States to have its own mikvah.

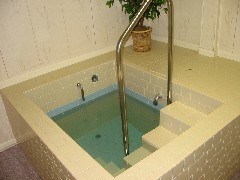
The mikveh at Temple Beth-El.

Currently, Temple Beth-El serves approximately 600-700 Jewish families in the Birmingham area. Other affiliations include a chapter of Sisterhood (affiliated with the national Women's League for Conservative Judaism), a Men's Club (affiliated with the Federation of Jewish Men's Clubs) and youth groups active within the umbrella organization United Synagogue Youth.

Hillel Norry served as interim rabbi from June 2021 until July 2022. Rabbi Steven Henkin was installed in January 2024.

== Involvement in the Civil Rights era ==
The 1950s and 1960s were a period of upheaval in Birmingham as protesters and police often clashed in the streets during the civil rights movement, including the bombings of religious institutions. On April 28, 1958, 54 sticks of dynamite were placed outside Temple Beth-El in a bombing attempt. Police reported that the burning fuses were doused by heavy rainfall, preventing the dynamite from exploding. Although the crime was never solved, police considered Bobby Frank Cherry, later convicted of bombing the Sixteenth Street Baptist Church, to be a suspect.

== The Beth El Civil Rights Experience ==
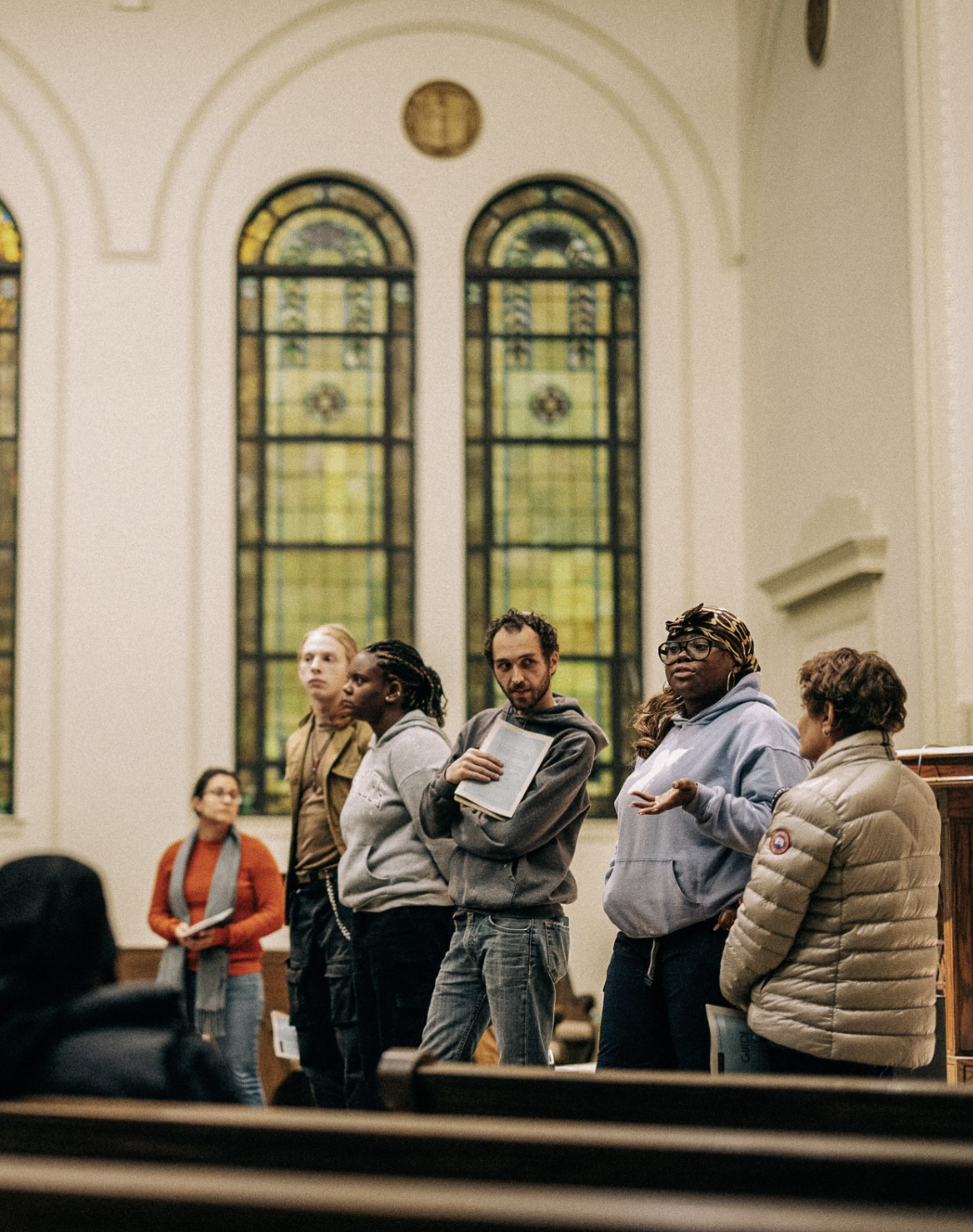
A group of participants share during the immersive exhibit

In January 2024, an immersive exhibit opened at Temple Beth El exploring the intersection between the Jewish community and the Civil Rights Movement. The exhibit is part of a broader initiative to recognize the 1958 attempted bombing at Temple Beth El and build “connections to foster ongoing acts of tikkun olam, repairing the world.”
