= Joseph Priestley House =

Historic house in Pennsylvania, United States

- U.S. National Register of Historic Places
- U.S. National Historic Landmark
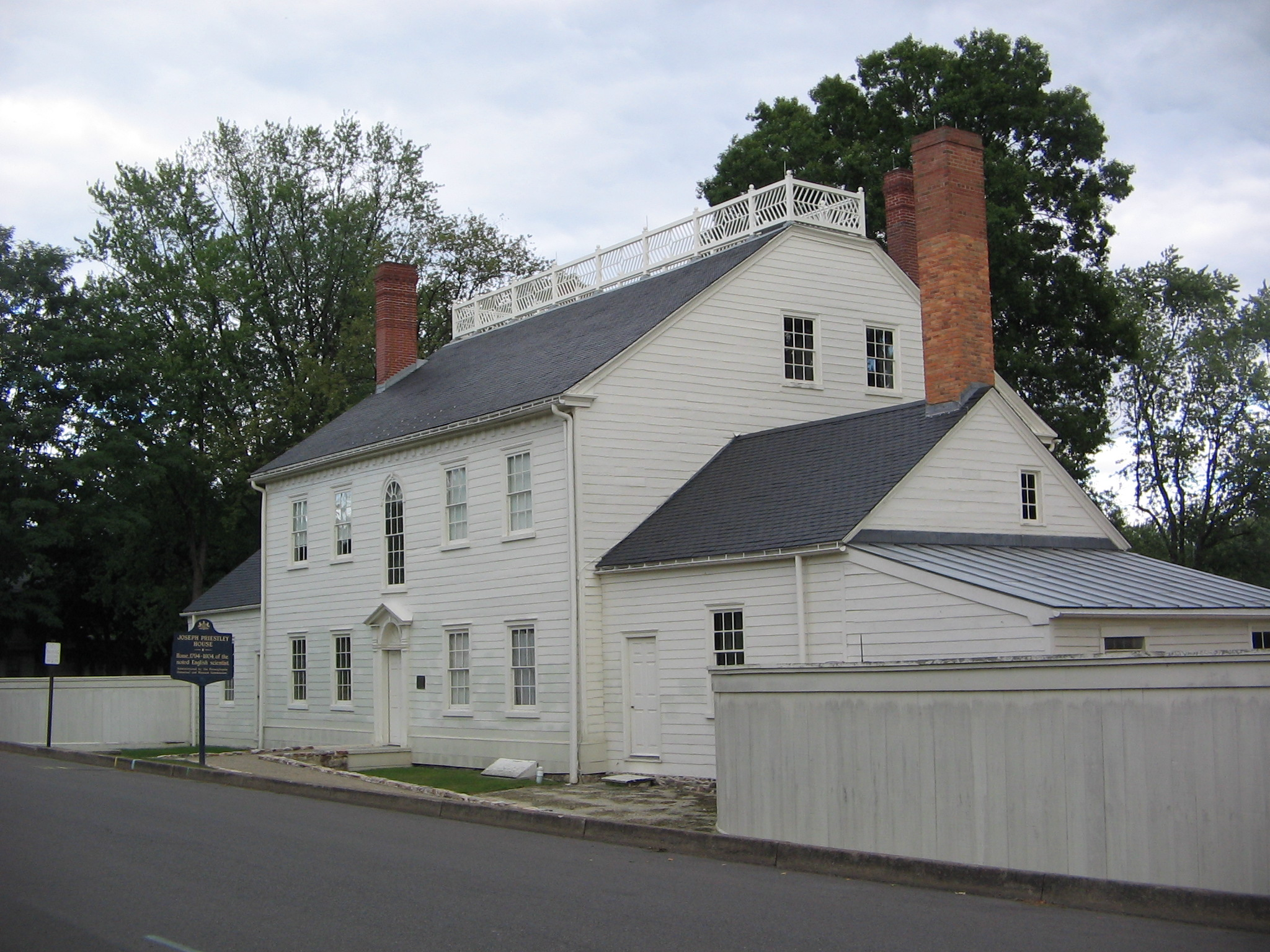
- Priestley Avenue side of the Joseph Priestley House in 2007

- Location within Pennsylvania Location within the United States
- Location: Northumberland, Pennsylvania
- Coordinates: 40°53′25.8″N 76°47′23.5″W
- Area: 1 acre (0.40 ha)
- Built: 1794–1798
- Architectural style: Georgian, Federal
- NRHP reference No.: 66000673

Significant dates
- Added to NRHP: January 12, 1965
- Designated NHL: October 15, 1966

The Joseph Priestley House was the American home of eighteenth-century British theologian, Dissenting clergyman, natural philosopher (and co-discoverer of oxygen), educator, and political theorist Joseph Priestley from 1798 until his death. Located in Northumberland, Pennsylvania, United States, the house, which was designed by Priestley's wife Mary, is Georgian with Federalist accents. The Pennsylvania Historical and Museum Commission (PHMC) operated it as a museum dedicated to Joseph Priestley from 1970 to August 2009, when it closed due to low visitation and budget cuts. The house reopened in October 2009, still owned by the PHMC but operated by the Friends of Joseph Priestley House (FJPH).

Fleeing religious persecution and political turmoil in Britain, the Priestleys emigrated to the United States in 1794 seeking a peaceful life. Hoping to avoid the political troubles that had plagued them in Britain and the problems of urban life they saw in the United States, the Priestleys built a house in rural Pennsylvania. Nevertheless, political disputes and family troubles dogged Priestley during the last ten years of his life.

After the Priestleys died, their home remained in private hands until the turn of the twentieth century, when George Gilbert Pond, a professor from what is now Pennsylvania State University, bought it and attempted to found the first Priestley museum. He died before he could complete the project and it was not until the 1960s that the house was first carefully restored by the PHMC and designated a National Historic Landmark.

A second renovation was undertaken in the 1990s to return the home to the way it looked during Priestley's time. The home has been a frequent place of celebration for the American Chemical Society; they commemorated the centennial and bicentennial of the discovery of oxygen gas by Priestley as well as the 250th anniversary of Priestley's birth.

== Location ==
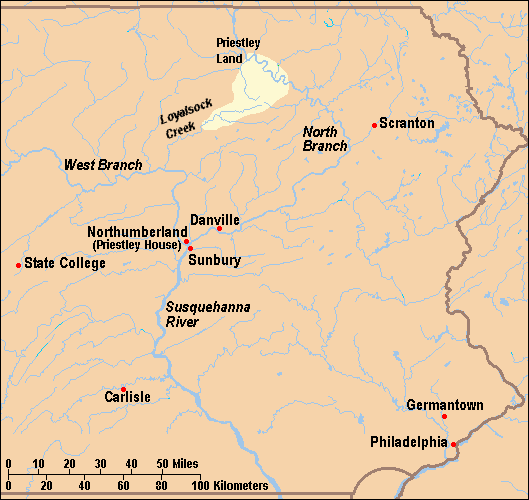
Map of eastern Pennsylvania showing important locations for the history of Joseph Priestley and the area

Following the French and Indian War (1755–1763) and the forced migration of Native American tribes westward, German, Scots-Irish, and other European immigrants settled in the central Susquehanna Valley, including in the area that would become Northumberland, Pennsylvania. Northumberland was laid out around a central village green in 1772, on land originally purchased from the Iroquois by the Province of Pennsylvania in 1768, as part of the first Treaty of Fort Stanwix.

During the American Revolution, the village was evacuated as part of the Big Runaway in 1778, and only finally resettled in 1784. In 1794, when the Priestleys moved there, it included Quaker and Wesleyan meeting houses, a brewery, two potteries, a potash manufacturer, a clock maker, a printer (who issued a weekly newspaper), several stores, and approximately one hundred houses.

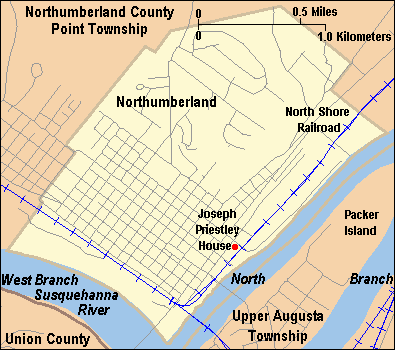
Map of Northumberland, Pennsylvania showing the Priestley House at the confluence of the North and West branches of the Susquehanna Rivers

The Priestley property, which was purchased in 1794 at a total cost of £500 (£ 57,500 in 2025) from Reuben Haines, who had secured the patent to the land for Northumberland, comprised four lots of the original village plan (numbers 29–32). Currently, the house and grounds occupy 1 acre (4,000 m^{2}) at 472 Priestley Avenue. (The address of the house was originally "North Way", but the street was later renamed in honor of Joseph Priestley.) This street forms the northwest boundary of the property; the other boundaries are Hanover Avenue to the northeast, Wallis Street to the southwest, and the North Shore Railroad to the southeast.

A baseball field is located beyond the railroad line; beyond that lies the Susquehanna River, which was the original southeastern boundary of the property. The confluence of the West Branch Susquehanna River with the main (or North) branch of the Susquehanna is a short distance southwest of the property, which is at an elevation of 456 feet (139 m).

The property's original area was 2 acres (8,000 m^{2}), but this was reduced by about half around 1830 when the Pennsylvania Canal (North Branch Division) was dug through the house's front yard, between the house and river. On May 31, 1860, the Lackawanna and Bloomsburg Railroad opened with a train from Danville. This was the second railroad track in Northumberland, and ran behind the house.

The canal closed in 1902 and was later filled in. The modern railroad line approximates the canal's course through the front yard; the track behind the house no longer exists.

== Priestleys in America ==
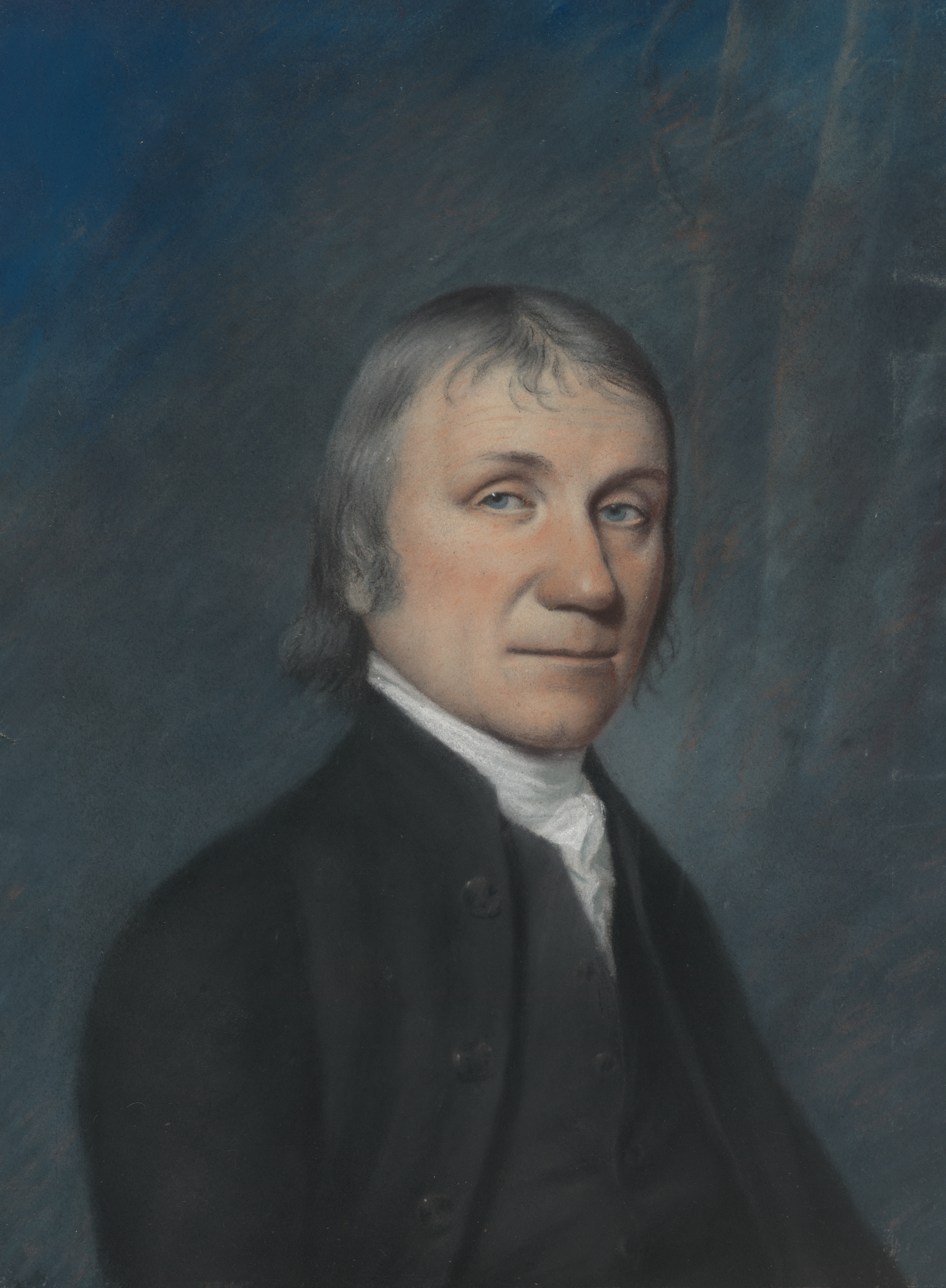
Joseph Priestley, painted by James Sharples, c. 1797

=== Emigration to Northumberland ===
The last three years the Priestleys spent in Britain were a time of political upheaval. During the Birmingham Riots of 1791, which began on the second anniversary of the storming of the Bastille in the wake of the conservative British reaction against the French Revolution, the Priestleys' home, Joseph's church, and the homes of many other religious Dissenters were burned. The Priestleys fled Birmingham and attempted to live in London, but could not escape the political turmoil.

In 1794, they joined the tide of 10,000 emigrants who moved to America during the largest emigration from Europe to America until the end of the Napoleonic Wars. The Priestleys left Britain at the beginning of April on the Samson, and arrived in New York City on June 4, 1794.

Two of their three sons, Joseph, Jr. (eldest) and Harry (youngest), had already emigrated to the United States in August 1793, along with Joseph Priestley's friend, the radical activist Thomas Cooper. Their middle son, William, had moved to America from France, probably early in 1793, following the September massacres of the previous year.

Although Europeans knew Priestley best as a scientist (he had published his paper on the discovery oxygen gas in 1774), Americans knew him best as a defender of religious freedom and as an advocate for American independence. Immediately upon his arrival, he was fêted by various political factions vying to gain his support. Priestley declined their entreaties, however, hoping to avoid the political discord that had embroiled him in Britain. He wrote to John Adams that he "made it a rule to take no part whatever in the politics of a country in which I am a stranger, and in which I only wish to live undisturbed". (Priestley never became a citizen of the United States.) He also turned down an opportunity to teach chemistry at the University of Pennsylvania at this time.

On their way to Northumberland, the Priestleys stopped in Philadelphia, where Joseph delivered a series of sermons that helped promote the spread of Unitarianism. According to J. D. Bowers, who studied Priestley's influence on Unitarianism in America, "[f]or a decade Priestley served as the inspiration and leading force in the spread of Unitarianism in America and the formation of numerous societies that followed his teachings on congregational formation, the education of youth, lay preaching, and espousing one's faith in the presence of opposition from (and to) both the Protestant majority and a competing liberal faction." Through Priestley's influence, at least twelve congregations were founded in Maine, Massachusetts, New York, Vermont, Pennsylvania, Virginia, and Kentucky, including the First Unitarian Church of Philadelphia and Northumberland's Unitarian Universalist Congregation of the Susquehanna Valley.

When he preached, Unitarians and non-Unitarians flocked to hear him and his sermons were published throughout the country. During his years in America, Priestley became increasingly convinced that the Millennium was approaching. His close study of the Bible, together with the happenings in France, persuaded him that he would see Christ's return.

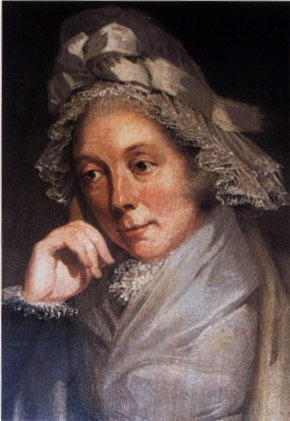
Mary Priestley, who designed the house, by Carl Frederik von Breda (1793)

While Priestley enjoyed preaching in Philadelphia, he could not afford the expense of living there; he also disliked the city's Quakers, who he believed were too opulent, and feared the yellow fever epidemic that had recently decimated the city.

He considered settling in Germantown, which had better access to transportation and communication than Northumberland, but his wife preferred the country and wanted to be near her sons. Priestly then debated about splitting his time between Northumberland and Philadelphia, but soon realized this plan was impractical. Determined to ensure the future economic stability of his family, he bought land and settled in Northumberland by July 1794, which was "five days of rough travel" north of Philadelphia. They both hoped that, in time, their new community would grow.

=== Settling in ===
Priestley yearned for a more cosmopolitan community than Northumberland provided, writing to his sister that it was "seemingly almost out of the world" and complaining that he had to wait a week for news. He wrote to his friend John Vaughan: "We know but little more than we did when we left you of European affairs."

During the winter of 1794–1795, Priestley wrote to friends that his situation was very "distant from my original views" and "my time here is far from passing so agreeably as it did in England", yet he was "very thankful for such an asylum" and he attempted "to make the best of my situation". In his letters to friends back in Britain, Priestley consistently referred to himself as an exile and to England as his real home.

His wife was happier with the couple's situation and wrote to William Vaughan: "I am happy and thankful to meet with so sweet a situation and so peaceful a retreat as the place I now write from. Dr. Priestley also likes it and of his own choice intends to settle here, which is more than I hoped for at the time we came up...This country is very delightful, the prospects of wood and water more beautiful than I have ever seen before and the people plain and decent in their manners."

Priestley's son, Joseph Priestley Jr., was a leading member of a consortium that purchased 300,000 acres (1,200 km^{2}) of land along Loyalsock Creek (between the North and West Branches of the Susquehanna River). Shortly thereafter, Thomas Cooper, a friend of Joseph Priestley's, published a pamphlet in Britain titled Some Information Respecting America, meant to encourage others to settle in Pennsylvania and offering instructions on how to do so. It detailed a clear plan for establishing and financing a settlement. The French translation, Renseignemens sur l'Amérique, was, according to one scholar, "carefully phrased in legal terminology" and "lucidly outline[d] an ambitious financial venture". However, it is unclear whether Cooper's scheme was related to the lands that the younger Priestleys had purchased.

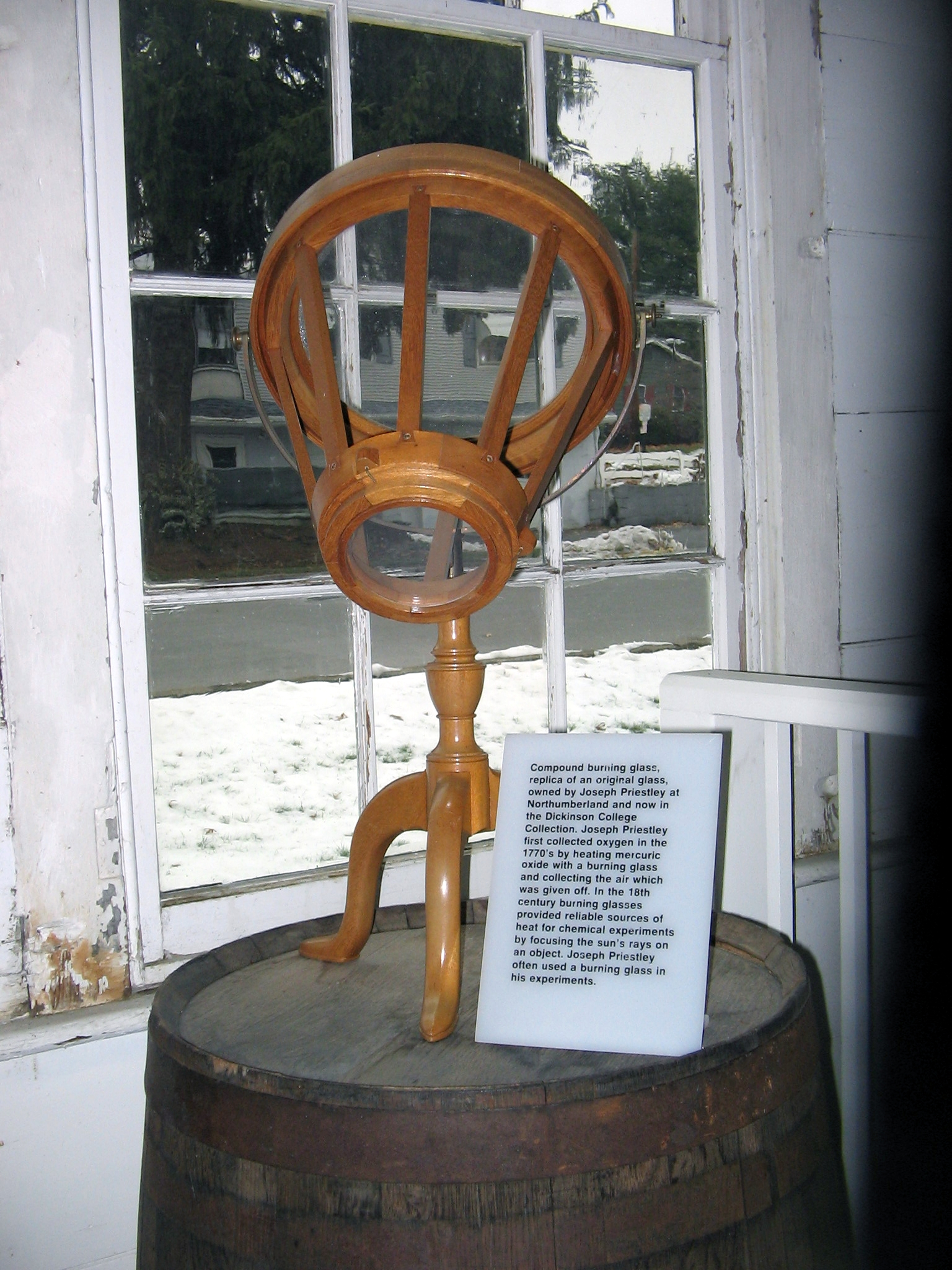
A replica (on a smaller scale) of the burning lens owned by Priestley

Apparently technically unrelated to either of these schemes, but influenced by Cooper's, poets Samuel Taylor Coleridge and William Wordsworth, full of idealism and angered at Priestley's treatment in Birmingham, intended to emigrate to America and establish a utopian community which they called "Pantisocracy" (derived from the Greek for "equal rule of all"). They assembled twelve couples who were interested not only in demanding physical labor but also in a life of the mind, but none of them had enough money to embark on the project, which required much capital. Therefore, the poets undertook a lecture tour of England to raise funds; however, they never generated enough money and never emigrated. The utopia was not built and few immigrants arrived in Northumberland as a result of Cooper's schemes.

After the failure of Cooper's endeavor, Priestley attempted to convince other friends to move to Northumberland, particularly those he had made in America, but to no avail. Priestley wrote in his Memoirs that "the settlement was given up, but being here, and my wife and myself liking the place, I have determined to take up my residence here, though subject to many disadvantages. Philadelphia was excessively expensive, and this a comparatively cheap place; and my sons, settling in the neighborhood, will be less exposed to temptation, and more likely to form habits of sobriety and industry."

=== Last years ===
Priestley's attempts to avoid political controversy in the United States failed. In 1794, the journalist William Cobbett published Observations on the Emigration of Dr. Joseph Priestley, which falsely accused Priestley of stirring up rebellion in Britain, and attempted to undermine his scientific credibility. His political fortunes took an even worse turn when Cobbett obtained a set of letters sent to Priestley by the radical printer John Hurford Stone and the liberal novelist Helen Maria Williams. Cobbett published the letters in his newspaper, asserting that Priestley and his friends were fomenting a revolution. Priestley was eventually forced to defend himself in print.

Family matters also made Priestley's time in America difficult. His youngest son Harry died on December 11, 1795, probably of malaria. Mary Priestley died on September 17, 1796; she was already ill and never fully recovered after the shock of her son's death. On September 19 of that year Joseph wrote: "This day I bury my wife....she had taken much thought in planning the new house and now that it is far advanced and promises to be everything she wished, she is removed to another." After dinner on Monday 14 April 1800, various members of Priestley's household fell ill, with symptoms of food poisoning, which prompted the Reading Advertiser to falsely accuse Priestley's son William, of trying to poison them with arsenic.

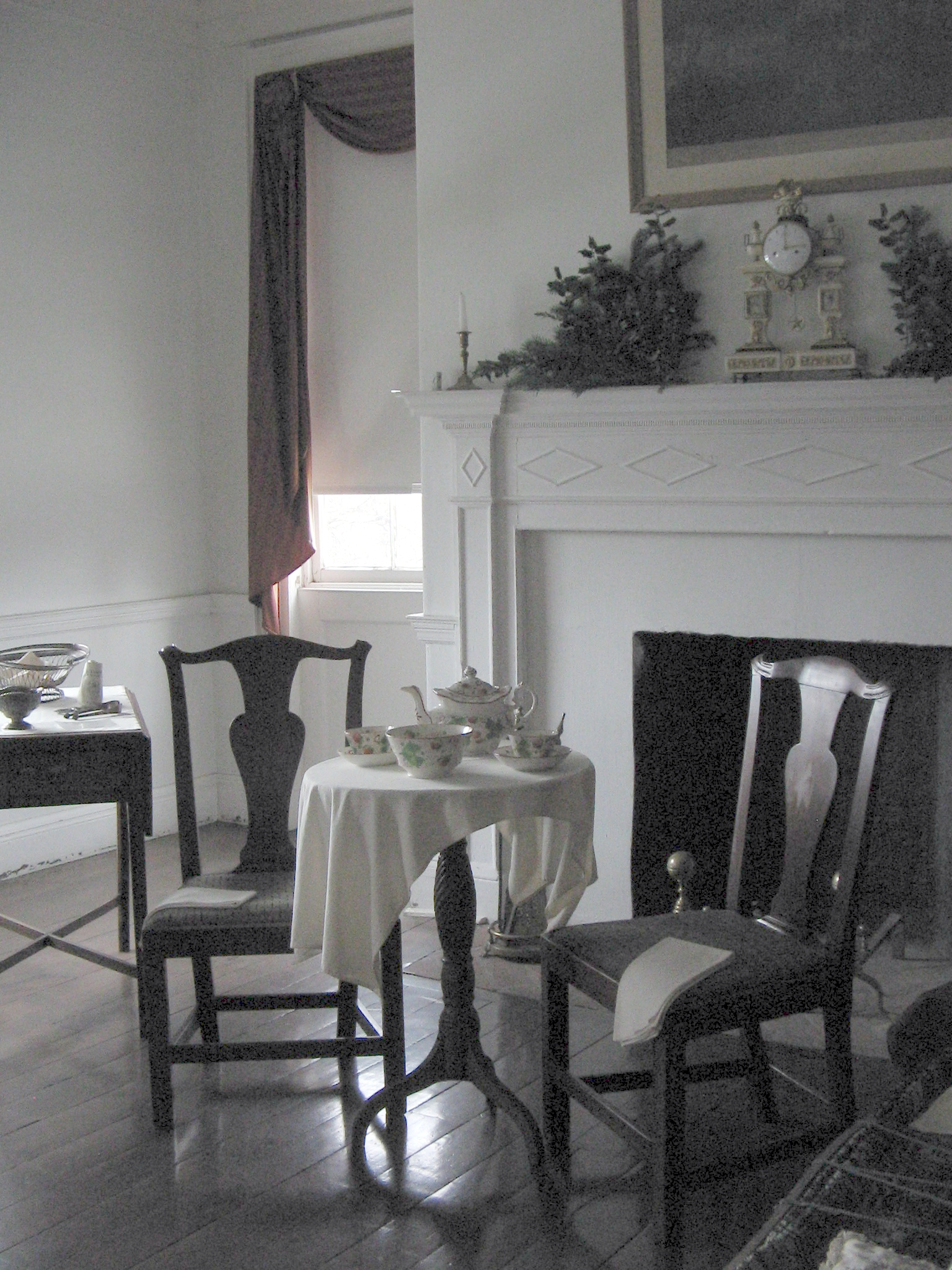
Bedroom in the Priestley home, with the couple's china tea set, mantel clock, and chairs

Priestley continued the educational projects that had been important to him throughout his life, helping to establish a "Northumberland Academy" and donating his library to the fledgling institution. He exchanged letters regarding the proper structure of a university with Thomas Jefferson, who used the advice when founding the University of Virginia. Jefferson and Priestley became close and when he had completed his General History of the Christian Church, he dedicated it to President Jefferson, writing that "it is now only that I can say I see nothing to fear from the hand of power, the government under which I live being for the first time truly favourable to me." Of all of the religious works Priestley published in the United States, and there were many, it was his four-volume General History that was the most important. Stretching from 475 CE to Priestley's present, he tracked and explained what he saw as the history of Christianity and its "corruptions", referencing his own An History of the Corruptions of Christianity (1772–74). However, he ended it by praising American religious toleration.

Priestley attempted to continue his scientific investigations in America with the support of the American Philosophical Association. However, he was hampered by lack of news from Europe; unaware of the latest scientific developments, Priestley was no longer on the forefront of discovery. Although the majority of his publications focused on defending the outmoded phlogiston theory against the "new chemistry", he also did some original work on spontaneous generation and dreams. As Robert Schofield, Priestley's major modern biographer, explains:

Priestley published more scientific items during his decade in the United States than during all his years in England: some 45 papers, not counting reprintings, and four pamphlets, not counting subsequent editions, but in general his science was now anticlimactic. Few of his papers contributed anything significantly new to the field of chemistry; most were committed to combatting the new chemistry.

Despite Priestley's reduced scientific importance, he stimulated an interest in chemistry in America.

By 1801, Priestley had become so ill that he could no longer write or experiment effectively. On February 3, 1804, Joseph started a last experiment in his lab but was too weak to continue it. He went to a bed in his library, where he died three days later. He was buried in nearby Riverview Cemetery in Northumberland. Priestley's epitaph reads:

Return unto thy rest, O my soul, for the
Lord hath dealt bountifully with thee.
I will lay me down in peace and sleep till
I awake in the morning of the resurrection.

== Architecture and landscaping ==
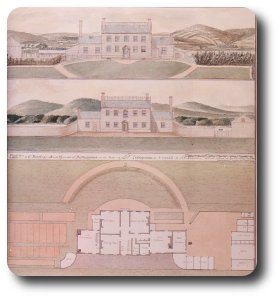
T. Lambourne's drawing of the Joseph Priestley house (c. 1800) was discovered in 1983 by Pennsylvania Historical and Museum Commission researchers.

Joseph and Mary lived with their son Joseph, Jr. and his family in a small house while theirs was being built. Mary Priestley was primarily responsible for the design of the couple's new home and her family inheritance may have helped finance it, but she died before it was completed. By 1797, Joseph's laboratory was completed—the first part of the home to be finished. It was the first laboratory that "he had designed, built, and outfitted entirely himself" and was probably the first "scientifically-equipped laboratory" in the United States. Joseph continued his scientific and scholarly work in his new laboratory, identifying carbon monoxide (which he called "heavy inflammable air"). In 1798 Joseph Jr., his wife, and their children moved into the new house with Joseph Priestley. The house also held Priestley's library, which contained about 1600 volumes by his death in 1804 and was one of the largest in America at the time. The Priestley family held Unitarian church services in the drawing room and Joseph educated a group of young men until the local Northumberland Academy that he helped found was completed.

The house proper was completed in 1798, with a Mr. Jones of Northumberland employed acting as master carpenter. Built in an 18th-century Georgian style, the "balance and symmetry" of the architecture signaled "subdued elegance". The house was accented with Federalist highlights, such as "the fanlights over the doors and the balustrades on the rooftop belvedere and main staircase", marking it as distinctly American. Douglas R. McMinn, in the National Register of Historic Places nomination for the Northumberland Historic District, calls it a "mansion" that is "probably the finest example of the Federal style in the region". As William N. Richardson, the site administrator for the Joseph Priestley House in the 1990s, notes, Priestley's American home did not resemble his "high-style Georgian town house" that was destroyed in Birmingham; rather, it was "plain" and built in the "American vernacular".

The house has a two-and-half story central section, which is 48 feet (14.6 m) by 43 feet (13.1 m), and two one-story wings on the north and south sides that are each 22 feet (6.7 m) by 21 feet (6.4 m). The first and second floors have a total area of 5,052 square feet (469 m^{2}). The north wing was the laboratory and the south wing (which had an attached woodshed) was the summer kitchen. The cellar, first, and second floors of the central section are each divided into four rooms, with a central hall on the first and second floors; the first floor also has an intersecting hall that leads to the laboratory. The attic has three rooms for servants and a larger room for storage. A paint analysis done in 1994 revealed that the house had no wall paper initially and that the walls and woodwork were painted "a brilliant white".

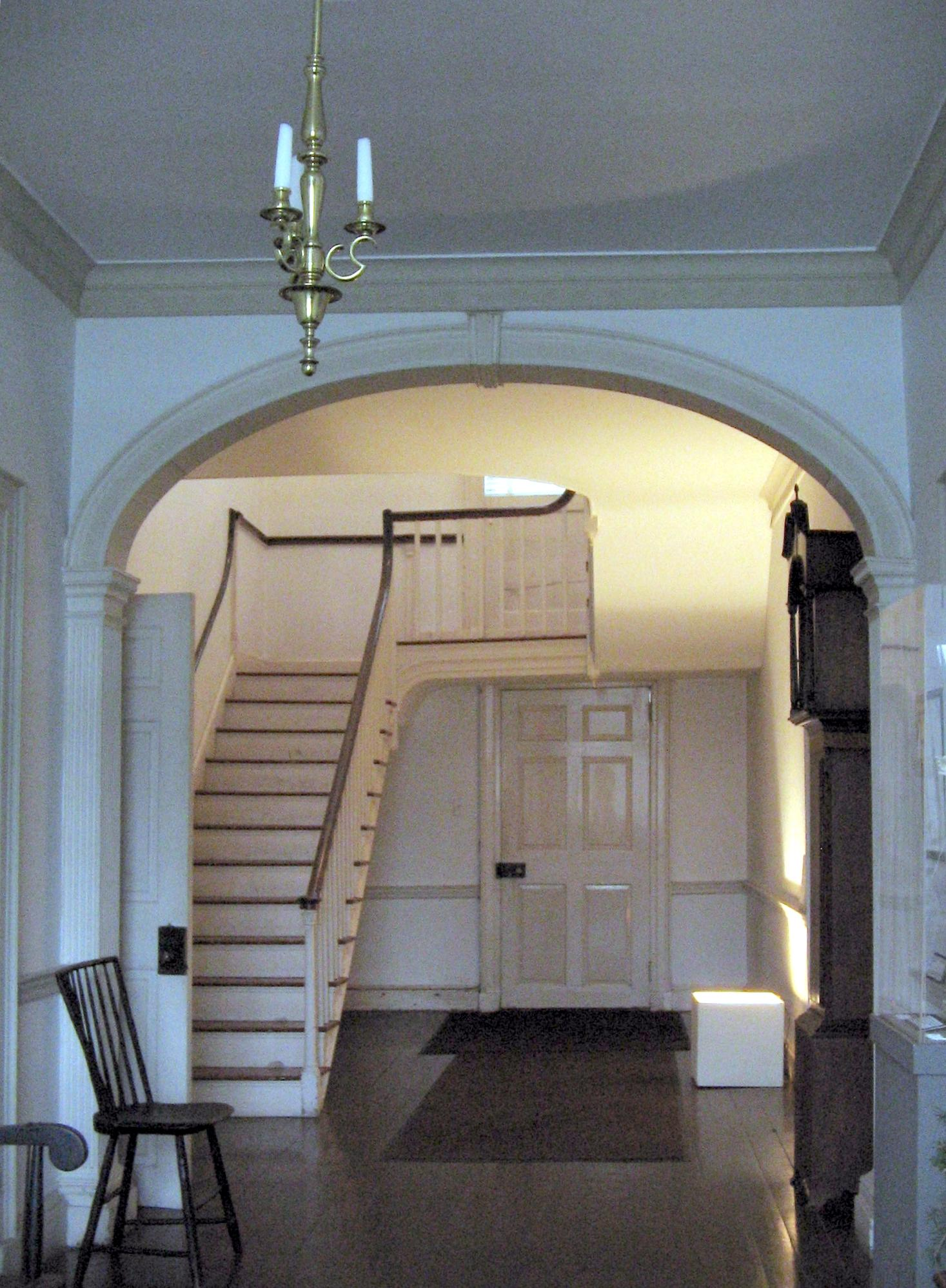
Lack of skilled craftsmen forced accommodations, like this stairwell probably built from a kit and one step short

The house is a frame structure, covered with white wooden clapboards, anchored to a stone foundation. The Priestleys built their home out of wood, dried in trenches on the site, because no stone or brick was available in the area. Joseph wrote a detailed description of the drying process, concluding: "A house constructed with such boards I prefer to one of brick and stone". This may have prompted journalist William Cobbett to caustically label the house a "shed" in one of his political tirades against Joseph. The central section of the house has a slate gable roof with a railing-enclosed deck. The house has "three internal gable end chimneys, one for the main kitchen", and one each at the north and south ends of the central section.

The house faces the Susquehanna River, and both the front and rear doors are "sheltered by a shallow portico". A circular carriage drive (originally gravel, now concrete) leads to the front door, which also has a fanlight. There are five windows on the second floor on both the front and rear sides of the house, with a dentil cornice above both sets of windows. The external details on the house also include a "frieze board with triglyphs".

Originally, delightful panoramic views were visible from the home. It was built facing the Susquehanna River so that visitors arriving by boat could be welcomed by the family and because conventional 18th-century aesthetic theory held that countryscapes were more beautiful than townscapes. Priestley built a high wall blocking the view of Northumberland and added a belvedere to the top of his house to more easily survey the landscape. His plantings were "a much scaled-down version of the beautiful gardens" at Bowood, the estate of his former employer Lord Shelburne.

The lack of skilled craftspeople in Northumberland made the construction of the house difficult. For example, Richardson speculates that the main staircase was assembled from a kit. It is one step too short for the Northumberland hallway, but no extra step was added to finish off the symmetry of the stairwell, suggesting a dearth of skilled labor.

== Ownership and museum ==
After the deaths of Mary and Joseph Priestley, Joseph Priestley, Jr. and his wife, Elizabeth Ryland, continued to live in the house until 1811, at which time they emigrated to Britain and sold the home. The house passed through various hands during the 19th century. Judge Seth Chapman purchased the house from Joseph Priestley Jr. on May 13, 1815, for US$6,250 ($ 109,900 in 2025). Chapman died on December 4, 1835, and Rev. James Kay, pastor of the Northumberland Unitarian congregation, and his family lived in the house next. James Kay died on September 22, 1847, and his widow probably lived in the house until her October 2, 1850 death. Charles H. Kay, son of James, had purchased the house in 1845, a few years before his parents' deaths. In April 1865 Charles Kay's children sold the house to Henry R. Campbell for $2,775 ($ 58,400 in 2025). Florence Bingham purchased the house from Campbell for $5,679.53 on January 18, 1868 ($ 137,400 in 2025), and Bingham's heirs sold it to T. Hugh Johnson for $2,000 on October 7, 1882 ($ 66,700 in 2025). Kate Scott bought the house for $3,000 on April 11, 1888 ($ 107,500 in 2025). In 1911 the last private resident moved out of the house, and it was sublet to the Pennsylvania Railroad for its workers (a large railroad yard was built in Northumberland at this time). This led to a general decline in the house and its grounds.

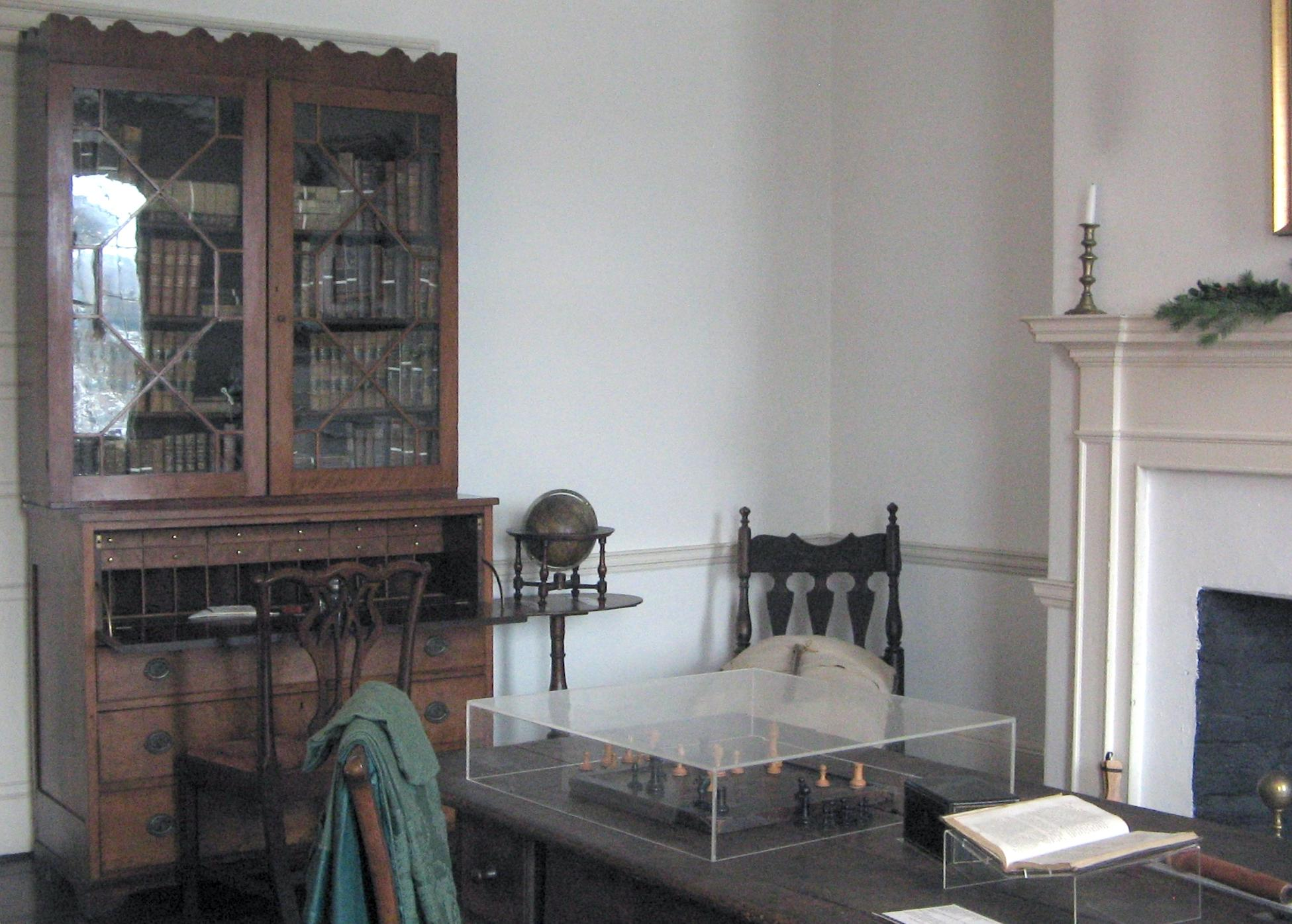
Priestley's library, with his chess set and globe

Professor George Gilbert Pond was the first person to make a significant effort to establish a permanent Priestley museum at the Priestley House. After raising sufficient funds, he managed to purchase the home at auction for $6,000 from Scott's heirs on November 24, 1919 ($ 111,400 in 2025). Pond believed that construction of a new railroad line would destroy the house, and so intended to move it to Pennsylvania State College (now Pennsylvania State University). However, he died on May 20, 1920, before this plan could be enacted; the planned rail line was never built and the house proved too fragile to move. The college established a memorial fund in Pond's honor and retained the house as a museum, although Pond's children did not formally transfer the house to the college until April 14, 1932. Some restoration of the house was done in the 1920s, and a small, brick building—intended as a fireproof museum for Priestley's books and scientific apparatus—was built on the grounds and dedicated to Pond's memory in 1926. In 1941 the state legislature tried to have the State Historical Commission administer the house as a museum, but Governor Arthur James vetoed the plan for lack of funding.

On December 14, 1955, the college donated the house to the borough of Northumberland. From 1955 to 1959 the house served as both the borough hall for Northumberland and as a museum. The house proved too costly for the borough to maintain, and was acquired by the Commonwealth of Pennsylvania in 1961. Eventually, in 1968 the Pennsylvania Historical and Museum Commission (PHMC) began restoring it and in October 1970 the museum was opened to the public. The renovations included a restoration of the laboratory, a removal of ornamentation added in the Victorian era, a return of doorways to their original locations, and a return of the shutters "to their original locations inside the windows". The PHMC was supported by "The Friends of the Joseph Priestley House" (FJPH), who help with the visitor center, tours, special events, and outreach, as well as with clerical and museum work.

Between 1998 and 1999 a renovation that was "one of the most extensive changes in the homestead's history" set out to "restore the grounds around the house to exactly the way it was when Priestley lived" there. This involved reconstructing exact replicas of the original carriage barn, hog sties, horse stalls, gardens, fences, and even the privy. These structures were based on T. Lambourne's drawings of the house and grounds that had been discovered in 1983, other records, and excavations. Priestley left no written description of his laboratory, but much is known of his experiments and late-18th-century laboratories. Extensive research on the laboratory within the house was completed in 1996, including excavations that revealed two underground ovens, as well as evidence of a primitive fume hood. The 1998 renovations also included work to restore the laboratory to a condition as close to its original state as possible.

After Joseph's death, Thomas Cooper sold a collection of some of his friend's apparatus and other personal belongings to Dickinson College in Carlisle, which exhibits it each year when presenting the school's Priestley Award to a scientist who makes "discoveries which contribute to the welfare of mankind". The house lost its original furnishings when Joseph Jr. and his family moved back to England. Since it is not known what was originally in the home, it is furnished and decorated with artifacts donated by descendants of the Priestleys and with ones similar to those listed in Priestley's testament of what was lost in the fire at his Birmingham home. A number of items that belonged to Joseph and Mary during their lives both in Britain and America are on display throughout the house, including Joseph's balance scales and microscope. Portraits, prints, maps, charts, and books have been carefully selected to replicate the Priestleys' holdings. A bedroom on the second floor is dedicated to an exploration of the life of an 18th-century woman.

On January 12, 1965, the Joseph Priestley House was designated a National Historic Landmark and it was added to the National Register of Historic Places (NRHP) on October 15, 1966. On August 1, 1994, the American Chemical Society named it the second National Historic Chemical Landmark; the dedication ceremony was attended by 75 Priestley descendants. In 1988, the Northumberland Historic District, including the Priestley House (which it describes as a "gem" and one of the finest Federal style buildings in central Pennsylvania), was listed on the NRHP. The district includes one other building already on the NRHP: the Priestley-Forsyth Memorial Library, which was built as an inn around 1820 and was owned by a great-grandson of the Priestleys in the 1880s. Today it serves as Northumberland's public library. The Joseph Priestley Memorial Chapel, which is a contributing structure in the historic district, was built in 1834 by his grandson, and is home to a Unitarian Universalist congregation that considers Priestley its founder.

Under the PHMC, the museum was open ten months a year, closing between early January and early March. In 2007 and 2008 the number of visitors held steady after recent declines. According to the PHMC, in fiscal 2007–08 "total visitation ... was 1,705 with a paid visitation of 1,100 generating $4,125 in program revenue and 2,406 recreational and non-ticketed visitors". The fiscal 2006–07 operations budget for the house and its two full-time staff was $142,901, with $6,900 (five percent) coming from FJPH and the rest from the state of Pennsylvania.

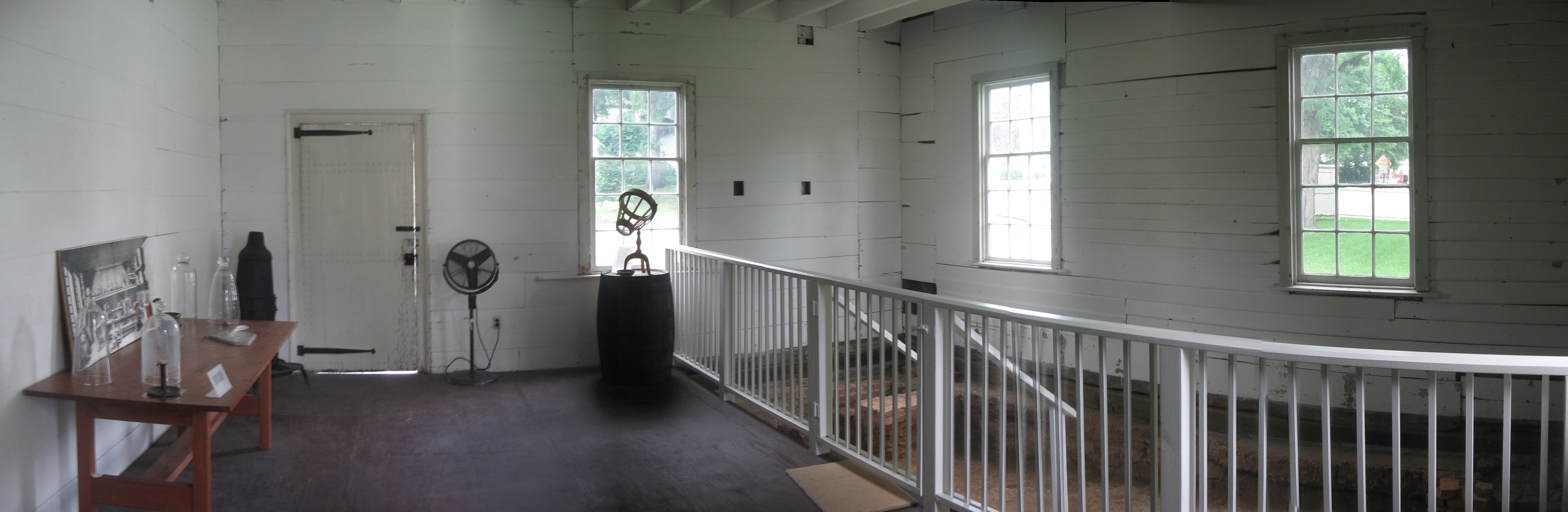
Panoramic view of the interior of Priestley's lab in June, 2009

On March 4, 2009, the PHMC released a report examining its 22 museums and historic sites and recommended discontinuing operations at six, including the Joseph Priestley House. The proposed closure of the Priestley House was based on "low visitation and limited potential for growth". Despite public meetings, protest letters, and a general "public outcry" against closure, on August 14, 2009, the state closed the Priestley House and three other PHMC museums indefinitely due to a lack of funding as part of an ongoing budget crisis. The sole remaining state employee at Priestley House was furloughed. That month the Friends of the Joseph Priestley House submitted a plan to the PHMC to operate the house on weekends from May to October with staffing provided by volunteers. The plan depended both on acquiring insurance for the volunteers, the house, and its contents, and on the state passing a budget.

On September 24, 2009, the PHMC and officers of the FJPH signed an agreement to reopen the museum on Saturday and Sunday afternoons. The house reopened on October 3, with volunteer staffing from the FJPH. The agreement can be renewed annually and lets FJPH "schedule programs, set fees and be in charge of all the business aspects of running the site". On November 1, there was a "grand reopening celebration" at the house with a dozen costumed volunteer guides and chemical demonstrations in Priestley's laboratory. On November 7, 2010, the brick Pond building was rededicated after an $85,000 renovation, as part of the museum's annual "Fall Heritage Day". The restoration, which had been planned for years, was paid for by private donors and included "handicapped accessibility, new roofing, heating and air-conditioning and new interior walls, ceilings and lighting". The FJPH plan to install a timeline of Priestley's scientific work and times in the Pond building, as well as a video about his laboratory techniques and impact today.

=== American Chemical Society ===
The American Chemical Society (ACS) has used the Joseph Priestley House as a place to mark special celebrations. On July 31 and August 1, 1874, "seventy-seven chemists made a pilgrimage to the site to celebrate the centennial of chemistry". The date was chosen to mark the hundredth anniversary of Priestley's experiment producing oxygen by heating mercuric oxide with a magnifying lens and sunlight. These chemists came from 15 US states and the District of Columbia, Canada, and England, and their meeting at the house and a local school "is now recognized as the first National Chemistry Congress, and many ACS historians believe it led to ACS's formation two years later on April 6, 1876". On September 5, 1926, about 500 ACS members met again at the home to dedicate the small brick museum and to celebrate the meeting 50 years earlier (two survivors of that first meeting were present).

Representatives of the ACS were present at the October 1970 dedication of the house as a museum. On April 25, 1974, around 400 chemists from the ACS Middle Atlantic Regional Meeting in Scranton came to visit the home. The Priestley Medal, the highest and oldest honor awarded by the ACS, was awarded to Paul Flory at the house that day. (A replica of the Priestley Medal is on display at the house.) On August 1, 1974—what has been labeled the bicentennial of the discovery of oxygen—over 500 chemists attending the third Biennial Conference on Chemical Education at State College traveled to the house to celebrate "Oxygen Day". In October 1976, the ACS celebrated its own centennial with a celebration in Northumberland. A 100-plus piece replica of Priestley's laboratory equipment, made by universities, corporations, and the Smithsonian Institution, was presented to the house for display. On April 13, 1983, ACS President Fred Basolo spoke at the house to celebrate Priestley's 250th birthday and as part of a first day of issue ceremony for the United States Postal Service's Joseph Priestley commemorative stamp. In 2001 the ACS again met at the house to celebrate the 125th anniversary of the society, and reenacted parts of the 1874 and 1926 celebrations, including a march to Priestley's grave, at which each participant left a red rose.

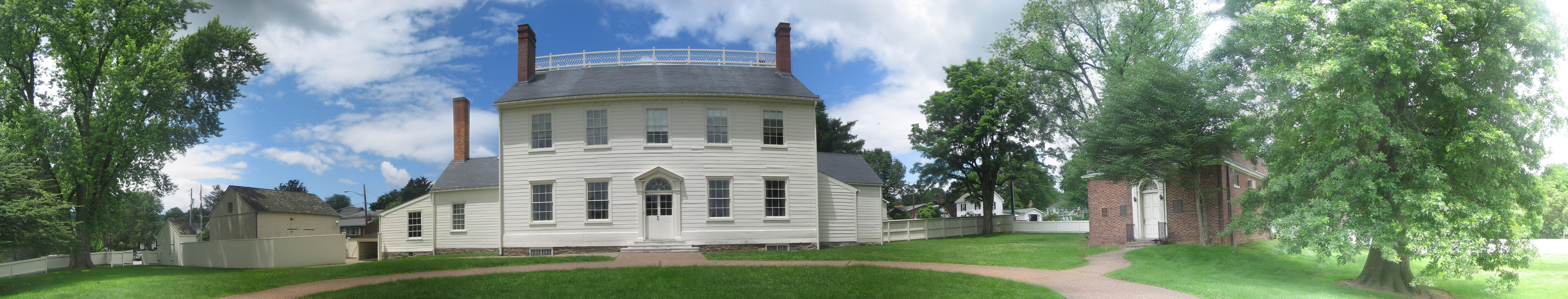
Panorama of front side of the Joseph Priestley House, facing the Susquehanna River (southeast). Structures from left to right are: Privy, Carriage Barn (now Visitors Center), wood sheds (all reconstructed), Summer Kitchen (attached to Kitchen), Kitchen wing, Main House, passage to Laboratory, Laboratory wing, and Pond Museum (built in 1926 of brick). Note circular driveway in foreground.

== Bibliography ==
- —. ""Detail Report: Joseph Priestley House"." Geographic Names Information System, United States Geological Survey. (1 October 1992). Retrieved 11 January 2008.
- —. "Joseph Priestley Celebration". Dickinson College. Retrieved 10 January 2008.
- —. "Joseph Priestley House". National Register of Historic Places Searchable Database Archived 2013-02-15 at the Wayback Machine. NRHP Reference #66000673. United States National Park Service. Retrieved 11 November 2007.
- —. "Joseph Priestley House National Historic Landmark Summary Listing". United States National Park Service. Retrieved 11 November 2007.
- —. "Priestley Chapel History: The Beginning". News and Events. Priestley Chapel Associates. 2007. Retrieved 27 January 2008.
- —. "Priestley House Museum to hold re-opening celebration". Williamsport Sun Gazette (26 October 2009). Retrieved 1 November 2009.
- —. "Planning Our Future: Sustainability Committee Final Report". Pennsylvania Historical and Museum Commission, Bureau of Historic Sites and Museums. 4 March 2009. Retrieved 3 April 2009.
- Bashore, Andrea. "Message From The Director" Postings From Priestley House: Newsletter of The Friends of Joseph Priestley House 42 (Fall 2008): 2–3. Retrieved 2 April 2009.
- Bell, Herbert C. "Northumberland". History of Northumberland County, Pennsylvania, Including its Aboriginal History; the Colonial and Revolutionary Periods; Early Settlement and Subsequent Growth; Political Organization; Agricultural, Mining, and Manufacturing Interests; Internal Improvements; Religious, Educational, Social, and Military History; Sketches of its Boroughs, Villages, and Townships; Portraits and Biographies of Pioneers and Representative Citizens, etc.. Chicago: Brown, Runk & Co., 1891. Retrieved 4 November 2007.
- Bowers, J. D. Joseph Priestley and English Unitarianism in America. University Park: Pennsylvania State University Press, 2007. ISBN 0-271-02951-X.
- Cooper, Thomas. Renseignemens sur l'Amérique. Paris: Chez Maradan, An IIIe. 1795. OCLC 2077867.
- Dandes, Rick. "Heritage: Joseph Priestley House may close: Commission blames low attendance, costs." The Daily Item (19 March 2009). Retrieved 3 April 2009.
- Garrett, Clarke. "Priestley's Religion". Joseph Priestley in America, 1794–1804. Ed. Peter M. Lukehart. Carlisle, PA: Trout Gallery, Dickinson College, 1994.
- Garrett, Clarke. "Which Cooper? The Site of Coleridge's Utopia on the Susquehanna". John and Mary's Journal 5 (1979): 17–28.
- Glazer, Mike. "Extensive Changes Underway at Priestley House: Renovations will Recall the Past". Williamsport Sun Gazette (13 December 1998): B1, B7.
- Glazer, Mike. "Scientist Discovered Oxygen". Williamsport Sun Gazette (13 December 1998): B1.
- Graham, Jenny. Revolutionary in Exile: The Emigration of Joseph Priestley to America, 1794–1804. Transactions of the American Philosophical Society 85 (1995). ISBN 0-87169-852-8.
- Greenwood, Richard. "National Register of Historic Places Inventory-Nomination: Joseph Priestley House" (PDF). 1974. United States National Park Service. Retrieved 11 November 2007.
- Hirsch, Alison Duncan. Joseph Priestley House: Pennsylvania Trail of History Guide. Mechanicsburg, PA: Stackpole Books, 2003. ISBN 0-8117-2629-0.
- Hoffmann, Roald. "Letter to Barbara Franco, Executive Director, Pennsylvania Historical and Museum Commission". 6 May 2009. Retrieved 17 August 2009.
- Kelley, Maurice W. "Thomas Cooper and Pantisocracy". Modern Language Notes (April 1930): 218–20.
- Kieft, Lester. Joseph Priestley and the Priestley House. 2nd ed. Northumberland, PA: The Friends of the Joseph Priestley House, 2006.
- Laepple, Wayne. "State budget impasse closes historic Joseph Priestley House" The Daily Item (15 August 2009). Retrieved 17 August 2009.
- Laepple, Wayne. "Friends group to reopen Priestley House" The Daily Item (25 September 2009). Retrieved 1 November 2009.
- MacDermott, Kevin. "Celebrating Chemistry History". Chemical & Engineering News. 79.45 (2001): 43–44. Retrieved 3 November 2007.
- McMinn, Douglas R. "National Register of Historic Places Registration: Northumberland Historic District" (PDF). 17 March 1988. United States National Park Service. Retrieved 15 November 2007.
- Park, Mary Cathryne. "Joseph Priestley and the Problem of Pantisocracy". Proceedings of the Delaware County Institute of Science 11 (1947): 1–60.
- Paul, E. Robert. "Joseph Priestley: A Scientific Virtuoso". Joseph Priestley in America, 1794–1804. Ed. Peter M. Lukehart. Carlisle, PA: Trout Gallery, Dickinson College, 1994.
- Rail, Tony: "William Priestley Vindicated, with a Previously Unpublished Letter", Enlightenment and Dissent, no.28 (2012), 150–195.
- Richardson, William N. "The Current Interpretation of the Joseph Priestley House". Joseph Priestley in America, 1794–1804. Ed. Peter M. Lukehart. Carlisle, PA: Trout Gallery, Dickinson College, 1994.
- Richardson, William N. "Joseph Priestley's American Home". Proceedings and Addresses of the Northumberland County Historical Society 32 (1994): 60–70.
- Rovner, Sophie L. "Priestley Museum Rededicated". Chemical & Engineering News. 88.45 (2010): 63. Retrieved 22 November 2010.
- Rujumba, Karamagi "Fort Pitt Museum, Bushy Run close due to state budget crisis". Pittsburgh Post-Gazette (14 August 2009). Retrieved 16 August 2009.
- Schofield, Robert E. The Enlightened Joseph Priestley: A Study of His Life and Work from 1773 to 1804. University Park: Pennsylvania State University Press, 2004. ISBN 0-271-02459-3.
- Schulz, William G. "Priestley House May Be Shuttered: Pennsylvania state budget cuts could cease operation of ACS Historic Chemical Landmark". Chemical & Engineering News. 87.14 (2009): 9. Retrieved 3 April 2009.
- Scott, Rob. "100 vow to help save Priestley House: Groups pursue options as July 1 closing deadline looms." The Daily Item (10 April 2009). Retrieved 12 April 2009.
- Silverman, Sharon Hernes. "Joseph Priestley: Catalyst of the Enlightenment". Pennsylvania Heritage Magazine 25.3 (1999). Retrieved 11 November 2007.
- Smith, Edgar F. Priestley in America, 1794–1804. Philadelphia: P. Blakiston's Son and Co., 1920. Retrieved 27 January 2008.
- Snyder, Dick. "Pennsylvania Adds to Its Large Catalogue Of Scenic and Historic Attractions". The New York Times (31 August 1941): XXI.
- Suplee, Curtis. "Joseph Priestley: Discoverer of Oxygen". American Chemical Society. (2004). Retrieved 5 January 2016.
- Walker, William H. "History of the Priestley House and the Movement for its Preservation". Journal of Chemical Education. 4 (1927): 150–158. Retrieved 22 November 2010.
