= Abdul Rehman (Pakistani politician) =

Pakistani politician

Member of the Gilgit-Baltistan Council
- Incumbent
- Assumed office 12 November 2021

Personal details
- Party: Pakistan Tehreek-e-Insaf (PTI)

Abdul Rehman (Urdu: عبدالرحمٰن) is a Pakistani politician who is currently serving as a member of the Gilgit-Baltistan Council since 12 November 2021. He belongs to Pakistan Tehreek-e-Insaf (PTI).
