= Hashmatullah Khan =

Pakistani politician

- حشمت اللّٰہ خان

Member of the Gilgit-Baltistan Council
- Incumbent
- Assumed office 12 November 2021

Former President of PTI GB
- In office unknown–unknown

Central Deputy Secretary General of PTI Pakistan
- In office unknown–unknown

Member of the Central Executive Committee of PTI Pakistan
- Incumbent
- Assumed office unknown
- Preceded by: unknown

Deputy Inspector General (DIG) in Gilgit-Baltistan Police
- In office unknown–unknown

Personal details
- Born: Bunji, Astore District, Gilgit-Baltistan, Pakistan
- Party: Pakistan Tehreek-e-Insaf (PTI)
- Occupation: politician, police officer, Authore of subah Azad e Gilgit Baltistan and Shaksiyat khidmat(khawar marhoom)

Hashmatullah Khan (Urdu: حشمت اللّٰہ خان) Retired Deputy Inspector General (DIG) in Gilgit-Baltistan Police. He belongs to Bunji, Pakistan in Astore District, Gilgit-Baltistan. He is Pakistani politician Central Deputy Secretary General PTI Pakistan Member CEC PTI Pakistan Former President PTI GB who is currently serving as a member of the Gilgit-Baltistan Council since 12 November 2021. He belongs to Pakistan Tehreek-e-Insaf (PTI) since 2012.
