= Elizabeth Nesbitt =

American children's librarian and a library science educator

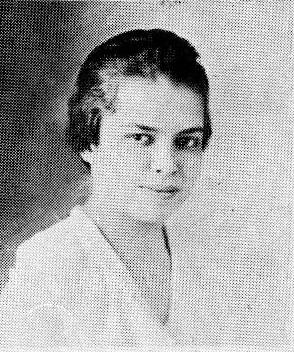
Elizabeth Nesbitt

Elizabeth Nesbitt (April 15, 1897 – August 17, 1977), also known as Betty Nesbitt, was an American children's librarian and a library science educator. She was known "internationally as an authority on children's literature", and made "strong contributions" to children's librarianship.

== Early life and education ==
Elizabeth Nesbitt was born on April 15, 1897, in Northumberland, Pennsylvania, north of Harrisburg on the Susquehanna River, United States. After completing her studies in a private school, she earned a A.B. degree from the Goucher College for women, Baltimore in 1918. She earned another bachelor's degree in library science from Carnegie Library School in 1931, and a master's degree in English from the University of Pittsburgh in 1935.

== Career ==
In 1919, her family moved from Philadelphia to Pittsburgh. She briefly worked as a teacher in a private school in Pittsburgh. She later joined as an assistant at the Carnegie Library School of Pittsburgh. In 1948, she was appointed as associate dean of the Carnegie Library School, and she held this position until her retirement in 1962. She then became a lecturer of the Graduate School of Library and Information Sciences of the University of Pittsburgh. During the summers she taught library sciences-related courses in a number of prominent higher educational institutions, including Columbia University and the University of Illinois. She was associated with a number of professional associations, such as the Pennsylvania Library Association and American Library Association.

She was also known as a storyteller.

== Publications ==
Nesbitt co-authored A Critical History of Children's Literature, which remains "a landmark publication" in the field.

== Awards and honors ==
Nesbitt received numerous awards and honors for her contributions to the field of library sciences and children's literature. These include:

- Pittsburgh's Ten Women of Talent (1955)
- Distinguished Daughter of Pennsylvania (1958)
- Distinguished Service Award (1962) by the Pennsylvania Library Association
- Beta Phi Mu Award for Distinguished Service
- Clarence Day Award (1965) by the American Library Association

In her honor, in 1976, the University of Pittsburgh named a room at the Graduate School of Library and Information Sciences the Elizabeth Nesbitt Room, which houses an important historical collection of children's books.

Nesbitt died at the age of 80 in Atlantic City, New Jersey, on August 17, 1977, of cancer.
