= Nuri (name) =

- Gender: Male given name (Arabic/Islamic, common in Turkey), male and female given name (Aramaic, Hebrew), Persian surname
- Language: Turkish, Arabic, Aramaic, Persian, Japanese, Hebrew

Origin
- Meaning: Arabic for "my light" (نوري), Aramaic for "my fire" (ܢܘܪܝ), Persian from Arabic

Other names
- Alternative spelling: Nouri, Noori, Nori, Noory

Nuri (also spelled Nouri, Noori, Nori or Noory, Arabic: نوري, Syriac: ܢܘܪܝ) is a unisex name and a surname. Notable people with the name include:

== Given name ==
- Nuri Ja'far (1914–1991), Iraqi psychologist and philosopher of education
- Nuri Badran (born 1943), Iraqi politician
- Nuri Berköz (1889–1975), Azerbaijani general
- Nuri Boytorun (1908–1988), Turkish wrestler
- Nuri Bilge Ceylan (born 1959), Turkish filmmaker
- Nuri Demirağ (1886–1957), Turkish industrialist
- Nuri Killigil (1881–1949), general in the Ottoman army
- Nuri Kino (born 1965), Swedish journalist and filmmaker
- Nouri al-Maliki (born 1950), Prime Minister of Iraq
- Nuri al-Mismari (born 1942), Libyan politician and diplomat
- Nuri Montsé (1917–1971), Argentine actress
- Nuri Ok (1942–2015), Turkish judge
- Nouri Ouznadji (born 1984), Algerian footballer
- Nuri as-Said (1888–1958), Iraqi politician
- Nuri bin Hazaa Al Shalaan (1847–1942), Arab tribe chief
- Nuri Sojliu (1870–1940), signatory of the Albanian Declaration of Independence
- Nuri Şahin (born 1988), Turkish footballer
- Nuri Şahin (volleyball player) (born 1980), Turkish volleyball player

== Surname ==
- Abdelhak Nouri (born 1997), Dutch footballer
- Abdollah Nouri, Iranian politician
- Alekhine Nouri, Filipino chess master
- Alexander Nouri (born 1979), Iranian-German football manager
- Alireza Noori, Iranian politician
- George Noory, radio talk show host
- Hossein Nuri, Iranian painter, dramaturge, and filmmaker
- Kat Nouri, Iranian-born American entrepreneur and inventor
- Michael Nouri, Lebanese-American actor
- Milad Nouri (footballer born 1986), Iranian footballer
- Milad Nouri (footballer, born 1993), Iranian footballer
- Mina Nouri (born 1951), Iranian painter
- Mohammad Nouri (footballer), Iranian footballer
- Mohammad Nouri (singer), Iranian singer
- Moshtaque Ahmad Noori, Indian Urdu short story writer and critic
- Parviz Nouri (1938–2026), Iranian movie critic, screenwriter, and director
- Pejman Nouri, Iranian footballer
- Pir Syed Muhammad Channan Shah Nuri, Islamic saint
- Sayid Abdulloh Nuri (1947–2006), leader of the Islamic Renaissance Party of Tajikistan
- Shahab Sheikh Nuri (1932–1976), Kurdish politician
- Sheikh Fazlollah Noori, Iranian cleric
- Süleyman Nuri (1895–1966), Ottoman Russian communist politician
- Vahid Nouri (born 1989), Iranian paralympic judoka
- Vivian Nouri (born 1993), known professionally as NOURI (artist), New Zealand recording artist of Kurdish descent
- Yochanan ben Nuri, Tanna of the first and second century CE

== See also ==
- Ali Akbar Nategh-Nouri, Iranian politician
- Nuri (disambiguation)
- Noori (disambiguation)
