= Gilgit-Baltistan Council =

Gilgit-Baltistan Council of the administrative territory of Pakistan

History
- Founded: 2009

Leadership
- Chairman: Prime Minister of Pakistan
- Vice-Chairman: Governor of Gilgit-Baltistan
- Seats: 6

Elections
- Last election: 2021

The Gilgit-Baltistan Council has been established as per Article 33 of Gilgit-Baltistan (Empowerment & Self Governance) Order, 2009. Its Chairman is the Prime Minister of Pakistan and the Governor of Gilgit-Baltistan is the Vice-Chairman over the six members-elected. It can legislate on 53 subjects as provided in Schedule III of the Order.

== 2010 election ==
The first Gilgit-Baltistan Council was elected on 18 March 2010, and members were sworn in on 3 April 2010. Its members were as follows:

- Amjad Hussain Azar - PPP
- Muhammad Ibrahim - PPP
- Ghulam Hussain Saleem - PPP
- Wazir Ibadat - PPP
- Saeed Afzal - IND
- Attauallah Shahab - JUI(F)

== 2016 election ==
Since the establishment of the GB Council, the election took place five years later.

- Arman Shah - PML-N
- Sultan Ali Khan - PML-N
- Muhammad Ashraf Sada - PML-N
- Wazir Ikhlaq Hussain - PML-N
- Syed Muhammad Abbas - ITP
- Saeed Afzal - IND

== 2021 election ==
Six members were elected in the 2021 GB Council election.

- Hashmatullah Khan - PTI
- Abdul Rehman - PTI
- Syed Shabia Al Hasnain - PTI
- Ahmed Ali Noori - PTI
- Muhammad Ayub Shah - PPP
- Iqbal Naseer - PML-N

== See also ==
- Ministry of Kashmir Affairs & Gilgit Baltistan
- Azad Jammu and Kashmir Council
- Gilgit-Baltistan Legislative Assembly
- Government of Gilgit-Baltistan
- Election Commission Gilgit-Baltistan
