= Priestley-Forsyth Memorial Library =

- Dr. Joseph Priestley House
- U.S. National Register of Historic Places
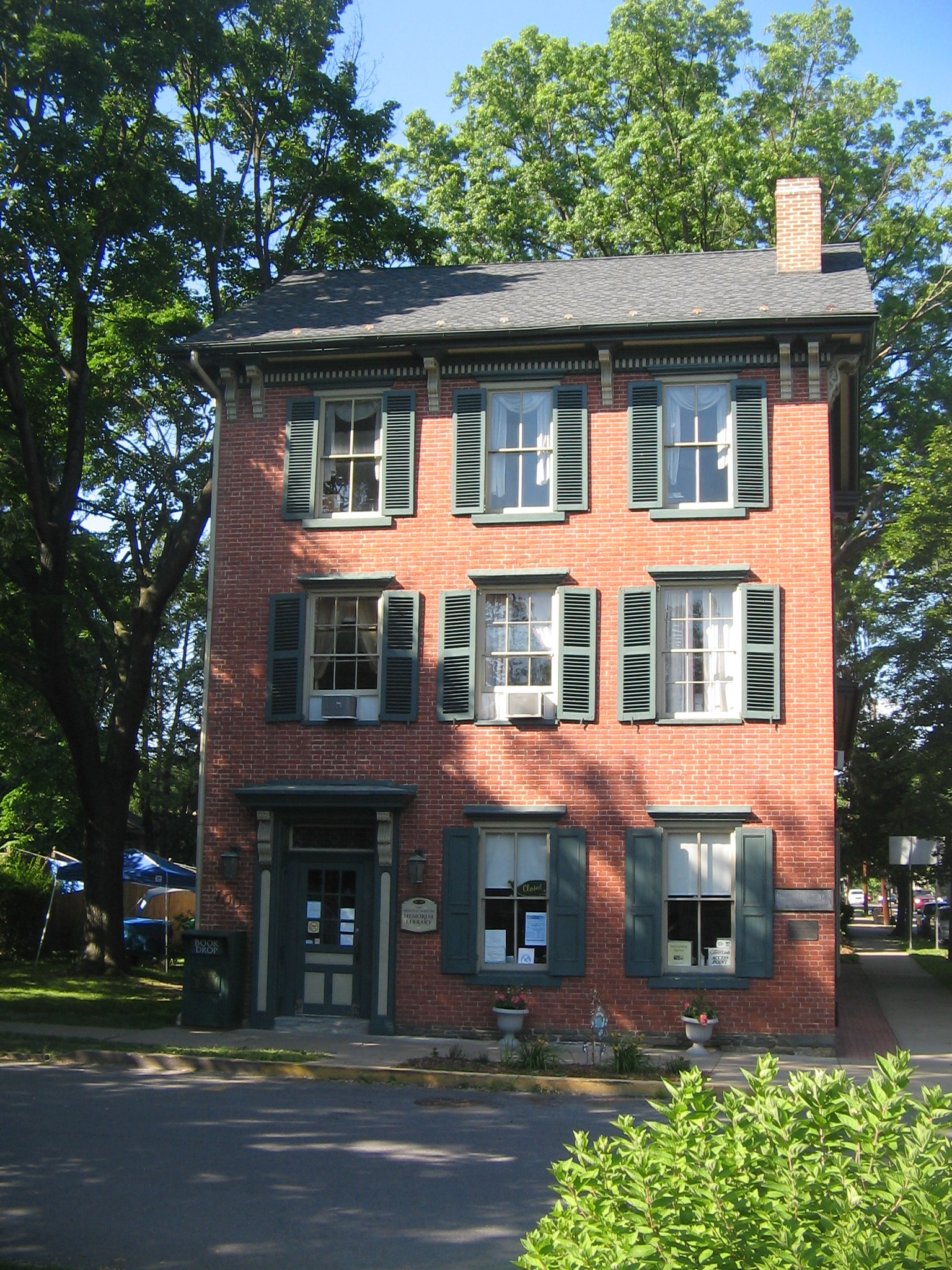

- Location within Pennsylvania Location within the United States
- Location: 100 King Street, Northumberland, Pennsylvania
- Coordinates: 40°53′20.31″N 76°47′36.75″W
- Built: 1820
- Architectural style: Federal
- NRHP reference No.: 81000554
- Added to NRHP: September 11, 1981

The Priestley-Forsyth Memorial Library, also known as the Dr. Joseph Priestley House or Cross Keys Inn, in Northumberland, Pennsylvania, was listed on the National Register of Historic Places in 1981.

== History and architectural features ==
This historic library building was originally erected and operated as an inn in 1820. It was purchased circa 1880 by the theologian and scientist Joseph Priestley's great-grandson, Dr. Joseph Priestley, who used it as a home and medical office. It was converted into a public library circa 1925.

It is located at 100 King Street in Northumberland, at the corner of Front Street (Route 11). It is within the Northumberland Historic District, which also includes the Joseph Priestley House.
