= Iqbal Naseer =

Pakistani politician

- اقبال نصیر

Chairman Public Accounts Committee Gilgit-Baltistan Council
- Incumbent
- Assumed office 12 November 2021

Personal details
- Born: 1975 (age 50–51) Chilas, district Diamer, Gilgit Baltistan
- Party: Pakistan Muslim League (N) (PML-N)

Iqbal Naseer (Urdu: اقبال نصیر) is a Pakistani politician who is currently serving as a Chairman Public Accounts Committee Gilgit-Baltistan Council since 12 November 2021. He belongs to Pakistan Muslim League (N) (PML-N).
