= Norrie =

Norrie may refer to:

== People ==
=== Surname ===
- Anna Norrie (1860–1957), Swedish operetta singer
- Bill Norrie (1929–2012), Canadian politician
- Bryan Norrie (born 1983), Australian rugby league footballer
- Cameron Norrie (born 1995), British tennis player
- David Norrie (born 1963), American football analyst and former player
- Kenneth Norrie (born 1946), Canadian economic historian
- Willoughby Norrie, 1st Baron Norrie (1893–1977), British army general

=== Given name ===
- Norrie Davidson (1934–2022), Scottish footballer
- Norrie Fairgray (1880–1968), Scottish footballer
- Norrie McCathie (1961–1996), Scottish footballer
- Norrie MacIver, Scottish musician
- Norrie Martin (1939–2013), Scottish footballer
- Norrie May-Welby, first legally genderless person in Australia
- Norrie Muir (1948–2019), Scottish climber
- Norrie Paramor (1914–1979), British record producer
- Norrie Rowan (born c. 1951), Scottish international rugby union player
- Norrie Woodhall (1905–2011), English actress

== Places ==
- Norrie, Colorado, United States
- Norrie, Wisconsin, United States
  - Norrie (community), Wisconsin, an unincorporated community

== Other ==
- Norrie disease, an eye disorder
- Elinore "Norrie" Calvert-Hill, a fictional character in Under the Dome

== See also ==
- Nori (disambiguation)
- Norry (disambiguation)
