= Syed Shabi ul Hasnain =

Pakistani politician

Syed Shabia Al Hasnain
- سید شبیہ الحسنین

Member of the Gilgit-Baltistan Council
- Incumbent
- Assumed office 12 November 2021

Personal details
- Political party: Pakistan Tehreek-e-Insaf (PTI)

Syed Shabia Al Hasnain (Urdu: سید شبیہ الحسنین) is a Pakistani politician who is currently serving as a member of the Gilgit-Baltistan Council since 12 November 2021. He belongs to Pakistan Tehreek-e-Insaf (PTI).
