= Daniel McFarlan Moore =

American electrical engineer and inventor

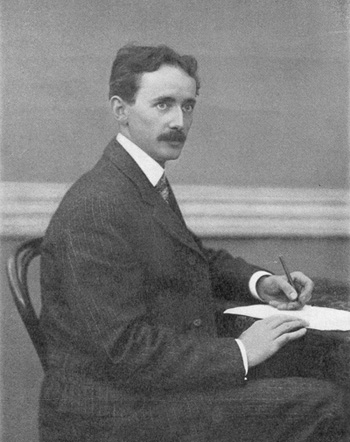
- 1906 photograph taken by the light of a Moore lamp
- Born: February 27, 1869; Northumberland, Pennsylvania
- Died: June 15, 1936 (aged 67); East Orange, New Jersey
- Cause of death: Murder
- Occupation: Engineer
- Spouse: Mary Alice Elliott (m. 1895)
- Parent(s): Alexander Davis Moore; Maria Louisa Douglas Moore

Daniel McFarlan Moore (February 27, 1869 – June 15, 1936) was an American electrical engineer and inventor. He developed a novel light source, the "Moore lamp", and a business that produced them in the early 1900s. The Moore lamp was the first commercially viable light-source based on gas discharges instead of incandescence; it was the predecessor to contemporary neon lighting and fluorescent lighting. In his later career Moore developed a miniature neon lamp that was extensively used in electronic displays, as well as vacuum tubes that were used in early television systems.

== Early life ==
He was born in Northumberland, Pennsylvania, on February 27, 1869. Moore was the son of the Reverend Alexander Davis and Maria Louisa Douglas Moore. He graduated from Lehigh University in 1889. Moore married Mary Alice Elliott, of New York City, on June 5, 1895. They had three children: Dorothy Mae Moore (1900–1990), Elliott McFarlan Moore (1902–1933), and Beatrice Jean Moore (1912–2007).

== Career ==
He began his career in 1890 working in the engineering department of the United Edison Manufacturing Company. At some point he started experimenting with producing light from glow discharges, which Heinrich Geissler had first developed in the 1850s. "What's wrong with my light?" Thomas Edison is said to have asked when he learned that Moore had started to tinker with light-producing tubes of gas as a potential replacement for the incandescent bulb. Moore is reported to have replied undiplomatically, "It's too small, too hot and too red." Moore left in 1894 to form his own companies, the Moore Electric Company and the Moore Light Company.

=== The Moore lamp ===
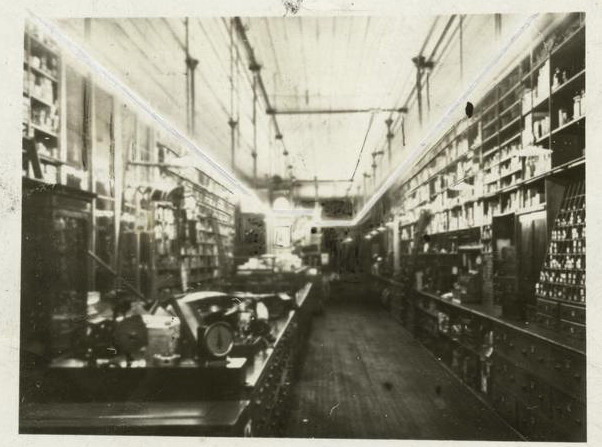
1904 photograph illustrating interior lighting by the first installation of Moore tubes in a hardware store in Newark, New Jersey.

Moore had devised his glow discharge lighting system by 1896. The Moore Lamp was an extension of the well-known Geissler tube, which used glass tubes from which the air had been removed and a different gas inserted. The low-pressure gas glows when a current is passed through it. As described in 1915, "In the Moore system of lighting the essential feature is the introduction of a special valve which automatically admits gas into the tube as the supply becomes exhausted." The Moore lamps utilized nitrogen or carbon dioxide as the luminous gas; Moore's innovation compensated for the gradual loss of gas in the lamp to the electrodes and the glass. Carbon dioxide gave a good quality white light. The first commercial installation was done in 1904 in a hardware store in Newark, New Jersey. The lamp yielded about 10 lumens per watt, which was about triple the output of incandescent lights based on carbon filaments. Arthur Bright has written, "Despite the fact that the tube was expensive to install, complicated, and required very high voltages, its operating advantages were great enough for it to find restricted use in stores, offices, and similar general lighting uses as well as in photography and some advertising and decorative applications."

The modest success of the Moore tubes was among the drivers for developing better filaments for standard incandescent light bulbs. Tungsten filament bulbs were a great enough improvement over carbon filaments that the Moore tubes "gradually disappeared from the market, leaving only short carbon-dioxide tubes in use for color matching, in which they excelled because of their daylight color. The General Electric Company absorbed the two Moore companies and Moore's patents in 1912. Moore himself rejoined General Electric's laboratory force."

=== Miniature neon lamp ===
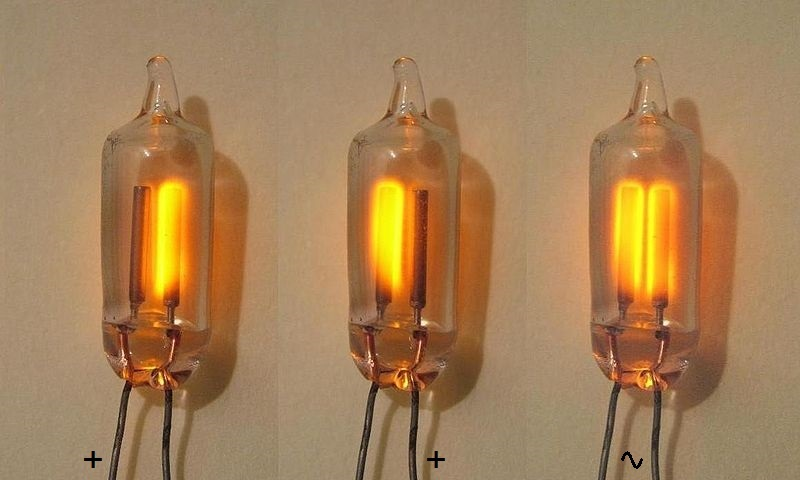
Three miniature neon lamps; each is about 0.75 inches long. The voltages across the lamps are left: DC (left lead positive), middle: DC (right lead positive), and right: AC.

Moore's inventions at General Electric included a miniature neon lamp that remained a fixture in electronic displays throughout the twentieth century, and was a forerunner of plasma displays. Both the lamp and his further inventions were also important to the early development of television. In particular, around 1917 Moore developed a "negative glow" neon lamp. These were miniature lamps with a very different design than the much larger neon tubes used for neon lighting; a Smithsonian Institution website notes, "These small, low power devices use a physical principle called 'coronal discharge.' Moore mounted two electrodes close together in a bulb and added neon or argon gas. The electrodes would glow brightly in red or blue, depending on the gas, and the lamps lasted for years. Since the electrodes could take almost any shape imaginable, a popular application has been fanciful decorative lamps. Glow lamps found practical use as indicators in instrument panels and in many home appliances until the acceptance of light-emitting diodes (LEDs) in the 1970s." In 1924 he invented the vacuum bulbs used in what was at that time called "telephotography" (sending still pictures by electricity or radio), and in 1925 improved the invention for use in television.

Moore was awarded the John Scott Medal of the Franklin Institute in 1911.

== Death ==
On June 15, 1936, at the age of 67, Moore was shot to death on the lawn of his home in East Orange, New Jersey, by an unemployed inventor who became enraged after finding that an invention he filed for was already the subject of a patent granted to Moore.

== Patents ==
- U.S. patent 496,366 Electrical Light Display (1893)
- U.S. patent 613,864 Phosphorescent Electrical Lighting (1898)
- U.S. patent 1,014,247 Fire for Joints in Vacuum Tubes (1912)
- U.S. patent 1,316,967 Gaseous-Conduction Lamp (1919)
