= Northumberland Historic District =

Historic district in Pennsylvania, United States

- U.S. National Register of Historic Places
- U.S. Historic district
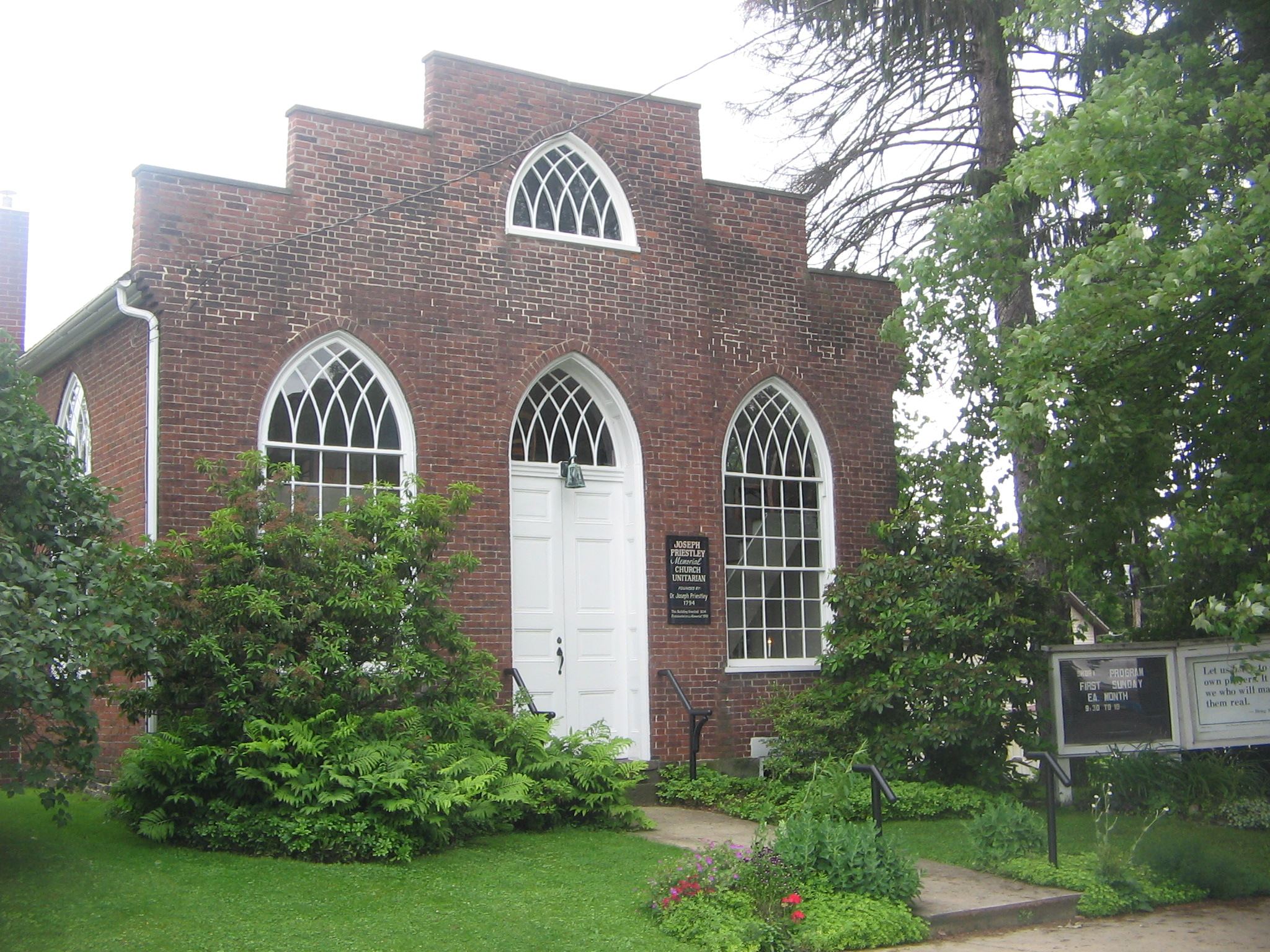
- Priestley Memorial Church is a contributing property in the district

- Location within Pennsylvania Location within the United States
- Location: Roughly bounded by Fourth and A Sts., North Shore RR and Wheatley Ave., Northumberland, Pennsylvania
- Coordinates: 40°53′26″N 76°47′39″W
- Area: 27 acres (11 ha)
- Architectural style: Early Republic, Italianate, Queen Anne
- NRHP reference No.: 88002313
- Added to NRHP: November 18, 1988

The Northumberland Historic District is a historic district listed in the US government's National Register of Historic Places in 1988. The "gem" of the district is a National Historic Landmark, the Joseph Priestley House. It includes one other separately Registered Historic Place, the Dr. Joseph Priestley House, also known as the "Priestley-Forsyth Memorial Library". It is bordered roughly by 4th Street, A Street, N. Shore Railroad, and Wheatley Avenue in Northumberland, Pennsylvania. In 1988 there were more than 100 contributing structures and 73 non-contributing structures in the district.

== Gallery ==
Seven photos are available: Photo 1, Photo 2, Photo 3, Photo 4, Photo 5, Photo 6, and Photo 7.

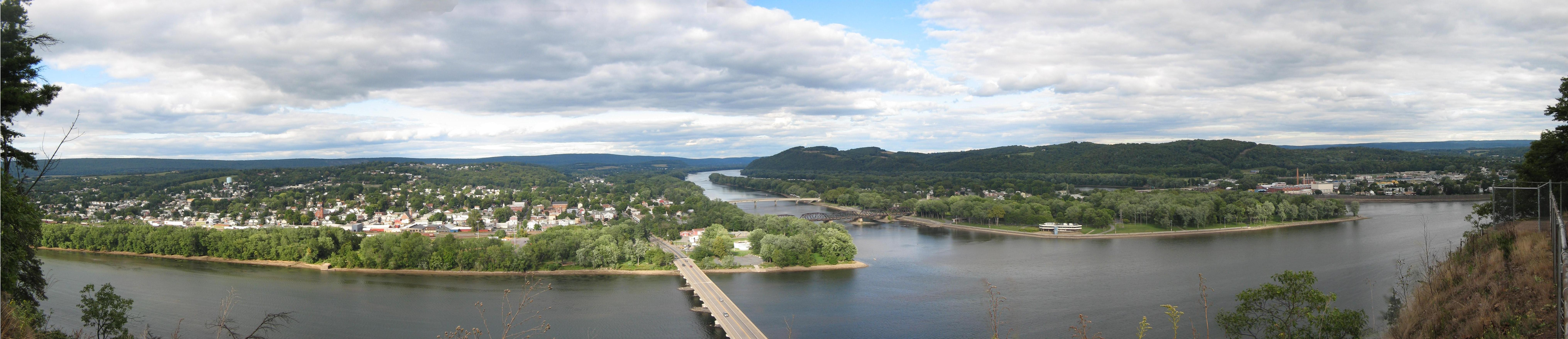
Panoramic view of Northumberland (left) with the confluence of the West Branch Susquehanna River (left) and North Branch (center) of the Susquehanna River, along with the borough of Sunbury (far right). Taken from the Shikellamy State Park Overlook, with the state park's Marina unit on Packer Island in the river visible.
