= Moshtaque Ahmad Noori =

Indian Urdu writer (born 1950)

- مشتاق احمد نوری
- Born: 7 May 1950 (age 76)
- Years active: 1995–present

Moshtaque Ahmad Noori (Urdu: مشتاق احمد نوری) (born 7 May 1950) is an Indian Urdu short story writer and critic. His works include short stories, Ghazals and nazm.

== Career ==
- He completed BPSC in 1977 and joined the Information and Public Relations Department. In 2011 he retired from the Government of Bihar. He was posted throughout Bihar, including Kishanganj, Purnea, Araria, Sasaram, Samastipur and finally to Patna. His final posting was in Chhapra under Saran Division, and he retired there from the post of joint director I&PRD.
- In his tenure as a government officer he served as chief PRO of Chief Minister of Bihar and as twice secretary to the Cabinet minister. He served as the secretary to Bihar Urdu Academy.
- His writing is also distributed in Bangladesh and Pakistan.
- Currently he is Positioned at Secretary, Bihar Urdu Academy.
- During his tenure at Bihar Urdu Academy, he has started a programme ‘Academy Aap tak’ under which the academy authorities visit different districts and honor senior and veteran poets and authors of each district who are in the twilight of their life, with Academy awards, instead of inviting them to Patna to honor them. Many Urdu Poets who are derived of reorganization has been benefited with this Program.
- Moshtaque Ahmad Noori also initiated " Jashn-e-Urdu. This was an event to connect Urdu Teachers to the Government. Since Urdu is the Second State Language.

== Recognition & awards ==
- Named as Talaash, Band Aankhon Ka Safar and Last in List Chaat Pe Thehri Dhoop and several Critical Analyses. His story Kain Kain, was translated into The Crow Chronicle and was published in the short story collection "Katha" edited by Joginder Paul.
- Bazm e Urdu Qatar (Established 1959) organised their 14th International Seminar on Sir Syed Ahmad Khan, an educator, politician and an Islamic reformist, and Mushaira on November 23, at Venus Hall of Radisson Blu Hotel Doha. Moshtaque Ahmad Noori was Chief guest and has been awarded as Bazm e Urdu Award.
- Bazm-e-Sadaf International Award 2017.
- Mehfil-e-Urdu Award by Ghulam Ali.
- The Karnataka Beary Sahitya Academy honorary awards 2009.
- Bazm-e-Urdu Qatar Award 2017.

== Works ==
- Band Aankhon Ka Safar
- Talash
- Chaat Pe Thehri Dhoop
- Kain Kain
