= Ahmed Ali Noori =

Pakistani politician

- احمد علی نوری

Member of the Gilgit-Baltistan Council
- Incumbent
- Assumed office 12 November 2021

Personal details
- Born: 1962; Skardu Baltistan
- Political party: Majlis Wahdat Muslimeen (MWM)
- Occupation: Religious scholar, Politician

Ahmed Ali Noori (Urdu: احمد علی نوری) is a Pakistani politician who is currently serving as a member of the Gilgit-Baltistan Council since 12 November 2021. He belongs to Majlis Wahdat Muslimeen (MWM).
