= Sweeta Noori =

Afghanistan-born advocate for women's rights (born 1973)

Sweeta Noori (born 1973) is an advocate for women's rights in Afghanistan. She is the country director for the Afghanistan chapter of the non-governmental organisation Women for Women International.

== Biography ==
Noori was born in Kabul in 1973. Her father was a police general in the Afghan military, and her mother was a medical doctor and professor. Noori began to study medicine but in 1992 was forced to withdraw when the government banned women from studying at university. Her family moved to Rawalpindi, Pakistan as refugees from the regime, and Noori later moved to the United States.

In 2004, Noori launched a micro-credit lending program focused on supporting women.

In her role as country director for Women for Women International, Noori has addressed members of the United States Congress and participated in a conference in Germany to discuss the future of Afghanistan.
