= Great Mosque of al-Nuri =

Great Mosque of al-Nuri may refer to:

- Great Mosque of al-Nuri (Homs), Syria
- Great Mosque of al-Nuri (Mosul), Iraq
