= Williamsport Sun-Gazette =

Newspaper published in Williamsport, Pennsylvania

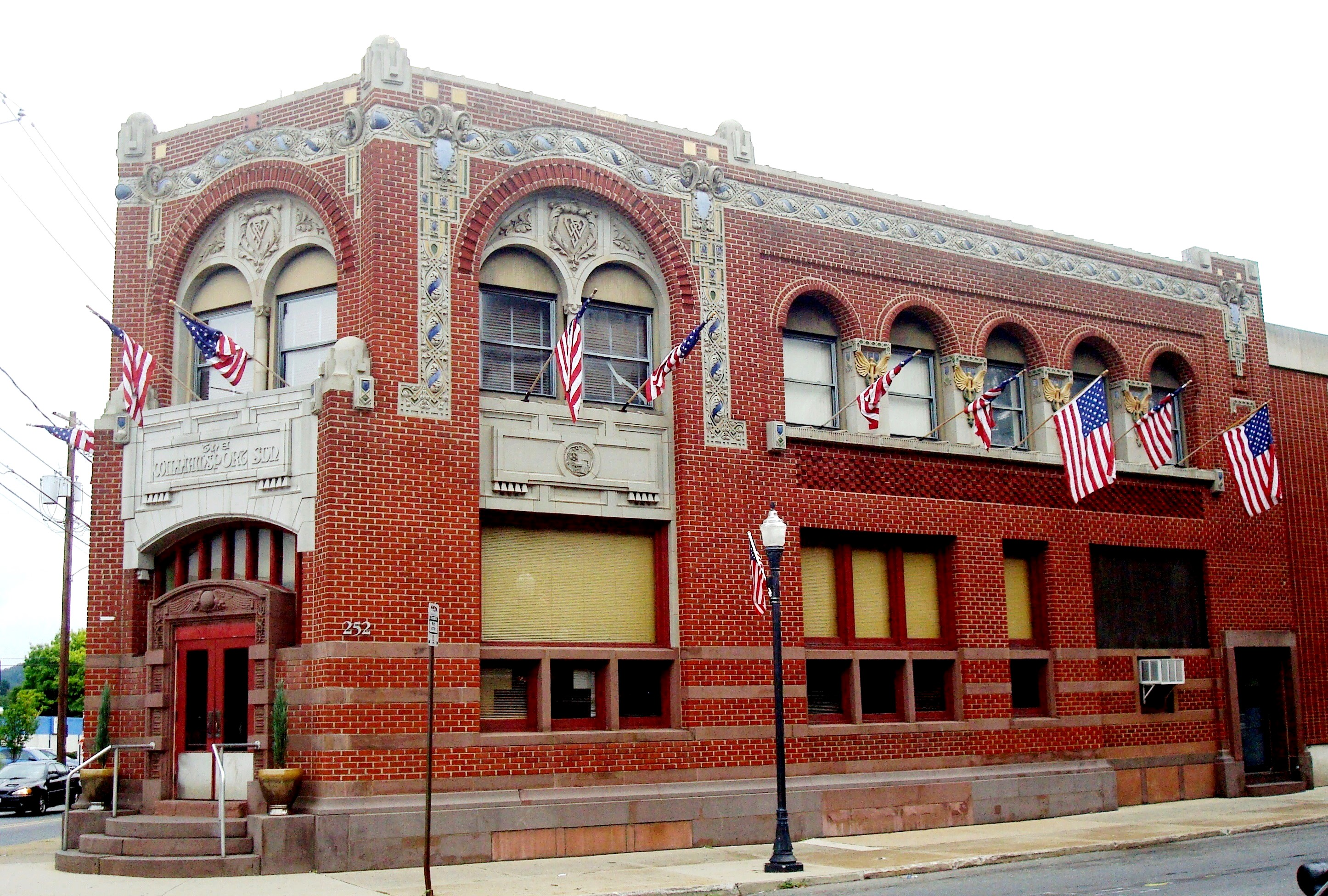
- Williamsport Sun-Gazette Building (2014)
- Type: Daily newspaper
- Format: Broadsheet
- Owner: Ogden Newspapers Inc.
- Publisher: John Leeser
- Editor: Michael Maneval
- Founded: 1801
- Language: English
- Headquarters: 252 W. Fourth Street; Williamsport, Pennsylvania 17703-0266; United States
- Website: sungazette.com

The Williamsport Sun-Gazette is published in Williamsport, Pennsylvania, in Lycoming County. Its earliest antecedents date to 1801. As of January 1, 2016, the daily circulation of the paper was listed as 19,000 daily Monday–Saturday, with a Sunday circulation of 24,000.

== History ==
The Williamsport Sun-Gazette was founded in 1801 as the Lycoming Gazette. At the time of the newspaper's conception, there were 131 residents in the town of Williamsport, Pennsylvania. The newspaper was started in a building in what is now the vicinity of Penn Street and Washington Boulevard. The Gazette name has been on the nameplate and masthead of a newspaper in Williamsport continuously since that time. The Sun-Gazette is the oldest continuously operating enterprise in the West Branch Valley.

At over 218 years old, the Sun-Gazette is now the 10th-oldest newspaper in America and the fourth-oldest in Pennsylvania. More than 32 other newspapers have operated and closed in the Williamsport area since 1801.

The Lycoming Gazette was a weekly paper from 1801 until 1867, when it was first published as a daily newspaper. The Lycoming Gazette then purchased the West Branch Bulletin, which was founded in 1860, and merged in 1869 to become the Gazette and Bulletin, which was a daily morning newspaper.

A rival newspaper, the Williamsport Sun, printed for the first time on July 8, 1870, as an afternoon paper.

=== 20th century through today ===
In 1955, the morning Gazette & Bulletin and the afternoon Williamsport Sun were consolidated and became the Williamsport Sun-Gazette, the area's afternoon newspaper.

John E. Person Jr. served as president of the new Williamsport Sun-Gazette from 1955 to 1990.

On July 1, 1990, the family-owned Sun-Gazette was acquired by another family owned newspaper group, Ogden Newspapers, which operates more than 40 newspapers throughout the United States, including the East Lycoming Shopper & News and the Muncy Luminary, both in Lycoming County. The Williamsport Sun-Gazette has been led by a series of publishers since 1990.

Publishers of The Williamsport Sun-Gazette for Ogden Newspapers, Inc. since July 1, 1990, include Thomas C. Briley 1990–2000, John A. Fusco 2001, John J. Yahner November 2001 – September 2007, Robert O. Rolley Jr. October 2007–2008, Bernard A. Oravec 2009-2018, Robert O. Rolley Jr. 2019–current.

Robert O. Rolley Jr. returned to lead the Williamsport Sun-Gazette in 2019 shortly after the departure of Bernard A. Oravec. Rolley now serves as publisher of both the Williamsport Sun-Gazette and The Express in Lock Haven.

In January 1991, the Sun-Gazette published the first Sunday edition, becoming a seven-day-a-week publication, including holidays. Prior to that time, the Grit newspaper was the Sunday paper for the area, until Grit was purchased and moved to Topeka, Kansas, in 1993, later converting to magazine format. Coincidentally, both the Sun-Gazette and Grit are now owned by Ogden Newspapers.

On August 9, 1999, 130 years after the merger of the Lycoming Gazette and the West Branch Bulletin, the Sun-Gazette returned to the morning edition format.

A Community Keystone; The Official History of The Williamsport Sun-Gazette was published in July 2018. This special hardcover book contains over 500 photos and 448 pages of detailed newspaper and community history, divided into 37 chapters that cover the entire 217 years of newspaper publication in Williamsport since 1801. This book was featured on PCN's PA Books television show on November 11, 2018.
