= Northumberland, Pennsylvania =

Borough in Pennsylvania, US

- Borough
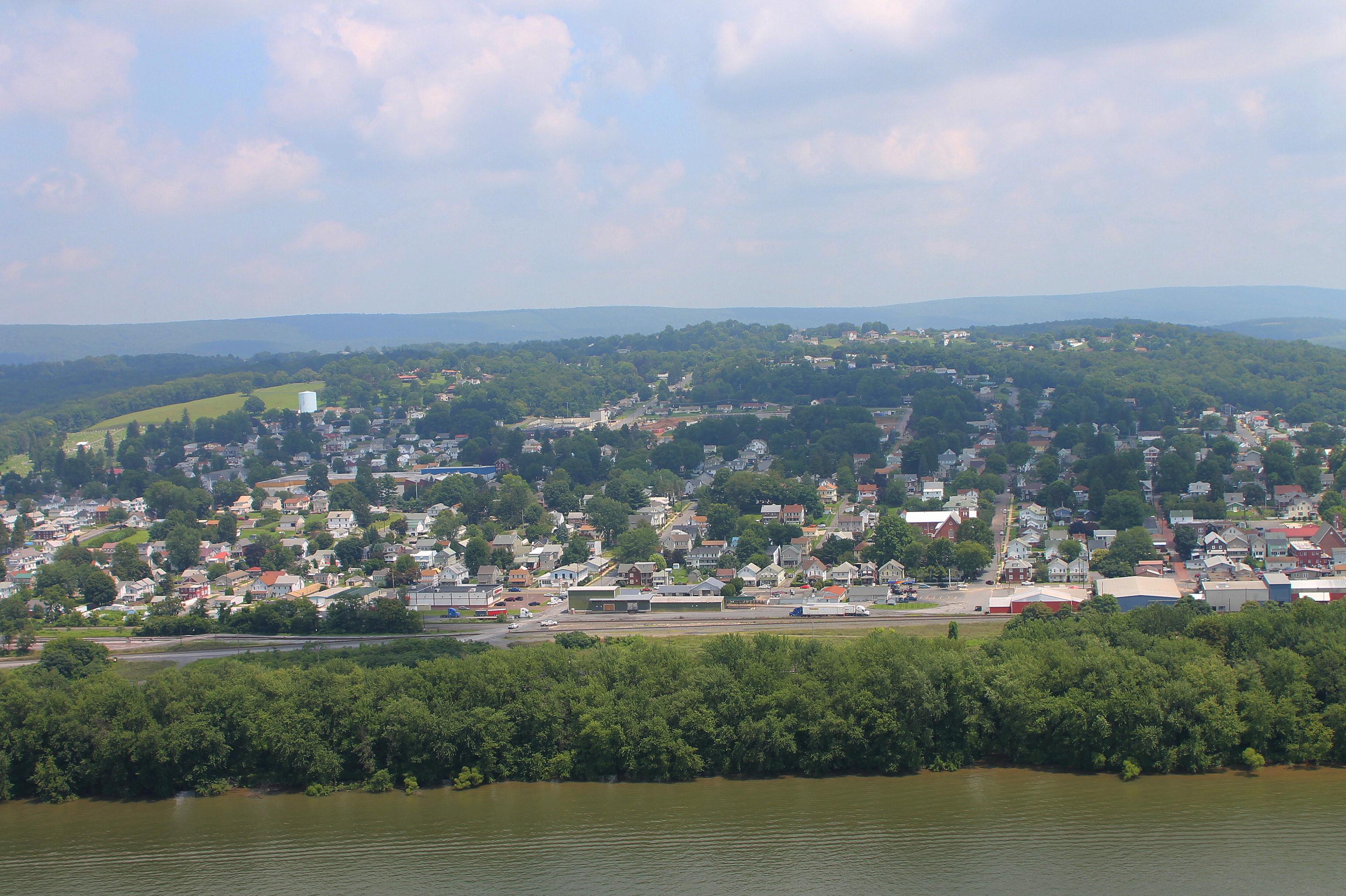
- View of Northumberland in July 2015
- Nickname: "Norry"
- Location of Northumberland in Northumberland County, Pennsylvania

- Location on Northumberland in Pennsylvania Northumberland (the United States)
- Coordinates: 40°53′38″N 76°47′46″W
- Country: United States
- State: Pennsylvania
- County: Northumberland
- Settled: 1772
- Incorporated: 1828

Government
  - Type: Borough Council
  - Mayor: Dan Berard

Area
  - Total: 1.61 sq mi (4.17 km^{2})
  - Land: 1.61 sq mi (4.17 km^{2})
  - Water: 0 sq mi (0.00 km^{2})
- Elevation (borough benchmark): 512 ft (156 m)
- Highest elevation (northern boundary of borough): 820 ft (250 m)
- Lowest elevation (confluence of West Branch and Susquehanna River): 430 ft (130 m)

Population (2020)
  - Total: 3,911
  - Density: 2,428.8/sq mi (937.77/km^{2})
- Time zone: UTC-5 (Eastern (EST))
  - Summer (DST): UTC-4 (EDT)
- ZIP Code: 17857
- Area codes: 570 and 272
- FIPS code: 42-55456
- Website: Northumberland borough

Northumberland is a borough in Northumberland County, Pennsylvania, United States. The population was 3,911 at the 2020 census.

== History ==
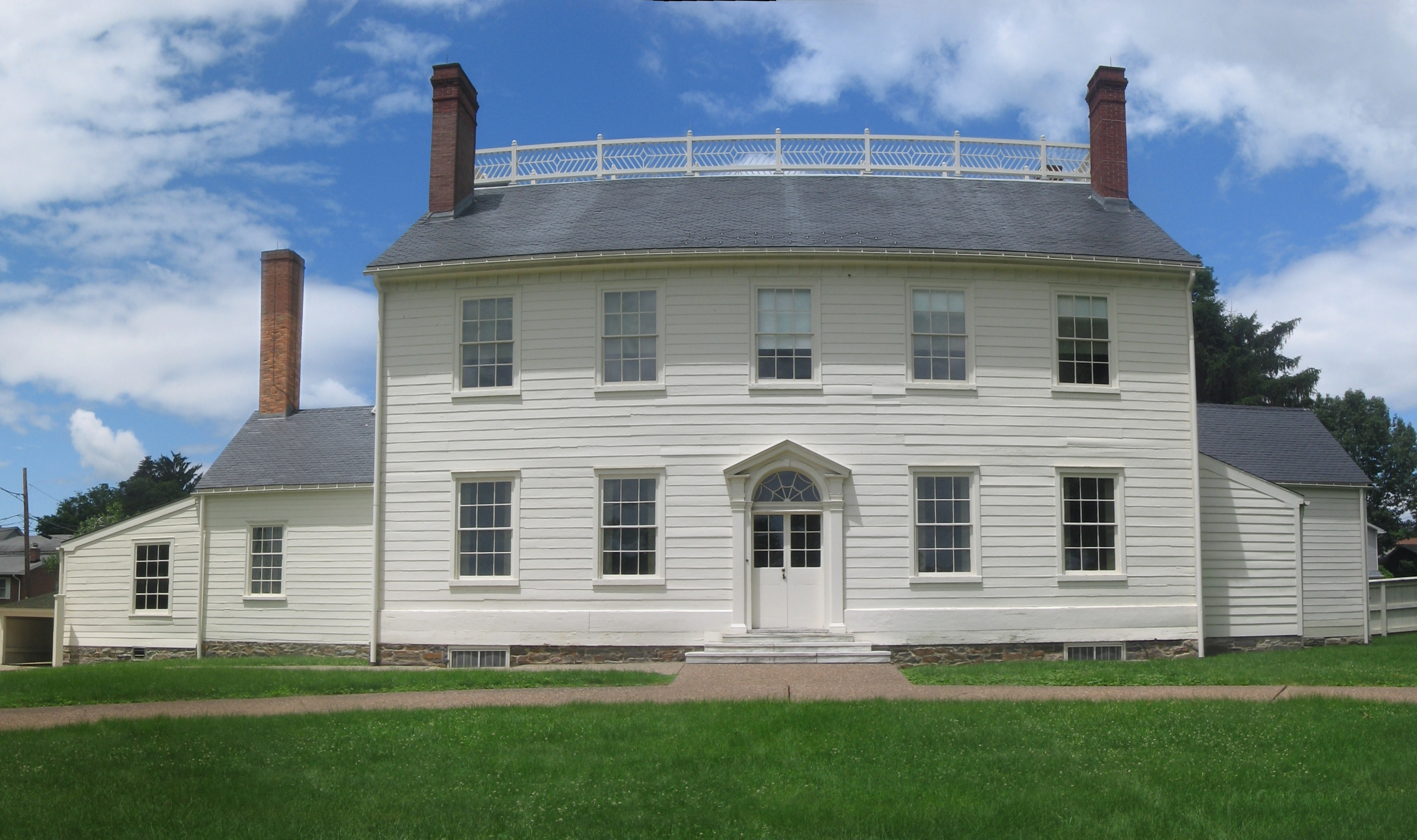
Joseph Priestley House, a National Historic Landmark in Northumberland

A brewer named Reuben Haines, a native of Philadelphia, founded the town of Northumberland in 1772, attempting to set it up as an English village. The land that became Northumberland was purchased from the Iroquois in the first Treaty of Fort Stanwix in 1768, and the village was laid out in 1772. During the American Revolution, Northumberland was evacuated during the Big Runaway in 1778, and only finally resettled in 1784.

Northumberland was the American home of 18th-century British theologian, Dissenting clergyman, natural philosopher, educator, and political theorist Joseph Priestley (1733–1804) from 1794 until his death in 1804. The Joseph Priestley House still stands on Priestley Avenue and is a National Historic Landmark on the National Register of Historic Places (NRHP) and a museum administered by the Pennsylvania Historical and Museum Commission. There is one other property in the borough on the NRHP: the Priestley-Forsyth Memorial Library, built by a great-grandson of Joseph Priestley. Much of the borough is part of the Northumberland Historic District, which is also on the NRHP.

== Geography ==
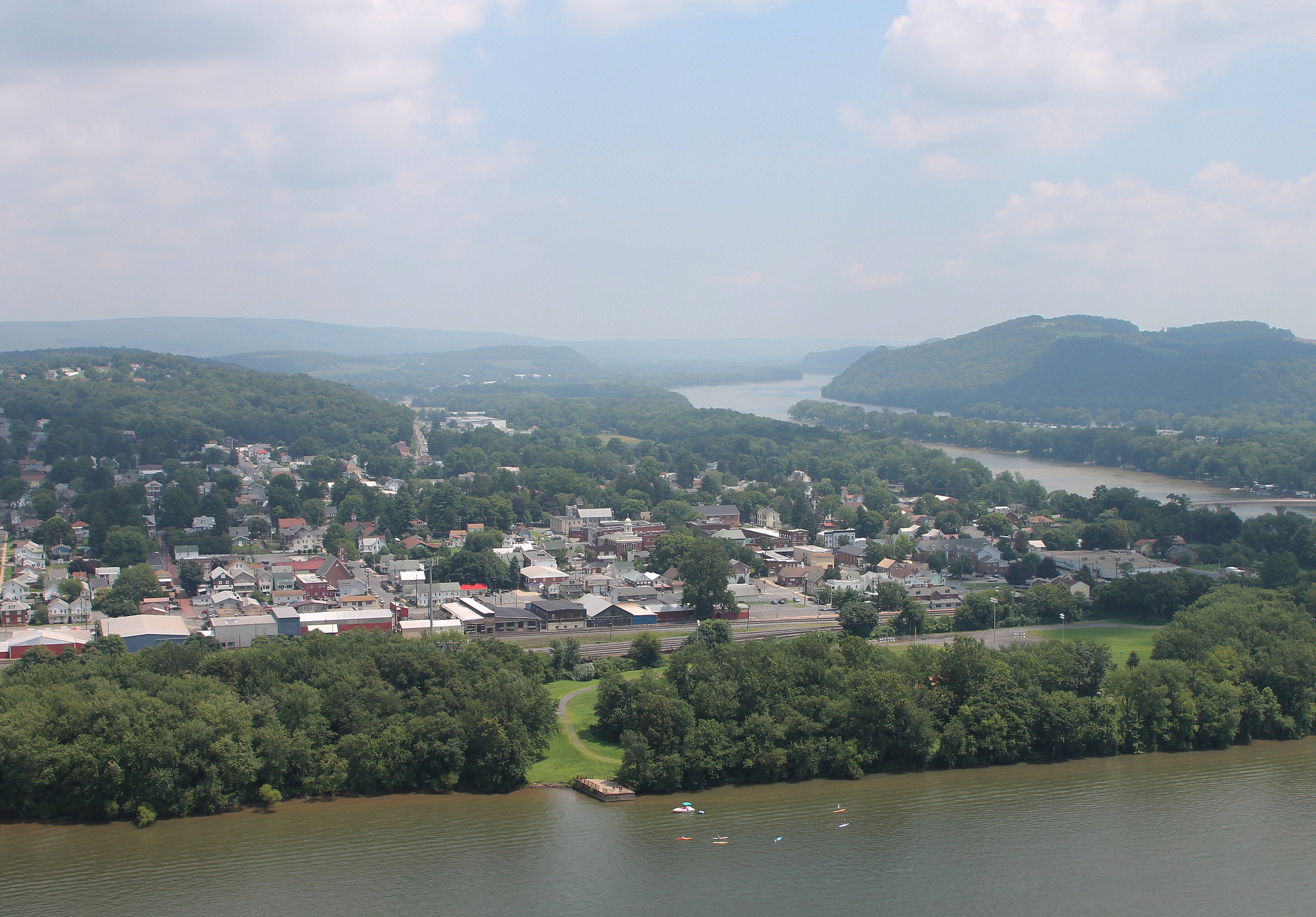
View of Northumberland from the Shikellamy State Park overlook

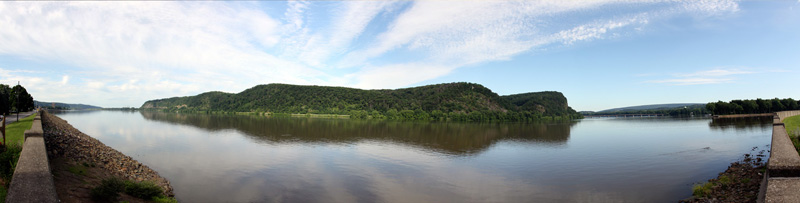
The Susquehanna River near Northumberland

Northumberland is located at 40°53′38″N 76°47′46″W (40.893935, -76.795975), approximately 60 miles northeast of Harrisburg. It sits at the confluence of the north and west branches of the Susquehanna River.

According to the U.S. Census Bureau, the borough has a total area of 1.6 square miles (4.1 km^{2}), all land.

Notable things to visit in Northumberland include Pineknotter Park, the Joseph Priestly House, King Street Park, the Northumberland High School Museum, 2nd Street Playground, and Howling Hollow Dog Park. The Central Susquehanna River Boat Society is currently planning to build a river boat in Northumberland's Pineknotter Park in order to boost tourism in the area. The group expects the river boat to be ready for its maiden voyage by the summer of 2025.

== Demographics ==
Historical population
Census	Pop.	Note	%±
1830	1,090		—
1840	923		−15.3%
1850	1,041		12.8%
1860	1,108		6.4%
1870	1,788		61.4%
1880	2,293		28.2%
1890	2,744		19.7%
1900	2,748		0.1%
1910	3,517		28.0%
1920	4,061		15.5%
1930	4,483		10.4%
1940	4,469		−0.3%
1950	4,207		−5.9%
1960	4,156		−1.2%
1970	4,102		−1.3%
1980	3,636		−11.4%
1990	3,860		6.2%
2000	3,714		−3.8%
2010	3,804		2.4%
2020	3,911		2.8%

=== 2020 census ===
As of the 2020 census, Northumberland had a population of 3,911. The median age was 42.6 years. 20.7% of residents were under the age of 18 and 22.9% of residents were 65 years of age or older. For every 100 females there were 95.1 males, and for every 100 females age 18 and over there were 90.4 males age 18 and over.

99.9% of residents lived in urban areas, while 0.1% lived in rural areas.

There were 1,727 households in Northumberland, of which 26.1% had children under the age of 18 living in them. Of all households, 42.0% were married-couple households, 19.6% were households with a male householder and no spouse or partner present, and 28.8% were households with a female householder and no spouse or partner present. About 33.3% of all households were made up of individuals and 15.9% had someone living alone who was 65 years of age or older.

There were 1,873 housing units, of which 7.8% were vacant. The homeowner vacancy rate was 2.2% and the rental vacancy rate was 7.3%.

Racial composition as of the 2020 census
Race	Number	Percent
White	3,514	89.8%
Black or African American	47	1.2%
American Indian and Alaska Native	5	0.1%
Asian	19	0.5%
Native Hawaiian and Other Pacific Islander	4	0.1%
Some other race	134	3.4%
Two or more races	188	4.8%
Hispanic or Latino (of any race)	269	6.9%

=== 2000 census ===
As of the 2000 census, there were 3,714 people, 1,657 households, and 1,045 families residing in the borough. The population density was 2,368.2 inhabitants per square mile (914.4/km^{2}). There were 1,772 housing units at an average density of 1,129.9 per square mile (436.3/km^{2}). The racial makeup of the borough was 98.38% White, 0.73% African American, 0.13% Native American, 0.19% Asian, 0.40% from other races, and 0.16% from two or more races. Hispanic or Latino of any race were 0.62% of the population.

There were 1,657 households, out of which 25.9% had children under the age of 18 living with them, 50.3% were married couples living together, 10.3% had a female householder with no husband present, and 36.9% were non-families. 32.0% of all households were made up of individuals, and 13.3% had someone living alone who was 65 years of age or older. The average household size was 2.22 and the average family size was 2.79.

In the borough the population was spread out, with 21.7% under the age of 18, 6.7% from 18 to 24, 29.2% from 25 to 44, 24.2% from 45 to 64, and 18.2% who were 65 years of age or older. The median age was 40 years. For every 100 females, there were 90.1 males. For every 100 females age 18 and over, there were 85.8 males.

The median income for a household in the borough was $31,891, and the median income for a family was $38,807. Males had a median income of $31,162 versus $22,203 for females. The per capita income for the borough was $18,229. About 4.5% of families and 7.7% of the population were below the poverty line, including 7.7% of those under age 18 and 6.8% of those age 65 or over.

== Government ==
A seven-seat Council governs the Borough of Northumberland, with a mayor taking on a largely ceremonial role. Council members serve for four-year terms, as does the mayor. The current mayor, Dan Berard, was elected to serve a second term in November 2023 and sworn in January 2024.

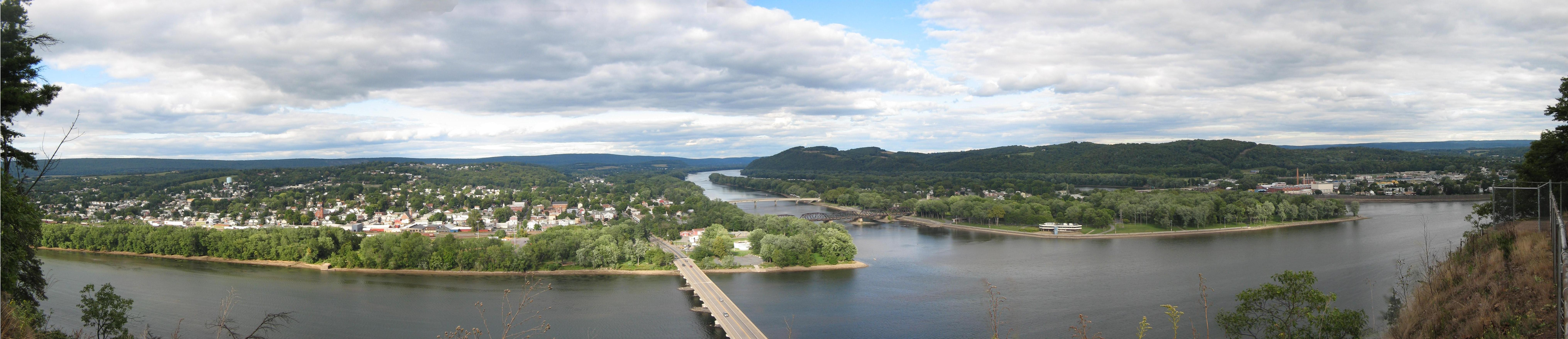
Panoramic view of Northumberland (left) with the confluence of the West Branch Susquehanna River (left) and North Branch (center) of the Susquehanna River, along with the borough of Sunbury (far right). Taken from the Shikellamy State Park Overlook, with the state park's Marina unit on Packer Island in the river visible.

== Notable people ==
- Eddie Burke, major league baseball player for the Phillies, Brewers, Reds, and Giants during the 1890s
- Helen Taggart Clark, (pen name, H. T. C.), journalist and poet
- Uzal Girard Ent, World War II major general
- David Fulmer, author of seven novels about Storyville, New Orleans, five other works of fiction, and the writer-producer of the documentary film Blind Willie's Blues
- Daniel McFarlan Moore, electrical engineer and inventor of the Moore lamp
- Elizabeth Nesbitt, children's librarian and library science educator
- Joseph Priestley, chemist and co-discoverer of oxygen
- Theodore Van Kirk, navigator on the Enola Gay during the bombing of Hiroshima
