= Nuri (disambiguation) =

Nuri is an archaeological site in Sudan.

Nuri or Nüri may also refer to:

== Places ==
- Nuri, East Azerbaijan, a village in Iran
- Nuri, Razavi Khorasan, Iran, a village
- Nüri, Estonia, a village

== Other uses ==
- Nuri (name), a list of people with the given name or surname
- Nuri (rocket), a South Korean carrier rocket
- Great Mosque of al-Nuri (disambiguation) or Nuri Mosque
- List of storms named Nuri, three tropical cyclones in the Western Pacific Ocean
- Nuri (company), a German bitcoin banking service formerly known as Bitwala
- Nuri (story), a 1947 story by Premendra Mitra
