= Hillel Norry =

American rabbi

Personal life
- Born: Rochester, NY
- Parent: Sharon Singer Norry (mother)
- Education: Brandeis University

Religious life
- Religion: Judaism

Hillel Norry is an American rabbi.

== Work ==
Norry completed rabbinical school at the Jewish Theological Seminary of America (JTS) in 1993. After ordination, he taught at JTS for a short time.

The synagogue Shaare Zedek hired Norry in 1994, where he was able to attract younger members to join it. Norry supported caretaking, cleanup, and responsibility over a cemetery owned by the synagogue, navigating declining interest for those tasks among board-members. He left Shaare Zedek in 2002, taking a position in Atlanta. According to the New York Jewish Week, Norry "was widely credited with reviving" the congregation.

In 2002, Norry took a senior rabbi position with Congregation Shearith Israel, a Conservative synagogue in Atlanta, Georgia. As of 2014, Norry remained in this position. In April 2021, Norry was interim rabbi in Chattanooga's B’nai Zion, then joined Temple Beth-El as interim rabbi in Birmingham as of June 2021, and remains in that position as of August 2021.

Norry is a member of the National Jewish Center for Learning and Leadership's Rabbis Without Borders program. In 2009, he was among the program's first cohort of fellows.

Norry served as rabbinic consultant for Keeping the Faith, a romantic comedy released in 2000. The film depicts a love triangle between a Conservative rabbi, a Catholic priest and friend of the rabbi, and a childhood friend of the pair. Reflecting in 2020 on the movie, Norry said, "I met with Ed Norton, and they asked if I would be their consultant... I said I do want to do it, but I need to see the script and I need to know that it’s not disrespectful to rabbis and Judaism. They sent me a script, and I signed on, and I actually really like the story".

== Early life and education ==
Norry was born in Rochester, New York. He attended public school there. He attended Brandeis University, at that time intending to enter academia.

His grandparents Ruth and Sol Singer were among Atlanta's Jewish leadership. His mother Sharon Norry was involved in arts and Judaica.

== Views ==
Norry participates in martial arts and says he began self-defense after a man who had previously sent him antisemitic messages appeared at his synagogue and threatened him in person. He feels that similar intensity, focus, and ritual are present in both Jewish spiritual practice and martial arts, saying, "I think my martial arts practice changed my Judaism. I became a different kind of Jew. I began to really see my prayer life as a parallel to martial training." Norry says he started learning Tae Kwon Do and marksmanship in the 2010s. He believes this allowed him to provide an experiential form of learning and arts. As rabbi, Norry was accepting of congregants who brought concealed weapons to services, saying, "We have an armed security guard ... every Shabbat, but he's just one guy."

Norry is vegan. He has a home garden and is a prolific pickler, a practice he learned from his mother.
