= U.S. Route 122 (1935–1963) =

Former highway in Pennsylvania, United States

U.S. Route 122

Route information
- Auxiliary route of US 22
- Maintained by PDH
- Existed: 1935–1963

Major junctions
- South end: US 1 / PA 472 in Oxford
- US 30 near Parkesburg; US 322 in Honey Brook; PA 23 in Morgantown; US 222 / PA 73 in Reading; US 422 / PA 83 in Reading; US 22 in Hamburg; US 209 in Pottsville; PA 45 in Ashland; PA 54 in Mount Carmel; PA 14 in Sunbury
- North end: US 11 / PA 14 in Northumberland

Location
- Country: United States
- State: Pennsylvania
- Counties: Chester, Lancaster, Berks, Schuylkill, Columbia, Northumberland

Highway system
- United States Numbered Highway System; List; Special; Divided; Pennsylvania State Route System; Interstate; US; State; Scenic; Legislative
← PA 121	→ PA 123

U.S. Route 122 (US 122) was a United States Numbered Highway that was a spur of US 22. Located in the state of Pennsylvania, it existed from 1935 to 1963. At its greatest extent, the route ran from US 1 and Pennsylvania Route 472 (PA 472) in Oxford north to US 11 and PA 14 in Northumberland. Along the way, US 122 passed through Parkesburg, Honey Brook, Morgantown, Reading, Hamburg, Schuylkill Haven, Pottsville, Frackville, Ashland, Centralia, Mount Carmel, Shamokin, and Sunbury.

What would become US 122 between Reading and Northumberland was designated as part of US 120 in 1926. In 1927, PA 42 was designated onto what became US 122 between Oxford and Centralia, running concurrently with US 120 between Reading and Centralia. The same year, US 120 became concurrent with PA 45 between Ashland and Shamokin, PA 55 between Shamokin and Sunbury, and PA 14 between Sunbury and Northumberland. All the concurrent state routes except PA 14 were removed from US 120 in 1928, which split PA 42 into two sections; the southern section ran from Oxford to Reading. In 1935, US 122 was designated to run from US 1/PA 472 in Oxford north to US 11/US 111/PA 14 in Northumberland, replacing PA 42 between Oxford and Reading and US 120 between Reading and Northumberland. In the 1950s, the south end of US 122 was cut back to PA 23 in Morgantown, with PA 10 replacing the route between Oxford and Morgantown. US 122 was decommissioned in 1963 and was replaced with an extended PA 10 between Morgantown and Reading, PA 61 between Reading and Sunbury, and PA 147 (now PA 405) between Sunbury and Northumberland.

== Route description ==
This route description features US 122 as it existed in 1950, with references to today's highways to provide context.

=== Oxford to Reading ===
US 122 began at an intersection with US 1 and PA 472 at Third and Market streets in Oxford, Chester County, where US 1 headed south on Third Street and headed north on Market Street concurrent with southbound PA 472. From here, US 122 headed north concurrent with PA 472 on two-lane undivided Third Street for a block before PA 472 split to the northwest. US 122 continued north along present-day PA 10 and left Oxford. The route became Limestone Road and continued northeast to a junction with PA 896 in Russellville. A short distance later, the road intersected the western terminus of PA 926. US 122 continued north and reached Cochranville, where it crossed PA 41. The route headed north as Limestone Road before it came to Parkesburg, where it became Church Street and intersected PA 372. After leaving Parkesburg, US 122 continued northwest along Octorara Trail before it split from the present-day alignment of PA 10 by following current Hershey Lane north to an intersection with US 30; this intersection is now cut off by the interchange between US 30 and the western terminus of US 30 Bus. At this point, US 122 turned west for a concurrency with US 30 along multilane Lincoln Highway. US 122 split from US 30 by turning north onto two-lane Octorara Trail, once again following the present-day alignment of PA 10. The route continued north and reached Compass, where it turned northwest for a short concurrency with PA 340 along Kings Highway. Following this, US 122 followed Compass Road and headed northeast and then north. The route reached Honey Brook, where it became Pequea Avenue before it crossed US 322, where the name changed to Conestoga Avenue. The road left Honey Brook as Twin County Road.

US 122 entered Lancaster County and continued north along Twin County Road, crossing the Conestoga Creek before it reached a junction with PA 23. At this point, the route turned northeast to form a concurrency with PA 23 on Main Street, crossing into Berks County. In Morgantown, US 122 split from PA 23 by turning north onto Morgantown Road. The route continued north and passed through the communities of Plowville and Beckersville. Farther north, the road entered the city of Reading. US 122 continued into Reading along Morgantown Road and headed northwest to an intersection with US 222/PA 73 (present-day US 222 Bus.) at Lancaster Avenue. At this point, US 122 turned northeast to join US 222/PA 73 along Lancaster Avenue, crossing the Schuylkill River. After crossing the river, the road name changed to Bingaman Street. US 122/US 222 turned north onto Fifth Street while PA 73 continued northeast along Bingaman Street. The road headed into the downtown area of Reading, where it crossed US 422/PA 83 at Penn Street. Following this, US 122/US 222 continued north along Fifth Street.

=== Reading to Northumberland ===
US 122 split from US 222 by turning northwest onto Centre Avenue, which is present-day PA 61. The route left the city of Reading and became multilane Pottsville Pike. The road passed through Tuckerton and continued north to Leesport. In Leesport, US 122 turned to the northwest as Centre Avenue and intersected PA 383, which headed southwest along Wall Street. At this point, US 122 became concurrent with PA 383, with PA 383 splitting by turning northeast onto Shackamaxon Street. The route left Leesport and continued north along Pottsville Pike a short distance to the east of the Schuylkill River. In Shoemakersville, the road intersected the northern terminus of PA 662. US 122 continued north to Hamburg, where it split from the present-day alignment of PA 61 by heading north along two-lane Fourth Street into Hamburg. In the center of Hamburg, the route intersected US 22 at State Street. US 122 turned northwest onto Port Clinton Avenue and left Hamburg, heading parallel to the Schuylkill River.

US 122 entered Schuylkill County and followed Blue Mountain Road to Port Clinton, where it turned north onto multilane Center Street, once again following the present-day alignment of PA 61. The road left Port Clinton and became Centre Turnpike, crossing the Little Schuylkill River before it reached a junction with PA 895 in Molino. At this point, PA 895 became concurrent with US 122 and the two routes headed to the northwest. In Deer Lake, PA 895 split from US 122 by turning to the southwest. From here, the route continued northwest and became a two-lane road as it bypassed Orwigsburg to the southwest. US 122 came to an intersection with PA 443, at which point that route joined US 122 in a concurrency. The two routes headed west as a multilane road called Center Avenue to Schuylkill Haven, where PA 443 split from US 122 by heading south. Past Schuylkill Haven, US 122 reached a junction with the northern terminus of PA 83 (present-day PA 183) and turned north as an unnamed road, running to the east of the Schuylkill River. Farther north, US 122 split from present-day PA 61 by turning northwest onto Center Street, crossing the Schuylkill River. The route headed north along Center Street through Mount Carbon. US 122 entered the city of Pottsville and followed Center Street north to a junction with US 209 at Mauch Chunk Street. At this point, Center Street continued north as US 209 southbound while US 122 turned east for a concurrency with US 209 on Mauch Chunk Street. US 122 split from US 209 by turning north onto multilane Pottsville Boulevard (now Claude A. Lord Boulevard), picking up the current alignment of PA 61 again. The road turned east and north as it headed out of the city of Pottsville.

US 122 continued north along multilane Pottsville-St. Clair Highway before it deviated from present-day PA 61 by heading north through St. Clair along two-lane Second Street. After leaving St. Clair, the route continued north along current PA 61 again, following an unnamed multilane road north-northwest to Frackville. In Frackville, US 122 followed Lehigh Avenue north to an intersection with the southern terminus of PA 924, where PA 924 continued north along Lehigh Avenue and US 122 turned west onto Oak Street. After leaving Frackville, the route continues west and the name changes to Fountain Street before it passes through Fountain Springs, where it turns northwest onto Broad Street. The road curves north and enters Ashland, where it becomes Hoffman Boulevard. In Ashland, US 122 came to an intersection with the western terminus of the eastern section of PA 45 (present-day PA 54) at Centre Street, where US 122 turned west onto Centre Street. US 122 came to an intersection with the eastern terminus of PA 54, where PA 54 continued west along Centre Street and US 122 turned north onto Memorial Boulevard. The route left Ashland and curved northeast. US 122 entered Columbia County and became an unnamed road. The route deviated again from present-day PA 61 as it headed onto an alignment that is now closed because of the Centralia mine fire. After picking up the current alignment of PA 61 again, US 122 continued north into Centralia along Locust Avenue. The route intersected the southern terminus of PA 42, where PA 42 continued north along Locust Avenue and US 122 turned west onto Centre Street. The road left Centralia and became unnamed.

US 122 crossed into Northumberland County and continued west along a multilane road to Mount Carmel. In Mount Carmel, the route followed Fifth Street before it intersected PA 54 at Chestnut Street. At this point, PA 54 became concurrent with US 122 and the two routes turned north on Market Street and west on East Avenue. US 122/PA 54 turned north onto Poplar Street and headed out of Mount Carmel, where the multilane road became unnamed and headed west through Atlas. PA 54 split from US 122 by turning to the north while US 122 continued west and passed through Kulpmont on Chestnut Street. The route continued west as an unnamed multilane road and entered Shamokin, where it headed northwest on Mt. Carmel Street before turning west onto Sunbury Street. US 122 came to an intersection with the northern terminus of PA 125 and turned northwest onto Sixth Street, leaving Shamokin. The route became an unnamed multilane road and reached a junction with the northern terminus of PA 225. A short distance past this intersection, the road narrowed to two lanes and came to the community of Weigh Scales, where it turned north and became a multilane road again. US 122 came to an intersection with the western terminus of PA 742 (present-day PA 487) in Paxinos, where it turned west and soon narrowed to two lanes. The route passed through Stonington and briefly became a multilane road before narrowing back to two lanes. Farther west, the road name became State Street and it intersected the northern terminus of PA 890. The route entered Sunbury and headed west through the city along Market Street. US 122 came to an intersection with PA 14 (present-day PA 405) along the east bank of the Susquehanna River, at which point it turned north to form a concurrency with PA 14 along Front Street. The road crossed the Susquehanna River, Packer Island, and more of the river into Northumberland. In Northumberland, the road became King Street and US 122 reached its northern terminus at an intersection with US 11, where PA 14 turned southwest to follow US 11 and continue along the present-day alignment of PA 405.

== History ==
The portion of US 122 along Limestone Road in Chester County was originally a Native American trail. On March 25, 1805, the Centre Turnpike Road Company was chartered to build the Centre Turnpike, a turnpike running from Reading northwest to Sunbury along the rough alignment of what would become US 122. Construction of the Centre Turnpike began in 1808 and was completed in 1814. Following the passage of the Sproul Road Bill in 1911, what would become US 122 was designated as Legislative Route 274 between Oxford and Reading, Legislative Route 160 between Reading and Hamburg, Legislative Route 141 between Hamburg and Schuylkill Haven, Legislative Route 140 between Schuylkill Haven and Pottsville, and Legislative Route 161 between Pottsvile and Sunbury. By 1926, the entire length of Legislative Route 274 was paved except between Compass and south of Honey Brook and Honey Brook and Morgantown.

With the creation of the U.S. Highway System in 1926, the road between Reading and Northumberland was designated as part of US 120, a route that ran from Philadelphia northwest to Erie. At this time, the entire length of US 120 between US 22 in Reading and Northumberland was paved. In 1927, the road between US 1/PA 12 (now PA 472) in Oxford and Centralia was designated as part of PA 42, which continued north from Centralia to the New York border in South Waverly; PA 42 ran concurrent with US 120 between Reading and Centralia. The same year, PA 45 was designated concurrent with US 120 between Ashland and Shamokin, PA 55 was designated concurrent on the section of US 120 between Shamokin and Sunbury, and PA 14 was designated concurrent with US 120 between Sunbury and Northumberland. The concurrent state routes were removed from US 120 between Reading and Sunbury in 1928, with PA 14 remaining concurrent with US 120, which split PA 42 into two sections. The southern section of PA 42 ran along the road from US 1/PA 472 in Oxford north to US 222/PA 73 (now US 222 Bus.) in Reading, continuing south from Oxford to the Maryland border south of Chrome, while the northern section of PA 42 ran from US 120 in Centralia north to US 220 in Laporte. At this time, the entire length of PA 42 between Oxford and Reading was paved.

In May 1935, the eastern terminus of US 120 was truncated to US 220 in Lock Haven. US 122 was designated in April 1935 to run from US 1/PA 472 in Oxford north to US 11/US 111/PA 14 in Northumberland, replacing PA 42 between Oxford and Reading and US 120 between Reading and Northumberland, effective in May 1935. US 122 was rerouted to bypass Orwigsburg to the southwest by 1940, having previously followed Brick Hill Road, Market Street, and present-day PA 443 through the town. In the 1930s, US 122 was widened to a multilane road between Reading and Leesport, from a point north of Shoemakersville to Hamburg, between a point south of Schuylkill Haven and Pottsville, for a short distance south of Frackville, and for a short distance north of Shamokin. US 122 was upgraded to a multilane road in the 1940s between Leesport and north of Shoemakersville, between Port Clinton and south of Orwigsburg, between St. Clair and south of Frackville, between Frackville and Shamokin, between north of Weigh Scales and north of Paxinos, and for a short distance north of Stonington. In the 1940s, US 122 was realigned to bypass Center City Pottsville to the east along Pottsville Boulevard between US 209 in Pottsville and south of St. Clair, having previously followed Centre Street through Center City Pottsville and Nichols Street and Ann Street between Pottsville and St. Clair By 1953, US 122 was rerouted to bypass Hamburg to the west on a divided highway between south of Hamburg and Port Clinton, having previously followed Fourth Street and Port Clinton Avenue between Hamburg and Port Clinton. US 122 was upgraded to a divided highway in the 1950s between north of Leesport and north of Shoemakersville, along the bypass of Orwigsburg, from north of St. Clair to south of Frackville, between Ashland and the border between Columbia and Northumberland counties, and between Weigh Scales and Paxinos. In the 1950s, US 122 was upgraded to a divided highway from Schuylkill Haven through Pottsville to south of St. Clair, being realigned to bypass Mount Carbon. This alignment of US 122 bypassed the previous alignment that followed Centre Street through Mount Carbon north to US 209 in Pottsville.

On July 19, 1955, the American Association of State Highway Officials (AASHO) approved the removal of the US 122 designation between Oxford and Morgantown, with the southern terminus of the route moved to Morgantown. PA 10 was designated along the former alignment of US 122 between US 1/PA 472 in Oxford and PA 23 in Morgantown. On December 1, 1962, AASHO approved the elimination of the US 122 designation; US 122 was decommissioned in 1963. The section of US 122 between PA 23 in Morgantown and US 222 in Reading became a northern extension of PA 10, the route was removed from a concurrency with US 222 through Reading, the section between US 222 in Reading and PA 147 in Sunbury was designated PA 61, and the section between PA 61 in Sunbury and US 11 in Northumberland became part of PA 147 (now PA 405).

== Major intersections ==
This table shows the intersections of US 122 as they existed in 1950.

County	Location	mi	km	Destinations	Notes
Chester	Oxford			US 1 / PA 472 south (South 3rd Street/Market Street) – Lewisville	Southern terminus; south end of PA 472 overlap
Chester	Oxford			PA 472 north (Lancaster Avenue) – Quarryville	North end of PA 472 overlap
Chester	Upper Oxford Township			PA 896 (Newark Road) – Octoraro, New London	
Chester	Upper Oxford Township			PA 926 east (Street Road) – London Grove	Western terminus of PA 926
Chester	West Fallowfield Township			PA 41 (Gap Newport Pike) – Atglen, Avondale	
Chester	Parkesburg			PA 372 (First Avenue) – Parkesburg, Coatesville	
Chester	Sadsbury Township			US 30 east (Lincoln Highway) – Coatesville	South end of US 30 overlap
Chester	Sadsbury Township			US 30 west (Lincoln Highway) – Lancaster	North end of US 30 overlap
Chester	West Caln Township			PA 340 east (West Kings Highway) – Wagontown	South end of PA 340 overlap
Chester	West Caln Township			PA 340 west (West Kings Highway) – Lancaster	North end of PA 340 overlap
Chester	Honey Brook			US 322 (Horseshoe Pike) – Beartown, Downingtown	
Lancaster	Caernarvon Township			PA 23 west (Main Street) – Lancaster	South end of PA 23 overlap
Berks	Caernarvon Township			PA 23 east (Main Street) – Elverson	North end of PA 23 overlap
Berks	Reading			US 222 south / PA 73 west (Lancaster Avenue) – Lancaster	South end of US 222/PA 73 overlap
Berks	Reading			PA 73 east (Bingaman Street)	North end of PA 73 overlap
Berks	Reading			US 422 / PA 83 (Penn Street)	
Berks	Reading			US 222 north (5th Street) – Allentown	North end of US 222 overlap
Berks	Leesport			PA 383 west (East Wall Street) – Bernville	South end of PA 383 overlap
Berks	Leesport			PA 383 east (Shackamaxon Street)	North end of PA 383 overlap
Berks	Shoemakersville			PA 662 south (Moselem Springs Road) – Moselem Springs	Northern terminus of PA 662
Berks	Hamburg			US 22 (State Street) – Harrisburg, Allentown	
Schuylkill	West Brunswick Township			PA 895 east – McKeansburg, New Ringgold	South end of PA 895 overlap
Schuylkill	Deer Lake			PA 895 west – Auburn	North end of PA 895 overlap
Schuylkill	North Manheim Township			PA 443 east – Orwigsburg, New Ringgold	South end of PA 443 overlap
Schuylkill	Schuylkill Haven			PA 443 west (Dock Street) – Pine Grove	North end of PA 443 overlap
Schuylkill	North Manheim Township			PA 83 south (Pottsville Street) – Cressona	Northern terminus of PA 83
Schuylkill	Pottsville			US 209 south (South Centre Street) – Tremont	South end of US 209 overlap
Schuylkill	Pottsville			US 209 north (Mauch Chunk Street) – Tamaqua	North end of US 209 overlap
Schuylkill	Frackville			PA 924 north (Lehigh Avenue) – Shenandoah	Southern terminus of PA 924
Schuylkill	Ashland			PA 45 east (Centre Street) – Shenandoah	Western terminus of PA 45
Schuylkill	Ashland			PA 54 west (Centre Street) – Locust Gap	Eastern terminus of PA 54
Columbia	Centralia			PA 42 north (Locust Street) – Bloomsburg	Southern terminus of PA 42
Northumberland	Mount Carmel			PA 54 east (Chestnut Street)	South end of PA 54 overlap
Northumberland	Mount Carmel Township			PA 54 west – Danville	North end of PA 54 overlap
Northumberland	Shamokin			PA 125 south (Market Street)	Northern terminus of PA 125
Northumberland	Coal Township			PA 225 south – Trevorton	Northern terminus of PA 225
Northumberland	Shamokin Township			PA 742 east – Elysburg	Western terminus of PA 742
Northumberland	Upper Augusta Township			PA 890 south – Trevorton	Northern terminus of PA 890
Northumberland	Sunbury			PA 242 east (North 11th Street) – Snydertown	Western terminus of PA 242
Northumberland	Sunbury			PA 14 south (Front Street) – Millersburg	South end of PA 14 overlap
Northumberland	Northumberland			US 11 / PA 14 north (Water Street) – Selinsgrove, Milton, Bloomsburg	Northern terminus; north end of PA 14 overlap
1.000 mi = 1.609 km; 1.000 km = 0.621 mi: Concurrency terminus
