= Pennsylvania Route 61 =

State highway in Pennsylvania, US

Pennsylvania Route 61
- PA 61 mainline in red, PA 61 Truck routes in blue, and the route's abandoned section in grey

Route information
- Maintained by PennDOT and Reading
- Length: 81.801 mi (131.646 km)
- Existed: 1963–present

Major junctions
- South end: US 222 Bus. in Reading
- PA 12 near Reading; US 222 near Reading; PA 73 near Leesport; I-78 / US 22 near Hamburg; PA 443 in Schuylkill Haven; US 209 in Pottsville; I-81 in Frackville; PA 54 in Ashland; PA 42 in Centralia; PA 147 in Sunbury
- North end: US 11 / US 15 / PA 147 in Shamokin Dam

Location
- Country: United States
- State: Pennsylvania
- Counties: Berks, Schuylkill, Columbia, Northumberland, Snyder

Highway system
- Pennsylvania State Route System; Interstate; US; State; Scenic; Legislative
← PA 60	→ US 62

Pennsylvania Route 61 (PA 61) is an 81.8-mile-long (131.6 km) state highway that is located in Pennsylvania in the United States. The route is signed north-south despite running in a northwest-southeast direction from U.S. Route 222 Business (US 222 Bus.) in Reading to US 11/US 15/PA 147 in Shamokin Dam.

PA 61 heads north from Reading through Berks County to Hamburg, where it meets Interstate 78 (I-78)/US 22. The route continues into the Coal Region in Schuylkill County and heads through Schuylkill Haven, Pottsville, Frackville, where it has an interchange with I-81, and Ashland.

PA 61 passes through the southern part of Columbia County, where it turns west in Centralia, before it heads into Northumberland County and runs west through Mount Carmel, Kulpmont, Shamokin, and Sunbury. The route crosses the Susquehanna River into Snyder County and soon reaches its northern terminus.

PA 61 roughly follows the alignment of the Centre Turnpike, a turnpike from Reading to Sunbury that was completed in 1814. The road between Reading and Sunbury became part of US 120 when the U.S. Highway System was created in 1926. In 1935, this section of road became part of US 122, a route than ran from US 1 in Oxford north to US 11/US 111 in Northumberland.

US 122 saw multiple upgrades and realignments in the following years. In 1963, US 122 was decommissioned and PA 61 was designated onto the former alignment of US 122 between US 222 (now US 222 Bus.) in Reading and PA 147 in Sunbury. Upgrades and realignments continued to be made to PA 61. In 1990, the route was extended north from Sunbury to US 11/US 15 in Shamokin Dam. A section of PA 61 south of Centralia was closed in 1993 after the Centralia mine fire damaged the road and made it unsafe to travel on; this section was bypassed with a realignment to a parallel road through Byrnesville. The closed section of PA 61 was used by pedestrians and bicyclists and was covered with graffiti before being blocked to public access and covered with dirt in 2020.

== Route description ==
=== Berks County ===
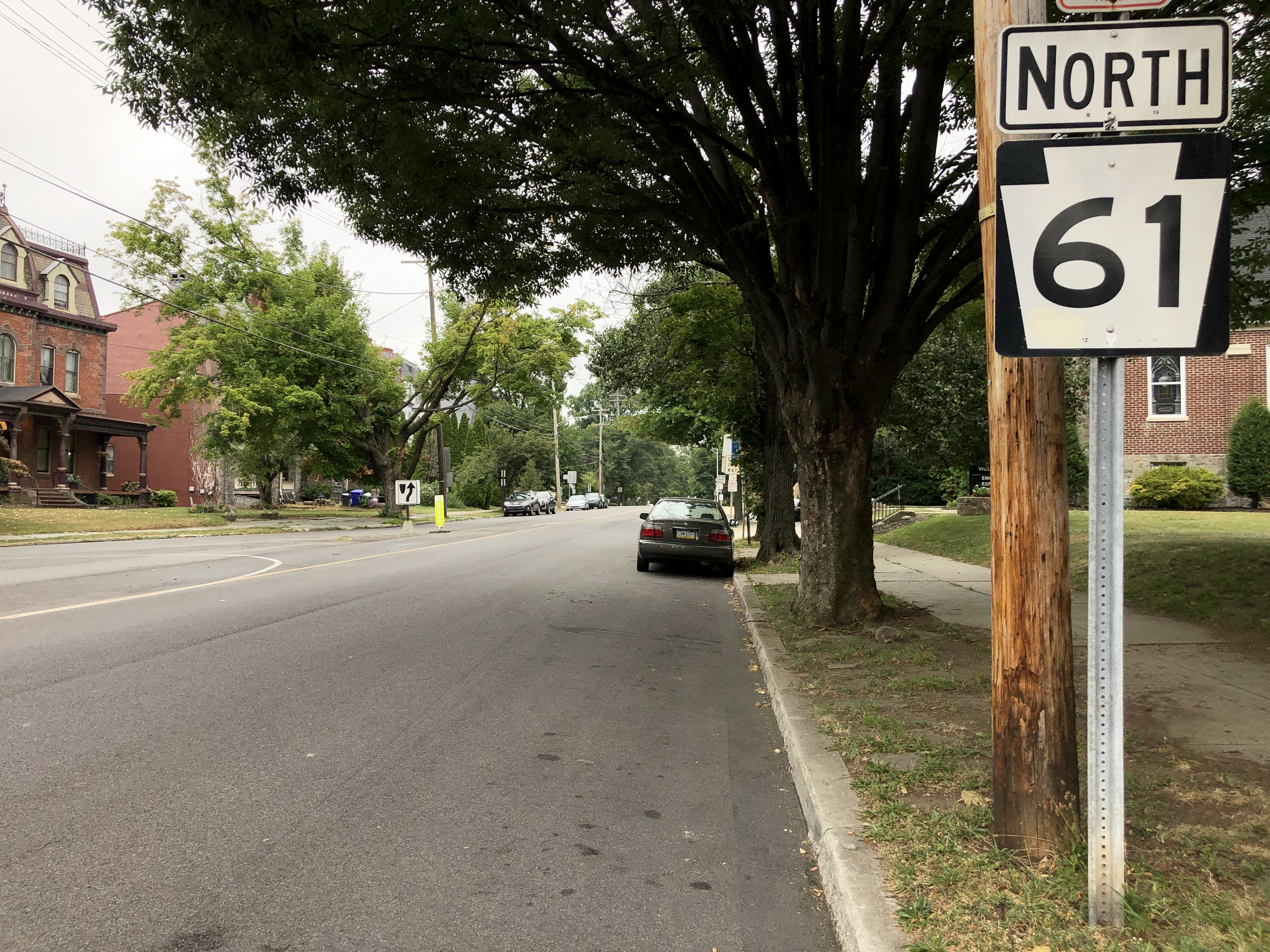
PA 61 northbound past Greenwich Street in Reading

PA 61 begins at US 222 Bus. in Reading in Berks County, and heads west on two-lane undivided Greenwich Street, a road that is maintained by the city. This road intersects Centre Avenue and North 4th Street a short distance apart, at which points the route briefly splits into the one-way pair of Centre Avenue northbound and North 4th Street southbound and becomes state-maintained. At the intersection of North 4th Street and Centre Avenue, both directions of PA 61 continue northwest on two-lane undivided Centre Avenue, passing through urban areas of homes.

The road becomes three lanes with one northbound lane and two southbound lanes and curves north, running between residences and businesses to the west and a large cemetery to the east. The route narrows to two lanes and continues past urban development. PA 61 heads into commercial areas and widens to four lanes, crossing Norfolk Southern's Spruce Street Industrial Track at-grade before passing to the east of FirstEnergy Stadium, the home ballpark of Minor League Baseball's Reading Fightin Phils. The road heads into Muhlenberg Township and becomes a divided highway as it reaches a partial cloverleaf interchange with the PA 12 freeway (Warren Street Bypass).

Past this interchange, the route continues north into suburban areas as Pottsville Pike, a four-lane divided highway with some intersections controlled by jughandles. PA 61 heads past businesses and passes under Norfolk Southern's Reading Line. The road becomes undivided and runs through more commercial areas. The route briefly becomes a divided highway again at the Bellevue Avenue intersection, heading to the west of the Reading Outer Station along the Reading Blue Mountain and Northern Railroad.

The highway transitions to a three-lane road with a center left-turn lane and passes under the Reading Blue Mountain and Northern Railroad's Reading Division line. PA 61 runs past businesses and industrial development before it heads through Tuckerton, where it passes homes and businesses.

The road becomes a four-lane divided highway as it comes to a partial cloverleaf interchange with the US 222 freeway. Following this, the route enters Ontelaunee Township and runs along the east bank of the Schuylkill River as it passes through Ontelaunee. PA 61 heads farther from the river and crosses under a Reading Blue Mountain and Northern Railroad line, entering industrial areas and passing west of the Ontelaunee Energy Facility. The road heads near more commercial development and curves northwest, crossing Maiden Creek. The route runs through farmland and comes to an intersection with the western terminus of PA 73.

Past this intersection, PA 61 passes a mix of businesses and fields before it enters the borough of Leesport. Here, the road turns into four-lane undivided South Centre Avenue and runs past homes and some businesses. The route becomes North Centre Avenue and passes more residences, running to the east of a Reading Blue Mountain and Northern Railroad line.

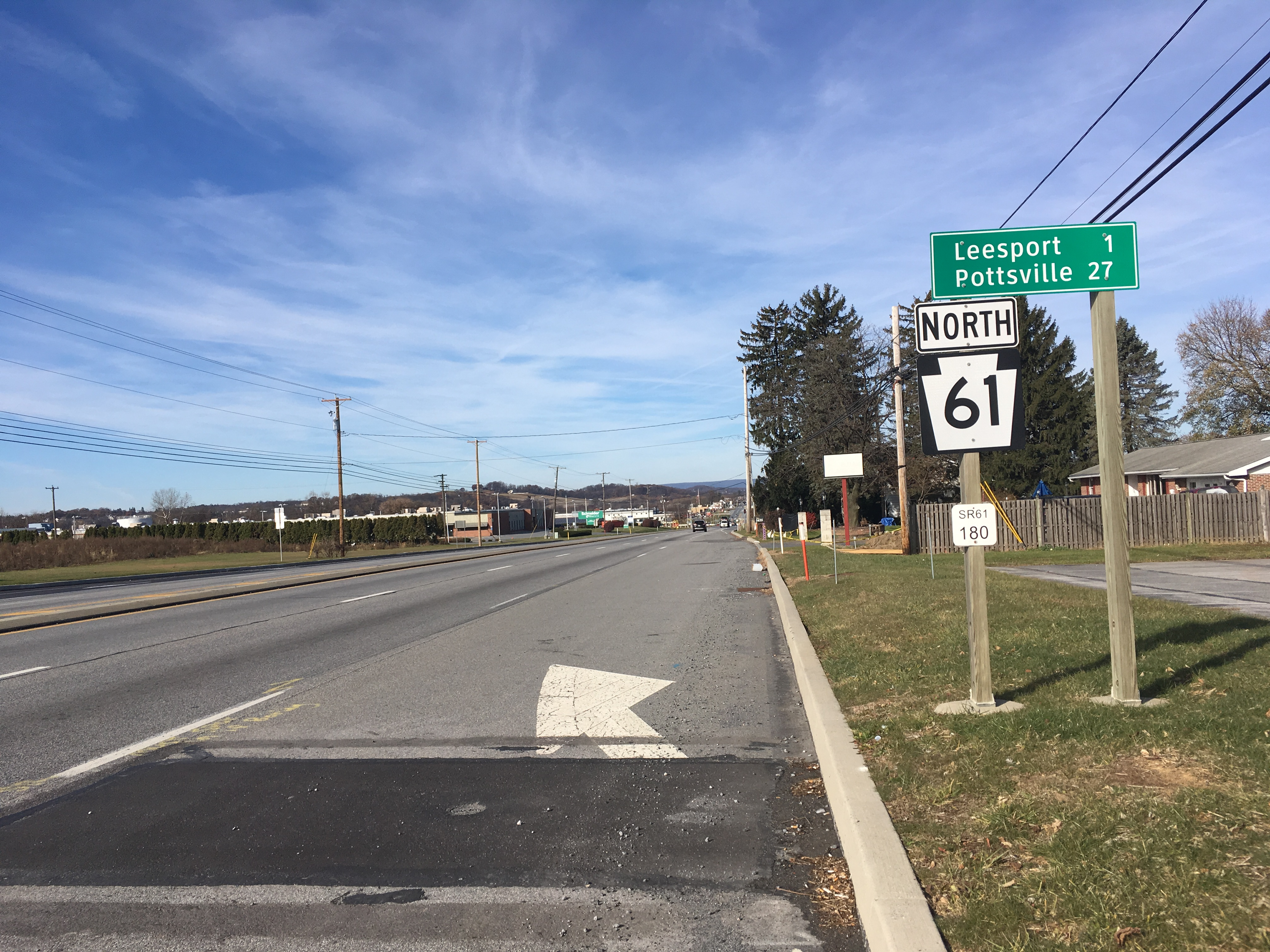
PA 61 northbound past PA 73 near Leesport

PA 61 leaves Leesport for Ontelaunee Township again, where it becomes four-lane divided Pottsville Pike and passes a few businesses. The road curves north and heads through a mix of fields and woods with some residential and commercial development to the east of the railroad tracks, with the Schuylkill River further to the west, bending northeast and entering Perry Township. The route curves north and continues through rural land with some industrial development, where it crosses a railroad spur at-grade, before the river and railroad tracks head further to the west.

PA 61 then runs through more farmland and woodland before it becomes the border between the borough of Shoemakersville to the west and Perry Township to the east, passing businesses and coming to an intersection with the northern terminus of PA 662. From here, the road fully enters Shoemakersville before crossing into Perry Township, heading north-northwest past homes and businesses with some farmland.

The route becomes undivided and curves north in a wooded area, entering Windsor Township and passing more roadside development. PA 61 crosses into the borough of Hamburg and runs past businesses as a four-lane divided highway. The road comes to an intersection with South 4th Street, which heads north into the center of the borough. From here, the route curves northwest as an unnamed road and passes over a Reading Blue Mountain and Northern Railroad line, heading into wooded areas with the Schuylkill River to the southwest and businesses and industrial development to the northeast. The road passes over the river, entering Tilden Township, and continues over Old Route 22 and the Reading Blue Mountain and Northern Railroad's Reading Division line.

PA 61 comes to a partial cloverleaf interchange with I-78/US 22 and heads past businesses, passing east of a 250,000-square-foot (23,000 m^{2}) Cabela's store. The road runs through farm fields before it enters forested areas, crossing over the Schuylkill River Trail and coming to a bridge over the Reading Blue Mountain and Northern Railroad's Reading Division line and the Schuylkill River.

=== Schuylkill County ===
Upon crossing the Schuylkill River, PA 61 enters the borough of Port Clinton in Schuylkill County and passes over the Appalachian Trail before heading through the Schuylkill Gap in forested Blue Mountain along with the river. The road becomes Center Street and curves north, running between homes and some businesses to the west and the mountain to the east. The route heads into West Brunswick Township, becoming Centre Turnpike and heading north through forested mountains with the Little Schuylkill River to the west and a tract of Weiser State Forest to the east. PA 61 heads through a mix of fields and woods and passes over the river and the Reading Blue Mountain and Northern Railroad's Reading Division line before coming to a jughandle-controlled intersection with PA 895 in Molino.

At this point, PA 895 joins PA 61 for a concurrency and the two routes head northwest along a four-lane divided highway with a Jersey barrier, running through a mix of farm fields and woods. The road crosses into the borough of Deer Lake, passing through wooded areas with nearby residential neighborhoods. PA 895 splits from PA 61 at a jughandle-controlled intersection by heading southwest, with PA 61 splitting into a one-way pair carrying two lanes in each direction. The northbound direction heads past development while the southbound direction bypasses the development to the west, leaving Deer Lake for West Brunswick Township and heading through Pinedale.

The route becomes a four-lane divided highway with a Jersey barrier and some intersections controlled by jughandles, continuing northwest past fields and woods with some residential and commercial development. PA 61 curves to the west and becomes a four-lane undivided road, passing south of Geisinger St. Luke's Hospital, before becoming a three-lane road with one northbound lane and two southbound lanes and entering North Manheim Township. The route becomes three lanes with two northbound lanes and one southbound lanes before transitioning to a four-lane road as it passes south of the borough of Orwigsburg, briefly becoming three lanes with one northbound lane and two southbound lanes at the Greenview Road intersection. The road becomes a four-lane divided highway and reaches PA 443 at a jughandle-controlled intersection.

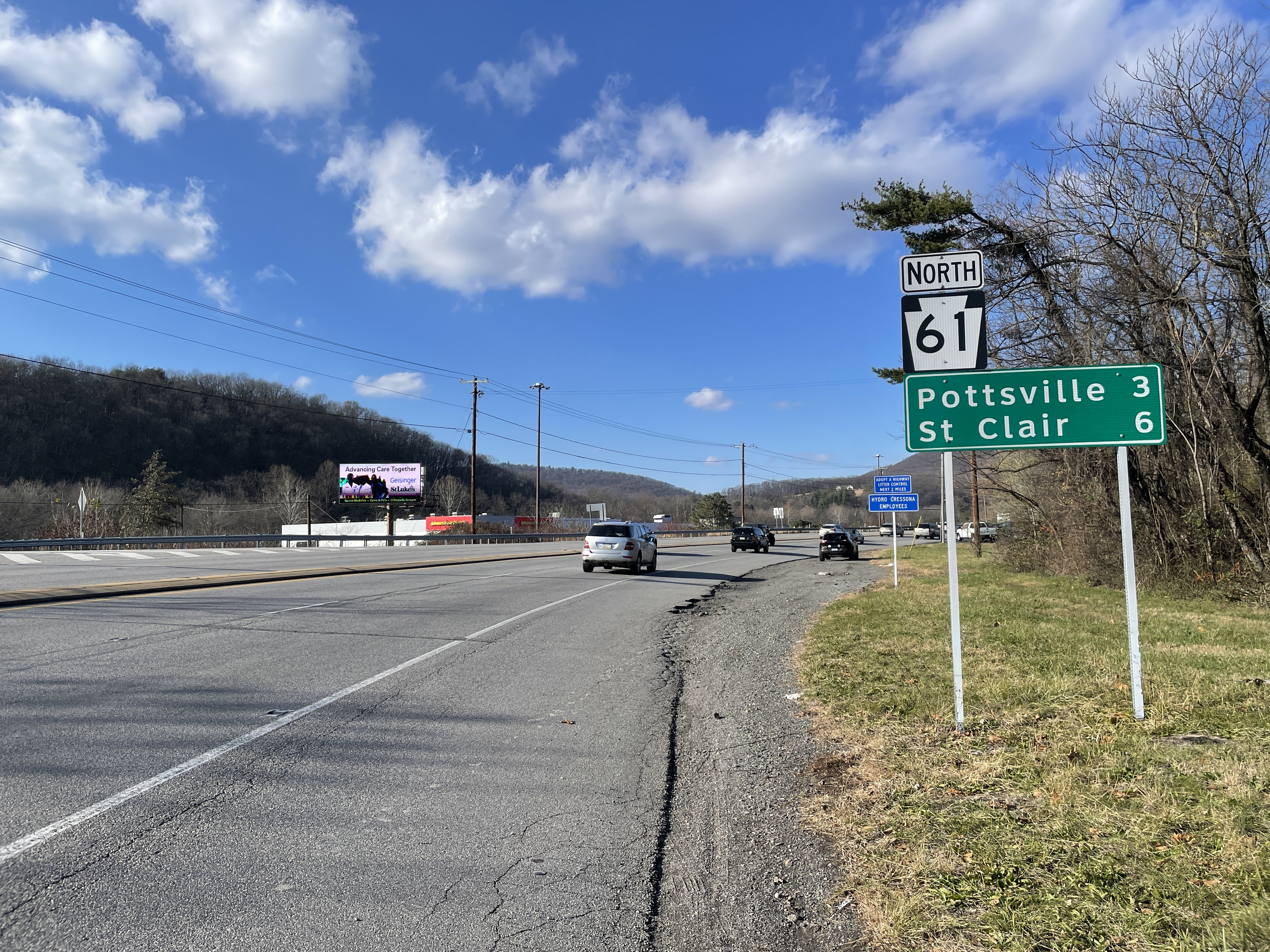
PA 61 northbound past PA 183 in North Manheim Township

At this point, PA 443 heads west for a concurrency with PA 61, and the two routes run west-southwest through business areas as Center Avenue. The road passes to the south of the Penn State Schuylkill university campus before it continues past more development. The two routes enter the borough of Schuylkill Haven and become a four-lane undivided road, passing homes. PA 443 splits to the south and PA 61 continues west, passing businesses and crossing back into North Manheim Township. The route widens to a four-lane divided highway with several intersections controlled by jughandles and comes to an intersection with the northern terminus of PA 183 east of the borough of Cressona. Here, the road curves north and becomes unnamed, passing between the Cressona Mall and businesses to the west and woodland to the east. PA 61 continues north a short distance to the east of the Schuylkill River and passes through a narrow valley straddling Second Mountain and Sharp Mountain.

Farther north, the route continues through wooded areas with some development and bends northwest, intersecting Centre Street, which crosses the Schuylkill River into the borough of Mount Carbon. PA 61 passes through a section of the borough of Palo Alto before it comes to a bridge over a Reading Blue Mountain and Northern Railroad line and enters Pottsville. Here, the road becomes South Claude A. Lord Boulevard and passes near commercial development, crossing the Schuylkill River before coming to an intersection with US 209.

Past this intersection, PA 61 turns into a four-lane undivided road and runs past businesses to the east of Center City Pottsville, with the road name changing to North Claude A. Lord Boulevard after crossing East Norwegian Street. The route heads near residential and commercial development with some wooded areas, becoming a divided highway and curving to the northeast. The road turns north and leaves Pottsville for Norwegian Township, passing through woodland as Pottsville-St. Clair Highway. PA 61 heads into business areas and passes to the east of Fairlane Village Mall, entering East Norwegian Township. The route bends north-northwest and enters the borough of St. Clair, where it becomes Joseph H. Long Boulevard and runs between wooded areas to the west and residential areas to the east, curving to the north and passing west of a shopping center.

PA 61 leaves St. Clair for New Castle Township and becomes an unnamed four-lane undivided highway that heads into forested mountains to the west of Mill Creek. The road curves northwest and transitions into a three lane road with one northbound lane and two southbound lanes that reaches Darkwater, where it turns to the north.

The route becomes four lanes again and continues through forests, turning into a divided highway. PA 61 turns northwest and the median widens as it winds north through mountainous areas, becoming Skyline Drive and crossing into Blythe Township. The divided road curves to the northwest through more woodland before it comes to an interchange with Schuylkill Mall Road that provides access to a commercial area to the west of the road. The median of the route narrows and it continues into Ryan Township, reaching a cloverleaf interchange with I-81.

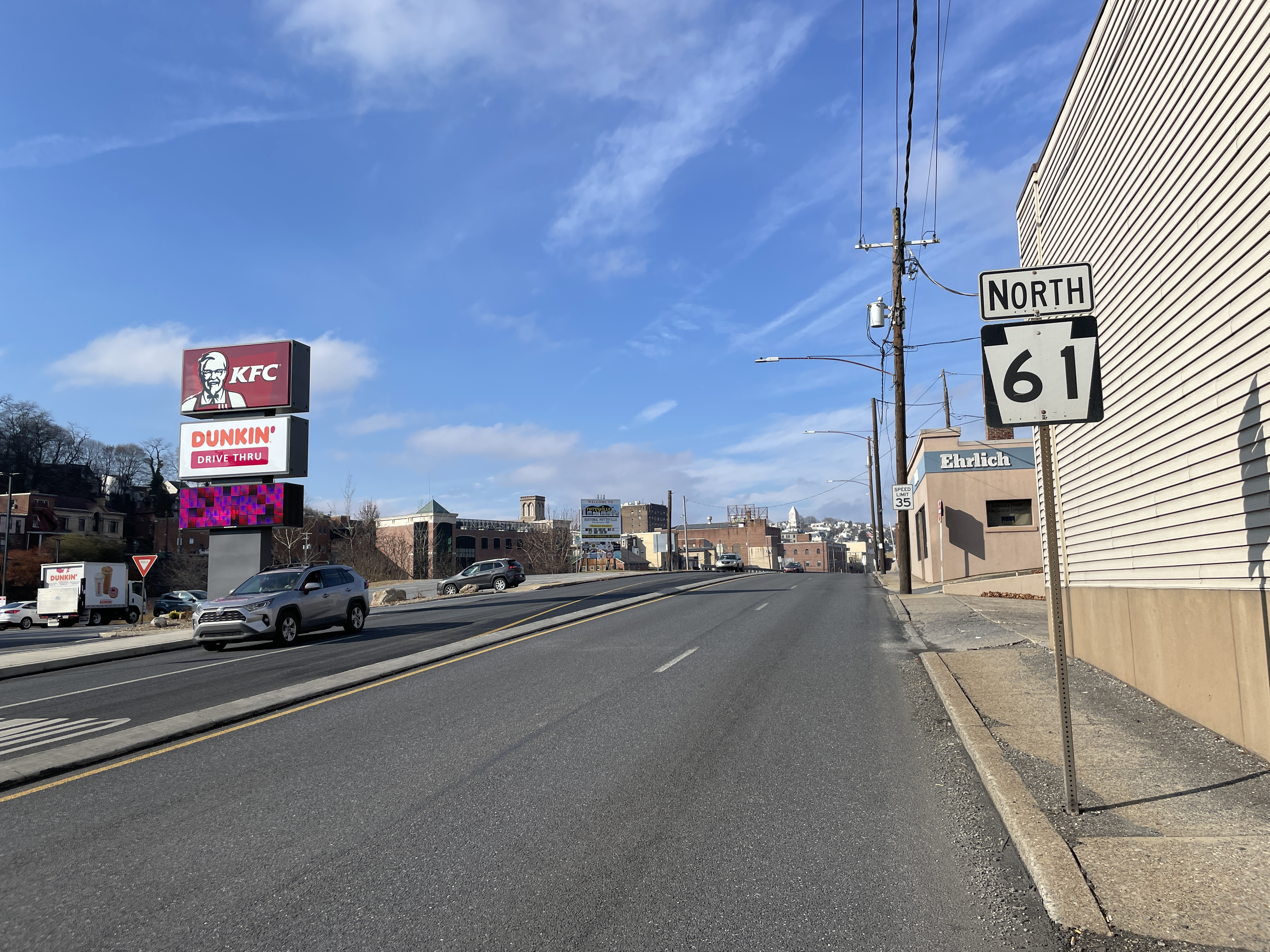
PA 61 northbound past US 209 in Pottsville

Past this interchange, PA 61 enters West Mahanoy Township and becomes South Lehigh Avenue, running north-northwest past businesses. The route narrows to a two-lane undivided road and heads into the borough of Frackville, where it is lined with homes and a few businesses. In the commercial downtown, PA 61 turns west-southwest onto West Oak Street, with PA 924 continuing north on South Lehigh Avenue. PA 61 continues past residences and a few businesses before it leaves Frackville for Butler Township and runs through Englewood.

The road heads into forested mountain areas and winds to the west, passing to the north of Ashland Reservoir before gaining a second southbound lane. The route straightens out and heads west as a three-lane road with a center left-turn lane, passing some homes and heading north of North Schuylkill Junior Senior High School. Farther west, the road becomes three lanes with one northbound lane and two southbound lanes before narrowing to two lanes. PA 61 becomes Fountain Street and heads west-southwest to Fountain Springs, where it runs through residential areas and turns northwest onto Broad Street.

The road gains a center turn lane and runs through forests with some homes, curving to the north. The route enters the borough of Ashland and becomes South Hoffman Boulevard, passing near commercial development and curving northeast to cross a Reading Blue Mountain and Northern Railroad line at-grade and Mahanoy Creek. PA 61 turns north and becomes a two-lane divided highway that runs through residential areas, coming to an intersection with PA 54.

At this point, PA 61 turns west to become concurrent with PA 54 on two-lane undivided Centre Street, heading through the commercial downtown of Ashland. Farther west, the road runs past homes. PA 61 splits from PA 54 by turning north onto four-lane divided North Memorial Boulevard, passing to the west of an industrial area before heading into forests.

=== Columbia County ===
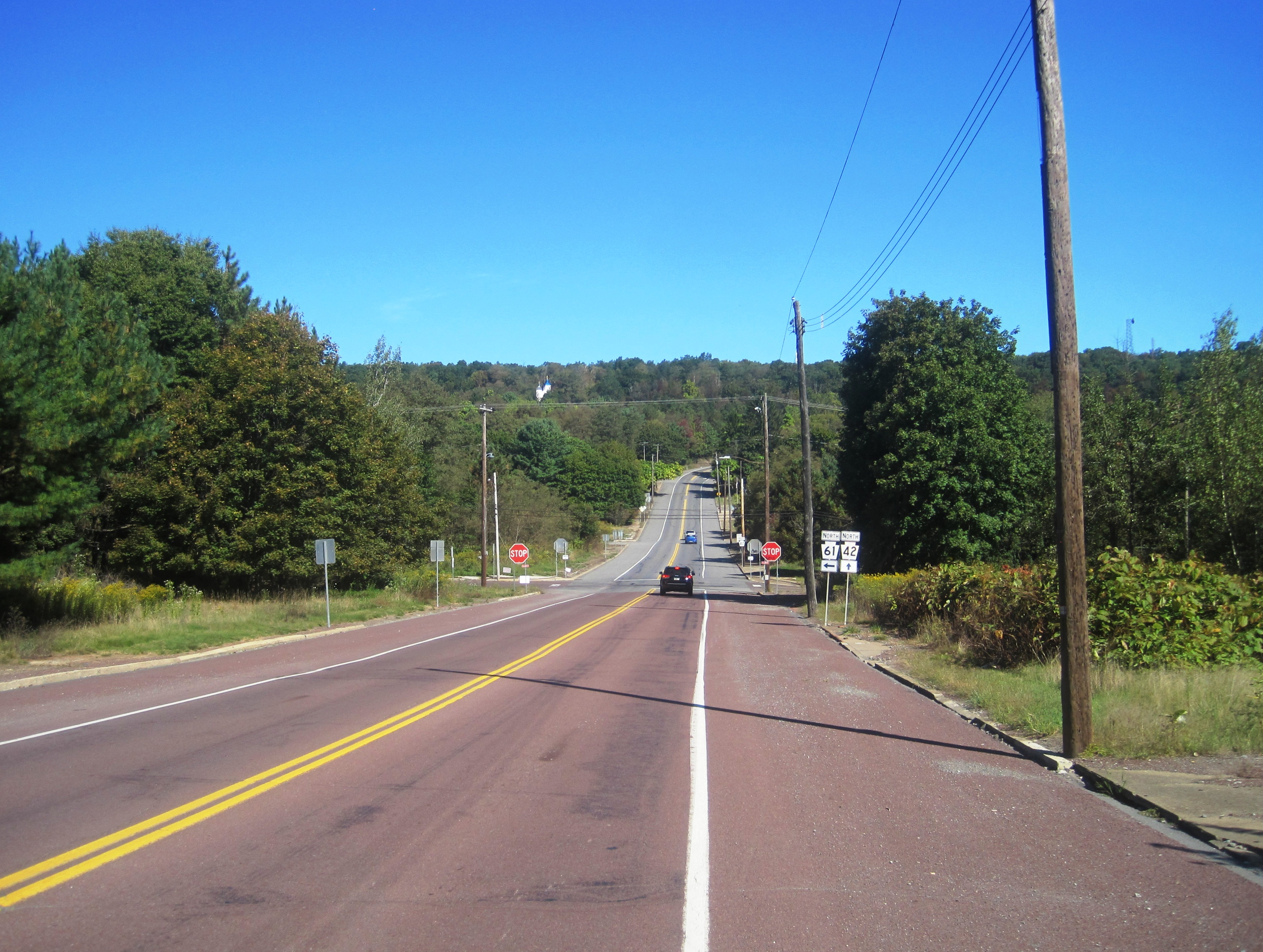
PA 61 northbound at PA 42 in Centralia

PA 61 enters Conyngham Township in Columbia County and heads northeast through dense forests as an unnamed four-lane undivided road. Farther northeast, the route narrows to a three lane road with one northbound lane and two southbound lanes. PA 61 curves east and becomes two-lane undivided Byrnesville Road, which is designated State Route 2002 (SR 2002), an unsigned quadrant route.

The former divided highway alignment of PA 61 past this point has been closed because of the Centralia mine fire that has made the road unsafe to travel on.

PA 61 follows Byrnesville Road northeast through forests before passing through the abandoned community of Byrnesville. The route curves northwest through more woods and rejoins the closed alignment, at which point SR 2002 ends.

At this point, PA 61 enters the borough of Centralia, which has largely been abandoned because of the mine fire, as two-lane undivided Locust Avenue. The road runs north through abandoned areas of the borough which have been overgrown with trees. PA 61 turns west onto West Centre Street, with PA 42 continuing north along Locust Avenue. From here, the route heads west through more abandoned sections of Centralia. The road leaves Centralia for Conyngham Township again and becomes an unnamed four-lane divided highway, heading through forested areas and passing to the south of a large coal mine.

=== Northumberland and Snyder counties ===
PA 61 enters Mount Carmel Township in Northumberland County and reaches a pair of jughandles at the county line before continuing west through forested areas. The route enters the borough of Mount Carmel and becomes two-lane undivided East 5th Street, lined with homes. PA 61 turns north onto four-lane South Market Street, passing residences and businesses. The road becomes North Market Street at the intersection with East 3rd Street. The route turns west onto two-lane East Mount Carmel Avenue and is lined with homes.

The road name changes to West Mount Carmel Avenue after the intersection with North Oak Street. PA 61 turns north onto North Poplar Street and crosses back into Mount Carmel Township, curving west and widening to a four-lane unnamed road that passes north of Atlas. The road heads past businesses and crosses PA 54 in Strong. The route passes north of homes in Strong as Front Street before it runs through wooded areas with some residential and commercial development. PA 61 heads into the borough of Kulpmont, becoming Chestnut Street and running past homes and businesses.

The road narrows to two lanes and runs through the commercial downtown of Kulpmont before running through more residential areas. The route leaves Kulpmont for Coal Township and becomes an unnamed four-lane road, passing through forested areas with some businesses. PA 61 passes to the north of Ranshaw and comes to a partial cloverleaf interchange with the western terminus of PA 901, which provides access to Ranshaw along with Coal Run to the north.

Following this interchange, the road continues through wooded areas and businesses, with several intersections controlled by jughandles, passing north of Marshallton. The route enters Shamokin and becomes two-lane undivided Mt. Carmel Street, heading northwest into residential areas. PA 61 turns west onto East Sunbury Street and runs past more homes and a few businesses, curving southwest.

The road becomes West Sunbury Street at the North 8th Street intersection and comes to a junction with the northern terminus of PA 125. From here, the route passes more development and turns northwest onto North 6th Street.

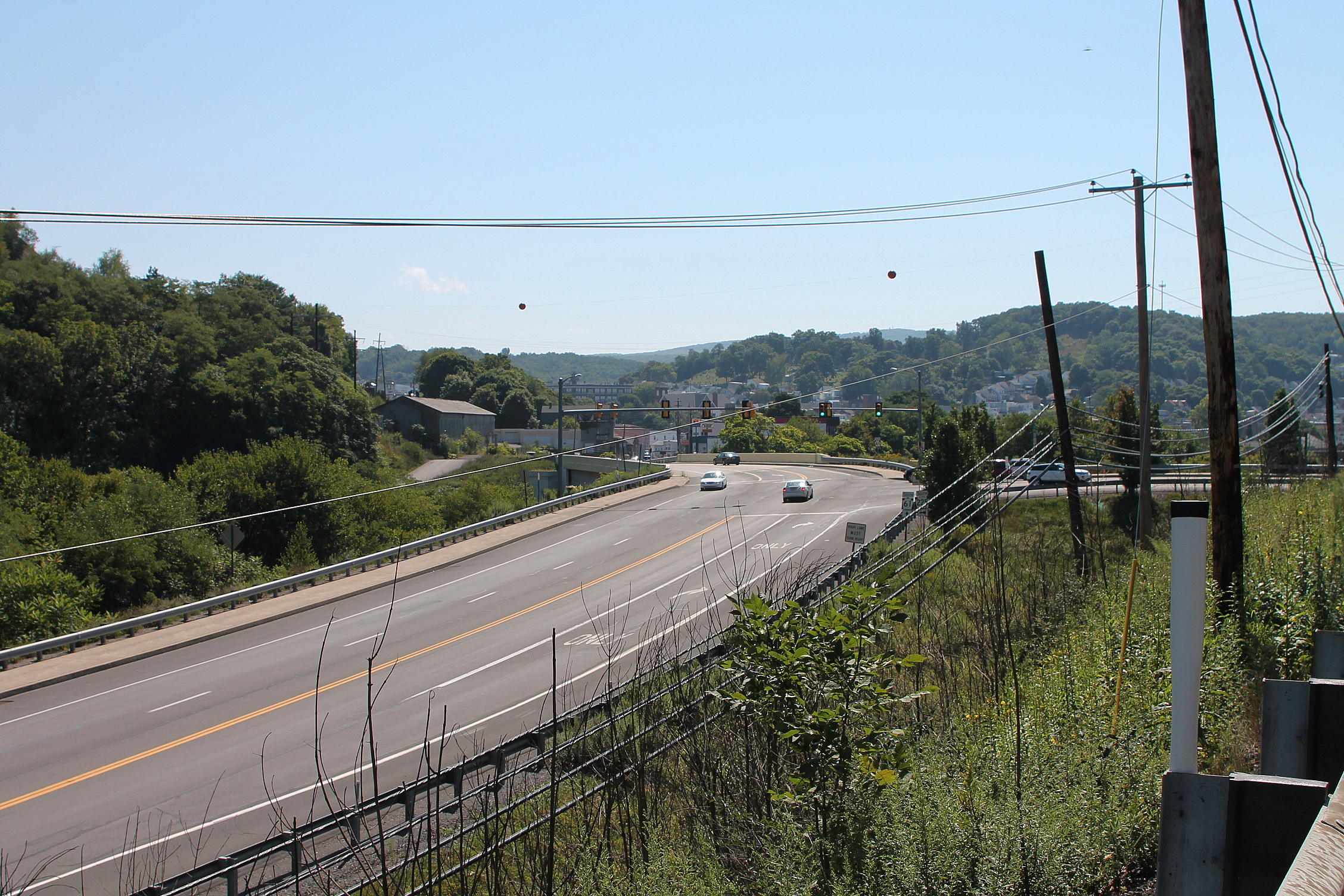
PA 61 southbound approaching PA 225 near Shamokin

PA 61 leaves Shamokin for Coal Township again, becoming an unnamed road and passing over the Shamokin Valley Railroad and the Shamokin Creek before coming to an intersection with the northern terminus of PA 225. The road curves north and runs through forested areas, with PA 225 parallel to the west and the creek and railroad line parallel to the east as it traverses a gap in Big Mountain. PA 225 curves away to the west and the route bends northwest and widens to a four-lane divided highway, passing southwest of Uniontown and curving to the west. PA 61 crosses the Shamokin Creek and turns to the north, heading through a gap in forested Little Mountain with the creek to the west and the Shamokin Valley Railroad to the east and entering Ralpho Township. The road passes commercial development and a coal mine in Weigh Scales before it crosses to the west side of the Shamokin Creek, at which point it enters Shamokin Township. The route winds north through more woodland with some commercial areas, with the Shamokin Valley Railroad and the Shamokin Creek to the east. PA 61 curves northwest and intersects the southern terminus of PA 487 in Paxinos. From here, the road curves west runs to the north of Snufftown before narrowing to a two-lane undivided road and heading through woodland. The route continues west through woodland with some farm fields and homes, running through Stonington and bending to the northwest.

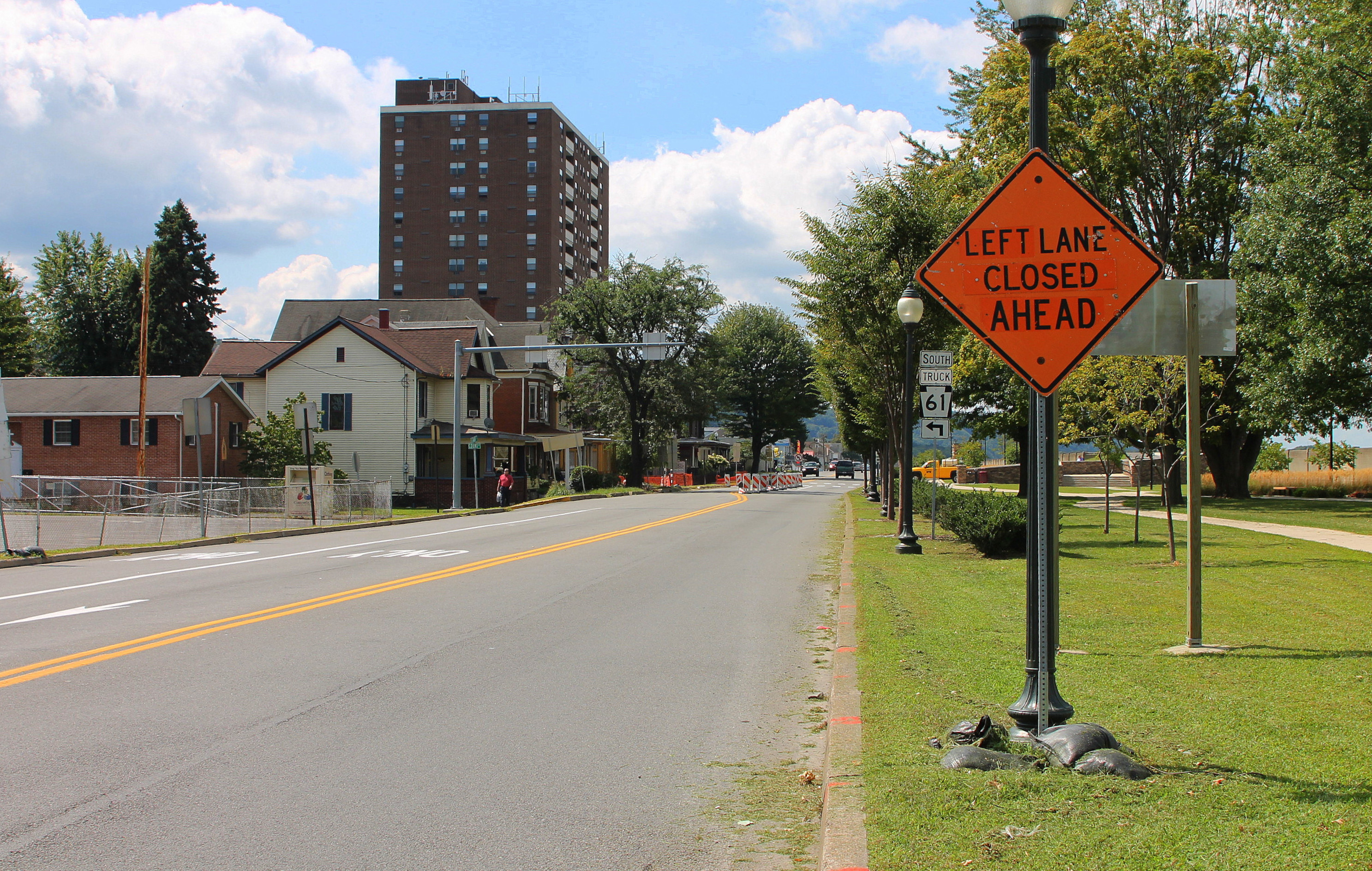
PA 61 northbound in Sunbury

PA 61 heads west and becomes the border between Upper Augusta Township to the north and Rockefeller Township to the south, passing through forests with some fields and residential development. The road fully enters Upper Augusta Township and runs through residential areas with some nearby farmland and woodland, becoming State Street. The route comes to an intersection with the northern terminus of PA 890 in Hamilton. From here, PA 61 turns north and crosses under the Shamokin Valley Railroad, at which point it enters the Sunbury. The road becomes Market Street and curves west, coming to a bridge over the Shamokin Creek. The route passes near businesses and bends southwest, coming to an intersection with the southern terminus of southbound PA 61 Truck at Wolverton Street. PA 61 curves west and becomes lined with homes, bending to the west-northwest and passing a mix of homes and businesses. The road enters the commercial downtown of Sunbury and intersects the beginning of northbound PA 61 Truck at North 5th Street. The route passes through more of the downtown and crosses Norfolk Southern's Buffalo Line at-grade, at which point it splits into a one-way pair with a town square between the one-way streets and passes north of the Northumberland County Courthouse. PA 61 becomes a two-lane road again and passes homes before it reaches an intersection with the southern terminus of PA 405 on the east bank of the Susquehanna River. At this point, PA 61 turns south-southwest onto South Front Street, intersecting the beginning of southbound PA 61 Truck at Chestnut Street. The route continues south between the river to the west and a mix of homes and commercial areas to the east. Farther south, the road runs to the west of residential areas. PA 61 comes to an interchange with PA 147, which becomes concurrent with PA 61. The two routes head west as a four-lane undivided road to cross the Susquehanna River on the Veterans Memorial Bridge, leaving Sunbury and running through Upper Augusta Township while crossing the river. Upon crossing the river, the road enters the borough of Shamokin Dam in Snyder County and comes to a trumpet interchange with US 11/US 15, where PA 61 reaches its northern terminus and PA 147 continues north along US 11/US 15.

== History ==
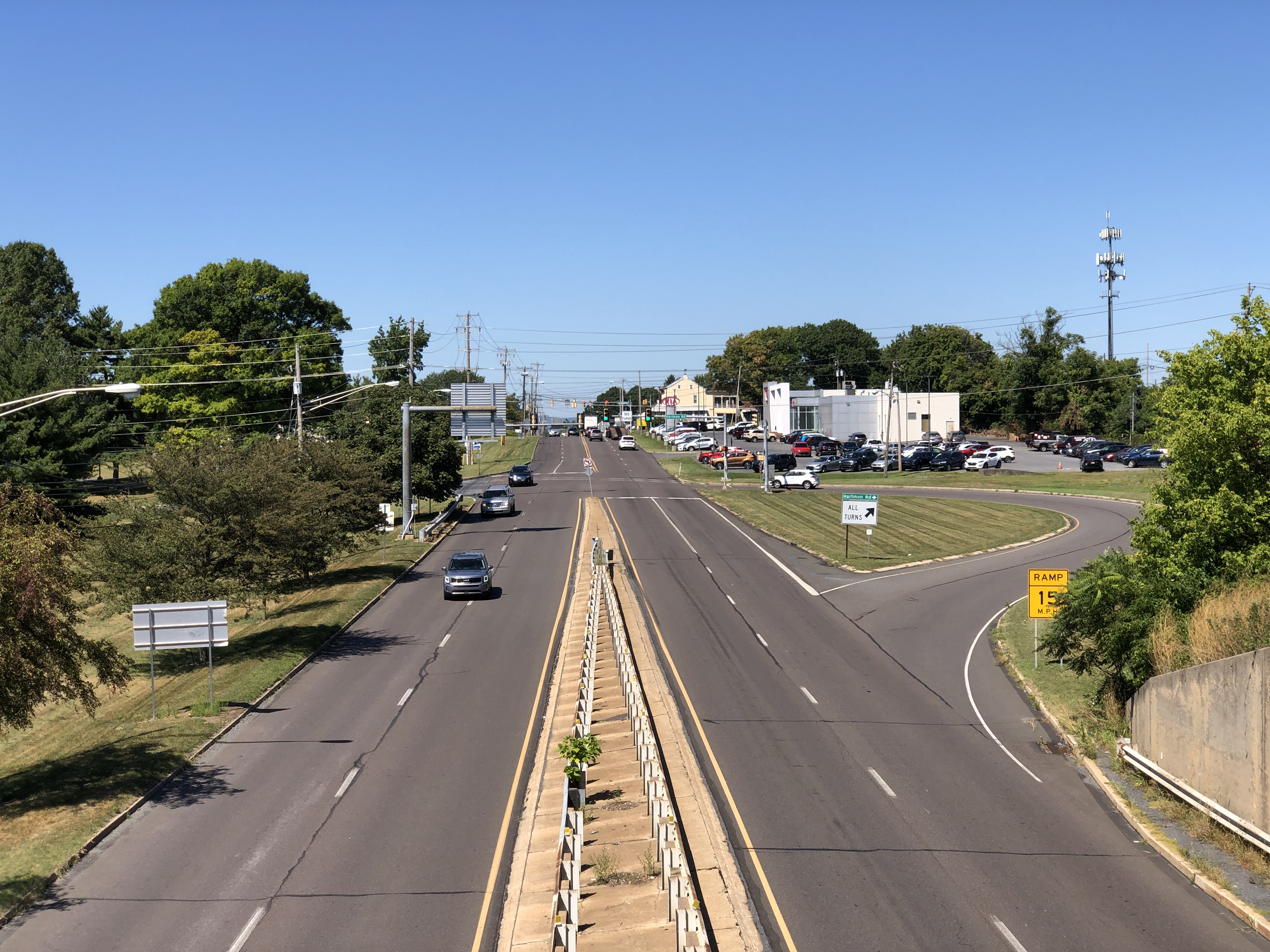
PA 61 northbound in Muhlenberg Township

On March 25, 1805, the Centre Turnpike Road Company was chartered to build the Centre Turnpike, a turnpike running from Reading northwest to Sunbury along the rough alignment of present-day PA 61. Construction of the Centre Turnpike began in 1808 and was completed in 1814. Following the passage of the Sproul Road Bill in 1911, what is now PA 61 was designated as Legislative Route 160 between Reading and Hamburg, Legislative Route 141 between Hamburg and Schuylkill Haven, Legislative Route 140 between Schuylkill Haven and Pottsville, and Legislative Route 161 between Pottsvile and Sunbury.

With the creation of the U.S. Highway System in 1926, the road between Reading and Sunbury was designated as part of US 120, a route that ran from Philadelphia northwest to Erie. At this time, the entire length of US 120 between US 22 in Reading and Sunbury was paved. In 1927, PA 42 was designated concurrent with US 120 between Reading and Centralia, PA 45 was designated concurrent with US 120 between Ashland and Shamokin, and PA 55 was designated concurrent on the section of US 120 between Shamokin and Sunbury. The concurrent state routes were removed from US 120 between Reading and Sunbury in 1928.

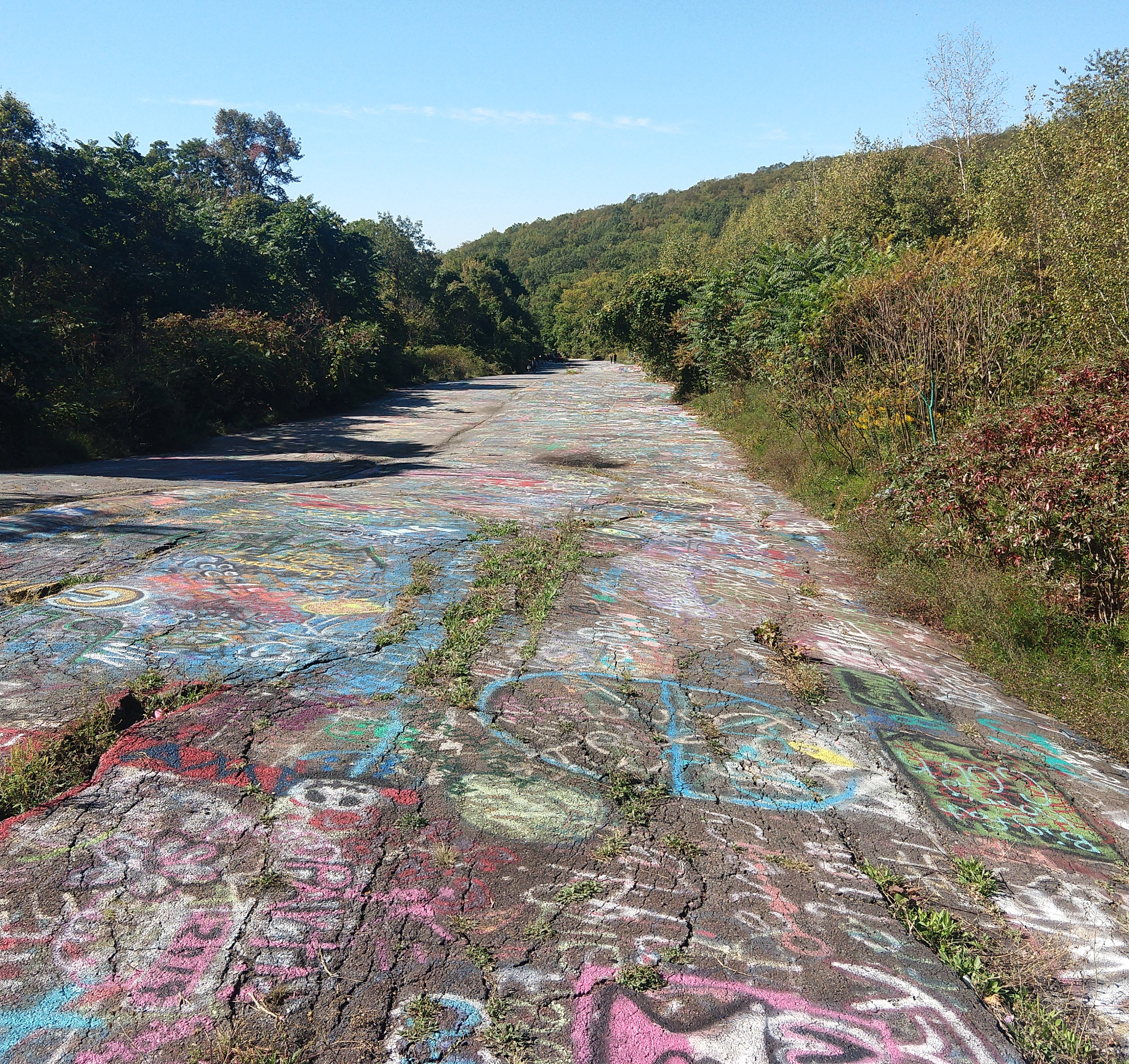
Abandoned section of PA 61 south of Centralia with the road surface covered with graffiti

In May 1935, the eastern terminus of US 120 was truncated to US 220 in Lock Haven. US 122 was designated in April 1935 to run from US 1 in Oxford north to US 11/US 111 in Northumberland, replacing PA 42 between Oxford and Reading and US 120 between Reading and Northumberland, effective in May 1935.

US 122 was rerouted to bypass Orwigsburg to the southwest by 1940, having previously followed Brick Hill Road, Market Street, and present-day PA 443 through the town. In the 1930s, US 122 was widened to a multilane road between Reading and Leesport, from a point north of Shoemakersville to Hamburg, between a point south of Schuylkill Haven and Pottsville, for a short distance south of Frackville, and for a short distance north of Shamokin. US 122 was upgraded to a multilane road in the 1940s between Leesport and north of Shoemakersville, between Port Clinton and south of Orwigsburg, between St. Clair and south of Frackville, between Frackville and Shamokin, between north of Weigh Scales and north of Paxinos, and for a short distance north of Stonington.

In the 1940s, US 122 was realigned to bypass Center City Pottsville to the east along Pottsville Boulevard between US 209 in Pottsville and south of St. Clair, having previously followed Centre Street through Center City Pottsville and Nichols Street and Ann Street between Pottsville and St. Clair By 1953, US 122 was rerouted to bypass Hamburg to the west on a divided highway between south of Hamburg and Port Clinton, having previously followed 4th Street and Port Clinton Avenue between Hamburg and Port Clinton. US 122 was upgraded to a divided highway in the 1950s between north of Leesport and north of Shoemakersville, along the bypass of Orwigsburg, from north of St. Clair to south of Frackville, between Ashland and the border between Columbia and Northumberland counties, and between Weigh Scales and Paxinos.

In the 1950s, US 122 was upgraded to a divided highway from Schuylkill Haven through Pottsville to south of St. Clair, being realigned to bypass Mount Carbon. This alignment of US 122 bypassed the previous alignment that followed Centre Street through Mount Carbon north to US 209 in Pottsville.

US 122, which had been replaced with PA 10 between Oxford and Morgantown in the 1950s, was decommissioned in 1963. The section of US 122 between Morgantown and Reading became a northern extension of PA 10 while the section between Reading and Sunbury was designated PA 61. When designated, PA 61 ran from US 222 (now US 222 Bus.) in Reading northwest to PA 147 (Front Street) in Sunbury. In 1966, PA 54 was designated concurrent with PA 61 between Ashland and north of Atlas. In the 1960s, PA 61 was upgraded to a divided highway between north of Tuckerton and north of Leesport, between north of Shoemakersville and south of Hamburg, and between Port Clinton and Deer Lake. The section of PA 61 through Pottsville was renamed Claude A. Lord Boulevard in the 1960s. By 1989, PA 61 was realigned to bypass St. Clair to the west along a divided highway, having previously followed 2nd Street through the town. In 1990, the northern terminus of PA 61 was extended from PA 147 in Sunbury across the Susquehanna River to US 11/US 15 in Shamokin Dam.

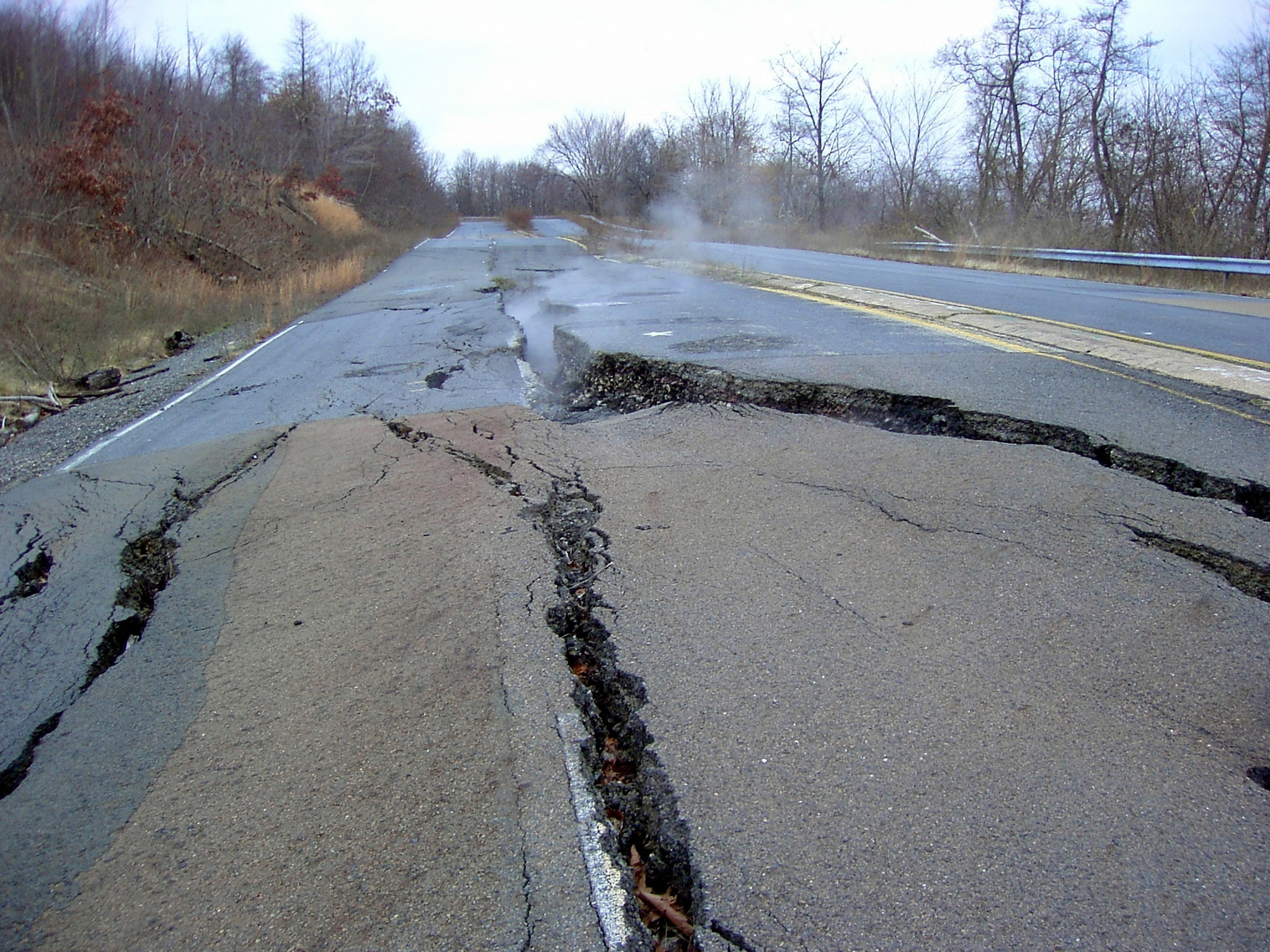
A view of the closed, damaged section of PA 61 south of Centralia

Because of the long-term coal mine fire in Centralia, the original alignment of PA 54/PA 61, which went from Centralia to Ashland, has been permanently closed because the road has severely opened up and buckled extensively. This branch was repaired in 1983 for $500,000; then in 1992 it was deemed too expensive to repair again. In 1993, the branch was permanently closed, and graffiti were scattered along the closed portion of the roadway. In 1999, Byrnesville Road (SR 2002), located directly south of the closed section of PA 61, was upgraded and now carries PA 61, bypassing the section of PA 61 which was damaged by the underground mine fire in Centralia.

By 2000, PA 54 was rerouted from PA 61 between Ashland and Atlas to bypass Centralia to the southwest along PA 901 and three quadrant routes. The closed section of the road was used by pedestrians and bicyclists and was covered with graffiti. The closed portion of PA 61 was known as "Graffiti Highway".

In 2018, the Pennsylvania Department of Transportation (PennDOT) vacated ownership of the closed section of PA 61, which reverted to adjacent property owners, mostly to Pitreal Corporation, a subsidiary of Pagnotti Enterprises. Work on blocking public access by covering the abandoned highway with dirt took place in April 2020.

In September 2012, PennDOT began a project to widen and improve the section of PA 61 through Deer Lake as the road saw a high accident rate. The project, which cost $35 million, widened the road from three lanes to four lanes between the south end of the PA 895 concurrency in Molino and Brick Hill Road north of Deer Lake and added traffic lights and jughandles at intersections. In addition, a new southbound roadway was built through Deer Lake, with the original roadway becoming the northbound lanes. The widening of PA 61 through Deer Lake was completed in 2015.

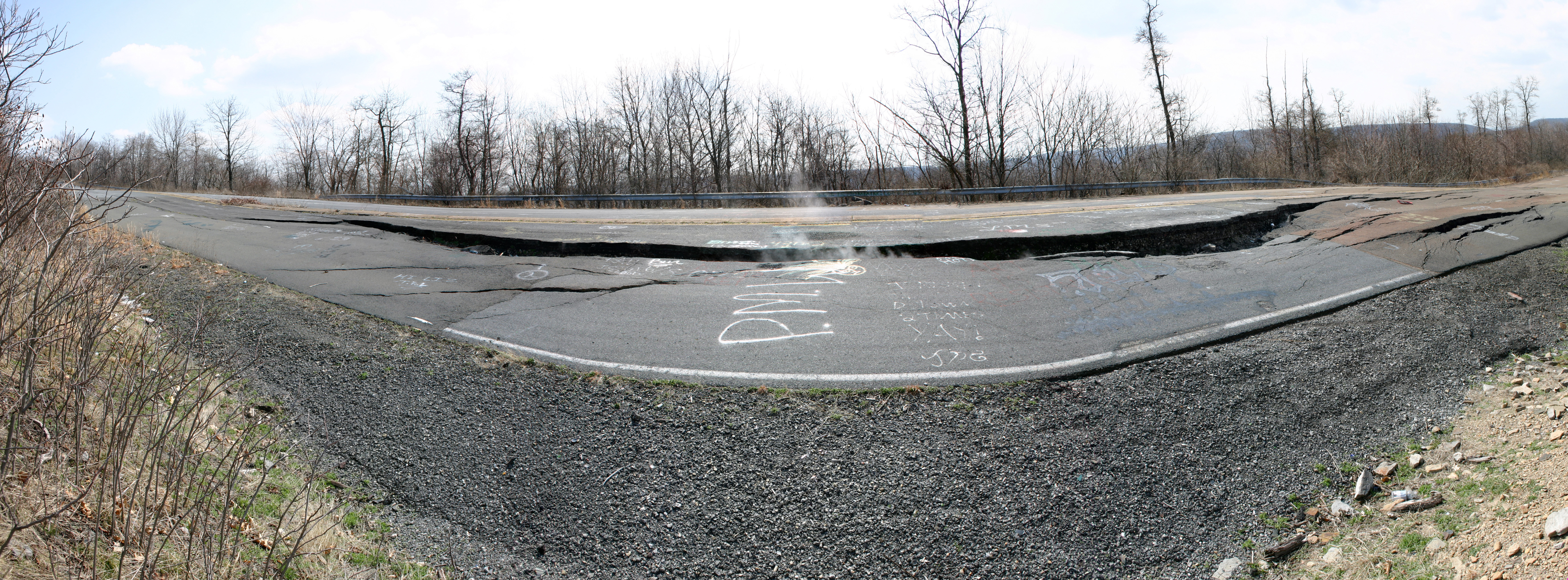
Panoramic view of the closed section of PA 61 south of Centralia

== Future ==
As part of the construction of the Central Susquehanna Valley Thruway, PA 61 is planned to continue westward from its current northern terminus, ending instead at a junction with a new limited-access roadway carrying US 15. PA 147 will run concurrent with PA 61 from Sunbury to the new northern terminus of PA 61 at US 15.

== Major intersections ==
County	Location	mi	km	Destinations	Notes
Berks	Reading	0.000	0.000	US 222 Bus.	Southern terminus
Berks	Muhlenberg Township	1.854	2.984	PA 12 – Pricetown, Lebanon	Interchange; no southbound exit to PA 12 eastbound or entrance from PA 12 westbound
Berks	Muhlenberg Township	4.761	7.662	US 222 – Allentown, Lancaster	Interchange
Berks	Ontelaunee Township	6.883	11.077	PA 73 east (Lake Shore Drive) – Maiden Creek, Oley	Western terminus of PA 73
Berks	Shoemakersville	12.126	19.515	PA 662 south (Moselem Springs Road) – Moselem Springs	Northern terminus of PA 662
Berks	Tilden Township	16.476	26.516	I-78 / US 22 – Harrisburg, Allentown	Exit 29 on I-78/US 22
Schuylkill	West Brunswick Township	20.855	33.563	PA 895 east – McKeansburg, New Ringgold	South end of PA 895 overlap
Schuylkill	Deer Lake	22.458	36.143	PA 895 west (Market Street) – Auburn	North end of PA 895 overlap
Schuylkill	North Manheim Township	27.477	44.220	PA 443 east – Orwigsburg, New Ringgold	South end of PA 443 overlap
Schuylkill	Schuylkill Haven	29.502	47.479	PA 443 west (Dock Street)	North end of PA 443 overlap
Schuylkill	North Manheim Township	29.849	48.037	PA 183 south to PA 443 west – Cressona	Northern terminus of PA 183
Schuylkill	Pottsville	33.188	53.411	US 209 (Mauch Chunk Street) – Tremont, Tamaqua	
Schuylkill	Blythe Township	40.307	64.868	Schuylkill Mall Road	Interchange
Schuylkill	Ryan Township	40.621– 40.645	65.373– 65.412	I-81 – Hazleton, Harrisburg	Exit 124 on I-81
Schuylkill	Frackville	41.441	66.693	PA 924 north – Shenandoah	Southern terminus of PA 924
Schuylkill	Ashland	48.226	77.612	PA 54 east – Shenandoah	South end of PA 54 overlap
Schuylkill	Ashland	49.209	79.194	PA 54 west – Locust Dale	North end of PA 54 overlap
Columbia	Centralia	51.322	82.595	PA 42 north – Bloomsburg	Southern terminus of PA 42
Northumberland	Mount Carmel Township	56.821	91.445	PA 54 to I-81 – Ashland, Danville	
Northumberland	Coal Township	61.348	98.730	PA 901 east to I-81 – Ranshaw, Coal Run	Interchange; western terminus of PA 901
Northumberland	Shamokin	63.524	102.232	PA 125 south	Northern terminus of PA 125
Northumberland	Coal Township	63.455	102.121	PA 225 south – Trevorton	Northern terminus of PA 225
Northumberland	Shamokin Township	68.332	109.970	PA 487 north – Elysburg	Southern terminus of PA 487
Northumberland	Upper Augusta Township	78.042	125.596	PA 890 south – Trevorton	Northern terminus of PA 890
Northumberland	Sunbury	78.723	126.692	PA 61 Truck south	Southern terminus of PA 61 Truck southbound
Northumberland	Sunbury	79.312	127.640	PA 61 Truck north (North 5th Street)	Southern terminus of PA 61 Truck northbound
Northumberland	Sunbury	79.732	128.316	PA 405 north (North Front Street) – Northumberland	Southern terminus of PA 405
Northumberland	Sunbury	79.836	128.484	PA 61 Truck south (Chestnut Street)	Northern terminus of PA 61 Truck southbound
Northumberland	Sunbury	80.475	129.512	PA 147 south – Herndon	South end of PA 147 overlap
Susquehanna River		81.026	130.399	Veterans Memorial Bridge	
Snyder	Shamokin Dam	81.801	131.646	US 11 / US 15 / PA 147 north – Selinsgrove, Harrisburg, Danville, Lewisburg	Interchange; northern terminus; north end of PA 147 overlap
1.000 mi = 1.609 km; 1.000 km = 0.621 mi: Concurrency terminus; Incomplete access

== PA 61 Truck ==
=== Reading ===
Pennsylvania Route 61 Truck
- Location: Reading
- Existed: 2013–2017

Pennsylvania Route 61 Truck (PA 61 Truck) was a truck route of PA 61 bypassing a weight-restricted bridge over Laurel Run in Muhlenberg Township, on which trucks over 34 tons and combination loads over 40 tons were prohibited. The route followed PA 12, PA 183, and US 222. PA 61 Truck was signed in 2013. In recent years, PennDOT has determined that the bridge carrying PA 61 is in "fair condition", and the bridge is currently open with no restriction. PA 61 Truck signs were also removed from major highways that it follows in 2017, thus deleting the route.

=== Sunbury ===
Pennsylvania Route 61 Truck
- Location: Sunbury
- Existed: 1970–present

Pennsylvania Route 61 Truck (PA 61 Truck) is a truck route of PA 61 in Sunbury that helps larger vehicles avoid a narrow town square area and a tight intersection with PA 405. The northbound truck route splits from PA 61 in the downtown area by heading north on two-lane undivided North 5th Street for two blocks. Northbound PA 61 Truck turns west-northwest onto one-way Arch Street, passing a mix of homes and businesses and crossing Norfolk Southern's Buffalo Line at-grade. The northbound truck route ends at PA 405 on the east bank of the Susquehanna River, which heads south to provide access to PA 61. The southbound truck route begins at PA 61 on the east bank of the Susquehanna River, heading east-southeast on one-way Chestnut Street. Southbound PA 61 Truck runs past residences and businesses, crossing Norfolk Southern's Buffalo Line at-grade. The truck route continues southeast onto Wolverton Street, passing between homes to the north and industry to the south and curving east. The road runs to the north of the Shamokin Valley Railroad and bends northeast past more homes and commercial establishments. Southbound PA 61 Truck ends at an intersection with PA 61 in the eastern part of Sunbury.
