= Byrnesville, Pennsylvania =

Former town in Pennsylvania, US

Coordinates: 40.7959°N 76.3392°W

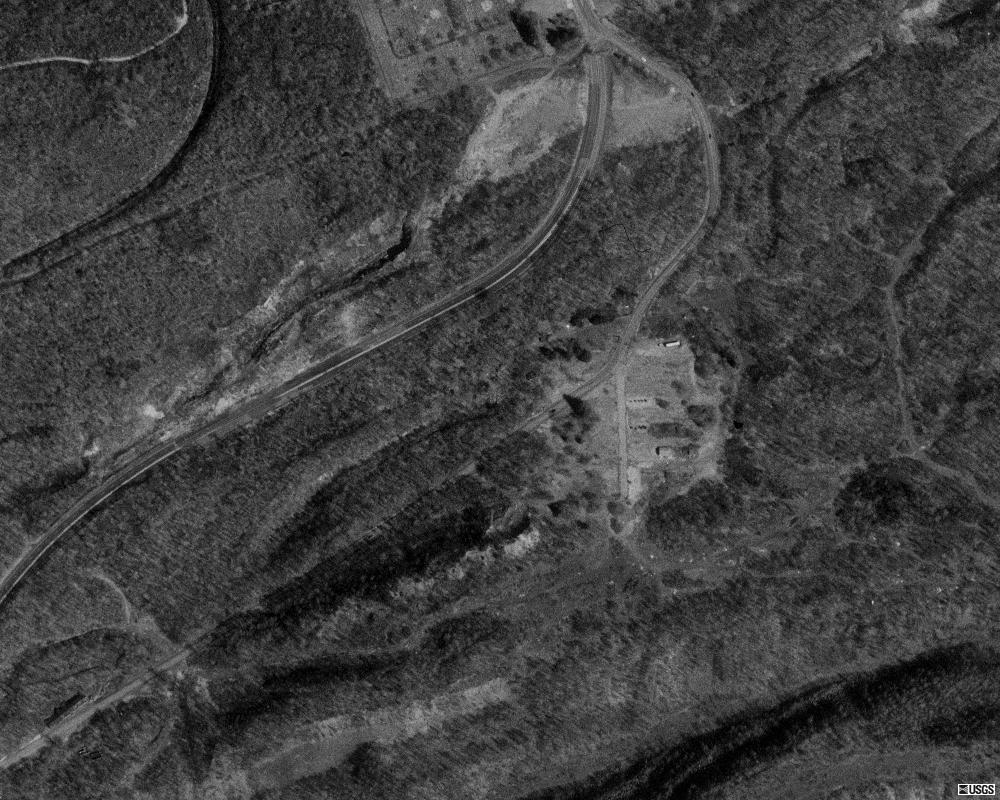
1999 satellite image showing the clearing that was once Byrnesville.

Byrnesville was a town located in Conyngham Township, Columbia County, Pennsylvania, United States. It was located about halfway between Centralia and Ashland. In 1985, the population of Byrnesville was approximately 75 people living in 29 homes.

Byrnesville was founded in 1856. Most of the residents were Irish Catholics who worked in the local anthracite coal mines. It was made up of Upper and Lower Byrnesville. The first homes were built in Lower Byrnesville around 1856 and in Upper Byrnesville around 1865. An elementary school was located in Byrnesville but was discontinued in the 1930s.

Byrnesville was one of the casualties of the Centralia mine fire. In late 1983, the 98th United States Congress approved $42 million to help move families impacted by the fire. Relocation offers were extended to residents in Byrnesville and Centralia. The last home in Byrnesville was torn down in 1996, which spelled the end for the town. The only remaining structures there as of July 2019 are a religious Shrine to the Blessed Virgin Mary on a hillside by the side of Route 61, an intermodal container, and the structural remains of a garage now reclaimed by nature.

The present-day routing of Pennsylvania Route 61 follows the two-lane Byrnesville Road — originally an old logging road through Byrnesville — bypassing a 0.75-mile (1.21 km) long section of the original route of the four-lane highway which has been heavily damaged by subsidence caused by the underground fire.

== See also ==
- Coal-seam fire
- Ghost town
- List of ghost towns in Pennsylvania
