= Centre Turnpike =

- Reading–Sunbury Road

Route information
- Maintained by Centre Turnpike Road Authority
- Length: 75 mi (121 km)
- Existed: 1808–1885

Major junctions
- South end: Penn Street in Reading
- Danville Turnpike
- North end: Market Street in Sunbury

Location
- Country: United States
- State: Pennsylvania
- Counties: Berks, Schuylkill, Columbia, Northumberland

Highway system
- Pennsylvania State Route System; Interstate; US; State; Scenic; Legislative

Centre Turnpike, also known as the Reading-Sunbury Road, was an early United States turnpike located in Pennsylvania. It followed mostly the path of the King's Highway, which had been surveyed in 1770 by Francis Yarnall. Running from Reading to Sunbury, it was 75 miles (121 km) long, was started in 1808, and was completed around 1814 at a cost of US$208,000. The final toll was collected near Bear Gap in Ralpho Township in 1885. The general path of the original turnpike is now covered partly by Pennsylvania Route 61 and Pennsylvania Route 54. It was maintained and controlled by the Centre Turnpike Road Company, which was formed on March 25, 1805.

== Route description ==
The Centre Turnpike started on Penn Street near Fourth Street in Reading. It roughly followed the path of the Schuylkill River to the community of Molino in Schuylkill County, where it diverged to the northwest toward Pottsville, a distance of 35 miles (56 km) from the origin. From Pottsville it went to the foot of Broad Mountain where toll gate #6 was located. It then headed northwest to the top of Broad Mountain, and turned west along the north side of the mountain toward the village of Fountain Springs.

The turnpike then entered Ashland 48 miles (77 km) from Reading, a half-mile west of which was located toll gate #7, just past the community of Germantown. It then continued across Locust Mountain (via the current Ashland Road, a.k.a. Snake Road and Logging Road 19018) and entered Mount Carmel. It continued in a northwest course over Red Ridge (current route of PA-54) and up the south side of Big Mountain to Natalie at the top.

From here, Centre Turnpike went down the north side of Big Mountain to Bear Gap. Bear Gap was 58 miles (93 km) from Reading, and also the site of the first toll house in Northumberland county. From Bear Gap, the road ran west (currently Reading Turnpike Road) and crossed Shamokin Creek just east of Paxinos. About one-half mile west of Bear Gap is the point where the Danville Turnpike (the current PA-54 continuing northward), incorporated in 1815, joined the Centre Turnpike.

From Paxinos, the turnpike followed the present Pennsylvania Route 61 until it crossed Shamokin Creek, just east of Sunbury. From there it followed Highland Avenue, and joined Market Street. It followed Market Street to the square, where the turnpike reached its northern terminus.

=== Tolls ===
The turnpike collected an average of $6572.67 in tolls per year in the first eleven years of operation. In 1822, the rate of tolls (per mile) were:

- Wagons with narrow wheels and four horses, 3 1/5 cents;
- Wagons with wide wheels 4–4 1/2 inches (10–11 cm), 1 3/5 cents;
- Wagons with wide wheels greater than 4 1/2 inches (11 cm), free;
- Pleasure carriages, with two horses, 2 3/5 cents;
- Horse and rider, 3/5 cents.

== History ==
The Centre Turnpike followed mostly the path of the King's Highway, which had been surveyed in 1770 by Francis Yarnall. The turnpike was started in 1808 and completed around 1814 at a cost of US$208,000. The final toll was collected near Bear Gap in Ralpho Township in 1885. It was maintained and controlled by the Centre Turnpike Road Company, which was formed on March 25, 1805. A purchaser appeared in 1884, being the Pennsylvania Railroad Company, who desired to extend their Schuylkill Division from Reading to Pottsville and New Boston. In building this section between Reading and Pottsville they encountered great difficulty on account of the Centre Turnpike being in the way of construction. The railroad company succeeded in purchasing the stock of the turnpike company and thus completed their railroad to Pottsville. On June 1, 1885 after a long period of 80 years, the franchise of the Centre Turnpike Company, passed over to the Pennsylvania Railroad Company, as is shown by the proceedings of the annual meeting of that date. During 1885-1886 the Pennsylvania Railroad Company having no further use of the turnpike, conveyed to each township the portion that passed through it. So then the toll gates were taken down and the road became free to all.
