= Schuylkill Gap =

- Interactive map of Schuylkill Gap
- Elevation: 446 feet (136 m)
- Traversed by: PA 61, Reading Blue Mountain and Northern Railroad

Third Approach
- Range: Blue Mountain
- Coordinates: 40°34′36″N 76°01′23″W

Schuylkill Gap is a water gap through Blue Mountain located about 3 miles north of Hamburg, Pennsylvania. The borough of Port Clinton, Pennsylvania resides within the gap itself.

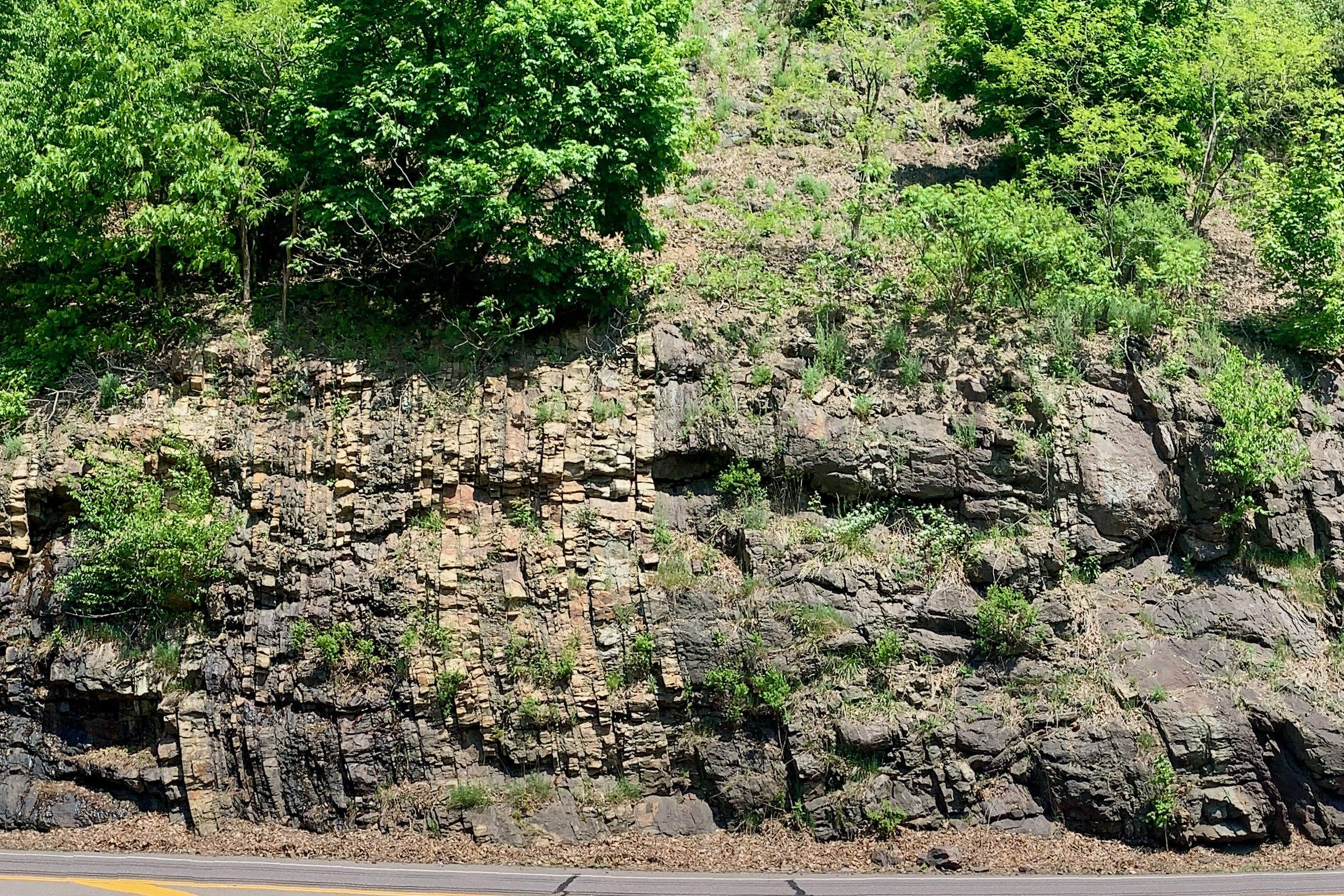
Rocks of the Clinton Group on the east face of Schuylkill Gap

Formed in much the same way as Pennsylvania's other water gaps, Schuylkill Gap is near Hawk Mountain, Weiser State Forest, and some State Game Lands. PA Route 61 as well as the Schuylkill River pass through the gap.

== See also ==
- Geology of Pennsylvania
