= Tuckerton, Pennsylvania =

Unincorporated community in Pennsylvania, US

- Unincorporated community
- Location within Pennsylvania Location within the United States
- Coordinates: 40°24′17″N 75°56′13″W
- Country: United States
- State: Pennsylvania
- County: Berks
- Township: Muhlenberg
- Elevation: 318 ft (97 m)
- Time zone: UTC-5 (Eastern (EST))
  - Summer (DST): UTC-4 (EDT)
- ZIP code: 19605
- Area codes: 610 and 484
- GNIS feature ID: 1204834

Tuckerton is an unincorporated community in Muhlenberg Township in Berks County, Pennsylvania, United States. Tuckerton is located at the intersection of Pennsylvania Route 61 and Tuckerton Road south of an interchange with U.S. Route 222.
