= Coal Run, Northumberland County, Pennsylvania =

Unincorporated community in Pennsylvania, US

Coal Run, Pennsylvania
- Unincorporated community
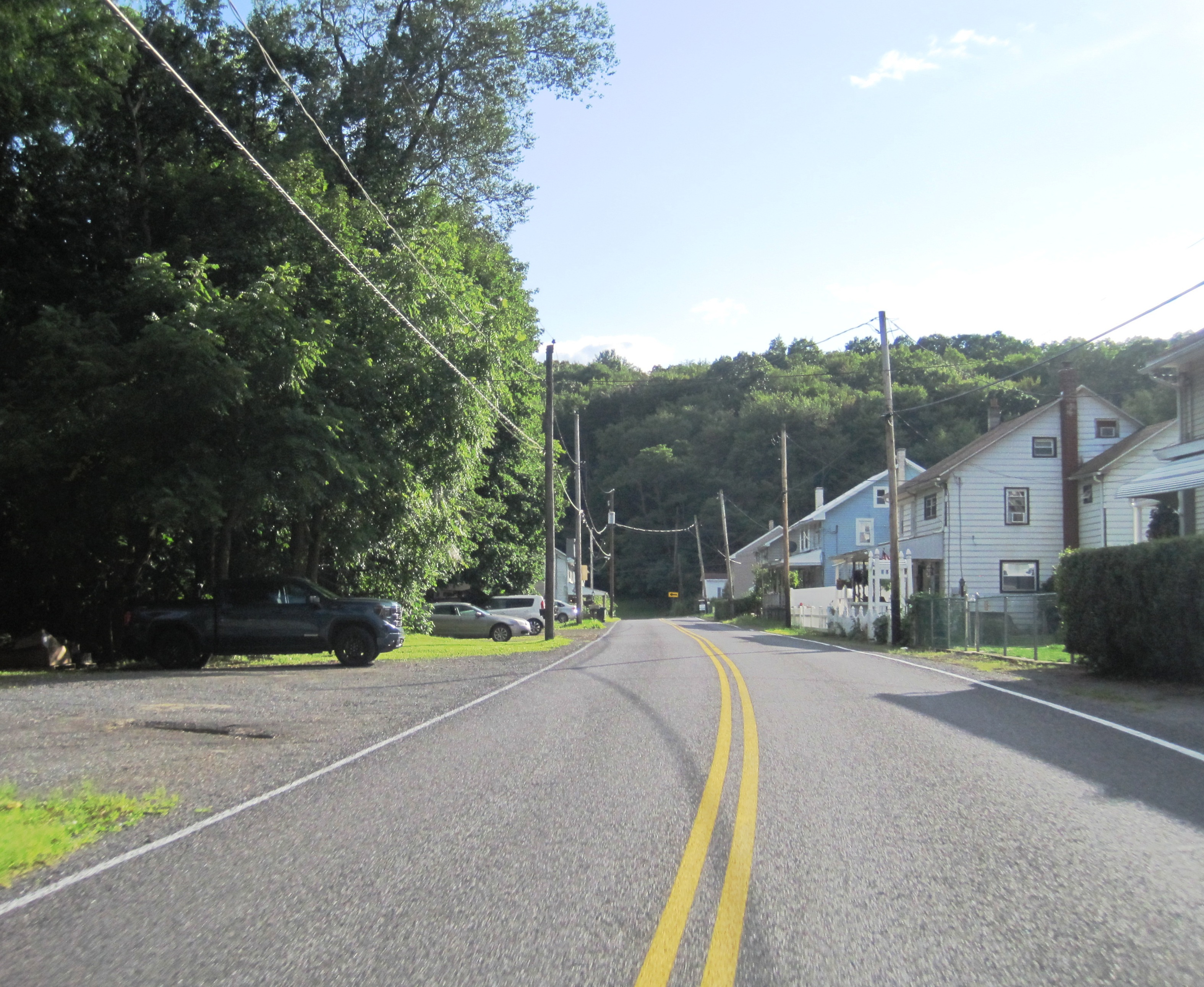
- Westbound Hickory Road in Coal Run

- Location within Pennsylvania
- Coordinates: 40°47′38″N 76°31′21″W
- Country: United States
- State: Pennsylvania
- County: Northumberland
- Township: Coal
- Elevation: 919 ft (280 m)
- Time zone: UTC-5 (Eastern (EST))
  - Summer (DST): UTC-4 (EDT)
- ZIP code: 17866
- Area codes: 570 and 272
- GNIS feature ID: 1172063

Coal Run is an unincorporated community in Coal Township in Northumberland County, Pennsylvania, United States. Coal Run is located at the intersection of Hickory Road and Fidler Green Road east of Shamokin.
