= North Manheim Township, Pennsylvania =

Township in Pennsylvania, US

Coordinates: 40°40′00″N 76°07′59″W

- Township
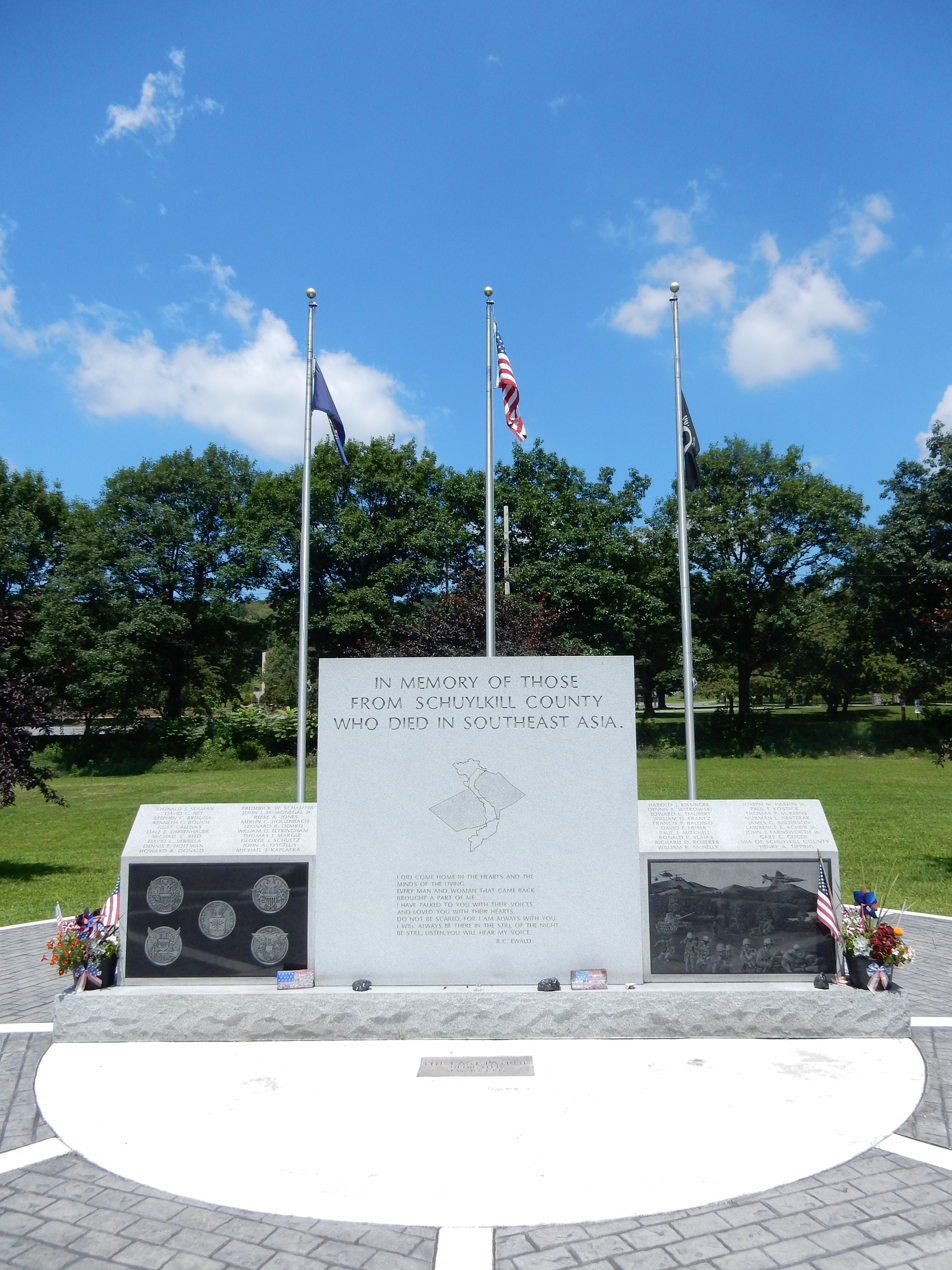
- Schuylkill County War Memorial in North Manheim Township

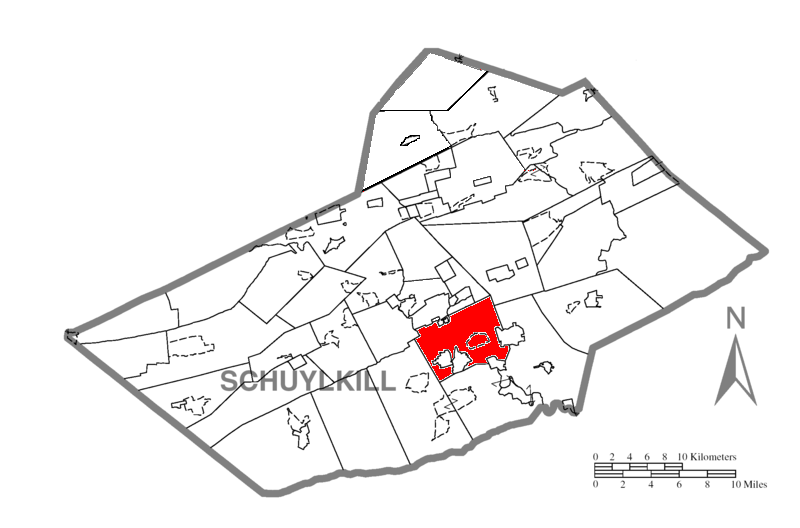
- Location of North Manheim Township in Schuylkill County, Pennsylvania

- Location of Schuylkill County, Pennsylvania in Pennsylvania
- Country: United States
- State: Pennsylvania
- County: Schuylkill
- Settled: 1770
- Incorporated: 1845

Area
  - Total: 20.42 sq mi (52.88 km^{2})
  - Land: 20.33 sq mi (52.65 km^{2})
  - Water: 0.089 sq mi (0.23 km^{2})

Population (2020)
  - Total: 4,069 ▲
  - Estimate (2023): 4,181
  - Density: 182.0/sq mi (70.26/km^{2})
- Time zone: UTC-5 (Eastern (EST))
  - Summer (DST): UTC-4 (EDT)
- FIPS code: 42-107-55192
- Website: https://www.northmanheimtwp.org/

North Manheim Township is a township that is located in Schuylkill County, Pennsylvania, United States. The population was 4,069 at the time of the 2020 census.

== History ==
This township was created in 1845 by dividing Manheim Township into South Manheim and North Manheim Townships. North Manheim was the location of the first canal tunnel in America. It was built for the Schuylkill Navigation Company.

== Geography ==
According to the U.S. Census Bureau, the township has a total area of 20.6 square miles (53.3 km^{2}), of which 20.5 square miles (53.0 km^{2}) is land and 0.1 square mile (0.2 km^{2}) (0.44%) is water. It contains the census-designated place of Renningers.

== Demographics ==
Historical population
Census	Pop.	Note	%±
2010	3,770		—
2020	4,069		7.9%
2023 (est.)	4,181		2.8%
U.S. Decennial Census

At the time of the 2000 census there were 3,287 people, 1,255 households, and 901 families living in this township.

The population density was 160.6 inhabitants per square mile (62.0/km^{2}). There were 1,339 housing units at an average density of 65.4 per square mile (25.3/km^{2}).

The racial makeup of the township was 98.24% White, 0.55% African American, 0.18% Native American, 0.55% Asian, 0.09% from other races, and 0.40% from two or more races. Hispanic or Latino of any race were 0.49%.

Of the 1,255 households that were counted during the census, 31.2% had children who were under the age of eighteen living with them; 60.9% were married couples living together, 6.6% had a female householder with no husband present, and 28.2% were non-families. 23.3% of households were one-person households and 10.8% were one-person households with residents who were aged sixty-five or older.

The average household size was 2.49 and the average family size was 2.94.

The age distribution was 22.1% of residents who were under the age of eighteen, 6.6% who were aged eighteen to twenty-four, 27.9% who were aged twenty-five to forty-four, 25.0% who were aged forty-five to sixty-four, and 18.4% who were aged sixty-five or older. The median age was forty-one years.

For every one hundred females, there were 98.4 males. For every one hundred females were aged eighteen or older, there were 98.1 males.

The median household income was $40,464 and the median family income was $51,250. Males had a median income of $37,827 compared with that of $19,875 for females.

The per capita income for the township was $19,683.

Approximately 3.9% of families and 7.1% of the population were living below the poverty line, including 4.9% of those who were under the age of eighteen and 6.8% of those who were aged sixty-five or older.

== Gallery ==
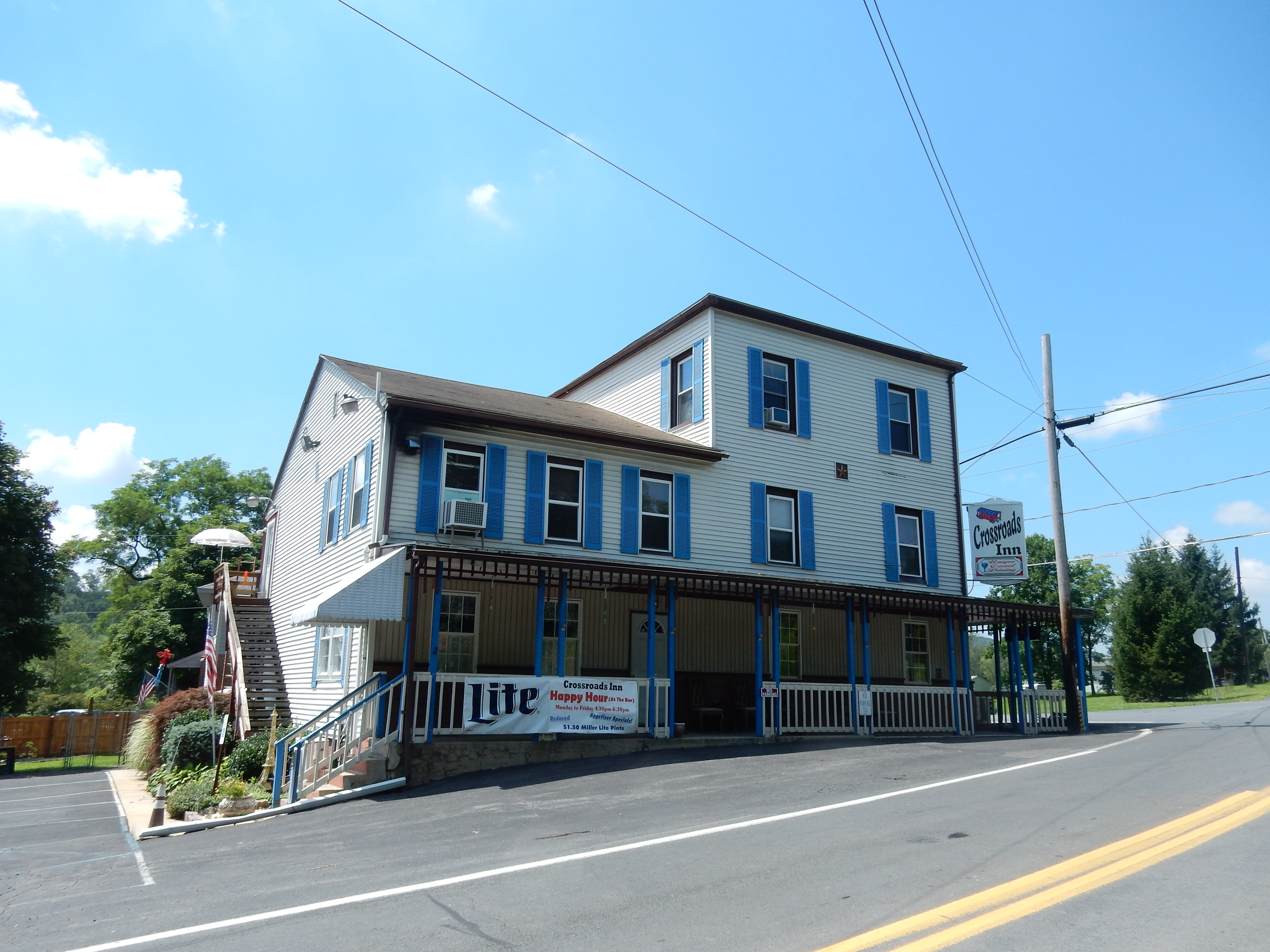
Crossroad Inn in Adamsdale

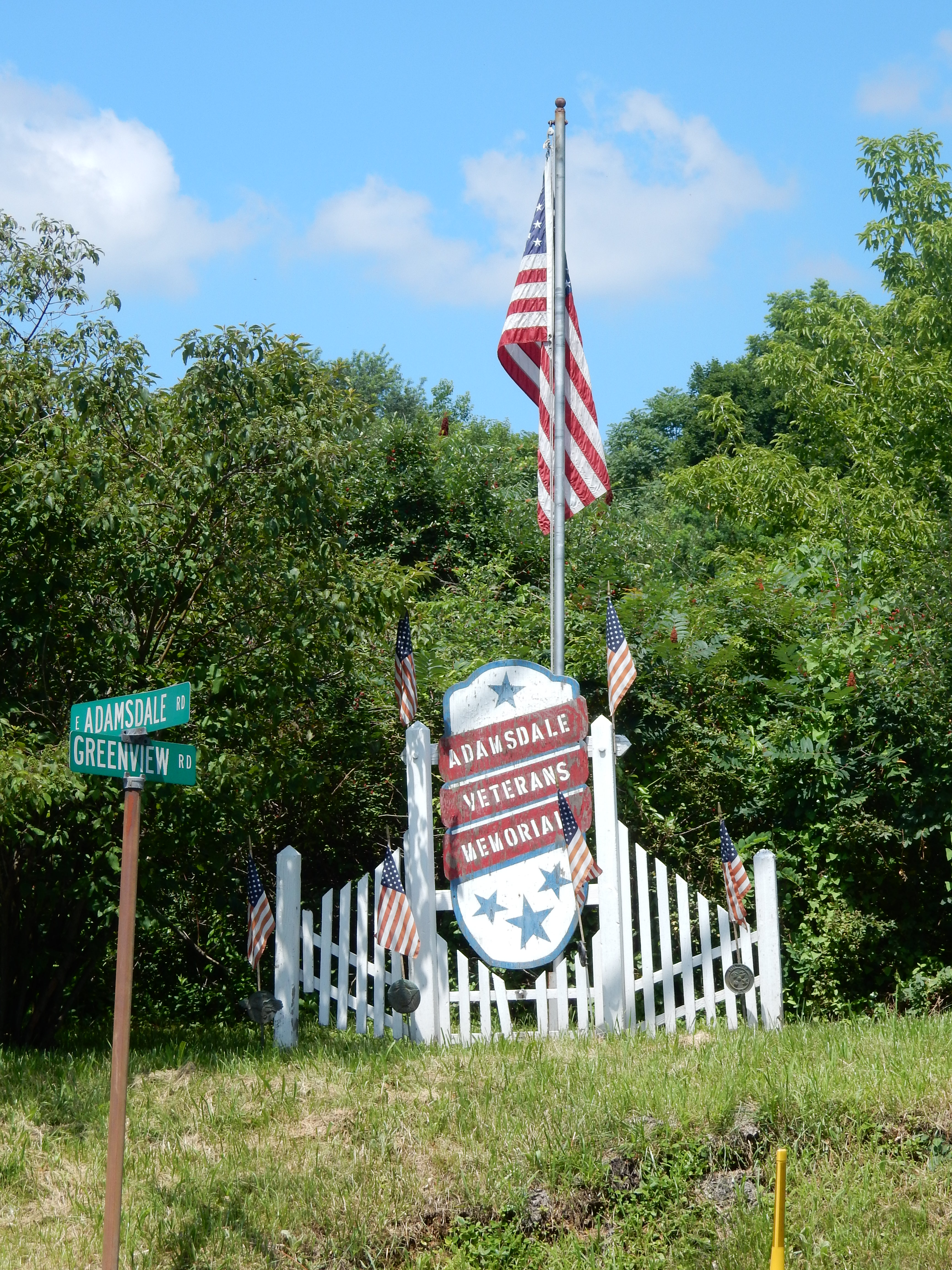
War Memorial in Adamsdale

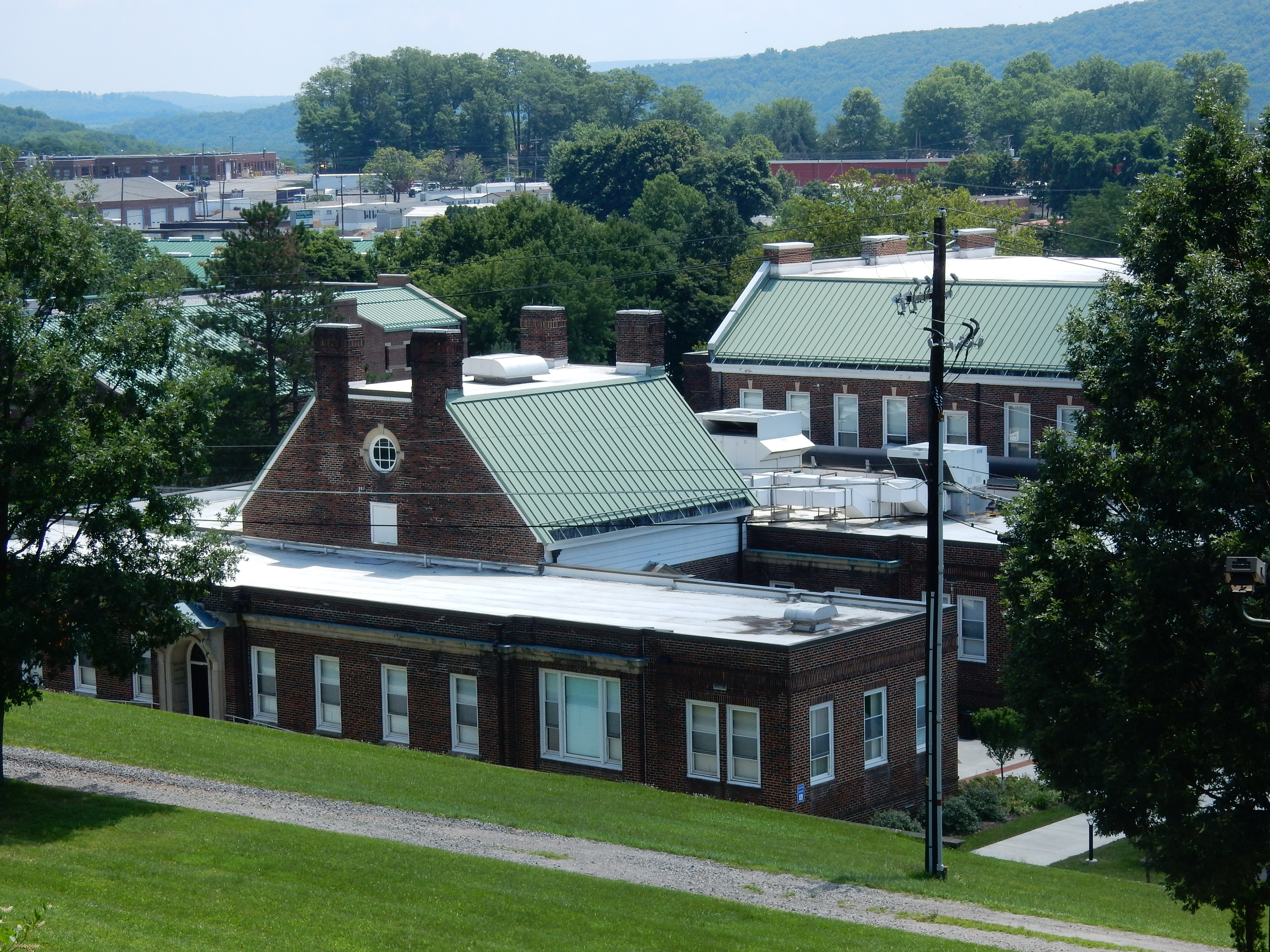
Classroom building, Penn State Schuylkill

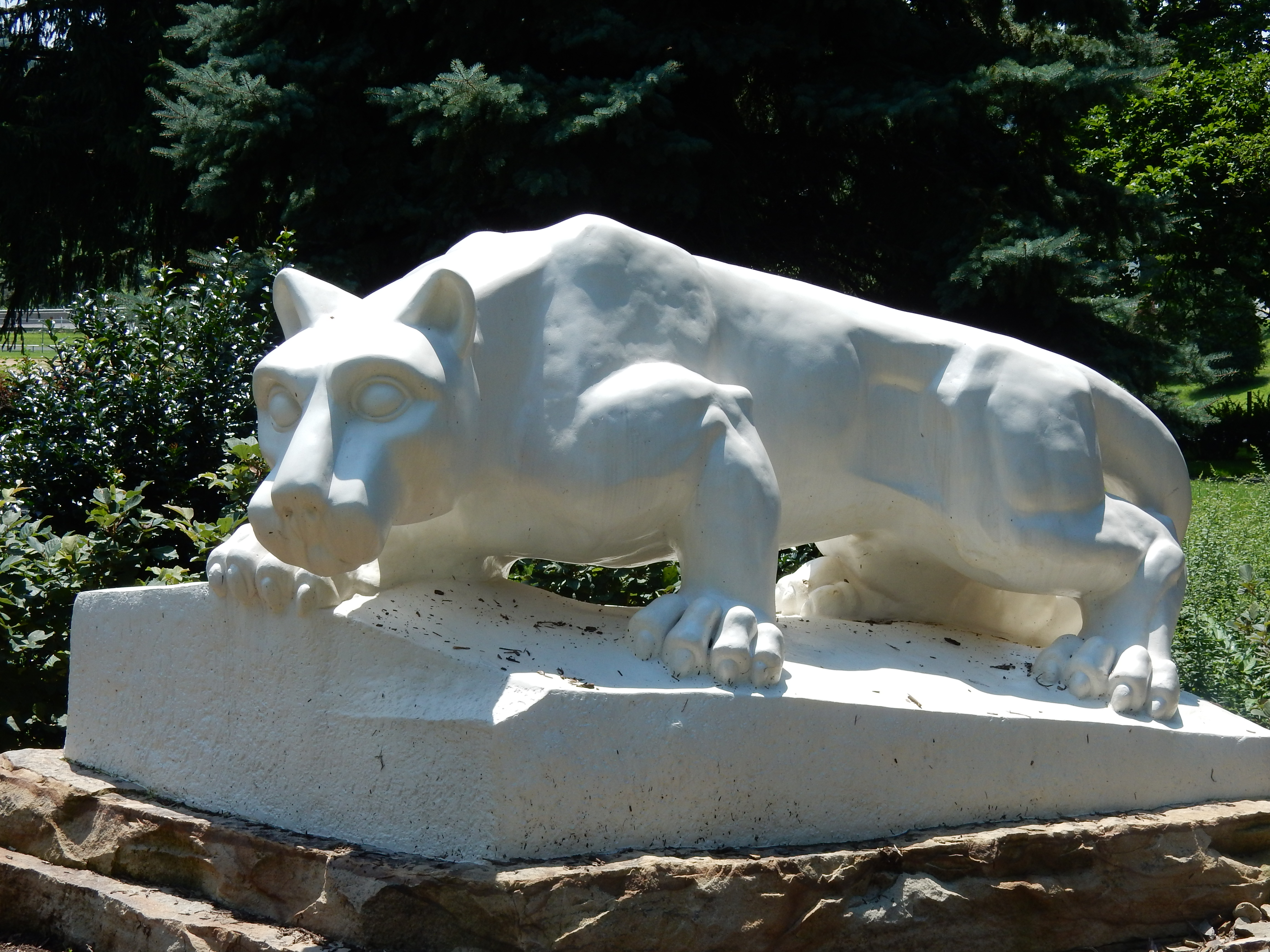
Penn State Schuylkill
