= Paxinos, Pennsylvania =

Unincorporated community in Pennsylvania, US

Paxinos
- Census-designated place
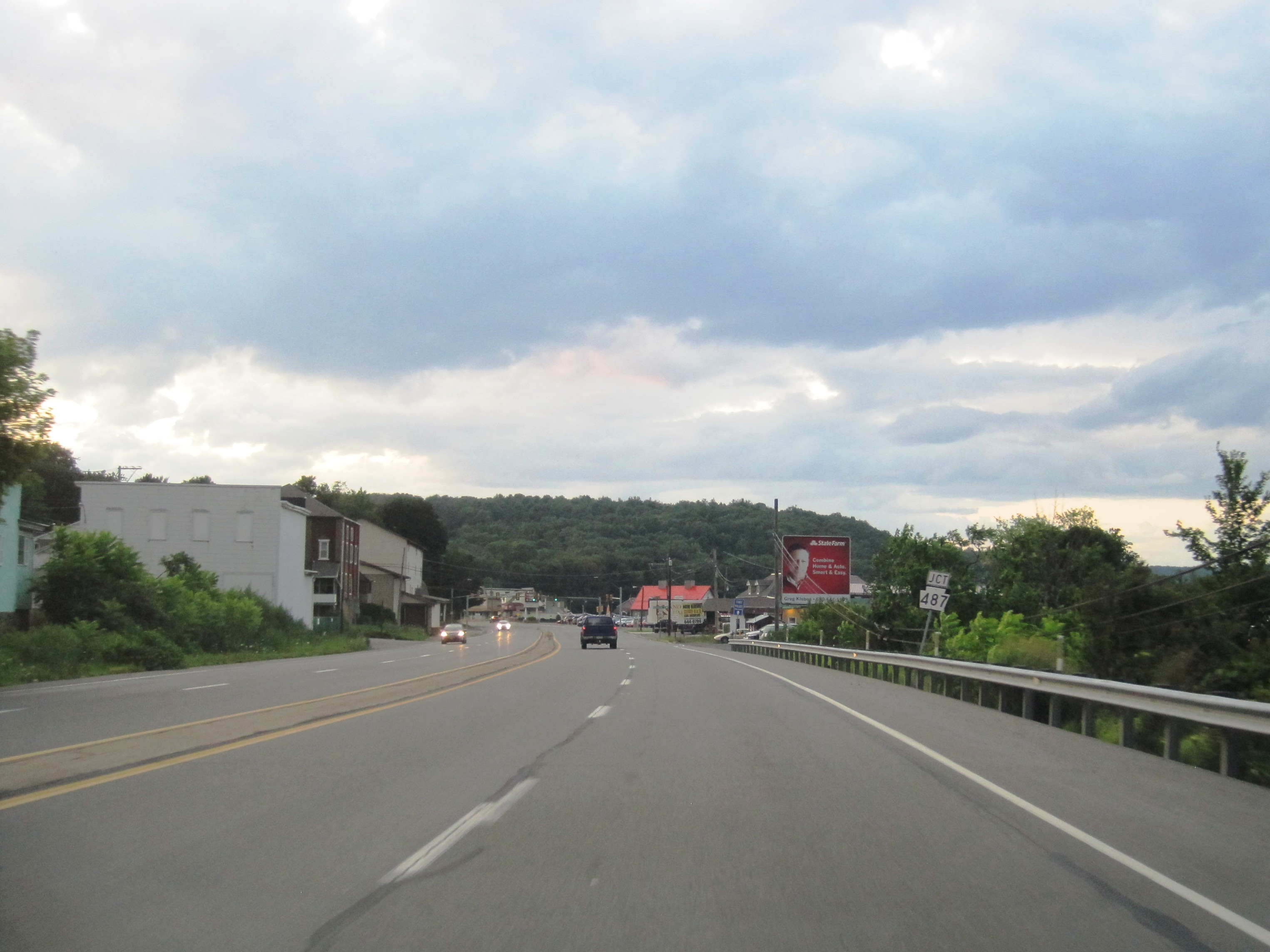
- Paxinos along northbound PA 61

- Location within the state of Pennsylvania Paxinos (the United States)
- Coordinates: 40.850826°N 76.580739°W
- Country: United States
- State: Pennsylvania
- County: Northumberland

Population (2010)
  - Total: 2,467
- Time zone: UTC-5 (Eastern (EST))
  - Summer (DST): UTC-4 (EDT)
- ZIP code: 17860
- Area code: 570

Paxinos is a census-designated place in Northumberland County, Pennsylvania, United States. It has a post office with the zip code 17860. In 2010, the population was 2,467 residents. Paxinos was founded in 1769 and was named for a Swanee Native American chief, according to its Pennsylvania Keystone Marker. The town is known in the area for its music store, which has a distinctive mural of a guitar player.
