= Bennys Run =

Bennys Run Buddys Run, Benny's Run
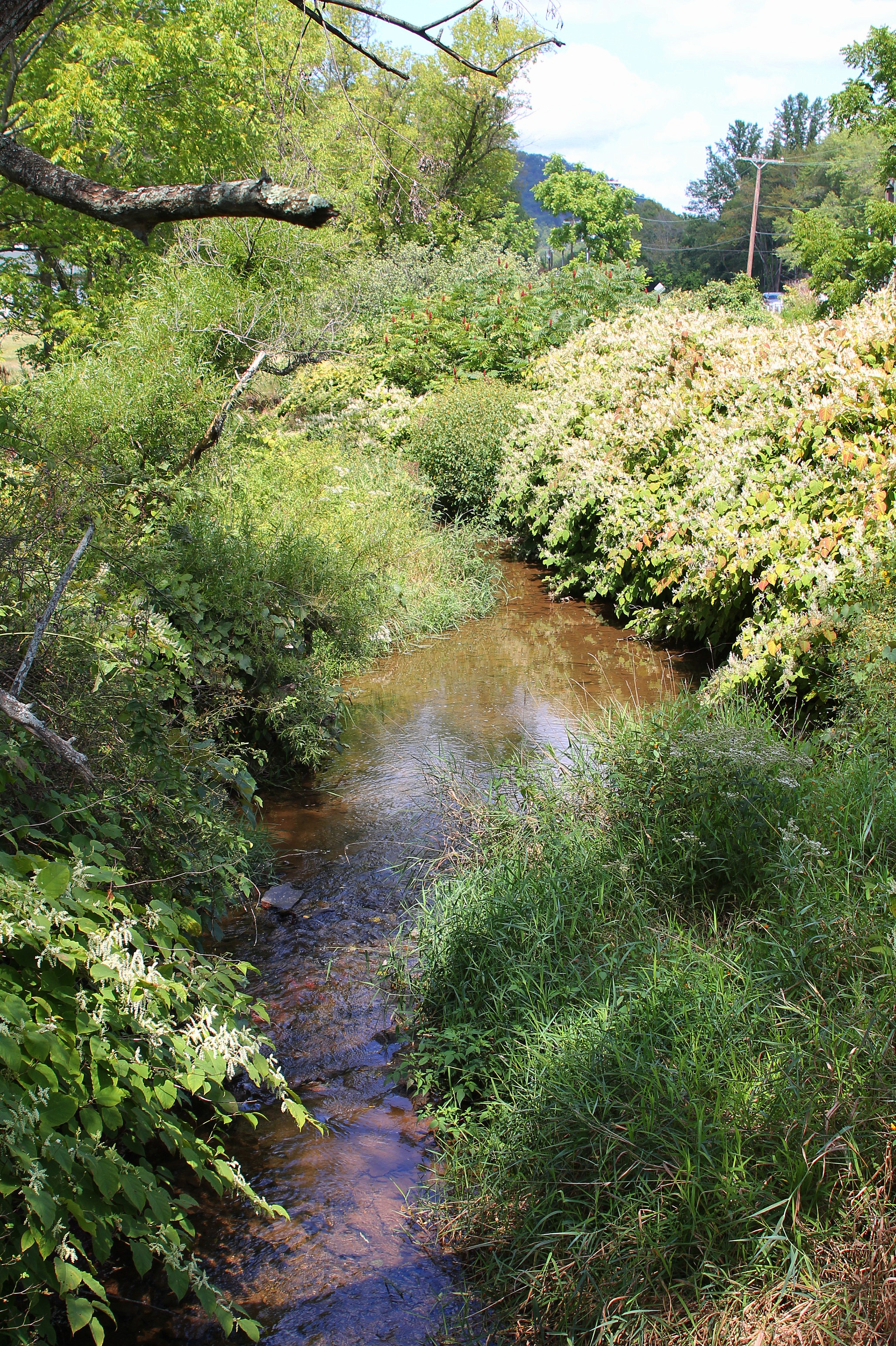
- Bennys Run looking downstream
- Etymology: a local resident named "Benny"

Physical characteristics
- Source
  - location: pond in Shamokin Township, Pennsylvania
  - elevation: between 840 and 860 feet (256 and 262 m)
- Mouth
  - location: Shamokin Creek in Shamokin Township, Pennsylvania
  - coordinates: 40°49′25″N 76°35′07″W
  - elevation: 584 ft (178 m)
- Length: 3.8 mi (6.1 km)
- Basin size: 6.12 mi^{2} (15.9 km^{2})

Basin features
- Progression: Shamokin Creek → Susquehanna River → Chesapeake Bay
- Tributaries
  - left: four unnamed tributaries
  - right: one unnamed tributary

Bennys Run (also known as Buddys Run or Benny's Run) is a tributary of Shamokin Creek in Northumberland County, Pennsylvania, in the United States. It is approximately 3.8 miles (6.1 km) long and flows through Shamokin Township. The watershed of the stream has an area of 6.12 square miles (15.9 km^{2}). The stream is not designated as an impaired waterbody and it has a relatively high level of water quality. It is a small, shallow stream and its watershed is designated as a Coldwater Fishery and a Migratory Fishery. A few bridges have been constructed across the stream.

== Course ==
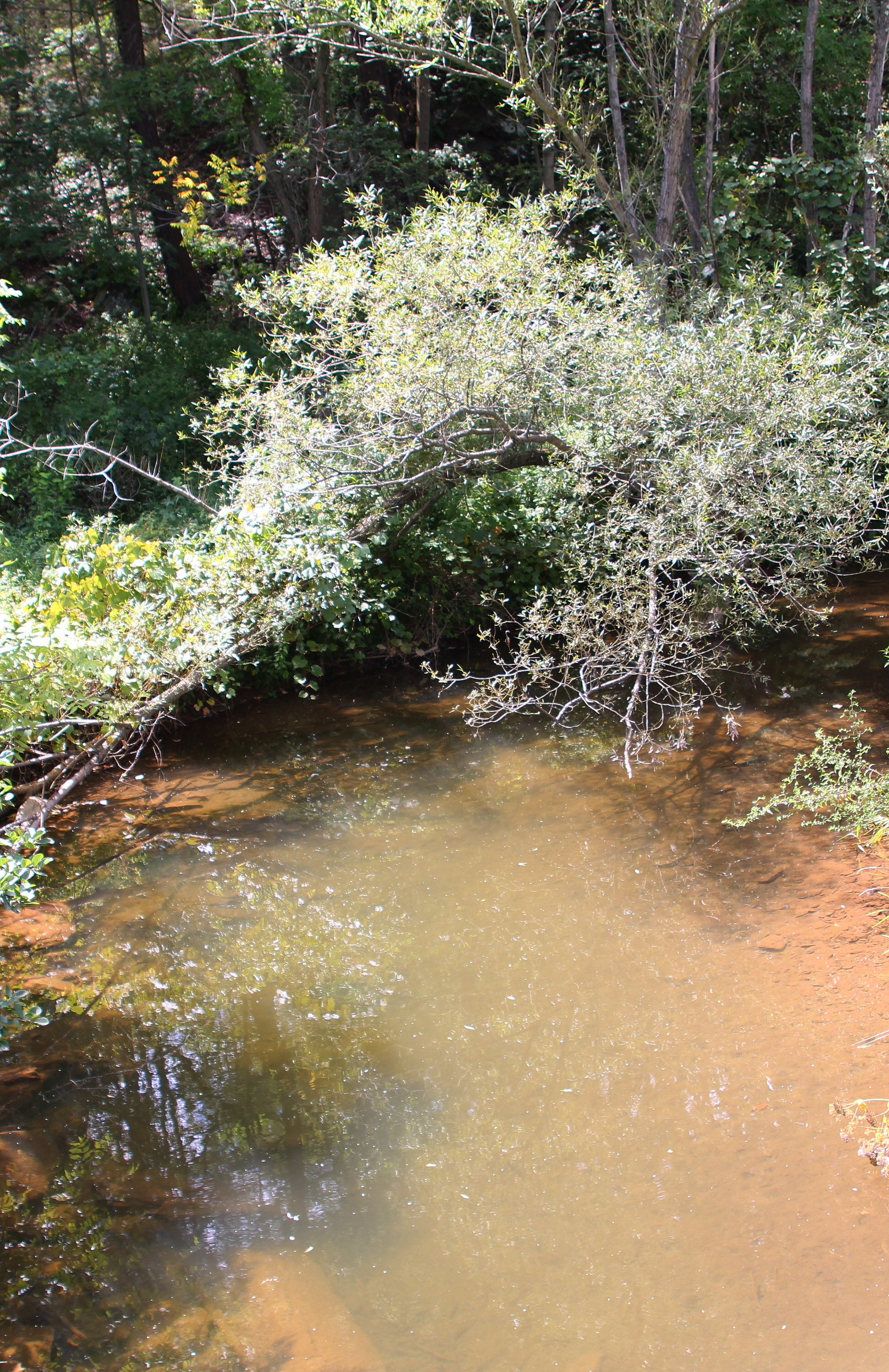
Bennys Run looking upstream

Bennys Run begins in a pond in Shamokin Township. It flows northeast for a few tenths of a mile before turning east-northeast and flowing through a valley. Over the next few miles, the stream receives four unnamed tributaries from the left and one unnamed tributary from the right. It then turns north-northeast for a few tenths of a mile before crossing Pennsylvania Route 61 and reaching its confluence with Shamokin Creek.

Bennys Run joins Shamokin Creek 18.20 miles (29.29 km) upstream of its mouth.

== Hydrology ==
Bennys Run is not designated as an impaired waterbody. The engineering department of the Pennsylvania Department of Transportation once received an NPDES permit to discharge stormwater into the stream for construction purposes. However, in 2005 and 2006, the Pennsylvania Department of Environmental Protection received complaints about untreated sewage discharge into the creek. The estimated flow of sewage into the stream was 12,000 US gallons (45 m^{3}) per day.

Bennys Run has a relatively high level of water quality. It is not impacted by mining.

== Geography and geology ==
The elevation near the mouth of Bennys Run is 584 feet (178 m) above sea level. The elevation of the stream's source is between 840 and 860 feet (256 and 262 m) above sea level.

Bennys Run is a small and shallow stream situated in Irish Valley. It flows in a generally easterly direction.

== Watershed ==
The watershed of Bennys Run has an area of 6.12 square miles (15.9 km^{2}). The mouth of the stream is in the United States Geological Survey quadrangle of Shamokin. However, its source is in the quadrangle of Trevorton. The watershed borders several other watersheds, including the Little Shamokin Creek watershed, the Lick Run watershed, and the lower Shamokin Creek watershed.

A road known as Irish Valley Road runs alongside Bennys Run for some distance. There are areas of rural land in the vicinity of the stream.

== History ==
Bennys Run was entered into the Geographic Names Information System on August 2, 1979. Its identifier in the Geographic Names Information System is 1169259. The stream is named after "Benny", a man who used to live along the stream. However, it is also known as Buddys Run or Benny's Run. This variant name appears on a United States Geological Survey map from 1952. However, in 1969, several locals who had lived near the stream for 50 years had never heard of the stream being called Buddys Run.

A concrete tee beam bridge carrying Pennsylvania Route 61 over Bennys Run was built in 1947. It is 48.9 feet (14.9 m) long and is situated 1 mile (1.6 km) north of Weigh Scales. In 1967, a prestressed box beam or girders bridge was built over the stream 1 mile (1.6 km) west of Weigh Scales in 1967. It is 37.1 feet (11.3 m) long and carries State Route 4026. A concrete culvert bridge carrying State Route 4026 was built across the stream in 1996. This bridge is located 3 miles (4.8 km) west of Weigh Scales and is 26.9 feet (8.2 m) long.

== Biology ==
The drainage basin of Bennys run is designated as a Coldwater Fishery and a Migratory Fishery.

== See also ==
- Millers Run, next tributary of Shamokin Creek going downstream
- Trout Run (Shamokin Creek), next tributary of Shamokin Creek going upstream
- List of rivers of Pennsylvania
- List of tributaries of Shamokin Creek
