= List of tributaries of Shamokin Creek =

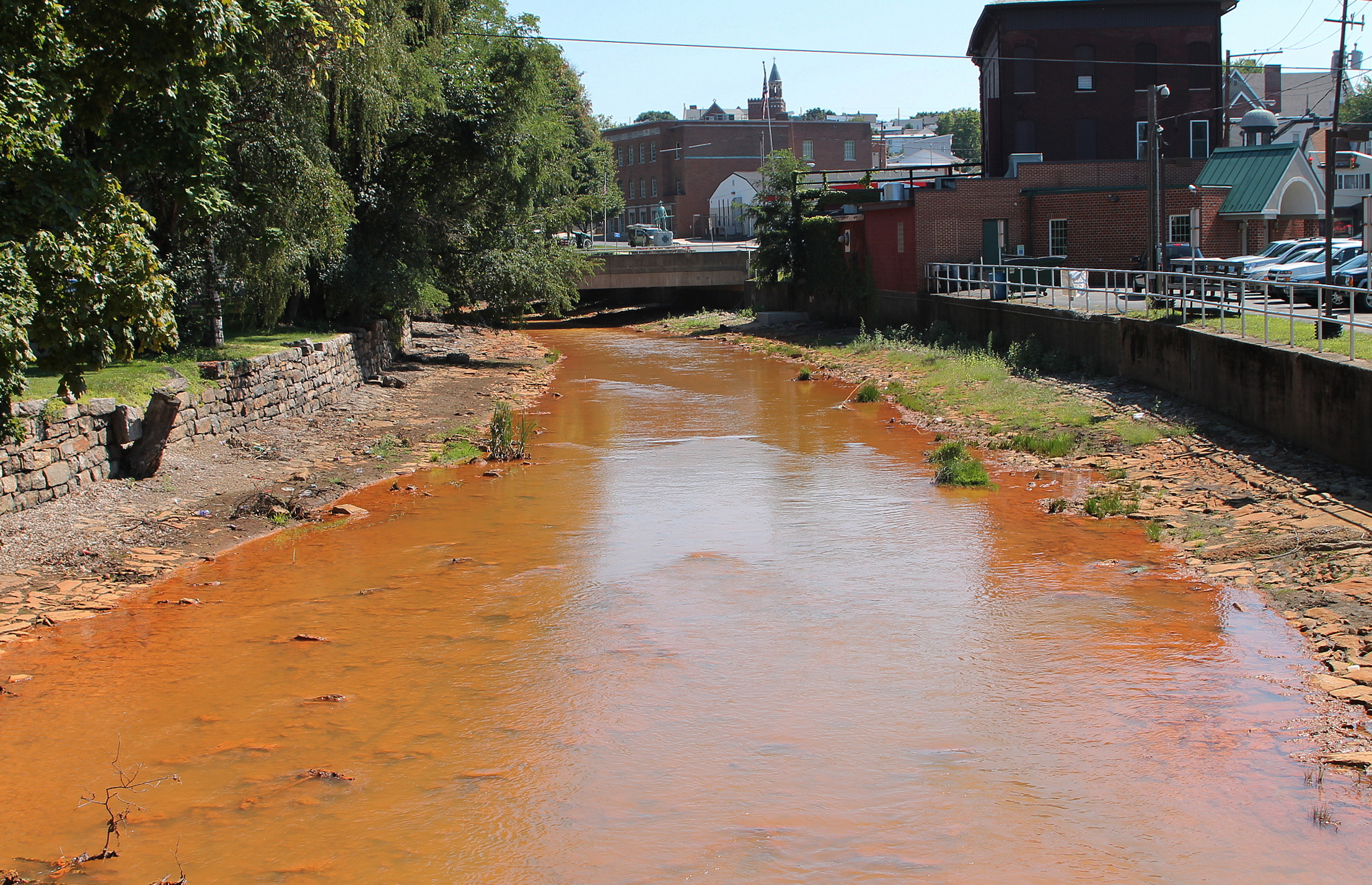
Shamokin Creek in Shamokin, Pennsylvania

Shamokin Creek is a 32.4-mile (52.1 km) long creek flowing through Northumberland County, Pennsylvania, in the United States, into the Susquehanna River. It has 12 named tributaries, including 11 direct tributaries and one sub-tributary. The tributaries include seven runs and five creeks. The longest are Little Shamokin Creek, Carbon Run, North Branch Shamokin Creek, Coal Run, and Millers Run.

Many of the upper tributaries of Shamokin Creek are in the Western Middle Anthracite Coalfield, and nearly all of the streams in this part of the watershed are impacted by mining, except for Furnace Run. Various mine drainage sites occur in the watersheds of all other streams in the upper Shamokin Creek watershed. None of the tributaries in the lower reaches of the Shamokin Creek watershed are affected by mining. Four tributaries of Shamokin Creek—Lick Creek, Millers Run, Bennys Run, and Trout Run—are not designated as impaired waterbodies by the United States Environmental Protection Agency. Another five tributaries—North Branch Shamokin Creek, Locust Creek, Quaker Run, Coal Run, and Carbon Run— are impaired by metals due to abandoned mine drainage. Furnace Run is impaired by channelization and habitat alteration, while Little Shamokin Creek and its tributary Plum Creek are impaired by siltation, organic enrichment, and low levels of dissolved oxygen.

Although the main stem of Shamokin Creek is designated as a Warmwater Fishery, all of its tributaries are designated as Coldwater Fisheries. (Note: Coldwater Fishery and Warmwater Fishery are both official designations. The first means that a stream supports fish from the family Salmonidae and other cold-water fauna and flora and the second means that a stream supports warm-water fauna and flora.) Some tributaries, such as North Branch Shamokin Creek and Quaker Run, lack fish life. However, several fish species have been observed in Carbon Run, and downstream tributaries such as Trout Run, Bennys Run, Millers Run, and Lick Creek have supported healthy communities of aquatic life. Additionally, a small fish hatchery is maintained at the mouth of Trout Run by local sportsmen.

== Tributaries of Shamokin Creek ==
Note: Buck Creek, a former stream that is in the Geographic Names Information System, but not on The National Map, is not listed.

| Name | Length | Watershed area | Distance from mouth of Shamokin Creek | Mouth elevation | Source elevation | Mouth coordinates | Image |
|---|---|---|---|---|---|---|---|
| Little Shamokin Creek | 15.0 miles (24.1 km) | 29.0 square miles (75 km^{2}) | 2.58 miles (4.15 km) | 433 feet (132 m) | ~1,020 feet (310 m) | 40°51′38″N 76°46′33″W | |
| Lick Creek | 2.7 miles (4.3 km) | 2.46 square miles (6.4 km^{2}) | 16.03 miles (25.80 km) | 545 feet (166 m) | 960 to 980 feet (293 to 299 m) | 40°50′57″N 76°35′14″W | |
| Millers Run | 4.1 miles (6.6 km) | 5.48 square miles (14.2 km^{2}) | 16.84 miles (27.10 km) | 574 feet (175 m) | 900 to 920 feet (274 to 280 m) | 40°50′20″N 76°35′03″W | |
| Bennys Run | 3.8 miles (6.1 km) | 6.12 square miles (15.9 km^{2}) | 18.20 miles (29.29 km) | 584 feet (178 m) | 840 to 860 feet (256 to 262 m) | 40°49′24″N 76°35′07″W | |
| Trout Run | 1.4 miles (2.3 km) | 3.01 square miles (7.8 km^{2}) | 20.48 miles (32.96 km) | 656 feet (200 m) | 880 to 900 feet (268 to 274 m) | 40°48′15″N 76°34′08″W | |
| Furnace Run | 1.0 mile (1.6 km) | 1.61 square miles (4.2 km^{2}) | 21.54 miles (34.67 km) | 745 feet (227 m) | 840 to 860 feet (256 to 262 m) | 40°47′18″N 76°34′02″W | |
| Carbon Run | 5.2 miles (8.4 km) | 8.78 square miles (22.7 km^{2}) | 21.62 miles (34.79 km) | 709 feet (216 m) | 1,060 to 1,080 feet (323 to 329 m) | 40°47′20″N 76°33′47″W | |
| Coal Run | 4.7 miles (7.6 km) | 6.25 square miles (16.2 km^{2}) | 22.54 miles (36.27 km) | 725 feet (221 m) | 1,220 to 1,240 feet (372 to 378 m) | 40°47′29″N 76°33′12″W | |
| Quaker Run | 3.7 miles (6.0 km) | 3.62 square miles (9.4 km^{2}) | 24.68 miles (39.72 km) | 830 feet (250 m) | 1,100 to 1,120 feet (335 to 341 m) | 40°47′02″N 76°31′23″W | |
| Locust Creek | 4.0 miles (6.4 km) | 5.75 square miles (14.9 km^{2}) | 28.88 miles (46.48 km) | 1,010 feet (310 m) | 1,340 to 1,360 feet (408 to 415 m) | 40°46′54″N 76°27′22″W | |
| North Branch Shamokin Creek | 4.8 miles (7.7 km) | 5.73 square miles (14.8 km^{2}) | 29.96 miles (48.22 km) | 1,027 feet (313 m) | 1,480 to 1,500 feet (451 to 457 m) | 40°47′29″N 76°26′29″W | |

=== Tributaries of Little Shamokin Creek ===
| Name | Length | Watershed area | Distance from confluence with Shamokin Creek | Mouth elevation | Source elevation | Mouth coordinates | Image |
|---|---|---|---|---|---|---|---|
| Plum Creek | 4.7 miles (7.6 km) | 10.2 square miles (26 km^{2}) | 1.52 miles (2.45 km) | 495 feet (151 m) | 680 to 700 feet (207 to 213 m) | 40°51′04″N 76°45′16″W | |

== See also ==
- List of rivers of Pennsylvania
