= Millers Run =

River in the United States of America

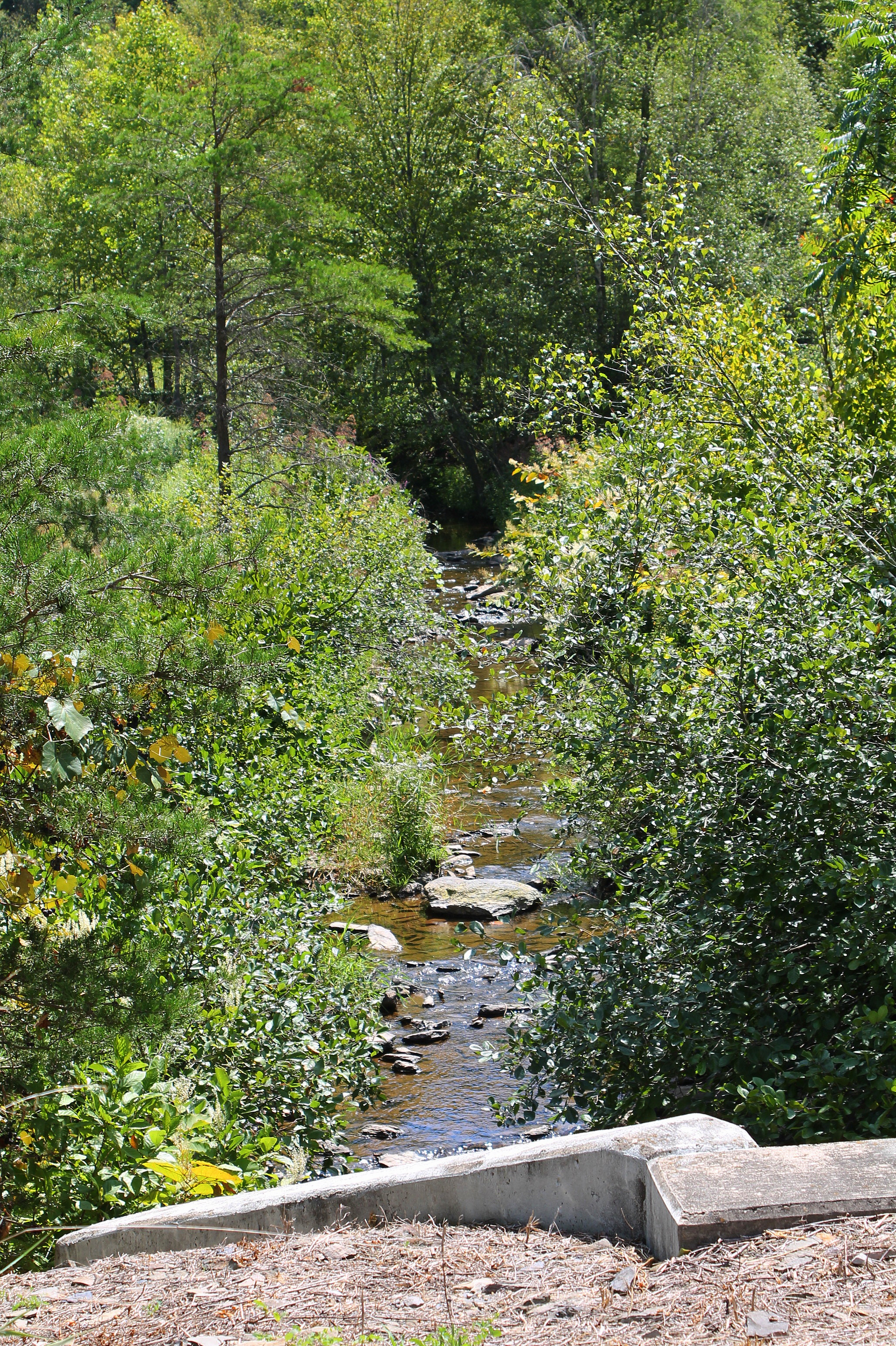
- Millers Run in its lower reaches

Physical characteristics
- Source
  - location: hill in Ralpho Township, Pennsylvania
  - elevation: between 900 and 920 feet (270 and 280 m)
- Mouth
  - location: Shamokin Creek in Ralpho Township, Pennsylvania
  - coordinates: 40°50′21″N 76°35′03″W
  - elevation: 574 ft (175 m)
- Length: 4.1 mi (6.6 km)
- Basin size: 5.48 sq mi (14.2 km^{2})

Basin features
- Progression: Shamokin Creek → Susquehanna River → Chesapeake Bay

Millers Run is a tributary of Shamokin Creek in Northumberland County, Pennsylvania, in the United States. It is approximately 4.1 miles (6.6 km) long and flows through Ralpho Township. The watershed of the stream has an area of 5.48 square miles (14.2 km^{2}). The stream is not impacted by mining and is not designated as an impaired waterbody. It is a small stream near the lower Shamokin Creek watershed. A number of bridges have been constructed over it. The watershed of Millers Run is designated as a Coldwater Fishery and a Migratory Fishery.

== Course ==
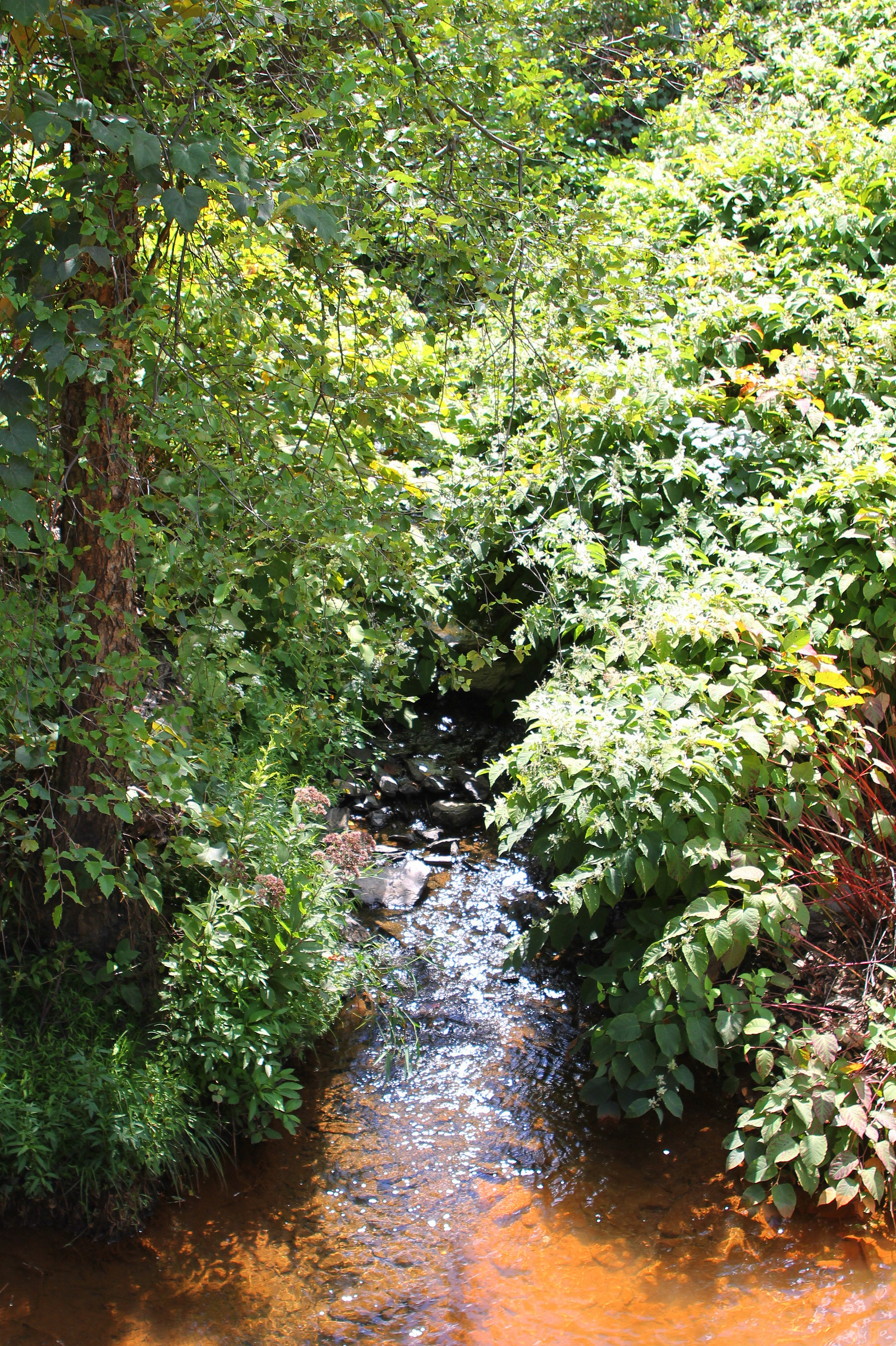
Mouth of Millers Run

Millers Run begins on a hill in Ralpho Township. It enters a valley and flows west-southwest for several tenths of a mile before turning west. After a few tenths of a mile, it turns west-southwest. Several tenths of a mile further downstream, the stream turns northwest for more than a mile before turning west and flowing alongside Gilgers Ridge. After a few tenths of a mile, it turns south and then northwest before reaching its confluence with Shamokin Creek.

Millers Run joins Shamokin Creek 16.84 miles (27.10 km) upstream of its mouth.

== Hydrology ==
Millers Run is an unimpaired waterbody, as are all other streams in its watershed. It is not impacted by mining.

In April 1975, the specific conductance of Millers Run was measured to be 71 micro-siemens per centimeter. The concentration of water hardness in the stream was 22 milligrams per liter (0.022 oz/cu ft).

In April 1975, the concentrations of sodium and potassium in the filtered water of Millers Run were 2.90 and 0.80 milligrams per liter (0.00290 and 0.00080 oz/cu ft). The magnesium and calcium concentrations in the filtered water were 2.50 and 4.50 milligrams per liter (0.00250 and 0.00449 oz/cu ft). The strontium and barium were only 30 and 40 micrograms per liter (3.0×10^{−5} and 4.0×10^{−5} oz/cu ft) and the beryllium concentration was less than 10 micrograms per liter (1.00×10^{−5} oz/cu ft).

In April 1975, the concentrations of cadmium, chromium, copper, lead, and nickel in the filtered waters of Millers Run were all less than 2 micrograms per liter (2.0×10^{−6} oz/cu ft). The titanium and vanadium concentrations were 0.6 micrograms per liter (6.0×10^{−7} oz/cu ft) and less than 1.0 microgram per liter (1.00×10^{−6} oz/cu ft), respectively. The manganese concentration ranged from less than 10 micrograms per liter (1.00×10^{−5} oz/cu ft) to 20 micrograms per liter (2.0×10^{−5} oz/cu ft), while the iron concentration was 40 micrograms per liter (4.0×10^{−5} oz/cu ft). The aluminum concentration was 25 micrograms per liter (2.5×10^{−5} oz/cu ft) and the molybdenum concentration was less than 1 microgram per liter (1.00×10^{−6} oz/cu ft). The mercury concentration was less than 0.5 micrograms per liter (5.0×10^{−7} oz/cu ft). Detectable amounts of boron, cobalt, lithium, and zinc were observed.

The bicarbonate concentration of Millers Run was measured to be 8 milligrams per liter (0.0080 oz/cu ft) in April 1975. The concentration of organic carbon in the stream was 9 milligrams per liter (0.0090 oz/cu ft). The concentrations of fluoride and chloride in the stream's filtered water were less than 0.10 milligrams per liter (0.000100 oz/cu ft) and 4.9 milligrams per liter (0.0049 oz/cu ft), while the concentrations of silica and sulfate were 6.30 and 11.0 milligrams per liter (0.00629 and 0.01099 oz/cu ft). The arsenic concentration was 1 microgram per liter (1.00×10^{−6} oz/cu ft). The concentrations of nitrate and nitrite were 7.50 and 0.030 milligrams per liter (0.007491 and 3.0×10^{−5} oz/cu ft), respectively.

== Geography, geology, and watershed ==
The elevation near the mouth of Millers Run is 574 feet (175 m) above sea level. The elevation of the stream's source is between 900 and 920 feet (270 and 280 m) above sea level.

Millers Run is a relatively small stream.

The watershed of Millers Run has an area of 5.48 square miles (14.2 km^{2}). The stream is entirely within the United States Geological Survey quadrangle of Shamokin. The watershed borders the lower Shamokin Creek watershed. It is in the southeastern part of the northern part of the creek's drainage basin.

== History ==
Millers Run was entered into the Geographic Names Information System on August 2, 1979. Its identifier in the Geographic Names Information System is 1181247.

A concrete slab bridge carrying State Route 2016 over Millers Run was built in 1918. It is 28.9 feet (8.8 m) long and is located 1 mile (1.6 km) southeast of Paxinos. In 1929, a concrete stringer/multi-beam or girder bridge carrying State Route 2018 was constructed across the stream 2 miles (3.2 km) northwest of Bear Gap. This bridge is 32.2 feet (9.8 m) long. A bridge of the same type, but carrying State Route 2016 was built over the stream in 1930. It is located 0.5 miles (0.80 km) southeast of Paxinos and is 32.2 feet (9.8 m) long. A concrete culvert bridge was built over the stream south of Paxinos in 1998. This bridge is 21.0 feet (6.4 m) long and carries Township Road 764.

A $1000 bridge rehabilitation of a bridge carrying State Route 2018 over Millers Run was authorized by the state of Pennsylvania in Act 1996-9 (SS2) in the mid-1990s.

== Biology ==
The drainage basin of Millers Run is designated as a Coldwater Fishery and a Migratory Fishery. Some aquatic life exists within the stream. It has historically contained a healthy population of aquatic life.

== See also ==
- Lick Creek (Shamokin Creek), next tributary of Shamokin Creek going downstream
- Bennys Run, next tributary of Shamokin Creek going upstream
- List of rivers of Pennsylvania
- List of tributaries of Shamokin Creek
