= North Branch Shamokin Creek =

North Branch Shamokin Creek Beaver Creek
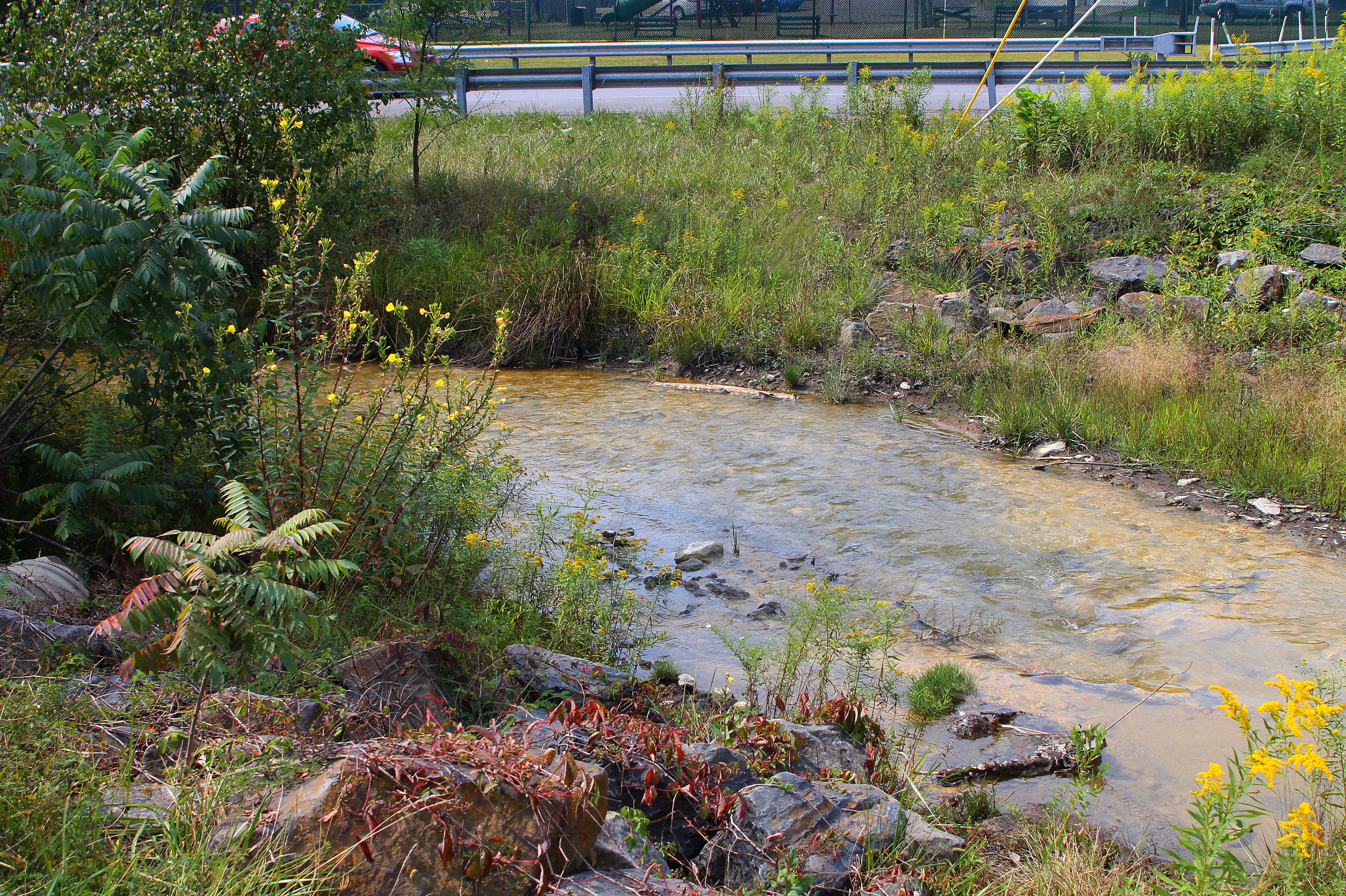
- North Branch Shamokin Creek

Physical characteristics
- Source
  - location: valley near Big Mountain, in Wilburton Number Two, in Conyngham Township, Columbia County, Pennsylvania
  - elevation: between 1,480 and 1,500 feet (450 and 460 m)
- Mouth
  - location: Shamokin Creek in Mount Carmel Township, Northumberland County, Pennsylvania
  - coordinates: 40°47′30″N 76°26′29″W
  - elevation: 1,027 ft (313 m)
- Length: 4.8 mi (7.7 km)
- Basin size: 5.73 mi^{2} (14.8 km^{2})

Basin features
- Progression: Shamokin Creek → Susquehanna River → Chesapeake Bay

North Branch Shamokin Creek (also known as Beaver Creek) is a tributary of Shamokin Creek in Columbia County and Northumberland County, Pennsylvania, United States. It is approximately 4.8 miles (7.7 km) long and flows through Conyngham Township in Columbia County and Mount Carmel Township in Northumberland County. The watershed of the creek has an area of 5.73 square miles (14.8 km^{2}). The entirety of the creek is designated as an impaired waterbody due to metals from abandoned mine drainage. It is acidic, but its pH has been increasing. Underground mine complexes occur within the watershed. The creek has a permeable streambed and experiences flow loss.

A colliery historically discharged waste water into North Branch Shamokin Creek. A number of bridges have been constructed over the creek. Its drainage basin is designated as a Coldwater Fishery and a Migratory Fishery. However, the creek is incapable of supporting aquatic life, including fish and macroinvertebrates.

== Course ==
North Branch Shamokin Creek begins in a valley near Big Mountain, in the census-designated place of Wilburton Number Two, in Conyngham Township, Columbia County. The creek flows west-southwest through the valley for more than a mile before exiting Congnyham Township and Columbia County.

Upon exiting Columbia County, North Branch Shamokin Creek enters Mount Carmel Township, Northumberland County. It continues flowing west-southwest for more than a mile before passing through two lakes and turning south-southwest. After several tenths of a mile, the creek passes near the census-designated places of Strong and Atlas. The creek turns southeast and crosses Pennsylvania Route 61. For the next few tenths of a mile, it flows alongside Pennsylvania Route 54 and Green Ridge. It then crosses Pennsylvania Route 54 and gradually turns west-southwest. Several tenths of a mile further downstream, the creek reaches its confluence with Shamokin Creek.

North Branch Shamokin Creek joins Shamokin Creek 29.96 miles (48.22 km) upstream of its mouth.

== Hydrology ==
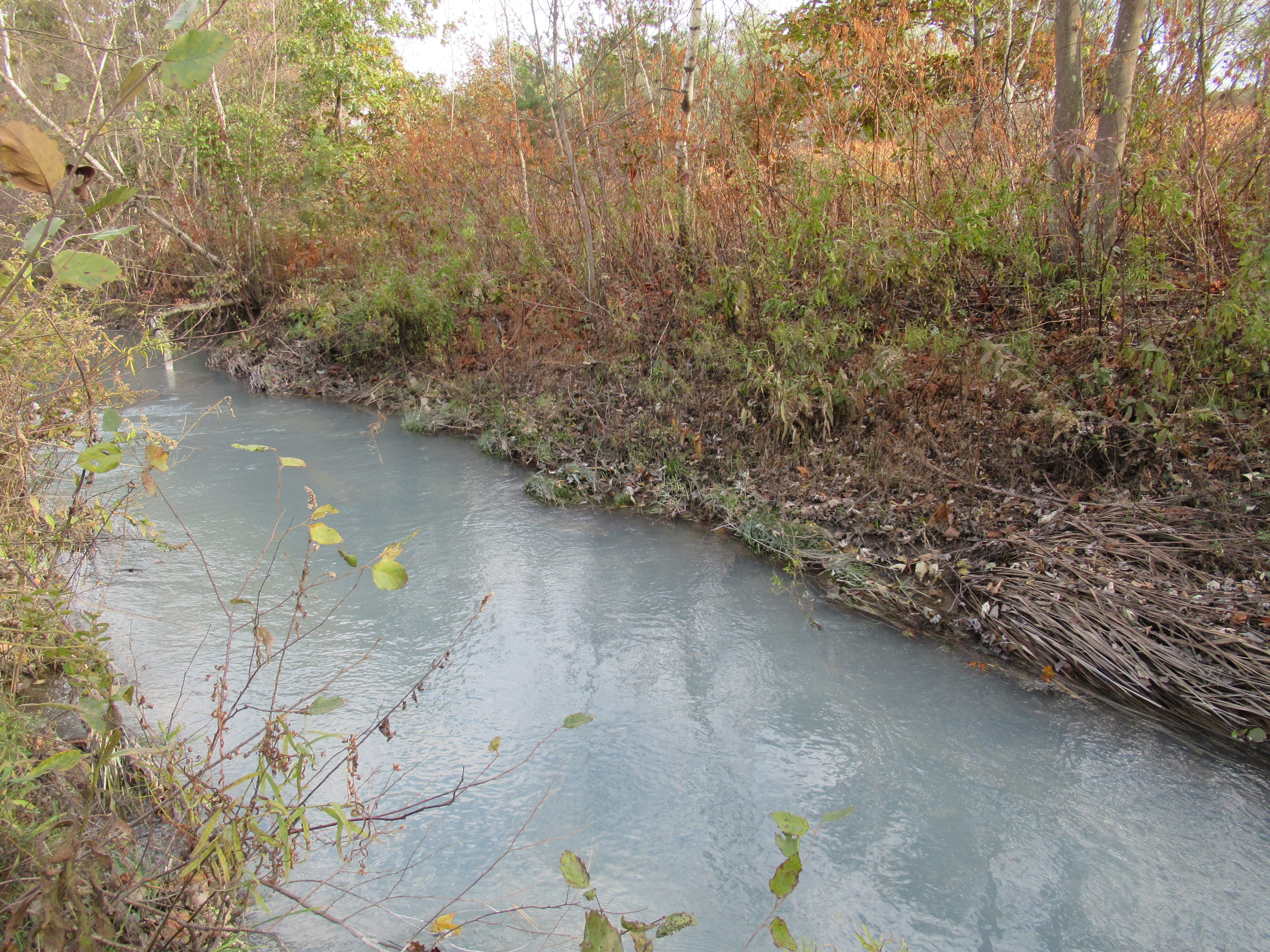
North Branch Shamokin Creek along Route 54 in Mount Carmel Township, PA.

The entire length of North Branch Shamokin Creek is designated as an impaired waterbody and has poor water quality. The cause of the impairment is metals and the source is abandoned mine drainage. In addition to experiencing acidity and metal loading from acid mine drainage sources, the creek is also impacted by flow loss. The flow loss causes it to be an ephemeral stream. Between 1999 and 2003, the creek's discharge was measured four times to be between 2.2 and 14 cubic feet per second (0.062 and 0.396 m^{3}/s) near Mount Carmel.

One site on North Branch Shamokin Creek has been observed to have an acidic pH during low and base flow conditions, but a pH closer to neutral during high flow conditions. The water quality of the creek has improved slightly since the early 2000s. Its average pH has risen from 3.2 to 3.7. The concentrations of acidity and alkalinity in the creek are 81.88 and 1.54 milligrams per liter (0.08179 and 0.00154 oz/cu ft), while the daily loads are 2,082.8 and 39.2 pounds (944.7 and 17.8 kg). Between 1999 and 2003, the water temperature of the creek near Mount Carmel ranged from 9.4 to 20.5 °C (48.9 to 68.9 °F). The specific conductance ranged from 354 to 451 micro-siemens per centimeter at 25 °C (77 °F). The concentration of suspended solids was 14 milligrams per liter (0.014 oz/cu ft) and the concentration of dissolved solids was 256 milligrams per liter (0.256 oz/cu ft). The water hardness ranged from 100 to 124 milligrams per liter (0.100 to 0.124 oz/cu ft). The turbidity of the creek ranged from 0 to 2 Nephelometric Turbidity Units.

The concentrations of manganese and iron in North Branch Shamokin Creek are 2.72 and 9.74 milligrams per liter (0.00272 and 0.00973 oz/cu ft), while the daily loads are 69.2 and 247.8 pounds (31.4 and 112.4 kg). The aluminum concentration is 5.66 milligrams per liter (0.00565 oz/cu ft) and the daily load is 144 pounds (65 kg). It requires a 96 percent reduction to meet its total maximum daily load requirements. In 2000, the concentrations of recoverable sodium and potassium in the creek near Mount Carmel were 4.0 and 1.3 milligrams per liter (0.0040 and 0.0013 oz/cu ft), while the concentrations of recoverable magnesium and calcium were 20.0 and 20.3 milligrams per liter (0.0200 and 0.0203 oz/cu ft).

Between 1999 and 2003, the concentration of dissolved oxygen in North Branch Shamokin Creek near Mount Carmel ranged from 7.7 to 11.0 milligrams per liter (0.0077 to 0.0110 oz/cu ft), the nitrogen concentration was 0.2 milligrams per liter (0.00020 oz/cu ft), the ammonia concentration was 0.180 milligrams per liter (0.000180 oz/cu ft), and the carbon dioxide concentration ranged from 0 to 24 milligrams per liter (0.000 to 0.024 oz/cu ft). The silica concentration ranged from 17 to 18 milligrams per liter (0.017 to 0.018 oz/cu ft) and the phosphorus concentration was less than 10 micrograms per liter (1.00×10^{−5} oz/cu ft) the one time it was measured. The sulfate concentration ranged from 160 to 193 milligrams per liter (0.160 to 0.193 oz/cu ft) and the chloride concentration ranged from 4.1 to 5.8 milligrams per liter (0.0041 to 0.0058 oz/cu ft).

== Geography and geology ==
The elevation near the mouth of North Branch Shamokin Creek is 1,027 feet (313 m) above sea level. The elevation of the creek's source is between 1,480 and 1,500 feet (450 and 460 m) above sea level.

In one reach, North Branch Shamokin Creek passes between two ridges known as Red Ridge and Green Ridge, or Jamies Ridge. There are occurrences of coal in the creek's watershed. One coal bed, where the creek flows between Red Ridge and Green Ridge, has a thickness of up to 14 feet (4.3 m). The creek passes through an axis perpendicular to coal strata in the area.

There are underground mine complexes throughout the watershed of North Branch Shamokin Creek. The Mid Valley Discharge is in the creek's watershed. Half of its flow is lost to the nearby Mahanoy Creek watershed. Some loss in the watershed of North Branch Shamokin Creek also reappears in the watershed of Quaker Run.

North Branch Shamokin Creek is coated with a layer of iron precipitate. It has a permeable streambed.

== Watershed ==
The watershed of North Branch Shamokin Creek has an area of 5.73 square miles (14.8 km^{2}). The mouth of the stream is in the United States Geological Survey quadrangle of Mount Carmel. However, its source is in the quadrangle of Ashland. Communities in the creek's watershed include the borough of Marion Heights and the census-designated place of Strong.

In 2009, Northeastern ITS requested a permit to discharge stormwater into North Branch Shamokin Creek for construction purposes. When the Operation Scarlift report for Shamokin Creek was written, there were no raw sewage discharges into North Branch Shamokin Creek.

== History ==
North Branch Shamokin Creek was entered into the Geographic Names Information System on August 2, 1979. Its identifier in the Geographic Names Information System is 1193040. The creek is also known as Beaver Creek. This name appears in Israel C. White's 1883 book The geology of the North Branch Susquehanna River Region in the six counties of Wyoming, Lackawanna, Luzerne, Columbia, Montour and Northumberland.

A colliery known as Richards Colliery historically drained waste water into North Branch Shamokin Creek. The colliery was owned by the Susquehanna Coal Company and processed 28,200 tons of coal per month.

A prestressed box beam or girders bridge carrying Pennsylvania Route 61 over North Branch Shamokin Creek in 2008 in Atlas. It is 53.2 feet (16.2 m) long. This bridge has been slated for preservation as part of the state of Pennsylvania's "Decade of Investment". A project to remove waste rock piles in the watershed of the creek was carried out in 2006 and 2007. The goal of the project was to improve the water quality of several Operation Scarlift discharges in the watershed, thus reducing mine pollution to the creek. In the early 1900s, the old channel of the creek was occupied by rocks and culm banks.

== Biology ==
The drainage basin of North Branch Shamokin Creek is designated as a Coldwater Fishery and a Migratory Fishery. In 1999, electrofishing in the creek failed to turn up any fish life. It is not stocked by the Pennsylvania Fish and Boat Commission. The creek also lacks any macroinvertebrates and is incapable of supporting aquatic life due to its acidity.

Algae flourishes in a deep mine discharge in the watershed of North Branch Shamokin Creek due to a lack of predators.

== See also ==
- Locust Creek (Shamokin Creek), next tributary of Shamokin Creek going downstream
- List of rivers of Pennsylvania
- List of tributaries of Shamokin Creek
