= Furnace Run (Shamokin Creek tributary) =

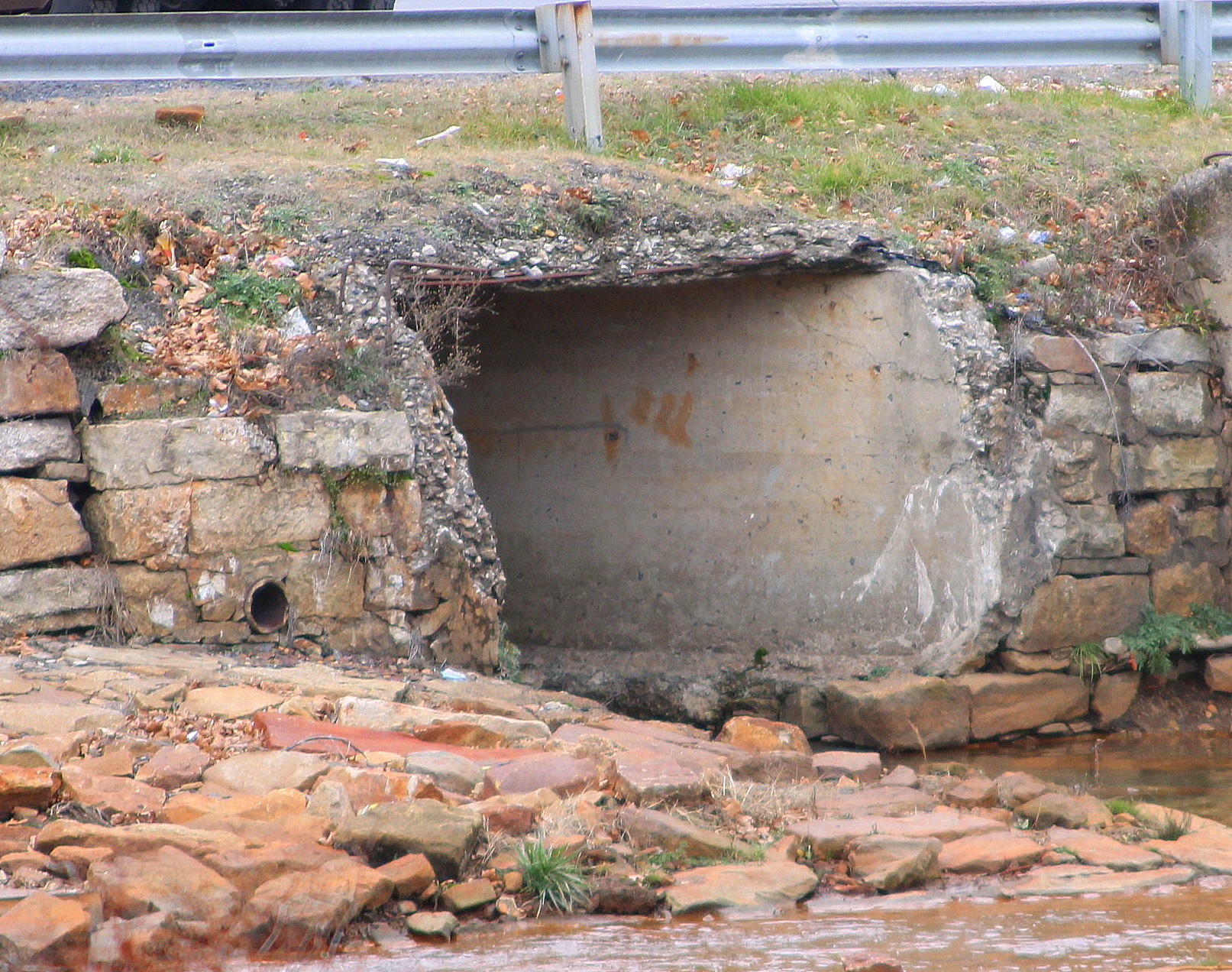
- Mouth of the tunnel carrying Furnace Run
- Etymology: iron furnace built by Henry Myers on the stream in 1825

Physical characteristics
- Source
  - location: small lake in Coal Township, Northumberland County, Pennsylvania
  - elevation: between 840 and 860 feet (256 and 262 m)
- Mouth
  - location: Shamokin Creek in Shamokin, Northumberland County, Pennsylvania
  - coordinates: 40°47′21″N 76°33′47″W
  - elevation: 745 ft (227 m)
- Length: 1.0 mi (1.6 km)
- Basin size: 1.61 mi^{2} (4.2 km^{2})

Basin features
- Progression: Shamokin Creek

Furnace Run is a tributary of Shamokin Creek in Northumberland County, Pennsylvania, in the United States. It is approximately 1.0 mile (1.6 km) long and flows through Coal Township and Shamokin. The watershed of the stream has an area of 1.61 square miles (4.2 km^{2}). It is impaired by sedimentation and siltation from urban runoff and storm sewers, but is not impacted by mine drainage. Reaches of the stream have been entirely enclosed. Furnace Run is named after a furnace that was built in the area in 1825. The stream is designated as a Coldwater Fishery and a Migratory Fishery.

== Course ==
Furnace Run begins in a small lake in Coal Township, in the census-designated place of Fairview-Ferndale. It flows east-northeast for its entire length, almost immediately entering the census-designated place of Edgewood. Several tenths of a mile further downstream, the stream enters Shamokin and reaches its confluence with Shamokin Creek.

Furnace Run joins Shamokin Creek 21.54 miles (34.67 km) upstream of its mouth.

== Hydrology ==
Furnace Run is designated as an impaired waterbody. The cause of the impairment is sedimentation and siltation. The source of the impairment is urban runoff and storm sewers. As of 2006, a total maximum daily load is needed. Discharges of raw sewage also have entered the stream. However, it is not seriously impacted by mine drainage; there are no acid mine drainage discharges in the watershed.

The pH of Furnace Run ranges from 6.6 to 7.5, with an average of 6.9, making it one of the few headwaters tributaries of Shamokin Creek to meet the pH standards of the Pennsylvania Department of Environmental Protection. The iron concentration of the two streams averages 2.5 micrograms per liter (2.5×10^{−6} oz/cu ft), but can reach as high as 4.7 micrograms per liter (4.7×10^{−6} oz/cu ft). On average, the alkalinity concentration of the stream is 54 milligrams per liter (0.054 oz/cu ft). The concentration of dissolved oxygen in the stream ranged from 8.9 to 10.2 milligrams per liter (0.0089 to 0.0102 oz/cu ft). The concentration of aluminum ranged from 0.01 milligrams per liter (1.00×10^{−5} oz/cu ft) to less than 0.20 milligrams per liter (0.00020 oz/cu ft), while the manganese and iron concentrations ranged from 0.05 to 0.08 milligrams per liter (5.0×10^{−5} to 8.0×10^{−5} oz/cu ft) and 0.07 to 0.09 milligrams per liter (7.0×10^{−5} to 9.0×10^{−5} oz/cu ft), respectively. In 1999, the concentration of sodium in the stream was 33 milligrams per liter (0.033 oz/cu ft).

In 1999 and 2000, the concentration of sulfate in Furnace Run ranged from 20 to 24 milligrams per liter (0.020 to 0.024 oz/cu ft). The concentration of nitrogen ranged between 1.20 and 2.0 milligrams per liter (0.00120 and 0.00200 oz/cu ft). In 2000, the concentration of phosphorus was 0.039 milligrams per liter (3.9×10^{−5} oz/cu ft). The chloride concentration was 55 milligrams per liter (0.055 oz/cu ft).

Furnace Run could experience flow augmentation. Mine seepage has contributed flow to the stream. However, in the 1950s, it was diverted into underground mines, reducing the stream's ability to carry away waste in its channel. In 1999 and 2000, the flow rate of the stream ranged from 0.1 to 0.1 cubic feet per second (0.0028 to 0.0028 m^{3}/s). In 1999 and 2000, the water temperature of the stream ranged from 5.8 °C (42.4 °F) in March 2000 to 21.5 °C (70.7 °F) in August 1999.

== Geography, geology, and watershed ==
The elevation near the mouth of Furnace Run is 745 feet (227 m) above sea level. The elevation of the stream's source is between 840 and 860 feet (256 and 262 m) above sea level.

There is an anticlinal in the vicinity of Furnace Run. Bog ore has historically been extracted in the vicinity of the stream. Some reaches of the stream have been fully enclosed.

The watershed of Furnace Run has an area of 1.61 square miles (4.2 km^{2}). The stream is entirely within the United States Geological Survey quadrangle of Shamokin.

== History ==
Furnace Run was entered into the Geographic Names Information System on August 2, 1979. Its identifier in the Geographic Names Information System is 1175361.

Coal mining was being occasionally done in the vicinity of Furnace Run by 1825. Henry Myers constructed an iron furnace on the stream in 1825 on land purchased from Solomon Dunkelberger.

Furnace Run experienced flooding in 2011.

== Biology ==
The drainage basin of Furnace Run is designated as a Coldwater Fishery and a Migratory Fishery. In 1999 and 2000, no fish were observed at one site on the stream.

The concentration of coliform bacteria in Furnace Run was more than 3000 colonies per 100 milliliters in 1999. The concentration of E. coli in the stream was also more than 3000 colonies per 100 milliliters.

== See also ==
- Trout Run (Shamokin Creek), next tributary of Shamokin Creek going downstream
- Carbon Run, next tributary of Shamokin Creek going upstream
- List of rivers of Pennsylvania
- List of tributaries of Shamokin Creek
