= Carbon Run =

Stream in Pennsylvania, United States

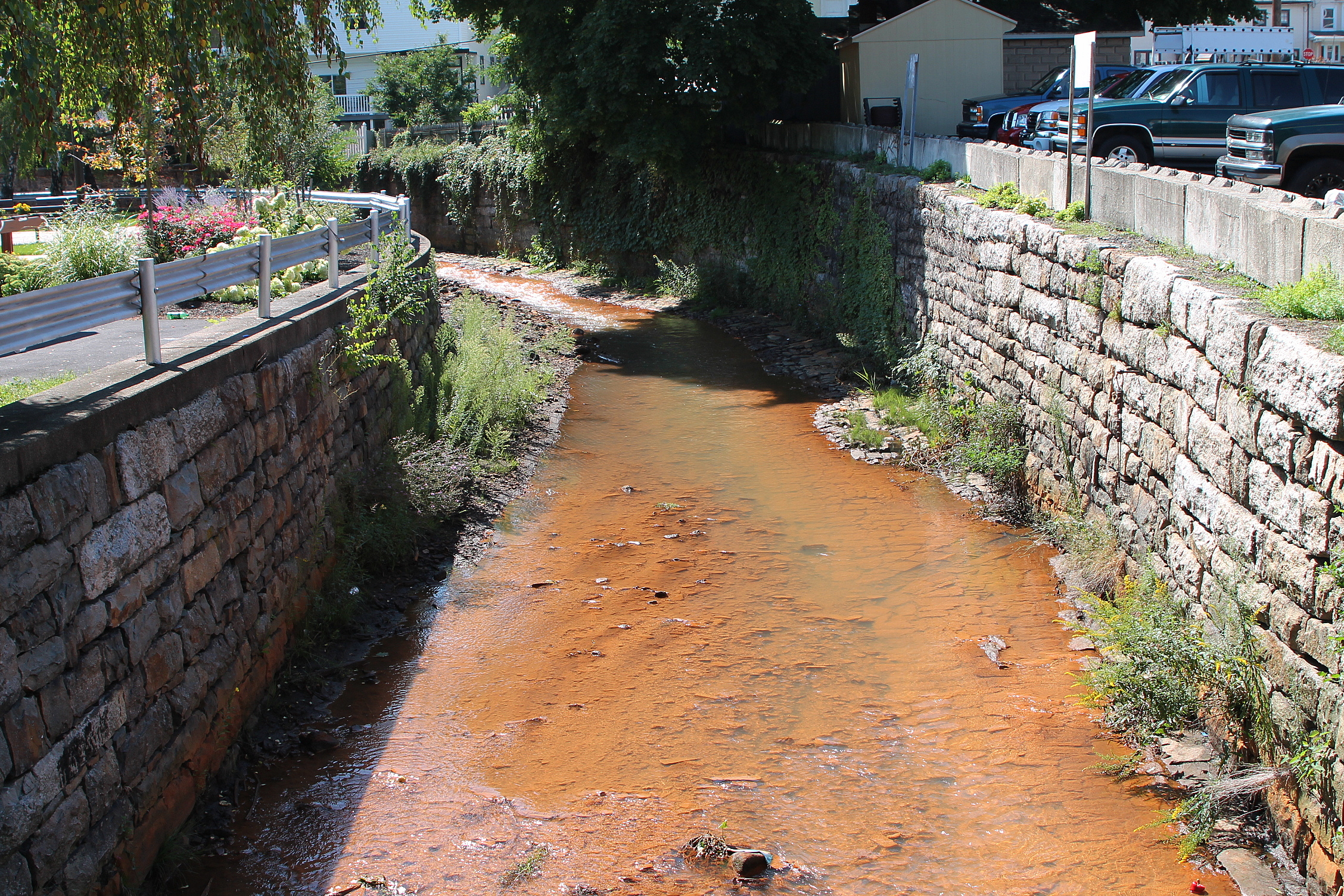
- Carbon Run in Shamokin

Physical characteristics
- Source
  - location: small lake in Zerbe Township, Pennsylvania
  - elevation: between 1,060 and 1,080 feet (320 and 330 m)
- Mouth
  - location: Shamokin Creek in Shamokin, Northumberland County, Pennsylvania
  - coordinates: 40°47′21″N 76°33′47″W
  - elevation: 709 ft (216 m)
- Length: 5.2 mi (8.4 km)
- Basin size: 8.78 mi^{2} (22.7 km^{2})

Basin features
- Progression: Shamokin Creek → Susquehanna River → Chesapeake Bay
- Tributaries
  - left: two unnamed tributaries

Carbon Run is a tributary of Shamokin Creek in Northumberland County, Pennsylvania, in the United States. It is approximately 5.2 miles (8.4 km) long and flows through Zerbe Township, Coal Township, and Shamokin. The watershed of the stream has an area of 8.78 square miles (22.7 km^{2}). Carbon Run is impaired due to metals from acid mine drainage, which colors the stream orange. Metals such as manganese, iron, aluminum, and others occur within its water. The watershed of the stream is in the Coal Region of Pennsylvania. Much of the area in the vicinity of the stream consists of spoil piles and abandoned mining land.

Carbon Run is especially prone to flooding, more so than other streams in its area. Two passive treatment systems have been installed on the stream. A number of bridges and masonry walls have been constructed over and on it. The watershed of the stream is designated as a Coldwater Fishery and a Migratory Fishery. There are no trout inhabiting the stream, but a few fish species and macroinvertebrate taxa have been observed in it.

== Course ==
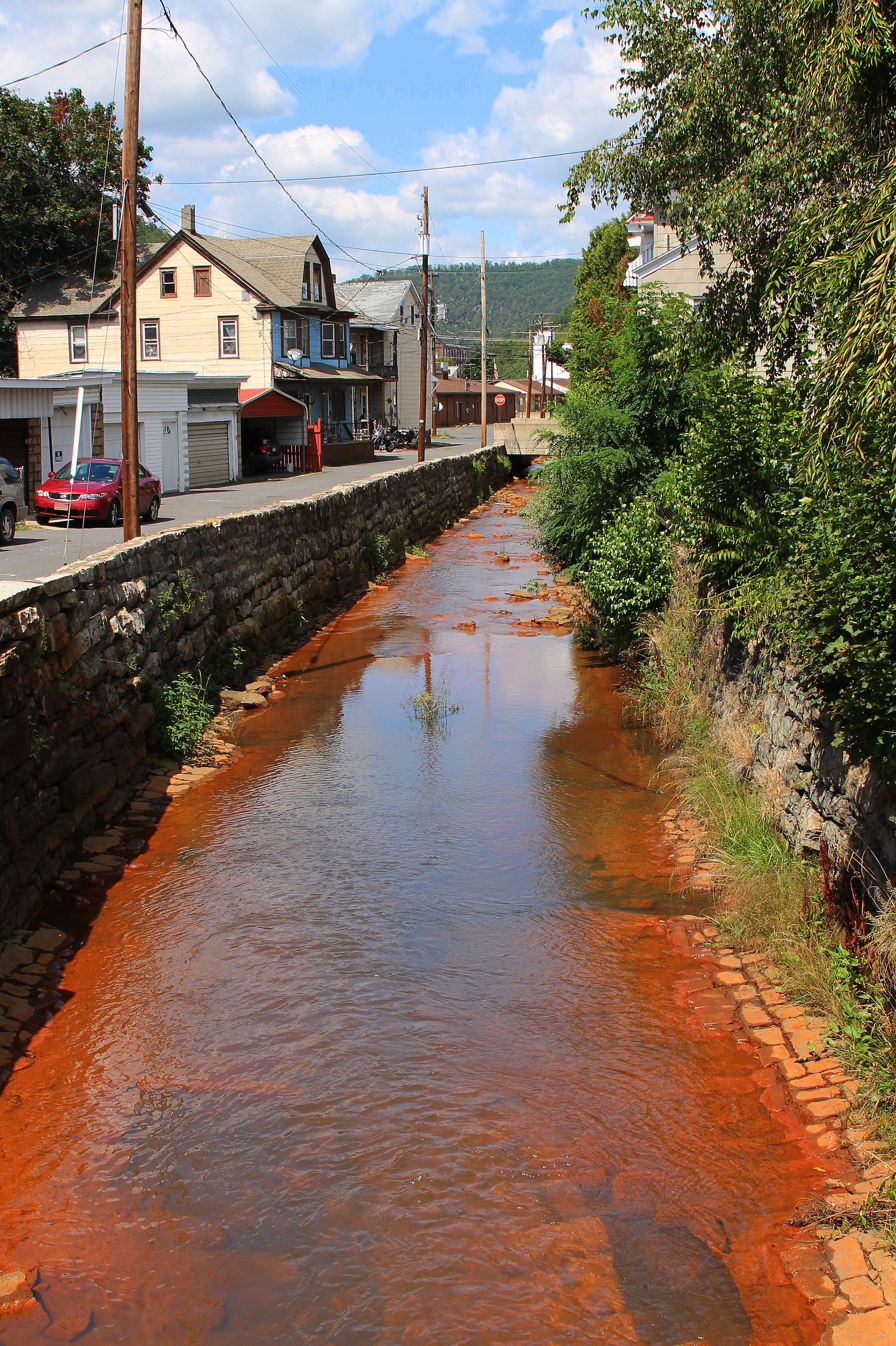
Carbon Run looking downstream in Shamokin

Carbon Run begins in a small lake in Zerbe Township. It flows south for several hundred feet and enters a broad valley. The stream then flows in an east-northeasterly direction for a few miles, though it heads in other directions for short distances. In this reach, it enters Coal Township, receives two unnamed tributaries from the left, and passes through two small lakes. The stream then turns south-southeast for a few tenths of a mile before turning east-northeast again. Its valley narrows and it reaches the census-designated place of Fairview-Ferndale. The stream flows alongside Pennsylvania Route 125 for several tenths of a mile before turning north and entering Shamokin. Several tenths of a mile further downstream, it turns northwest and reaches its confluence with Shamokin Creek.

Carbon Run joins Shamokin Creek 21.62 miles (34.79 km) upstream of its mouth.

== Hydrology ==
The entire length of Carbon Run is designated as an impaired waterbody. The cause of the impairment is metals other than mercury and the source of the impairment is abandoned mine drainage. Its two unnamed tributaries are also impaired. The stream is impacted by acid mine drainage and the Sterling Mine discharge is in its watershed. The acid mine drainage causes it to have an orange color.

The concentration of manganese and iron in Carbon Run at site CAR1 are 2.6 and 14.6 milligrams per liter (0.0026 and 0.0146 oz/cu ft), while the daily loads of these substances are 117.7 and 672.0 pounds (53.4 and 304.8 kg). The concentration of aluminum is 1.1 milligrams per liter (0.0011 oz/cu ft) and the load of aluminum is 51.9 pounds (23.5 kg) per day. This load requires a 90 percent reduction to meet the total maximum daily load requirements.

The concentrations of recoverable sodium and potassium in Carbon Run at Shamokin were once measured to be 5.5 and 2.4 milligrams per liter (0.0055 and 0.0024 oz/cu ft). The magnesium and calcium concentrations were 35.0 and 58.0 milligrams per liter (0.0350 and 0.0579 oz/cu ft).

The concentrations of acidity and alkalinity in Carbon Run are 21.5 and 30.5 milligrams per liter (0.0215 and 0.0305 oz/cu ft). The daily loads of these substances are 991.6 and 1,401.7 pounds (449.8 and 635.8 kg). In 1999 and 2000, the pH of the stream at Shamokin ranged from 6.3 to 6.8. The concentration of suspended solids was once measured to be 24 milligrams per liter (0.024 oz/cu ft), while the concentration of dissolved solids was 424 milligrams per liter (0.424 oz/cu ft). The concentration of dissolved oxygen ranged from 8.5 to 9.7 milligrams per liter (0.0085 to 0.0097 oz/cu ft) and the carbon dioxide concentration ranged from 11 to 14 milligrams per liter (0.011 to 0.014 oz/cu ft). The concentration of water hardness ranged from 283 to 363 milligrams per liter (0.283 to 0.363 oz/cu ft).

The concentration of phosphorus in Carbon Run at Shamokin was once measured to be 0.01 milligrams per liter (1.00×10^{−5} oz/cu ft), while the concentration of orthophosphate was less than 0.031 milligrams per liter (3.1×10^{−5} oz/cu ft) both times it was measured. The silica concentration ranged from 12.0 to 13.0 milligrams per liter (0.0120 to 0.0130 oz/cu ft), while the sulfate concentration ranged from 282 to 350 milligrams per liter (0.282 to 0.350 oz/cu ft) and the chloride concentration ranged from 5.1 to 5.80 milligrams per liter (0.00509 to 0.00579 oz/cu ft). The concentration of ammonia in the stream was once measured to be 0.670 milligrams per liter (0.000669 oz/cu ft). The nitrate and nitrite concentrations in the stream's filtered water were 0.195 milligrams per liter (0.000195 oz/cu ft) and 0.053 milligrams per liter (5.3×10^{−5} oz/cu ft) to less than 0.131 milligrams per liter (0.000131 oz/cu ft).

In 1999 and 2000, the instantaneous discharge of Carbon Run at Shamokin ranged from 3.2 to 18 cubic feet per second (0.091 to 0.510 m^{3}/s) during three measurements. The specific conductance of the stream ranged from 650 to 757 micro-siemens per centimeter at 25 °C (77 °F) during four measurements. The turbidity of the stream ranged from 14 to 44 Nephelometric Turbidity Units.

== Geography and geology ==
The elevation near the mouth of Carbon Run is 709 feet (216 m) above sea level. The elevation of the stream's source is between 1,060 and 1,080 feet (320 and 330 m) above sea level. Carbon Run is a relatively small stream.

There is a dam known as the Bear Valley Dam located on Carbon Run. Spoil piles and abandoned mining land occupies much of the stream's watershed. In some reaches, the stream flows underground due to infiltration into mine pools, but returns to the surface in the form of a discharge. An anticlinal known as Anticlinal No. 8 or Red Ridge ends at the valley of Carbon Run.

There are fifteen abandoned mine drainage discharges in the watershed of Carbon Run. There are also a number of small lakes in the watershed. It is at least partially in the Coal Region. There is a coal field between the stream and the summit of Mahanoy Mountain.

== Watershed ==
The watershed of Carbon Run has an area of 8.78 square miles (22.7 km^{2}). The mouth of the stream is in the United States Geological Survey quadrangle of Shamokin. However, the source is in the quadrangle of Trevorton.

There are two passive treatment systems in the watershed of Carbon Run. They have helped to reduce the stream's acidity and made it able to support aquatic plant and animal life.

Carbon Run is more prone to flooding than any other stream in its vicinity. Its floodplain is distinguishable on Federal Flood Insurance Maps.

== History and recreation ==
Carbon Run was entered into the Geographic Names Information System on August 2, 1979. Its identifier in the Geographic Names Information System is 1171191.

A concrete stringer/multi-beam or girder bridge carrying Willow Street over Carbon Run in Shamokin was built in 1935 and is 26.9 feet (8.2 m) long. A concrete culvert bridge carrying Spruce Street over Carbon Run was built in Shamokin in 1992 and is 25.9 feet (7.9 m) long. In 1993, a bridge of the same type, but carrying Chestnut Street, was constructed over the stream in Shamokin. This bridge is 28.9 feet (8.8 m) long. A third concrete culvert bridge was built over the stream in 1994 in Shamokin and is 24.0 feet (7.3 m) long. This bridge carries Arch Street. Another concrete culvert bridge was constructed over the stream in 1995 and is 23.0 feet (7.0 m) long.

Masonry retaining walls were built on Carbon Run during the Great Depression. A reach of Carbon Run was impacted by flooding in September 2011. The Pennsylvania Department of Conservation and Natural Resources has awarded a $353,000 grant for stream improvements to Carbon Run. These floods also damaged the stream's retaining walls.

The Adventure Anthracite Outdoor Area is in the vicinity of Carbon Run. Non-motorized activities, such as hiking and horseback riding are banned in the area, but there are future plans to accommodate them.

== Biology ==
The drainage basin of Carbon Run is designated as a Coldwater Fishery and a Migratory Fishery. The fish populations in the stream are considerably lower than those of other streams of a similar size in the area. In 2011, the defunct organization Habitat for Wildlife released a thousand small brook trout (2 to 3 inches (5.1 to 7.6 cm) in length) from the Zion Grove Trout Hatchery into the stream. However, by September 2012, electrofishing surveys failed to find any trout. In 2012, it was possible that the stream would be stocked with trout in spring 2013 to give the area a "mental boost".

It is difficult for fish to survive in Carbon Run because it contains few of the varieties of insects that fish tend to eat. However, in 2011, satisfactory insect populations were observed. However, a few fish species have been observed in the stream. These include creek chubs, pumpkinseeds, and brown bullheads. Creek chubs are abundant in the stream, meaning that more than 75 individuals were observed. Pumpkinseeds were common, meaning that 25 to 75 individuals were observed. However, only one brown bullhead was found. Some time ago, in 1840, Carbon Run was "filled with trout".

Macroinvertebrates began to repopulate Carbon Run by the 2000s due to the passive treatment systems in the watershed. In the 1990s, three individuals from the genus Tipula, an individual from the family Rhyacophilidae, and an individual from the order Plecoptera were observed in the stream upstream of Scarlift Discharge 42. A small unnamed tributary to Carbon Run hosted various caddisflies, mayflies, stoneflies, and minnows. However, immediately downstream of Scarlift Discharge 42, no macroinvertebrates were observed.

== See also ==
- Furnace Run, next tributary of Shamokin Creek going downstream
- Coal Run, next tributary of Shamokin Creek going upstream
- List of rivers of Pennsylvania
- List of tributaries of Shamokin Creek
