= Coal Run (Shamokin Creek tributary) =

Creek in Pennsylvania, US

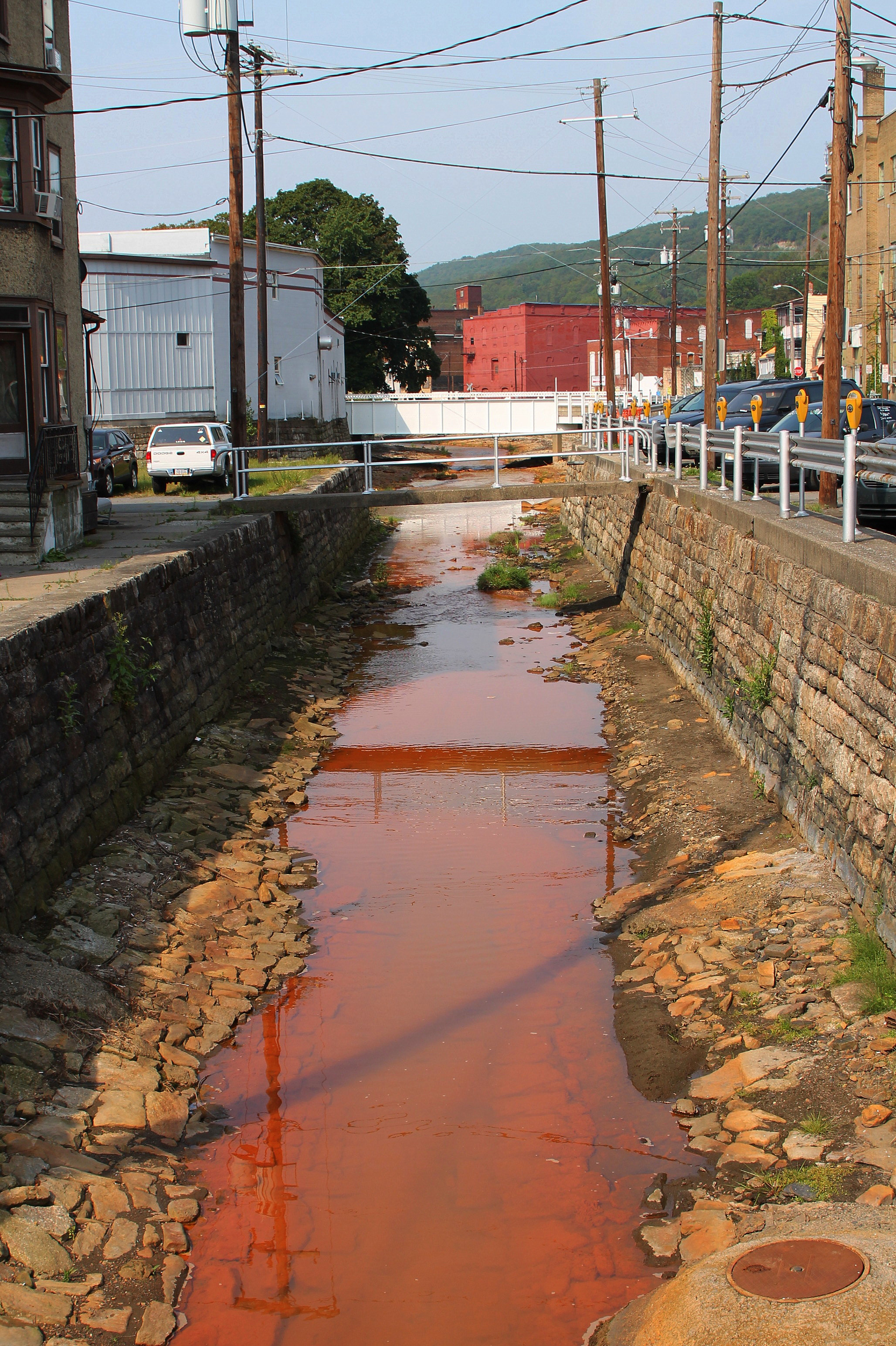
- Coal Run looking downstream in Shamokin

Physical characteristics
- Source
  - location: lake in Mount Carmel Township, Northumberland County, Pennsylvania
  - elevation: between 1,220 and 1,240 feet (370 and 380 m)
- Mouth
  - location: Shamokin Creek in Shamokin, Northumberland County, Pennsylvania
  - coordinates: 40°47′29″N 76°33′11″W
  - elevation: 725 ft (221 m)
- Length: 4.7 mi (7.6 km)
- Basin size: 6.25 mi^{2} (16.2 km^{2})

Basin features
- Progression: Shamokin Creek → Susquehanna River → Chesapeake Bay

Coal Run is a tributary of Shamokin Creek in Northumberland County, Pennsylvania, in the United States. It is approximately 4.7 miles (7.6 km) long and flows through Mount Carmel Township, Coal Township, and Shamokin. The watershed of the stream has an area of 6.25 square miles (16.2 km^{2}). The stream is designated as an impaired waterbody due to metals from abandoned mine drainage. It is an ephemeral stream. Virtually all of the watershed is in coal mining areas.

Various sawmills and coal mines have historically been constructed on Coal Run. A number of bridges have also been built across the stream. Its drainage basin is designated as a Coldwater Fishery and a Migratory Fishery and was historically inhabited by trout.

== Course ==
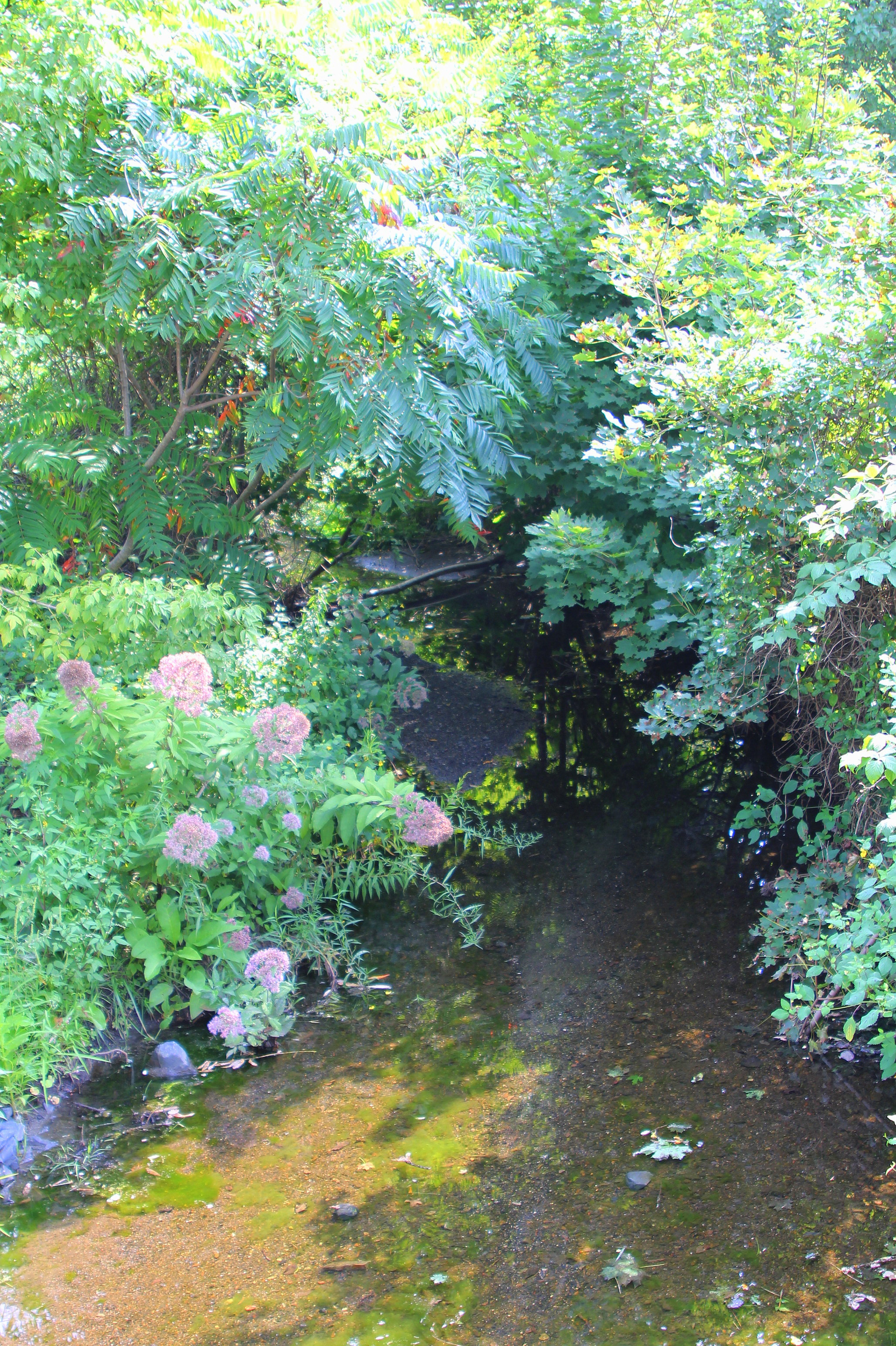
Coal Run in its upper reaches, looking upstream

Coal Run begins in a lake in Mount Carmel Township. It flows east-southeast through a valley for several tenths of a mile before entering Coal Township. The stream continues flowing east-southeast for more than a mile before turning south for a short distance. It then turns southwest for a few tenths of a mile before turning south for a few tenths of a mile. After this, the stream crosses Pennsylvania Route 61 and passes near the census-designated place of Ranshaw. The stream then flows in a west-northwesterly direction for several tenths of a mile, passing through the census-designated place of Marshalton before entering Shamokin. The stream then flows west for a few tenths of a mile until it reaches its confluence with Shamokin Creek.

Coal Run joins Shamokin Creek 22.5 miles (36.2 km) upstream of its mouth.

== Hydrology ==
The entire length of Coal Run is designated as an impaired waterbody. The cause of the impairment is metals and the source of the impairment is abandoned mine drainage. The stream is one of several in the watershed of Shamokin Creek to be impacted by abandoned mine drainage, although it is not seriously impacted. However, it is fairly consistently neutral or alkaline, with an average pH of 6.5, though its pH can be as low as 4.8. The stream's water comes from mine discharges such as the Greenough Mine discharge, the Nielson Mine discharge, and the Luke Fidler Mine discharge. The stream is also impacted by raw sewage discharges. In the early 1900s, mine water from the Richards No. 4 Colliery entered the stream. Numerous other streams of black waste water from other collieries discharged into the stream as well.

Coal Run is an ephemeral stream. In 1999 and 2000, its discharge ranged from 0.10 to 1.5 cubic feet per second (0.0028 to 0.0425 m^{3}/s). The temperature of the stream ranged from 9.5 to 15.7 °C (49.1 to 60.3 °F) and the specific conductance ranged between 613 and 627 micro-siemens per centimeter at 25 °C (77 °F). The concentration of water hardness ranged from 224 to 259 milligrams per liter (0.224 to 0.259 oz/cu ft) in the two times it was measured. The concentration of total suspended solids was 14 milligrams per liter (0.014 oz/cu ft) in 2000, while the concentration of total dissolved solids was 396 milligrams per liter (0.396 oz/cu ft). The turbidity of the stream ranged from 0.0 to 4.0 Nephelometric Turbidity Units.

In 2000, the concentrations of recoverable sodium and potassium in Coal Run were 97.0 and 2.70 milligrams per liter (0.09689 and 0.00270 oz/cu ft). The concentrations of recoverable magnesium and calcium were 23.9 and 73.7 milligrams per liter (0.0239 and 0.0736 oz/cu ft). The concentrations of recoverable manganese and iron were 1,340 and 3,130 micrograms per liter (0.00134 and 0.00313 oz/cu ft), while the concentration of recoverable aluminum was less than 200 micrograms per liter (0.00020 oz/cu ft).

In 1999 and 2000, the concentration of dissolved oxygen in Coal Run ranged from 6.7 to 8.2 milligrams per liter (0.0067 to 0.0082 oz/cu ft), while the carbon dioxide concentration was 47 milligrams per liter (0.047 oz/cu ft) both times it was measured. In 2000, the nitrogen concentration was 1.6 milligrams per liter (0.0016 oz/cu ft). The phosphorus concentration was 0.060 milligrams per liter (6.0×10^{−5} oz/cu ft). The silica concentration in the stream's filtered water was 11.0 milligrams per liter (0.0110 oz/cu ft), the sulfate concentration ranged from 144 to 170 milligrams per liter (0.144 to 0.170 oz/cu ft) and the chloride concentration ranged from 37.0 to 105 milligrams per liter (0.0370 to 0.1049 oz/cu ft). The concentration of nitrite was less than 0.131 milligrams per liter (0.000131 oz/cu ft), while the ammonia concentration in unfiltered water was 0.773 milligrams per liter (0.000772 oz/cu ft).

== Geography and geology ==
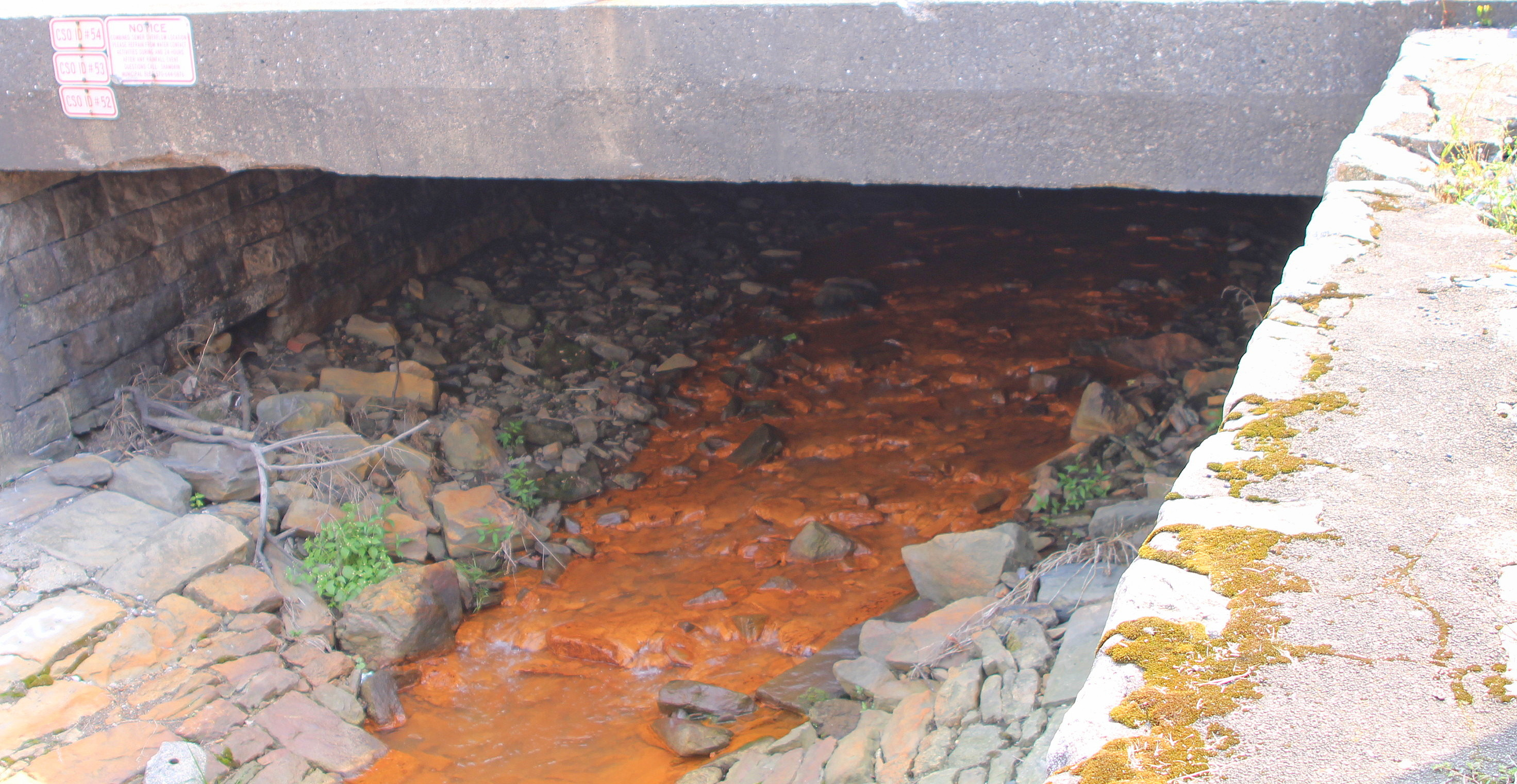
Coal Run looking upstream as it emerges from underground

The elevation near the mouth of Coal Run is 725 feet (221 m) above sea level. The elevation of the stream's source is between 1,220 and 1,240 feet (370 and 380 m) above sea level.

Coal deposits occur in the watershed of Coal Run. There are also underground mine complexes in the vicinity of the stream. Almost all of the watershed is in the Coal Region.

In the early 1900s, fine culm was carried into Coal Run via waste water streams from collieries. However, there were no large culm deposits on the stream below the Hickory Ridge Colliery. Trash and sewage entered the stream at Shamokin.

== Watershed ==
The watershed of Coal Run has an area of 6.25 square miles (16.2 km^{2}). The mouth of the stream is in the United States Geological Survey quadrangle of Shamokin. However, its source is in the quadrangle of Mount Carmel.

The designated uses of Coal Run are coal water and migratory fishes.

== History ==
Coal Run was entered into the Geographic Names Information System on August 2, 1979. Its identifier in the Geographic Names Information System is 1172073. The stream is also known as Coal Run Creek.

John C. Boyd constructed a sawmill on Coal Run in the early 1800s. Coal mining was being occasionally done in the vicinity of the stream by 1825. In 1828, Daniel Derk opened a mine on Coal Run near a public road that crossed the stream. Derk was injured while working in this mine, making him the first miner to be injured in Northumberland County.

A railroad bridge historically crossed Coal Run. In the early 1900s, J.H. & C.K. Eagle, Inc. requested permission to construct a coal dredging plant on the bank of the stream.

In the early 1900s, there were several collieries and washeries in the watershed of Coal Run. These included the Hickory Ridge Colliery, the Luke Fiddler Colliery, the Hickory Swamp Washery, the Natalie Colliery, and the Colbert Colliery. The first three were owned by the Susquehanna Coal Company, the fourth was owned by the Colonial Collieries Company, and the fifth was owned by the Shipman Coal Company.

A concrete slab bridge carrying State Route 2026 over Coal Run was built in 1938. It is 41.0 feet (12.5 m) long and is located in the village of Coal Run. A concrete channel beam bridge carrying State Route 2017 was built over the stream in 1952 and repaired in 2007. This bridge is 30.8 feet (9.4 m) long and is located in the village of Springfield. A concrete culvert bridge was built over the stream 2 miles (3.2 km) south of Paxinos in 1970. This bridge is 22.0 feet (6.7 m) long and carries State Route 8001.

== Biology ==
The drainage basin of Coal Run is designated as a Coldwater Fishery and a Migratory Fishery. Historically, in around 1840, the stream was "filled with trout".

== See also ==
- Carbon Run, next tributary of Shamokin Creek going downstream
- Quaker Run, next tributary of Shamokin Creek going upstream
- List of rivers of Pennsylvania
- List of tributaries of Shamokin Creek
