= Trout Run (Shamokin Creek tributary) =

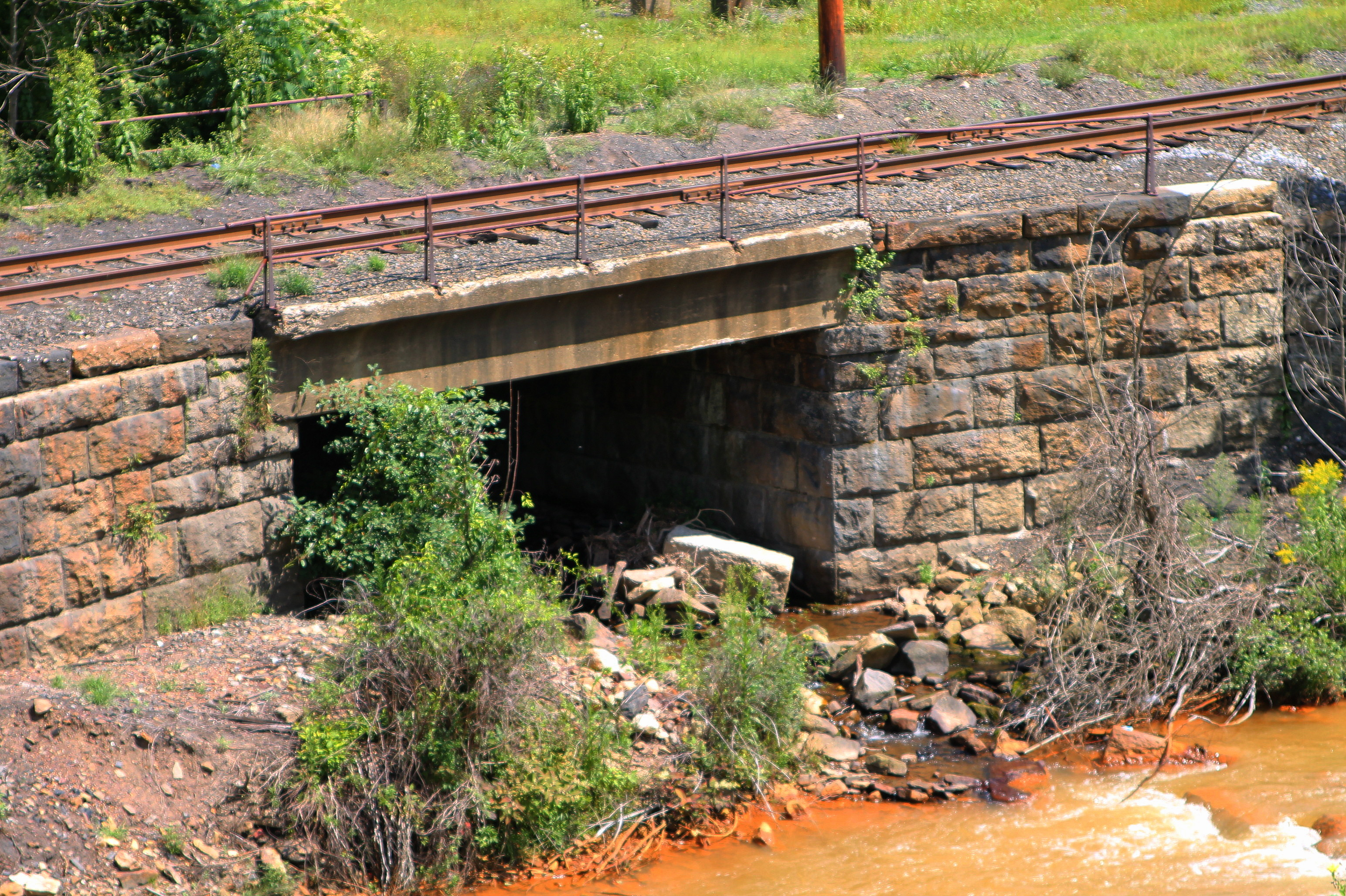
- Mouth of Trout Run

Physical characteristics
- Source
  - location: Number Four Reservoir in Coal Township, Northumberland County, Pennsylvania
  - elevation: between 880 and 900 feet (268 and 274 m)
- Mouth
  - location: Shamokin Creek in Coal Township, Northumberland County, Pennsylvania
  - coordinates: 40°48′16″N 76°34′08″W
  - elevation: 656 ft (200 m)
- Length: 1.4 mi (2.3 km)
- Basin size: 3.01 mi^{2} (7.8 km^{2})

Basin features
- Progression: Shamokin Creek → Susquehanna River → Chesapeake Bay

Trout Run is a tributary of Shamokin Creek in Northumberland County, Pennsylvania, in the United States. It is approximately 1.4 miles (2.3 km) long and flows through Coal Township. The watershed of the stream has an area of 3.01 square miles (7.8 km^{2}). The stream is not designated as impaired and has a high level of water quality. It flows through a valley between Big Mountain and Little Mountain. A reservoir is located in the stream's watershed and it has been used as a water supply. The stream is designated as a Coldwater Fishery and a Migratory Fishery and supports aquatic life.

== Course ==
Trout Run begins in the Number Four Reservoir in Coal Township. It heads west-southwest for several tenths of a mile, flowing through a broad, deep valley between two ridges. The stream then turns west-northwest for a short distance before turning southwest. Several tenths of a mile further downstream, it reaches its confluence with Shamokin Creek.

Trout Run joins Shamokin Creek 20.48 miles (32.96 km) upstream of its mouth.

== Hydrology ==
Trout Run is not designated as an impaired waterbody. The stream has a high level of water quality and no part of it or any of its tributaries is designated as impaired.

== Geography and geology ==
The elevation near the mouth of Trout Run is 656 feet (200 m) above sea level. The elevation of the stream's source is between 880 and 900 feet (268 and 274 m) above sea level. Trout Run is a relatively small stream.

The watershed of Trout Run is just north of the mining region. However, the stream itself is not impacted by mining. The stream drains part of the valley between Big Mountain and Little Mountain. Red shale of the Mauch Chunk Formation occurs in this valley. The valley is known as Brush Valley.

A dam known as the Trout Run Dam Number 4 is located on Trout Run. As of 1980, it is in good condition.

== Watershed ==
The watershed of Trout Run has an area of 3.01 square miles (7.8 km^{2}). The stream is entirely within the United States Geological Survey quadrangle of Shamokin.

The watershed of Trout Run is in the central part of the Shamokin Creek drainage basin. It is roughly rectangular and longer than it is wide. The community of Uniontown is near the mouth of the stream.

Trout Run mainly flows through forested land. In addition to historically being used as a water supply for Shamokin, it is used as a water supply for the Coal Township State Prison Complex.

== History ==
Trout Run was entered into the Geographic Names Information System on August 2, 1979. Its identifier in the Geographic Names Information System is 1189852.

A dam known as the No. 4 Dam has existed on Trout Run since at least the early 1900s. During this time period, it was owned by the Shamokin Water Company. The Roaring Creek Water Company also owned a No. 3 Dam during the early 1900s. A reservoir was created on the stream in the late 1800s and used as a water supply; gravity caused the water to flow through a 12-inch (30-centimeter) wooden main towards Shamokin. However, Trout Run was unable to keep up with the demand, so in 1886, a 16-inch (40-centimeter) pipe connecting the watershed of Roaring Creek with the headwaters of Trout Run was constructed.

A channel restoration project involving 450 tons of riprap on 120 feet (37 m) of Trout Run was carried out after Hurricane Eloise.

In 2015, the watershed of Trout Run was proposed as a site for the new Northumberland County Prison. However, a member of the Brush Valley Preservation Association was opposed to the idea.

== Biology ==
The drainage basin of Trout Run is designated as a Coldwater Fishery and a Migratory Fishery. A small hatchery near the mouth of the stream is maintained by a group of local sportsmen. The stream has historically supported a healthy community of aquatic life and supports some aquatic life.

== See also ==
- Bennys Run, next tributary of Shamokin Creek going downstream
- Furnace Run (Shamokin Creek), next tributary of Shamokin Creek going upstream
- List of rivers of Pennsylvania
- List of tributaries of Shamokin Creek
