= Lick Creek (Shamokin Creek tributary) =

River in Pennsylvania, United States

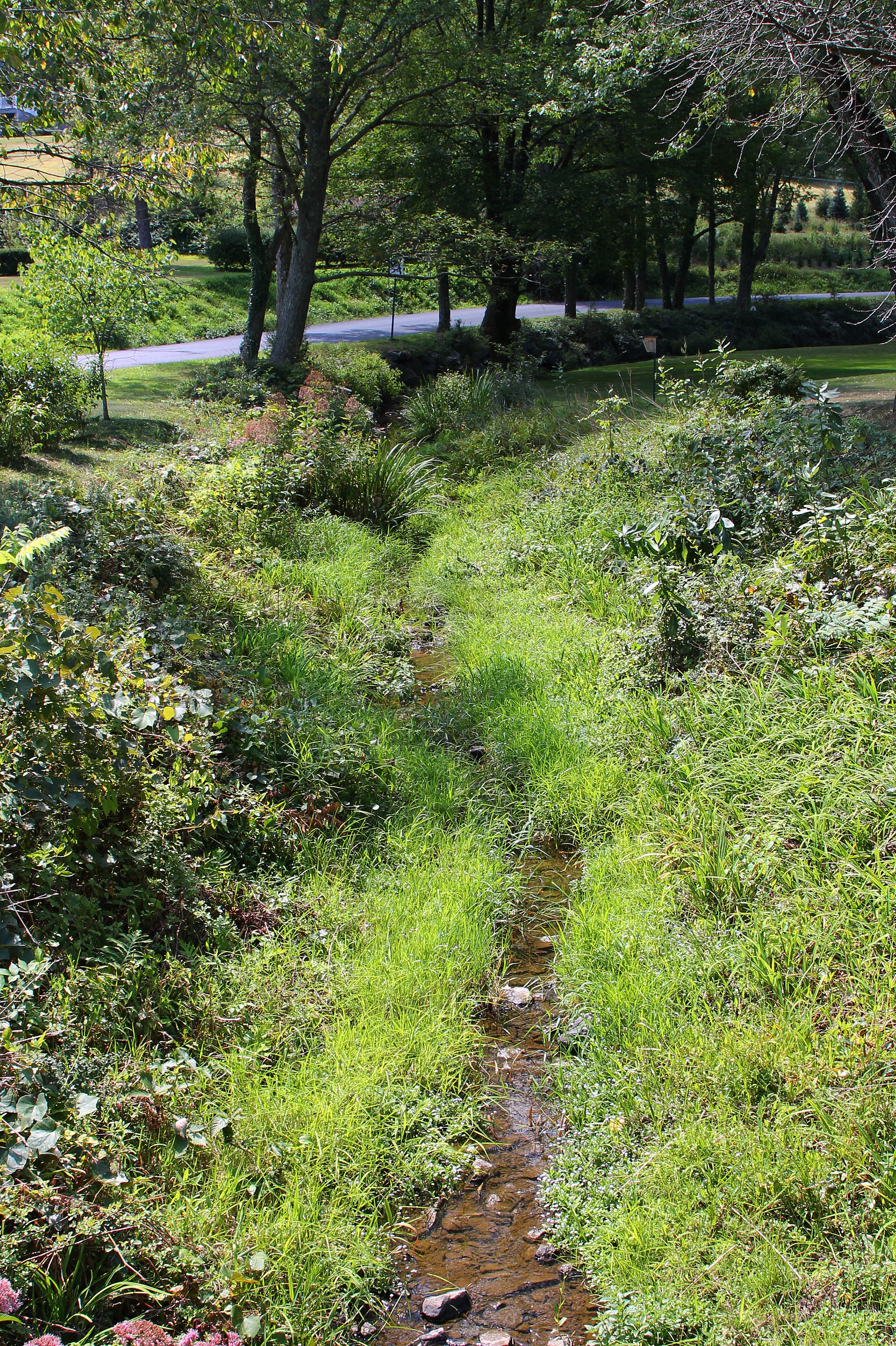
- Lick Creek looking upstream

Physical characteristics
- Source
  - location: valley on a ridge in Shamokin Township, Pennsylvania
  - elevation: between 960 and 980 feet (290 and 300 m)
- Mouth
  - location: Shamokin Creek in Shamokin Township, Pennsylvania
  - coordinates: 40°50′58″N 76°35′14″W
  - elevation: 545 ft (166 m)
- Length: 2.7 mi (4.3 km)
- Basin size: 2.46 sq mi (6.4 km^{2})

Basin features
- Progression: Shamokin Creek → Susquehanna River → Chesapeake Bay
- Tributaries
  - left: three unnamed tributaries
  - right: one unnamed tributary

Lick Creek is a tributary of Shamokin Creek in Northumberland County, Pennsylvania, in the United States. It is approximately 2.7 miles (4.3 km) long and flows through Shamokin Township. The watershed of the creek has an area of 2.46 square miles (6.4 km^{2}). The creek is not designated as impaired and its watershed is designated as a Coldwater Fishery and a Migratory Fishery. It supports some aquatic life.

== Course ==
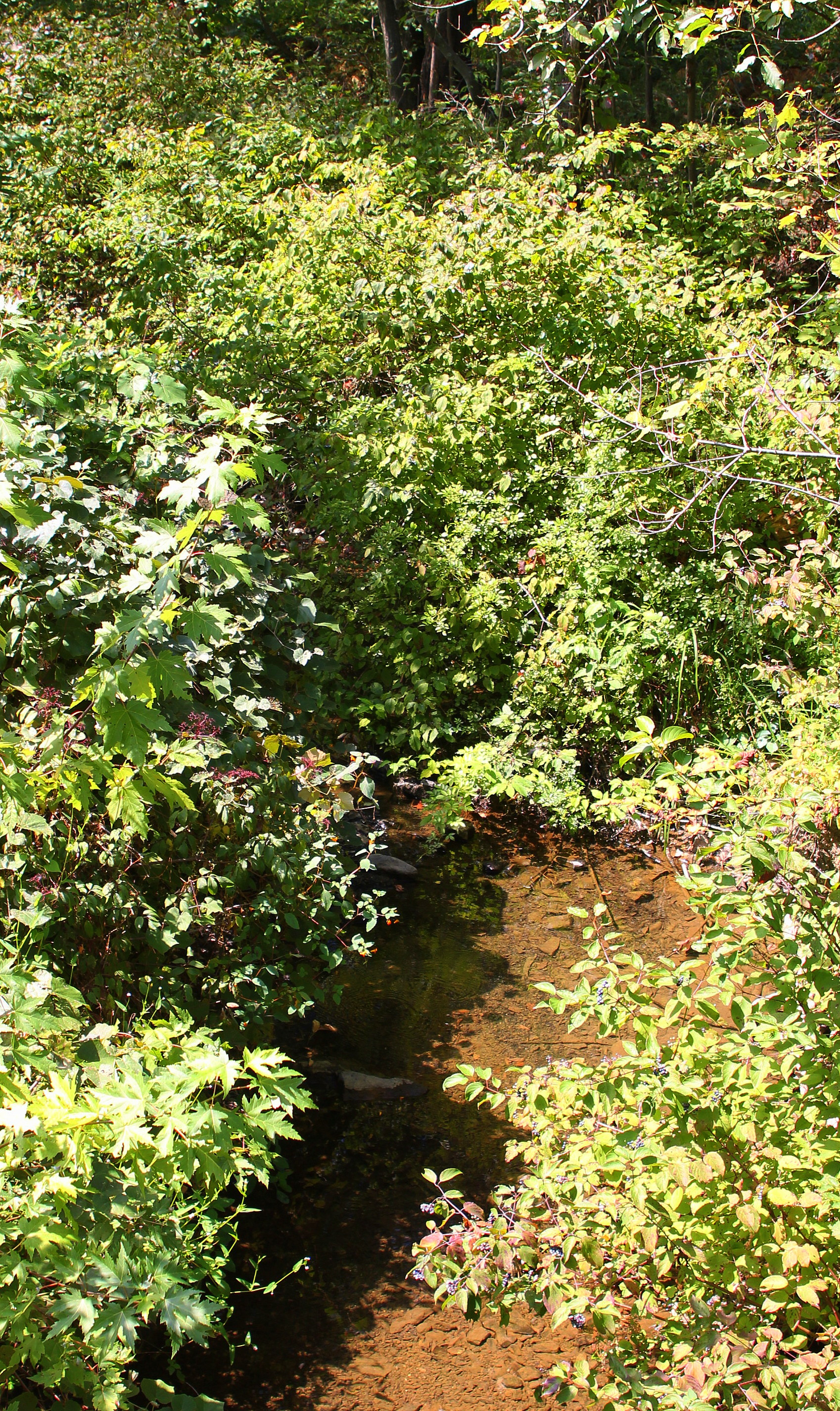
Lick Creek looking downstream

Lick Creek begins in a valley on a ridge in Shamokin Township. It flows east-northeast for several tenths of a mile before turning north and receiving an unnamed tributary from the right. The creek then turns north for a few tenths of a mile, entering a much broader valley and receiving an unnamed tributary from the left. The creek then turns east for more than a mile and receives two more unnamed tributaries from the left before turning north-northeast and then east. It then turns northeast for a short distance and crosses Pennsylvania Route 61 before reaching its confluence with Shamokin Creek.

Lick Creek joins Shamokin Creek 16.03 miles (25.80 km) upstream of its mouth.

=== Tributaries ===
Lick Creek has no named tributaries. However, it does have a number of unnamed tributaries. At least one of these is intermittent.

== Hydrology, geography and geology ==
The elevation near the mouth of Lick Creek is 545 feet (166 m) above sea level. The elevation of the creek's source is between 960 and 980 feet (290 and 300 m) above sea level.

Lick Creek is not impacted by mining. The creek has a relatively high level of water quality. All streams in the creek's watershed meet at least one designated use and none are impaired.

== Watershed ==
The watershed of Lick Creek has an area of 2.46 square miles (6.4 km^{2}). The mouth of the creek is in the United States Geological Survey quadrangle of Shamokin. However, its source is in the quadrangle of Trevorton.

The watershed of Lick Creek is in the lower part of the Shamokin Creek drainage basin and in the middle of the latter watershed's northern part.

== History ==
Lick Creek was entered into the Geographic Names Information System on August 2, 1979. Its identifier in the Geographic Names Information System is 1179280.

== Biology ==
The drainage basin of Lick Creek is designated as a Coldwater Fishery and a Migratory Fishery. Some aquatic life exists in the creek and it historically contained a healthy aquatic community.

== See also ==
- Little Shamokin Creek, next tributary of Shamokin Creek going downstream
- Millers Run, next tributary of Shamokin Creek going upstream
- List of rivers of Pennsylvania
- List of tributaries of Shamokin Creek
