= Locust Creek (Shamokin Creek tributary) =

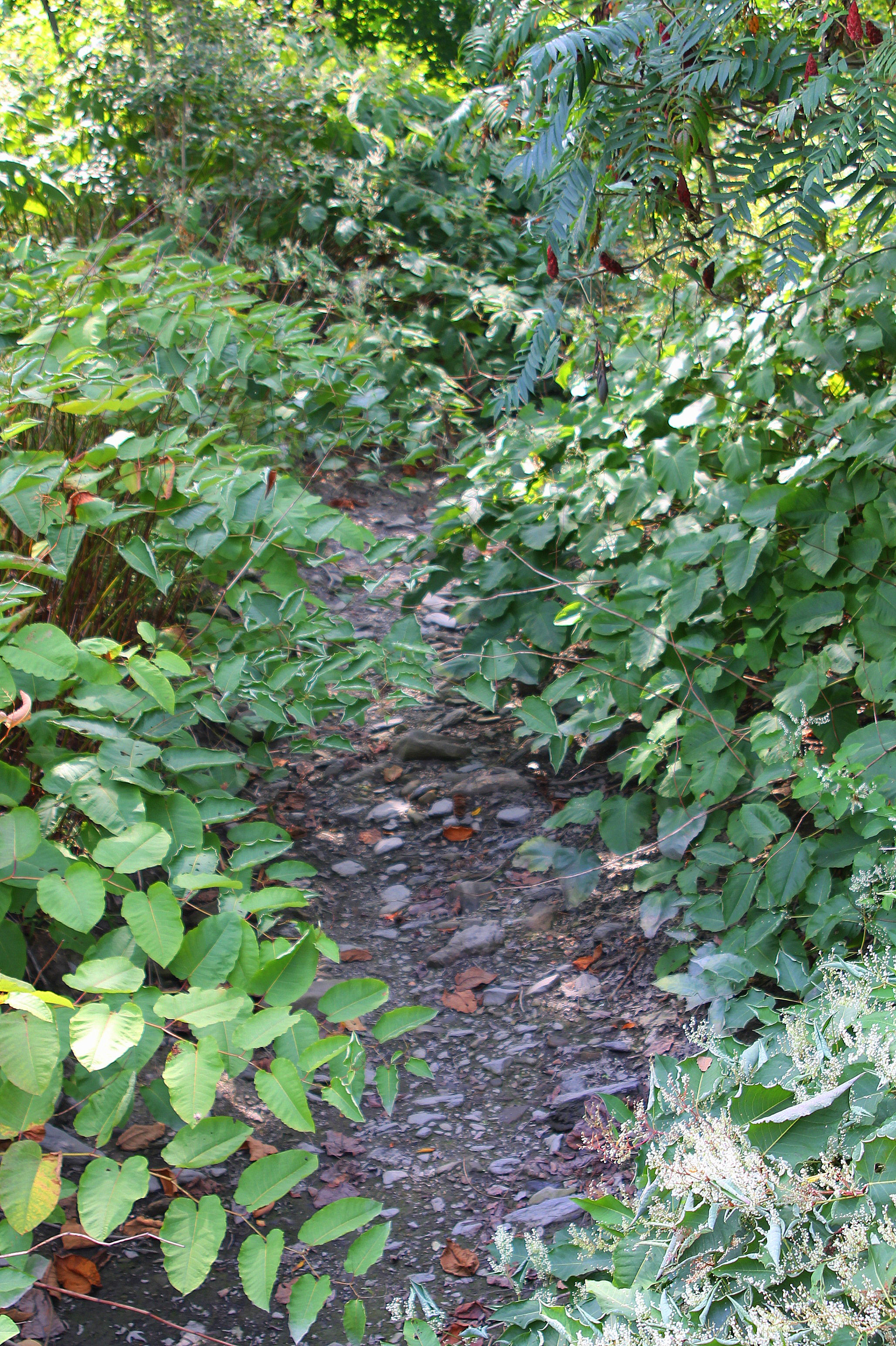
- Locust Creek

Physical characteristics
- Source
  - location: pond in East Cameron Township, Northumberland County, Pennsylvania
  - elevation: between 1,340 and 1,360 feet (408 and 415 m)
- Mouth
  - location: Shamokin Creek in Mount Carmel Township, Pennsylvania
  - coordinates: 40°46′54″N 76°27′22″W
  - elevation: 1,010 ft (310 m)
- Length: 4.0 mi (6.4 km)
- Basin size: 5.75 sq mi (14.9 km^{2})

Basin features
- Progression: Shamokin Creek → Susquehanna River → Chesapeake Bay
- Tributaries
  - right: one unnamed tributary

Locust Creek is a tributary of Shamokin Creek in Northumberland County, Pennsylvania, in the United States. It is approximately 4.0 miles (6.4 km) long and flows through East Cameron Township and Mount Carmel Township. The watershed of the creek has an area of 5.75 square miles (14.9 km^{2}). The stream is designated as impaired due to metals from abandoned mine drainage. It also experiences a low pH. The creek flows through a water gap in Locust Mountain. Prominent land uses in its watershed include refuse areas and forested land. The creek's watershed is designated as a Coldwater Fishery and a Migratory Fishery.

== Course ==
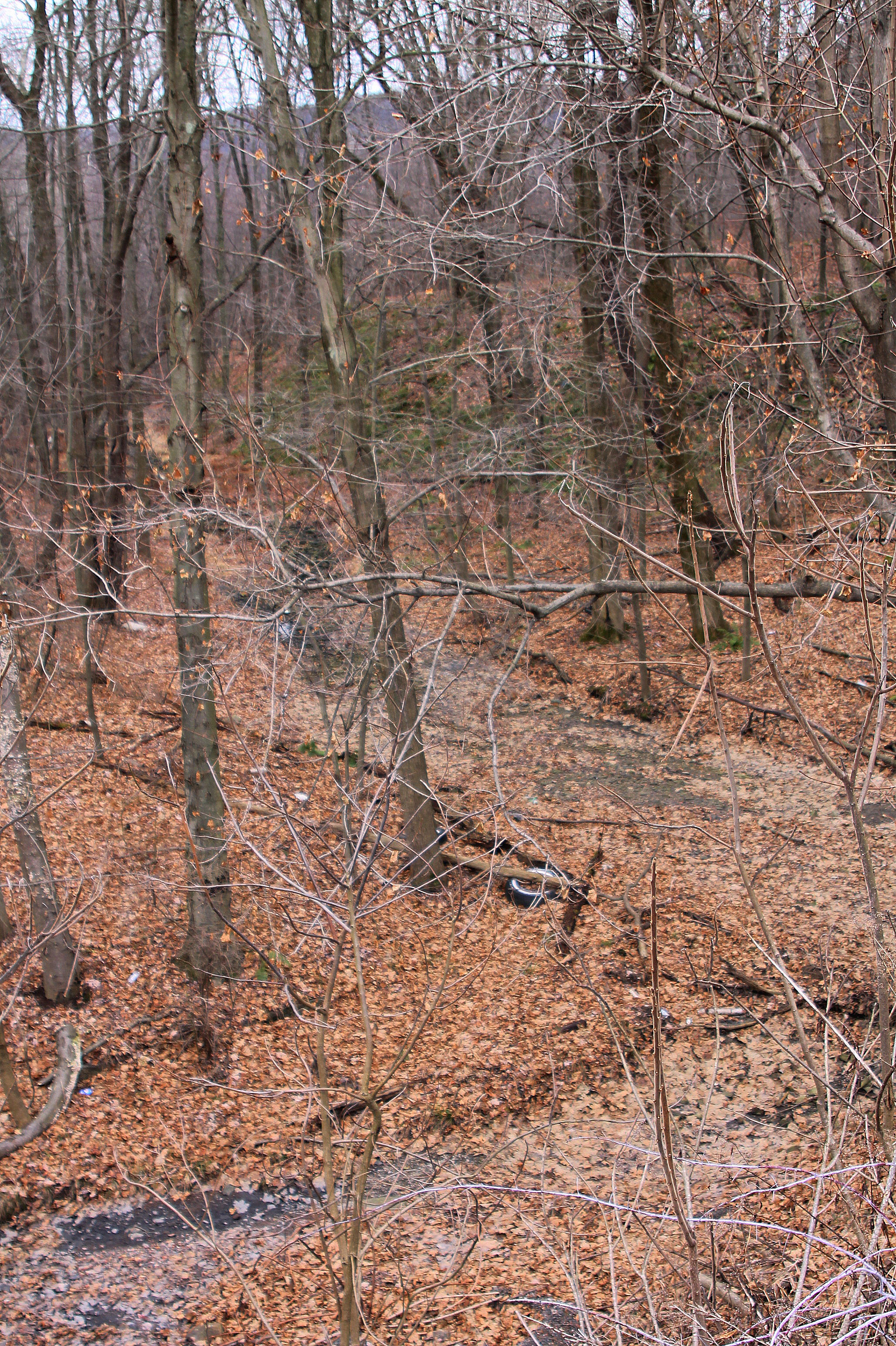
Locust Creek looking upstream from Marshall Street in December

Locust Creek begins in a pond in East Cameron Township. It flows east-northeast through a deep, broad valley for several tenths of a mile before entering Mount Carmel Township. The creek flows east-northeast for more than a mile before receiving an unnamed tributary from the right and abruptly turning north-northwest. For the next several tenths of a mile, it flows alongside Pennsylvania Route 54 through a water gap. The stream then leaves the water gap, crosses Pennsylvania Route 901, and turns west. A few tenths of a mile further downstream, it reaches its confluence with Shamokin Creek.

Locust Creek joins Shamokin Creek 28.88 miles (46.48 km) upstream of its mouth.

=== Tributaries ===
Locust Creek has no named tributaries, but it has one unnamed tributary. This tributary is known as UNT #18656 and 1 mile (1.6 km) of it is an impaired waterbody.

== Hydrology ==
Locust Creek has poor water quality. The entire length of Locust Creek is designated as an impaired waterbody. The cause of the impairment is metals and the source is abandoned mine drainage. The acid mine drainage impacts to the creek are severe.

Locust Creek is an intermittent stream, with some ephemeral reaches. It is fed by several mine discharges known collectively as the Locust Gap Mine discharges. The creek also leaks water into underground mines. In three measurements between 1997 and 2000, the discharge of the stream ranged from 0 to 1.8 cubic feet per second (0.000 to 0.051 m^{3}/s). In March 2000, the water temperature of the stream was measured to be 10.0 °C (50.0 °F), while the specific conductance was 299 micro-siemens per centimeter at 25 °C (77 °F).

As of 1972, the pH of Locust Creek averages 3.6, but can be as low as 3.2. The concentration of acidity averaged 135 milligrams per liter (0.135 oz/cu ft), but could be as high as 216 milligrams per liter (0.216 oz/cu ft). The average iron concentration was on average 1.8 milligrams per liter (0.0018 oz/cu ft), but could be as high as 3.8 milligrams per liter (0.0038 oz/cu ft). The concentration of dissolved solids was high enough to cause sanitation problems. However, in March 2000, the concentration of suspended solids was less than 2 milligrams per liter (0.0020 oz/cu ft). The turbidity of the stream was 1.0 Nephelometric Turbidity Units. The water hardness was 74.5 milligrams per liter (0.0744 oz/cu ft).

In March 2000, the concentrations of recoverable sodium and potassium in Locust Creek were 8.6 and 1.9 milligrams per liter (0.0086 and 0.0019 oz/cu ft). The concentrations of recoverable magnesium and calcium were 9.5 and 14.2 milligrams per liter (0.0095 and 0.0142 oz/cu ft). The concentrations of recoverable manganese and iron were 880 and 460 micrograms per liter (0.00088 and 0.00046 oz/cu ft), while the recoverable aluminum concentration was 3,800 micrograms per liter (0.0038 oz/cu ft).

In March 2000, the concentration of dissolved oxygen in Locust Creek was 11 milligrams per liter (0.011 oz/cu ft), but no carbon dioxide was observed. The nitrogen concentration was 0.27 milligrams per liter (0.00027 oz/cu ft), while the phosphorus concentration was 0.030 milligrams per liter (3.0×10^{−5} oz/cu ft). The chloride and sulfate concentrations were 116 and 14.5 milligrams per liter (0.1159 and 0.0145 oz/cu ft). The ammonia concentration was less than 0.026 milligrams per liter (2.6×10^{−5} oz/cu ft) and the nitrate concentration was less than 0.031 milligrams per liter (3.1×10^{−5} oz/cu ft).

== Geography, geology, and watershed ==
The elevation near the mouth of Locust Creek is 1,010 feet (310 m) above sea level. The elevation of the stream's source is between 1,340 and 1,360 feet (408 and 415 m) above sea level.

There is a thick coating of iron precipitate on Locust Creek. Locust Gap is in the vicinity of the creek. The watershed is fairly flat, with many slopes being 25 percent or less. The creek cuts a water gap through Locust Mountain, revealing an anticlinal.

The watershed of Locust Creek has an area of 5.75 square miles (14.9 km^{2}). The stream is entirely within the United States Geological Survey quadrangle of Mount Carmel.

Much of the watershed of Locust Creek is occupied by refuse areas. However, the creek's watershed is mostly on forested land.

Explo-Tech Inc. has a permit to discharge some form of waste into Locust Creek.

== History and recreation ==
Locust Creek was entered into the Geographic Names Information System on August 2, 1979. Its identifier in the Geographic Names Information System is 1179768.

A bridge carrying Pennsylvania Route 901 crosses Locust Creek. This bridge has been slated for preservation as part of the state of Pennsylvania's "Decade of Investment". There are some trails in the vicinity of the creek's headwaters.

== Biology ==
The drainage basin of Locust Creek is designated as a Coldwater Fishery and a Migratory Fishery.

Species such as Juncus biflorus and Platanthera ciliaris could potentially inhabit the area near the headwaters of Locust Creek.

== See also ==
- Quaker Run, next tributary of Shamokin Creek going downstream
- North Branch Shamokin Creek, next tributary of Shamokin Creek going upstream
- List of rivers of Pennsylvania
- List of tributaries of Shamokin Creek
