= Little Shamokin Creek =

Creek in Central Pennsylvania

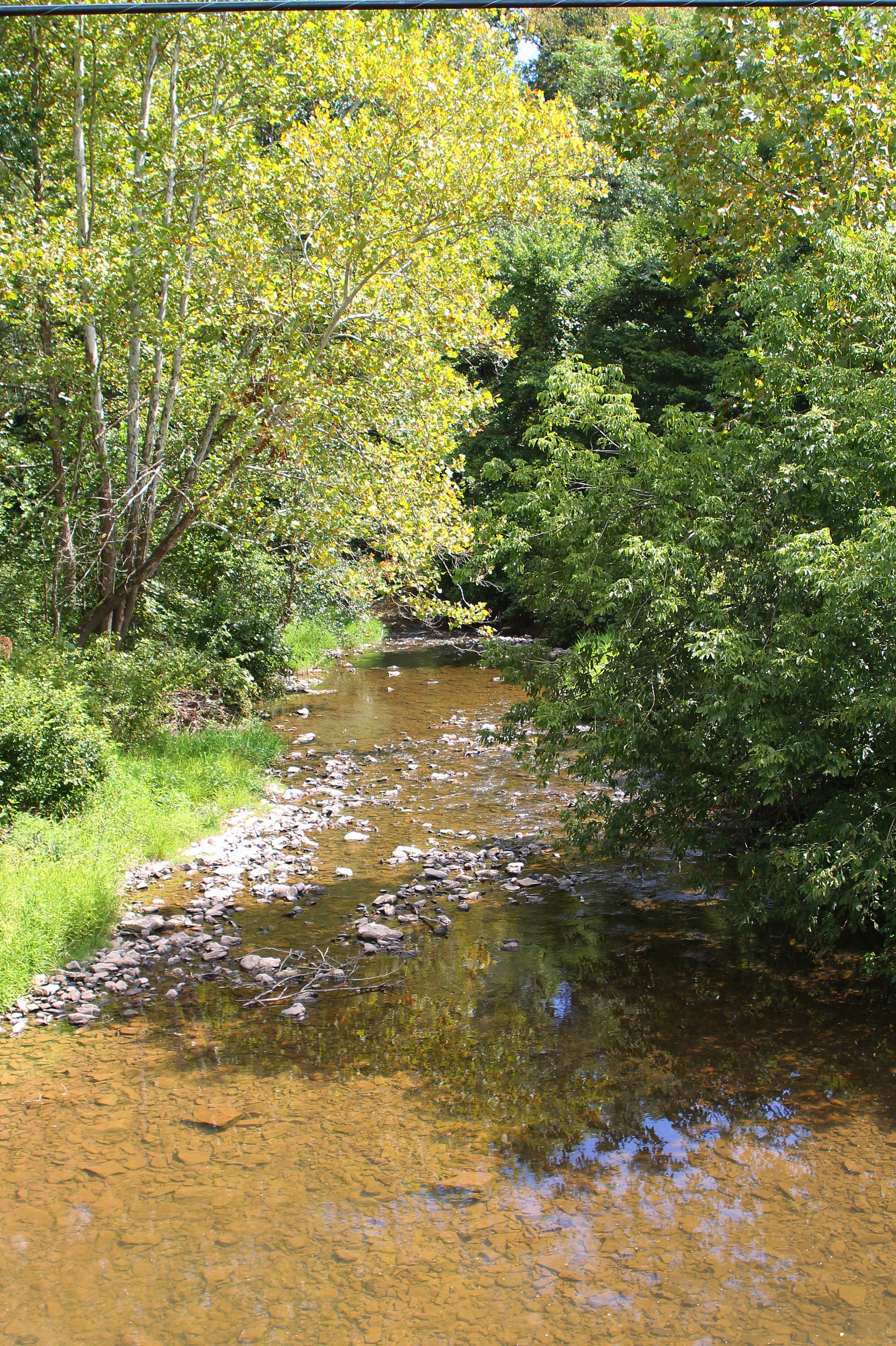
- Little Shamokin Creek

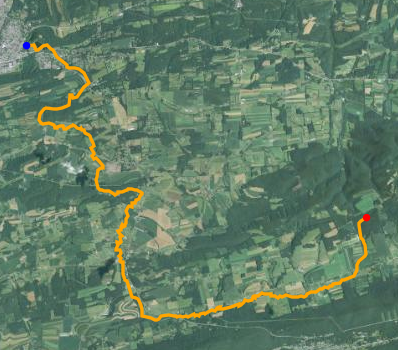
- Satellite map of Little Shamokin Creek. The red dot is the stream's source and blue dot is its mouth.

Physical characteristics
- Source
  - location: Irish Valley
- Mouth
  - location: Little Shamokin Creek near Sunbury
  - coordinates: 40°51′40″N 76°46′34″W
- Length: 15.0 mi (24.1 km)
- Basin size: 37 sq mi (96 km^{2})

Basin features
- River system: Susquehanna River
- Tributaries
  - right: Plum Creek

Little Shamokin Creek is a 15.0-mile-long (24.1 km) tributary of Shamokin Creek and a sub-tributary of the Susquehanna River in Northumberland County, Pennsylvania, in the United States. The watershed of the creek has an area of 37 square miles, spread out over Upper Augusta Township, Lower Augusta Township, Rockefeller Township, and Shamokin Township. The creek's watershed contains four rock formations. These are the Hamilton Group, the Spechty Kopf formation, the Irish Valley formation, and the Buddy Run formation. The watershed also contains three main soil types. They are the Berks-Weikert-Bedington series, the Leck Kill-Meckesville-Calvin series and the Hazelton-Dekalb-Buchanan series.

Little Shamokin Creek is the only stream in the Shamokin Creek watershed where fish can survive, as of 1999.

== Course ==
Little Shamokin Creek starts in eastern Northumberland County, several miles north of Trevorton. From its starting point, the creek flows west through the Irish Valley and eventually exits the valley. Upon reaching the Augustaville Church, it turns northwards. The creek continues northwards until it reaches its confluence with Shamokin Creek.

== Geology ==
Little Shamokin Creek is located in the ridge-and-valley Appalachian Mountains. The headwaters of the creek are located 960 feet (290 m) higher than the mouth. The highest portions of the watershed are in the southeastern area, where Little Mountain is located.

90% of the rocks in the upper portion of the Little Shamokin Creek watershed are interbedded sedimentary rocks. The other 10% are sandstone.

The main soil series in the Little Shamokin Creek watershed is the Berks-Weikert-Bedington series, which is a shaly silt loam found in the lower areas of the watershed. However, at least two other soil series exist in the watershed. They are the Leck Kill-Meckesville-Calvin series and the Hazelton-Dekalb-Buchanan series. The Berks-Weikert-Bedingon soil series occurs in all the northern and central areas of the watershed. The Leck Kill-Meckesville-Calvin series occurs in a band immediately south of the Berks-Weikert-Bedingon series in the watershed. The Hazelton-Dekalb-Buchanan occurs in an area in the extreme south of the watershed.

The Hamilton Group is a rock formation that exists in all of the northern portion of the Little Shamokin Creek watershed. Immediately south of this formation in the watershed is a band of the Spechty Kopf formation. South of the Spechty Kopf formation is a band of members of the Irish Valley formation. In the extreme southern area of the watershed is a band of members of the Buddy Run formation. A rock formation known as the Oriskany chert stops at Little Shamokin Creek. There is also Oriskany sandstone near the creek.

There is severe erosion on the banks of much of Little Shamokin Creek. The creek is also home to a fishing hole that is approximately 3 feet (0.91 m) deep. This is experiencing erosion as well.

== Hydrology ==
The waters of Little Shamokin Creek have low levels of dissolved oxygen. The average annual rainfall in the watershed is 44.5 inches (113 cm). There is an average of 0.23 inches (5.8 mm) of runoff in the watershed annually. The creek takes in 22,675.426 pounds of sediment per day and 12.663 pounds (5.744 kg) per day of phosphorus.

As of 1913, the Sunbury Water Company, which provides water to Sunbury, got its water from Little Shamokin Creek. A dam with five reservoirs was created on the creek, 1 mile (1.6 km) east of Sunbury. Reservoir Number 1's capacity was 2,750,000 gallons. Reservoir Number 2's capacity was 2,180,000 gallons. It was located on the east bank of the creek. Reservoir Number 3's capacity was 1,900,000 gallons. It was also located on the east bank of the creek. Reservoir Number 4's capacity was 16,510,000 gallons. It was located on the east bank of the creek. Reservoir Number 5's capacity was 26,670,000 gallons. It was located on the east bank of the creek.

== Watershed ==
The watershed of little Shamokin Creek has an area of 37 square miles. 65% of the watershed is made up of forests. These include tree farms and groups of deciduous trees. 30% of the watershed is agricultural land. 2% of the watershed is urban or developed land in general.

Pennsylvania Route 890 is a major route in the Little Shamokin Creek watershed. The creek and its tributaries are also accessible via a number of township roads.

== History ==
A number of watermills have been built on Little Shamokin Creek and its tributaries. Miller's Mill was one such mill. It was first built by Colonel Thomas Jones during the 1790s, between Tulpehocken Road and Trevorton. Another mill was built in the same location in 1850. Shipman's Mill was also located on the creek, between Tulpehocken Road and the Susquehanna River. This mill was built by Abraham Shipman in 1850. Fagley's Mill was built in southern Rockefeller Township, on a tributary of the creek. It was constructed in 1856 by Samuel Lantz.

The first public road in the valley of Little Shamokin Creek was built in 1787.

== Tributaries ==
Plum Creek is one named tributary of Little Shamokin Creek. There are no other named tributaries of the creek, although there are several unnamed ones.

== Fauna and flora ==
In some of the agricultural areas of the Little Shamokin Creek watershed, there is very little riparian buffer. Livestock also have easy access to the creek in some areas. There are beef and pork farms located near the creek. The farms contribute to the stream's rating by the Department of Environmental Protection as "impaired". Water-penny beetles have also been observed in the creek, indicating that it is recovering from being biologically impaired. However, there is siltation in the creek, which damages the food chain there. Little Shamokin Creek is part of a trout fishery that also contains South Branch Roaring Creek, Mahantango Creek, and other streams.

== Recreation ==
An area of 25.5 acres on the side of Little Shamokin Creek in Rockefeller Township was converted to a recreational area by the Little Shamokin Creek Watershed Association. This was also the first public recreational area in the township. As of August 20, 2012, the recreational area was almost complete.

== See also ==
- Lick Creek (Shamokin Creek), next tributary of Shamokin Creek going upstream
- List of rivers in Pennsylvania
- List of tributaries of Shamokin Creek
