= Plum Creek (Little Shamokin Creek tributary) =

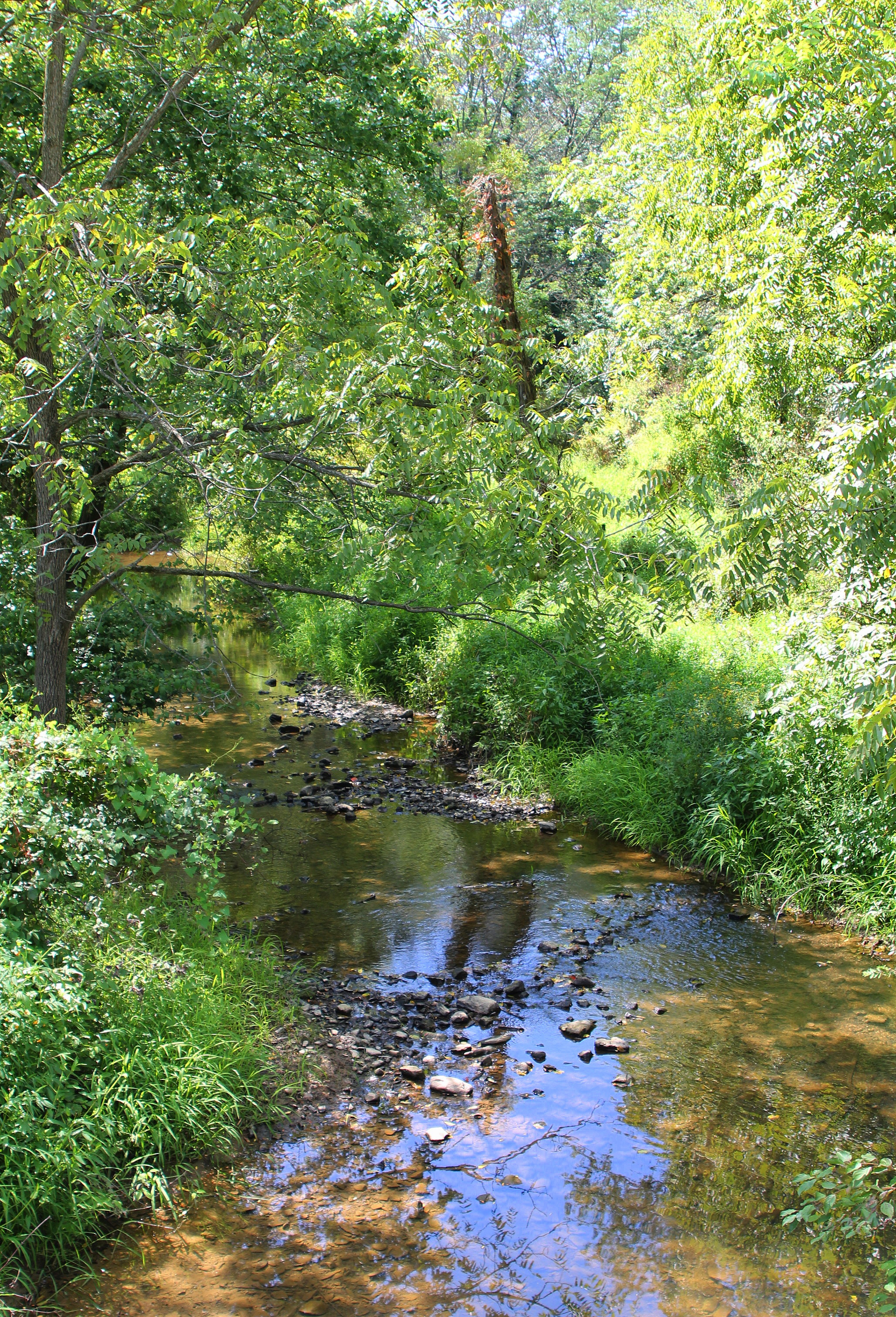
- Plum Creek looking downstream

Physical characteristics
- Source
  - location: small pond in Shamokin Township, Pennsylvania
  - elevation: between 680 and 700 feet (207 and 213 m)
- Mouth
  - location: Little Shamokin Creek in Rockefeller Township, Pennsylvania
  - coordinates: 40°51′04″N 76°45′17″W
  - elevation: 495 ft (151 m)
- Length: 4.7 mi (7.6 km)
- Basin size: 10.2 sq mi (26 km^{2})

Basin features
- Progression: Little Shamokin Creek → Shamokin Creek → Susquehanna River → Chesapeake Bay
- Tributaries
  - left: one unnamed tributary
  - right: three unnamed tributaries

Plum Creek is a tributary of Little Shamokin Creek in Northumberland County, Pennsylvania, in the United States. It is approximately 4.7 miles (7.6 km) long and flows through Shamokin Township and Rockefeller Township. The watershed of the creek has an area of 10.2 square miles (26 km^{2}). It is a small, perennial stream and its valley was substantially colonized by the early 19th century. A number of bridges have been constructed over the creek.

== Course ==
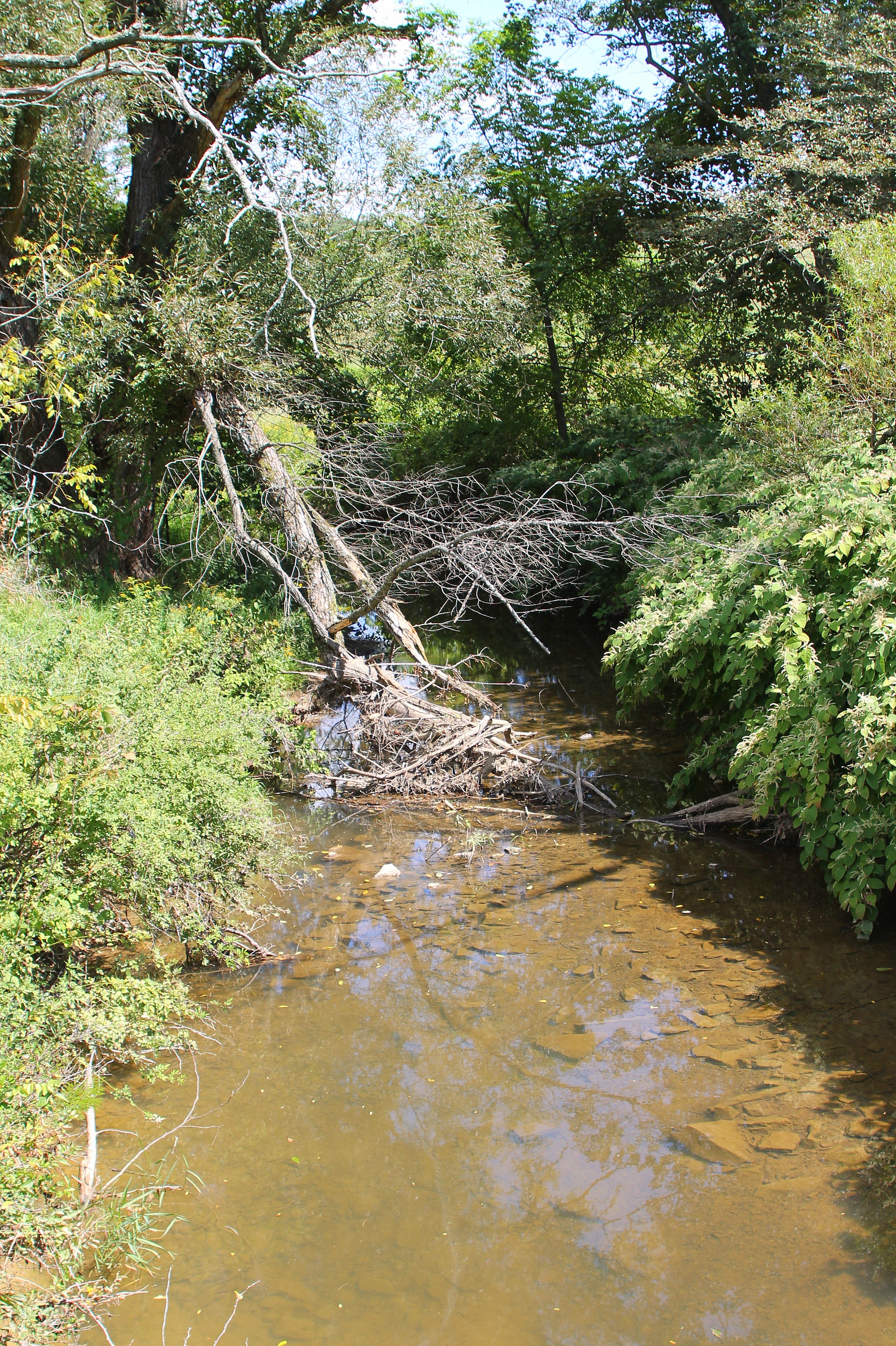
Plum Creek looking upstream from QR 4016

Plum Creek begins in a small pond in Shamokin Township. It flows northwest for several tenths of a mile before turning west. The creek then enters Rockefeller Township and turns west-southwest for more than a mile. The creek then turns west-northwest for several tenths of a mile receives two unnamed tributaries—one from the left and one from the right—and turns west-southwest for several hundred feet before turning north for a few tenths of a mile. At this point, it turns west for several tenths of a mile and receives two unnamed tributaries from the right before turning northwest. Several hundred feet further downstream, the creek reaches its confluence with Little Shamokin Creek.

Plum Creek joins Little Shamokin Creek 1.52 miles (2.45 km) upstream of its mouth.

== Hydrology ==
A total of 4 miles (6.4 km) of Plum Creek plus all of its unnamed tributaries are designated as impaired. The impairment comes from siltation, organic enrichment, and low levels of dissolved oxygen and are due to grazing; the remaining 0.7 miles (1.1 km) of the main stem are not designated as impaired.

== Geography, geology, and watershed ==
The elevation near the mouth of Plum Creek is 495 feet (151 m) above sea level. The elevation of the creek's source is between 680 and 700 feet (207 and 213 m) above sea level.

Plum Creek is a small, perennial stream.

The watershed of Plum Creek has an area of 10.2 square miles (26 km^{2}). The mouth of the creek is in the United States Geological Survey quadrangle of Sunbury. However, its source is in the quadrangle of Trevorton.

The headwaters of Plum Creek are 0.4 miles (0.64 km) south of Millers Crossroads Church. The creek's mouth is near Pennsylvania Route 890.

Plum Creek has been used as a water supply for Sunbury. There are some reservoirs in the creek's watershed.

== History ==
Plum Creek was entered into the Geographic Names Information System on August 2, 1979. Its identifier in the Geographic Names Information System is 1184112.

By the early 1800s, the valley of Plum Creek had some inhabitants and was one of the major points of colonization in the area, aside from Sunbury. Many Lutherans had colonized the area during this period. Plum Creek Road historically ran through the creek's valley and connected Tulpehocken Road (now Pennsylvania Route 890) with Old King's Highway (now Pennsylvania Route 61) and aided travel between Sunbury and Shamokin.

The Eden Evangelical Lutheran Church was founded by inhabitants of the valley of Plum Creek in 1844, as there was no other church within several miles.

Agriculture was also being done in the valley of Plum Creek by the early 1800s. For instance, Henry Yoxtheimer, Sr., an early pioneer, farmed in the valley. Also, the 58-acre William Miller homestead historically existed at the headwaters of the creek. Parts of this valley were "fertile" and "well-cultivated" in the 19th and 20th centuries.

A number of bridges have been built over Plum Creek, including four in 1939 alone. A concrete tee beam bridge carrying Peace Valley Road was built across the creek in 1920 1 mile (1.6 km) southeast of Hamilton and is 44.0 feet (13.4 m) long. A steel stringer/multi-beam or girder bridge carrying State Route 4016 was built over the creek in 1939 north of Seven Points and is 51.8 feet (15.8 m) long. Another bridge of the same type was built over the creek in that year 1.5 miles (2.4 km) southeast of Hamilton. This bridge, which was repaired in 1999, is 51.8 feet (15.8 m) long and also carries State Route 4016. A concrete slab bridge carrying State Route 4013 over Plum Creek was built in 1939 and repaired in 1997. It is 23.0 feet (7.0 m) long and is located 1.5 miles (2.4 km) southwest of Stonington. Another bridge of the same type was built over the creek 3 miles (4.8 km) southwest of Stonington in 1939 and repaired in 1994. This bridge carries State Route 4013 and is 22.0 feet (6.7 m) long. A prestressed box beam or girders bridge with a length of 40.0 feet (12.2 m) was constructed across the creek 1.5 miles (2.4 km) northwest of Seven Points in 1989 and carries T-684.

The name "Plum Creek" was erroneously given to another stream in the stream system of Little Shamokin Creek in a 1952 United States Geological Map of the Shamokin quadrangle. This error was noted in the late 1960s and was verified by two local farmers.

== See also ==
- List of rivers of Pennsylvania
