= Strong, Pennsylvania =

Census-designated place in Pennsylvania, US

- Census-designated place
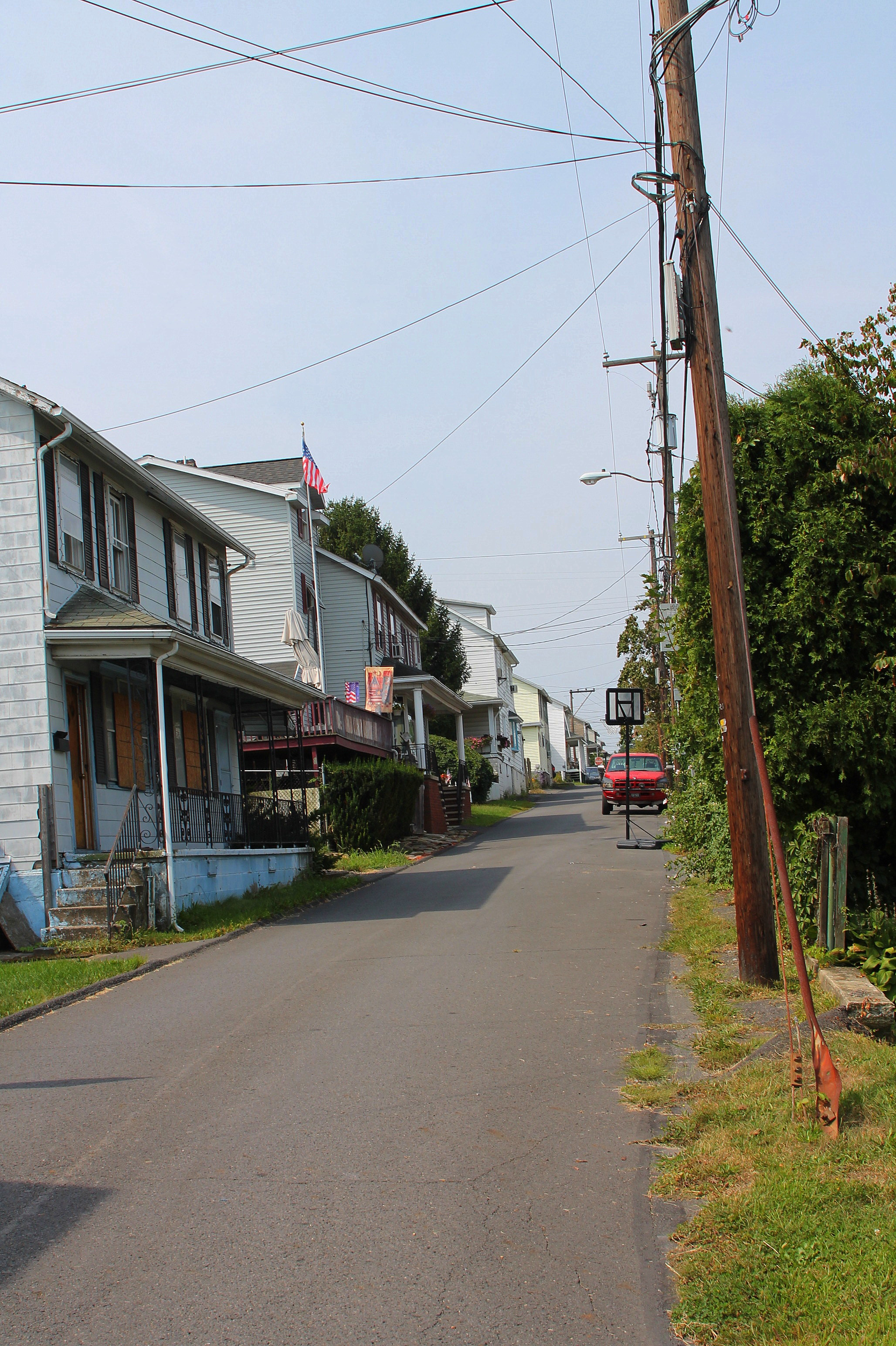
- Strong in 2015

- Location within Pennsylvania
- Coordinates: 40°47′55″N 76°26′17″W
- Country: United States
- State: Pennsylvania
- County: Northumberland
- Township: Mount Carmel

Area
  - Total: 0.04 sq mi (0.10 km^{2})
  - Land: 0.04 sq mi (0.10 km^{2})
  - Water: 0 sq mi (0 km^{2})
- Elevation: 1,060 ft (323 m)

Population (2010)
  - Total: 147
  - Density: 3,700/sq mi (1,400/km^{2})
- ZIP code: 17851
- Area code: 570
- FIPS code: 42-74832

Strong is a census-designated place (CDP) in Mount Carmel Township, Pennsylvania, United States. It is situated on Pennsylvania Route 54 and Pennsylvania Route 61. Its ZIP code is 17851.

== Geography ==
Strong is one of several unincorporated communities within Mount Carmel Township, alongside Atlas, Beaverdale, Connorsville, Locust Gap, Natalie, and Reliance. The community covers a total area of 0.04 square miles, all of it land, with no water area.

== History ==
In 1951, Strong was incorporated into a consolidated school district when Mount Carmel Township joined with the borough of Mount Carmel, adding Strong and the communities of Atlas, Centralia, Locust Gap, and Natalie to the district. In 1963, the district expanded through a jointure with neighboring Kulpmont and was renamed the Mount Carmel Area School District.

== Demographics ==
At the 2010 Census, Strong had a population of 147.

== Education ==
It is in the Mount Carmel Area School District.
