= Reliance Colliery =

Colliery in Mount Carmel Township, Pennsylvania

- Reliance Colliery coal breaker, operated by Thos. Baumgardner & Co., 19th-century engraving.
- Location: Mount Carmel Township, Northumberland County, Pennsylvania

History
- Built: 1867
- Demolished: mid-20th century

Site notes
- Owner: Thos. Baumgardner & Co. (1867–c.1890s); Philadelphia and Reading Coal and Iron Company (by 1902–1956); Reading Anthracite Company (1956–c.1960s)

The Reliance Colliery was an anthracite mining facility in Mount Carmel Township, Northumberland County, Pennsylvania, within the Western Middle Anthracite Field. Thos. Baumgardner & Co., under the presidency of Thomas Baumgardner, built the colliery and shipped its first coal in January 1867. It later passed to the Philadelphia and Reading Coal and Iron Company (P.&R. C.&I.), which folded it into its broader network of mines around Mount Carmel and eventually used it to feed raw coal into the company's centralized Locust Summit breaker. The strip-mining operation that eventually took the colliery's place, known as the Reliance Pit, was directly responsible for the demolition of the neighboring village of Alaska beginning in 1958.

== History ==
Thomas Baumgardner served as president of Thos. Baumgardner & Co., which built the colliery, with E.R. Cooke as general superintendent. The company sank its shaft in Mount Carmel Township on Locust Mountain, south of the borough, and the first coal shipped on January 16, 1867, from a breaker built to hold between 1,600 and 1,800 tons and process 90 to 100 cars a day — a substantial operation for its time in the Western Middle Anthracite Field.

The colliery's early independence did not last. The Philadelphia and Reading Coal and Iron Company was organized in 1871 by Franklin B. Gowen to bring the Philadelphia and Reading Railroad's coal holdings under one roof, and the company bought up more than half the Western Middle Field's coal lands in the years that followed its founding. One local history places the Reliance purchase specifically "around the turn of the century," though newspaper coverage confirms the colliery was already under P.&R. C.&I. control by 1902, when the company moved to protect the property during that year's statewide coal strike — so the acquisition likely fell somewhere in the three decades between the colliery's 1867 founding and its documented P.&R. C.&I. ownership at the turn of the century.

By 1896 Reliance was shipping 134,216 tons of coal a year and employing 436 men, figures that placed it among the more substantial collieries in the Mount Carmel district by the close of the 19th century. By 1902 the colliery was unambiguously a Philadelphia and Reading Coal and Iron Company property, as newspaper coverage of that year's strike makes clear.

== Labor and safety ==
In May 1871 the Northumberland County Democrat, reprinting a report from the Shamokin Herald, noted that the colliery was idle. The Mt. Carmel district of the Workingmen's Benevolent Association had proposed that miners at the Stuartville and Coal Ridge collieries take on a third man each to find work for the idled Reliance men, but the plan never went through — the men preferred to pay a $5 assessment instead. The report described the region as quiet, with operators and miners on good terms, and put the county's coal shipments at 78,259 tons for April and 230,542 tons for the season, up from 65,832 and 207,905 tons in the same stretch the year before.

During the Anthracite Coal Strike of 1902, the owners — called "the Reading people" in local reporting — arranged armed protection for the colliery amid fears it might come under attack. A single deputy guarded the property at first; a "car-load of deputies and other workmen" soon followed, settling into new quarters built for them at the site.

On the morning of September 2, 1926, between 9:30 and 10:00 a.m., a gas explosion tore through the Beaverdale Shaft. It began when a sudden rush of coal in Breast No. 2½ of the Buck Mountain gangway, No. 2 vein, south dip, swept two miners, John Owens and Marshall Smith, off their feet and down a chute, partially burying them. The falling coal pushed a large body of gas ahead of it into the gaseous west side of the section, where it ignited. Eight men were hurt, five of them seriously — Peter Aranick, Michael Rice, Stephen Homiak, John Boriak, and Lawrence Fracalossi were hospitalized with severe burns, while Alex Pollock, John Owens, and Marshall Smith got off with lighter injuries. A company investigation later traced the blast to a violation of state mine law: officials found a part-package of cigarettes and matches near the site, suggesting a miner had been smoking in a gaseous section. Three of the injured men did not survive: Lawrence Fracalossi died the night of the explosion; Michael Rice, 39, a Lithuanian-born miner who had worked in anthracite since boyhood, left behind a widow and two sons; and Stephen Homiak, 29, a World War I veteran, had been married only three weeks when he died.

Nearly a decade later, on October 31, 1935, two more miners — Peter Bernatovich, 41, and Bruno Bressi, 33, both of Mount Carmel — were burned in a dynamite explosion at the colliery. Neither was seriously hurt, and both were treated at Ashland State Hospital.

By April 1940, safety had become something worth bragging about. The Mount Carmel Item published accident figures for several local collieries that month: over a 16-day stretch, Reliance's 685-man workforce logged 79,583 man-hours with six lost-time accidents, costing 62 man-days. For March 1940 the colliery averaged 1,895 man-days worked per lost-time accident — well behind the Alaska Colliery's 4,645, but ahead of Potts Colliery's 1,541 and Locust Gap's 1,137. Two sections stood out: Section 21, all-outside work with 76 men, had gone 1 year and 7 months (218,000 man-hours) without a lost-time accident, and Section 16, with 30 men, had gone 2 years and 3 months (135,900 man-hours).

== Geology ==
Reliance worked several seams of the Western Middle Anthracite Field, including the Buck Mountain vein, which was being mined at the Beaverdale Shaft's No. 2 vein, south dip, at the time of the 1926 explosion. Like its neighbors around Mount Carmel, the colliery's workings ran into the steeply folded and faulted rock typical of the Western Middle Field's synclinal basin — terrain that forced operators across the district to chase coal through badly contorted strata, often down deep vertical shafts, just to reach workable reserves. That same geology made the field's anthracite — among the hardest, highest-carbon coal mined anywhere in the country — unusually prone to pooling methane, or "firedamp," in unventilated gangways and breasts, a hazard the 1926 explosion made plain.

== Role in the Locust Summit Central Breaker ==
Starting with the first shipment on March 31, 1930, Reliance became one of four collieries — alongside Alaska, Locust Gap, and Potts — feeding raw coal into the P.&R. C.&I.'s newly built Locust Summit Central Breaker, about two miles southwest of the Reliance workings. The breaker was the centerpiece of a company-wide overhaul adopted in 1929: instead of running 32 separate, aging colliery breakers, the company would consolidate processing into six large centralized plants. Under the new arrangement, a "cleaner plant" at Reliance took raw coal straight from the mine and scalped out the largest waste rock before sending the coal on to Locust Summit for final preparation. Water pumped up from Reliance's underground workings also made its way to a treatment plant at the colliery, where it served as make-up water for the breaker.

== Decline and closure ==
By 1950 the colliery still employed more than 400 men, but local papers were already reporting that Reliance, like the neighboring Alaska Colliery, faced closure as the readily accessible coal ran out. As late as 1949 the Philadelphia and Reading Coal and Iron Company was still running nine collieries in the region, but by 1954 the company had posted a net loss of $7,324,000 as demand for anthracite kept falling. With the United Mine Workers' sign-off, the Locust Summit Central Breaker and the mines feeding it, Reliance among them, were put on standby in January 1955 — a move that cost roughly 1,700 jobs. The operation never really recovered, and the company shut Locust Summit down for good in 1958 as sales and income kept slipping.

== Reliance Pit and demolition of Alaska ==
Once deep mining ended, the Reading Anthracite Company — spun off as a subsidiary of the Philadelphia and Reading Coal and Iron Corporation on January 1, 1956, under president Howard A. Newman — turned the site over to surface strip mining. The resulting open pit became known locally as the Reliance Pit. When the pit expanded in June 1958, it swallowed up what was left of Alaska, a patch town of roughly 40 residents whose homes dated back more than a century; company housing like this was routinely torn down because it sat directly on coal that strip operations could reach far more cheaply than any deep mine could. By the mid-1960s, nothing remained of Alaska's residential streets — the whole area had been cleared to make way for the expanding strip operations.

== Current status ==
The site is still being worked today, though not as a mine in the traditional sense. Surface operations now run under the name "Reliance Bank" — a nod to the culm bank material being reprocessed there rather than to the original deep workings. What's being recovered is anthracite left behind by generations of earlier mining, a practice that's become common across the old Western Middle Field now that processing technology can profitably reclaim coal once considered waste. The operation is registered with the U.S. Mine Safety and Health Administration under Mine ID 3608533 and run by the Gilberton Coal Company, part of the Rich family of companies based in Gilberton, Pennsylvania.

== See also ==
- Alaska Colliery
- Alaska, Northumberland County, Pennsylvania
- Scott Colliery
- Sayre Colliery
- Western Middle Anthracite Field
- Franklin B. Gowen
