= Sayre Colliery =

Anthracite colliery in Mount Carmel Township, Pennsylvania

- Interactive map of Sayre Colliery
- 40.803517°N 76.40203°W
- Type: Anthracite colliery
- Location: Mount Carmel Township, Northumberland County, Pennsylvania

History
- Built: c. 1904–1905

Site notes
- Owner: Lehigh Valley Coal Company

The Sayre Colliery was an anthracite mining facility located in Mount Carmel Township, Northumberland County, Pennsylvania, within the Western Middle Anthracite Field. Operated by the Lehigh Valley Coal Company, a subsidiary of the Lehigh Valley Railroad, it was named in honor of Robert H. Sayre, who served as vice president and chief engineer of the Lehigh Valley Railroad. The colliery extracted coal from the Mammoth Vein via a deep vertical shaft sunk north of the earlier Mount Carmel Colliery workings. Deep mining operations continued until approximately 1930, when the Lehigh Valley Coal Company ceased operations across its Western Middle Field properties amid declining coal prices during the Great Depression.

== Namesake ==
The colliery was named after Robert Heysham Sayre (October 13, 1824 – January 4, 1907), one of the most prominent figures in Pennsylvania's industrial history. Sayre served as chief engineer of the Lehigh Valley Railroad beginning in 1854 and later as its vice president and general superintendent until his retirement in 1898. He was also a co-founder of the Bethlehem Iron Company, the corporate predecessor to Bethlehem Steel, and a charter trustee of Lehigh University. Sayre served as a director of the Valley Coal and Coke Company and president of the Sayre Mining and Manufacturing Company, reflecting his sustained involvement in the coal industry throughout his career. The borough of Sayre, Pennsylvania was also named in his honor.

== History ==
=== Establishment (c. 1904–1905) ===
The Sayre Colliery was developed by the Lehigh Valley Coal Company on land in Mount Carmel Township in the early 1900s to succeed the neighboring Mount Carmel (Stuartville) Colliery, which had been operating since 1858. Thomas Righter and Company had been the final operator of the older colliery under lease from the Locust Mountain Coal and Iron Company. In 1905, the Mount Carmel Colliery was abandoned in favor of the newly developed Sayre Colliery, which had sunk a large vertical shaft to the north of the older workings, providing access to previously unreached sections of the Mammoth Vein. The total shipments from the older Mount Carmel Colliery over its working life had amounted to 3,771,379 tons.

=== Peak operations ===
At its operational peak, the Sayre Colliery was one of the Lehigh Valley Coal Company's principal properties in the Western Middle Anthracite Field. Vintage picture postcards document the surface plant as it appeared in 1907 and 1912, showing the colliery's surface structures. Geological survey data from the Lehigh Valley Coal Company's operations at the colliery was later incorporated into the U.S. Geological Survey's comprehensive study of the Mount Carmel quadrangle.

The colliery was served by the Lehigh Valley Railroad, which transported the anthracite output to eastern markets.

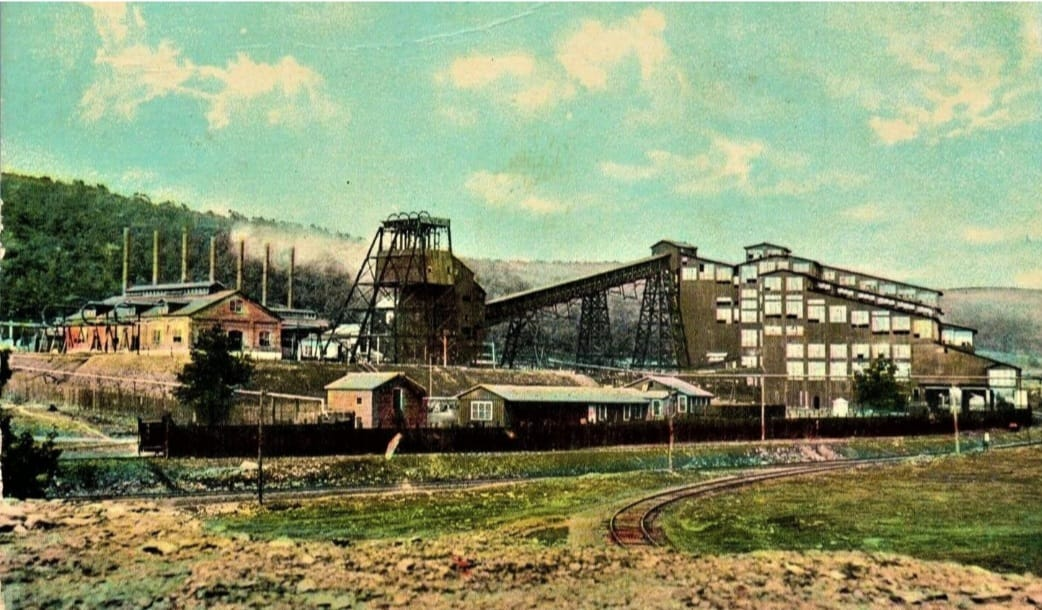
Sayre Colliery surface plant

=== Labor relations ===
The Sayre Colliery was established in the aftermath of a period of intense labor unrest across the anthracite region. The Anthracite Coal Strike of 1902 had shut down operations across all four Pennsylvania anthracite fields for nearly five months. President Theodore Roosevelt intervened, becoming the first U.S. president to act as a neutral arbitrator in a labor dispute, ultimately forcing both sides into binding arbitration before the Anthracite Coal Strike Commission.

=== Decline and closure (1930s) ===
The Lehigh Valley Coal Company closed its deep mining operations across the Western Middle Field around 1930, consistent with the broader contraction of the anthracite industry during the Great Depression. The company's other nearby operations, including the Vulcan Colliery in the Mahanoy Valley, were also closed in the early 1930s. High fixed operating costs — particularly the mechanical pumping required to drain deep underground workings — combined with falling coal prices during the Depression made continued deep mining increasingly uneconomical.

== Post-closure and current status ==
Following the closure of deep mining operations, the Sayre Colliery property passed through several private owners. In the 1960s, the former Sayre property near Mount Carmel was acquired by local businessmen Robert Kerris Sr. and Ed Helfrick, who continued surface strip mining operations on the site. Kerris and Helfrick were also involved in projects to extinguish mine fires in the area, including at the east end of Mount Carmel and in Kulpmont.

Parts of the former colliery land were subsequently developed into the Den-Mar Gardens residential community, as well as commercial properties including Northwestern Academy, a Walmart, and a Reinhart Foodservice distribution center along Pennsylvania Route 61 in Mount Carmel Township.

As of 2023, active surface mining continues on the remaining portions of the former colliery property under the Pennsylvania DEP permit designation "Mallard Contracting Sayre Mine" (Permit No. 49663009), operated by Mallard Contracting Co. Inc. of Mount Carmel.

== See also ==
- Alaska Colliery
- Scott Colliery
- Reliance Colliery
