= Lower Anthracite Transportation System =

- Parent: Borough of Mount Carmel, PA
- Founded: 1982
- Service area: Northumberland County, PA
- Service type: Bus
- Routes: 3 (regular); 1 (seasonal)
- Hubs: Coal Township, PA
- Operator: Catawese Coach Lines
- Website: https://www.loweranthracitetransit.com/

The Lower Anthracite Transportation System (LATS) is a small transportation system serving Mount Carmel, Pennsylvania and the surrounding area, primarily of Northumberland County.

== Routes ==
The LATS route system, based out of Mount Carmel, operates two routes that meet at Coal Township Plaza, weekdays and Saturdays, serving outlying communities of Mount Carmel, Atlas, Natalie, Marion Heights, Kulpmont, Walmart, Locust Gap and Ashland on Route 1; and Shamokin township on Route 2. Route 3, opened in 2025, runs from Coal Township Plaza to various points in Sunbury and Shamokin Dam. A fourth route, operated seasonally, serves Knoebel's Amusement Resort in neighboring Elysburg. The three regular routes run in a loop.

== Fare ==
LATS implemented an adult base fare that is paid upon boarding the bus. Children pay a discounted fare compared to adults. Seniors are exempt from a fare, those fares being subsidized by the Pennsylvania State Lottery.

== Operations ==
The borough of Mount Carmel manages LATS service through a contracted service provider, Catawese Coach Lines, a contract that has been in place since early in 2013. The previous contract was with King Coal Tours, an operator that had been in place for over thirty years.

== Connections to other agencies ==
LATS buses connect to Schuylkill Transportation System buses at Ashland.
