= Alaska, Northumberland County, Pennsylvania =

Alaska
- Former coal patch town
- Interactive map of Alaska
- Coordinates: 40°47′01″N 076°26′15″W
- Country: United States
- State: Pennsylvania
- County: Northumberland
- Township: Mount Carmel Township
- Founded: 1874
- Disestablished: mid-20th century
- Former operator: Philadelphia and Reading Coal and Iron Company; Reading Anthracite Company

Alaska was a former patch town in Mount Carmel Township, Northumberland County, Pennsylvania, United States. Located approximately two miles southwest of Mount Carmel, the community developed around the Alaska Colliery, a deep anthracite mine established by the Philadelphia and Reading Coal and Iron Company in 1874. The village was also known as Mount Carmel Junction, reflecting its role as a railroad connection point on the Reading Railroad's Mt. Carmel Branch. At its peak the colliery employed 777 workers and produced approximately 300,000 tons of coal annually. The community was razed by the Reading Anthracite Company beginning in 1958 to permit surface strip mining operations, and by the mid-1960s the village had been entirely cleared.

== History ==
In 1874, the Philadelphia and Reading Coal and Iron Company (P.&R. C.&I.) sank a deep mine shaft and constructed a breaker at the site, establishing a colliery and the surrounding patch community. Early in construction, the engine, boiler, and shaft houses of the Alaska shaft were destroyed by a fire on March 15, 1874.

The village that grew up around the colliery was home to mining families whose livelihoods depended on the P.&R. C.&I. operation. On June 5, 1886, a fire destroyed the Alaska breaker along with the adjoining saw-mill. At the time of the fire, the breaker was processing approximately 25,000 tons of coal per month, with 500 workers employed and a monthly payroll of $20,000, reflecting the scale of the community's economic dependence on the colliery. By 1920, the workforce had grown to 777 workers, with the colliery producing approximately 300,000 tons of coal that year.

== Notable visitors ==
In November 1902, Annie Oakley and members of her traveling company visited the underground workings of the Alaska Colliery. It was her first experience of anthracite mining, and she subsequently expressed sympathy with the miners' desire for better pay and increased safeguards for those working underground. The party also toured the Alaska breaker, where they observed boys at work along the coal chutes.

== Recreation ==
In the summer of 1927, Alaska fielded a team in the local Recreational Baseball League, a competition that also included teams representing the nearby collieries of Locust Gap, Sayre, Scott, Natalie, Richards, Pennsylvania, and Reliance. The Alaska and Locust Gap colliery teams entered the league together, with Fleming serving as the Alaska team's representative.

On July 29, 1927, the Alaska team defeated Sayre 4–1 at Mount Carmel Park. Pitcher Tuffki Andrulevich allowed four hits and one run while striking out ten batters, and centerfielder Benson hit a home run over the left field wall with a runner on base. Later in the season, Alaska and Natalie played to a 2–2 tie at Mount Carmel Park, with Alaska twice stranding three runners on base with none out.

== Transportation ==
Alaska Station, also known as Mount Carmel Junction.

Alaska served as an important railroad junction point in the Mount Carmel area. A depot intended for the use of miners was erected at Alaska in 1899, described at the time as a little small but sufficient to afford shelter from cold weather. The station was situated on the curve of the Philadelphia and Reading Railway's main line, a position that created significant inconvenience and danger for passengers. The local Pewee train did not pull in on the track nearest the station, forcing passengers awaiting connecting trains to stand in the open while long strings of coal cars passed slowly on the inner tracks. Interlocking switches and multiple tracks created further hazard, and a passenger alighting from a main line train risked being detained by passing coal cars long enough to miss the local service entirely.

By 1907 the Philadelphia & Reading Railway was contemplating erection of a new modern station several hundred yards west of the existing depot, on straight track where the danger of the curve would be eliminated. In August 1909, Theodore Voorhees, Vice President of the Philadelphia & Reading Railway, wrote to Daniel D. Bolich, President of the Mount Carmel Board of Trade, confirming that construction of the new station would proceed, with costs estimated at between $7,000 and $8,000 and work scheduled to begin by September 15 of that year. The new station was thereafter known as Mount Carmel Junction.

== Decline and demolition ==
Deep mining at the Alaska Colliery became increasingly unprofitable during the 1930s due to the high cost of pumping water from underground workings. Deep mining operations ended on April 30, 1944, with the operating company citing the "prohibitive cost of dewatering" the deep slopes.

In 1956, the Reading Anthracite Company converted the site to surface strip mining operations, which required the complete removal of surface structures to access shallow coal seams. The village of Alaska at that time was home to approximately 40 residents, and its houses dated back over a century. In June 1958, with equipment already moved onto the site to begin demolition, most of the remaining families relocated elsewhere ahead of the advancing strip mining operation. By the mid-1960s, the residential area had been entirely cleared.

== See also ==
- Alaska Colliery
- Kulpmont, Pennsylvania
- Locust Gap, Pennsylvania
- Mount Carmel, Pennsylvania
- Reading Anthracite Company
- Philadelphia and Reading Coal and Iron Company
