= List of public transit authorities in Pennsylvania =

This is a list of public transport authorities in Pennsylvania.

Public Transit Authority	City	External link
Transportation Management Association of Chester County	West Chester, Pennsylvania	https://tmacc.org/
Pottstown Area Rapid Transit	Pottstown, Pennsylvania	http://pottstownarearapidtransit.com/
Red Rose Transit Authority	Lancaster, Pennsylvania	http://www.redrosetransit.com/
Westmoreland County Transit Authority	Greensburg, Pennsylvania	https://www.westmorelandtransit.com/
Berks Area Regional Transportation Authority	Reading, Pennsylvania	http://www.bartabus.com
Mid County Transit Authority	Kittanning, Pennsylvania	https://www.tandctransit.com/
Beaver County Transit Authority	Rochester, Pennsylvania	http://www.bcta.com
Centre Area Transportation Authority	State College, Pennsylvania	http://www.catabus.com
Indiana County Transit Authority	Indiana, Pennsylvania	https://www.indigobus.com
LANta	Allentown, Pennsylvania	http://www.lantabus.com
Perry County Transportation Authority	Newport, Pennsylvania	
North Central Pennsylvania Area Transportation Authority	Johnsonburg, Pennsylvania	http://www.rideata.com
Monroe County Transportation Authority	Scotrun, Pennsylvania	
Moon Transportation Authority	Coraopolis, Pennsylvania	
Freedom Transit	Washington, Pennsylvania	https://www.freedom-transit.org
BeST Transit	Athens, Pennsylvania	http://www.gobesttransit.com
Upper Merion Transportation Authority	King of Prussia, Pennsylvania	
Adams County Transit Authority	Gettysburg, Pennsylvania	
Allegheny County Port Authority	Pittsburgh, Pennsylvania	https://www.rideprt.org/
Dubois Falls Creek Sandy Township Joint Transportation Authority	Dubois, Pennsylvania	
Erie Metropolitan Transit Authority	Erie, Pennsylvania	http://www.emtaerie.com
County of Lackawanna Transit System	Scranton, Pennsylvania	http://coltsbus.com
Luzerne County Transportation Authority	Kingston, Pennsylvania	http://www.lctabus.com
SEPTA	Philadelphia, Pennsylvania	http://www.septa.org
Capital Area Transit	Harrisburg, Pennsylvania	http://www.cattransit.com
New Castle Area Transit Authority	New Castle, Pennsylvania	
Susquehanna Regional Transportation Authority	York, Pennsylvania	http://www.rabbittransit.org/
Altoona Metro Transit	Altoona, Pennsylvania	http://www.amtran.org
Kutztown Transportation Authority	Kutztown, Pennsylvania	
Warren County Transit Authority	Warren, Pennsylvania	
Cambria County Transit Authority	Johnstown, Pennsylvania	https://www.camtranbus.com
Mid Mon Valley Transit Authority	Charleroi, Pennsylvania	
Crawford Area Transportation Authority	Meadville, Pennsylvania	
Frazer Transportation Authority	Tarentum, Pennsylvania	
Butler Transit Authority	Butler, Pennsylvania	
Lebanon County Transit Authority	Lebanon, Pennsylvania	https://lebanontransit.org
Schuylkill Transportation System	St. Clair, Pennsylvania	https://go-sts.com
Lower Anthracite Transportation System	Mount Carmel, Pennsylvania	
River Valley Transit	Williamsport, Pennsylvania	https://www.ridervt.com
Mercer County Community Transit	Hermitage, Pennsylvania	http://www.mcrcog.com/mcct.php
