= Western Middle Anthracite Field =

Coal field in Pennsylvania, US

- Coal field
- Interactive map of Western Middle Anthracite Field
- Coordinates: 40°46′N 76°21′W
- Location: Schuylkill, Northumberland, and Columbia counties, Pennsylvania, United States
- Range: Appalachian Mountains

Dimensions
  - Length: 33 miles (53 km)
  - Width: 4 miles (6.4 km)

The Western Middle Anthracite Field is a major anthracite coal-bearing region in Schuylkill, Northumberland, and Columbia counties in Pennsylvania, United States. It is the third-largest of Pennsylvania's four anthracite fields, behind the Southern and Northern Fields. The field cuts east to west through the folded ridges and valleys of the Appalachian Mountains, just north of the Southern Anthracite Field.

== Geography and geology ==
The field runs about 33 miles east to west, threading through towns like Mahanoy City, Shenandoah, Ashland, Centralia, Mount Carmel, and Shamokin. At its widest point it stretches about four miles across. Like the rest of Pennsylvania's anthracite country, it sits in a synclinal basin — a downward fold in the earth's crust — surrounded by harder sandstone ridges that protected the coal from erosion over millions of years.

The ground here is anything but flat. The coal seams are severely folded and faulted, forcing miners to follow the coal deep into the earth — shafts in this field reached as far as 1,500 feet down. The richest seam was the Mammoth Vein, which ran more than 30 feet thick in places, making it one of the most valuable coal deposits in the entire region. Like all four of Pennsylvania's anthracite fields, the coal here was formed during the Carboniferous period and locked into the folded rock of the Valley and Ridge Province.

== Industry ==
The field was dominated for decades by the Philadelphia and Reading Coal and Iron Company (P.&R. C.&I.), formally organized in December 1871 as a subsidiary of the Philadelphia and Reading Railroad. By 1874 the company had snapped up nearly 100,000 acres of coal land — about a third of the entire Schuylkill coal field — and went on to become the largest anthracite producer in the United States, at one point controlling over 40 percent of the nation's anthracite reserves. The Susquehanna Coal Company was the other significant player in the region.

The mines pulled in workers from across the world. The earliest arrivals came from Ireland, Wales, and Germany; by the late 19th century they were followed by waves of Polish, Lithuanian, Italian, and other southern and eastern European immigrants, each group leaving its mark on the towns that grew up around the collieries. The industry hit its high-water mark in 1917, when roughly 181,000 miners dug out about 100 million tons of coal across Pennsylvania's anthracite fields. It never reached those numbers again. As deep mining grew too costly and oil and gas began replacing coal for home heating, operators shifted to surface strip mining, and one by one the old collieries went quiet.

=== Notable collieries ===
Several significant collieries operated within the Western Middle Field:

- Alaska Colliery — Located in Alaska, Northumberland County, and operated by P.&R. C.&I. At its peak in 1920, it employed 777 workers and produced approximately 300,000 tons of coal in a single year.
- Scott Colliery — Located in Kulpmont and operated by the Susquehanna Coal Company from 1894 onward.
- Bear Valley Colliery — One of the most productive operations in the field, located near Shamokin and run by P.&R. C.&I. until it was sold off in 1938.

== History ==
Coal mining in the Western Middle Field came with a long and often violent labor history. Shenandoah became one of the most notorious strongholds of the Molly Maguires in the 1870s — a secret society of Irish miners who fought back against mine owners and company-hired detectives through intimidation and, according to prosecutors, murder. By the 1890s, the field had become a center of United Mine Workers organizing. In 1902 a massive strike brought the coal industry to a standstill for months. Theodore Roosevelt stepped in, becoming the first U.S. president to act as a neutral arbitrator in a labor dispute, ultimately forcing both sides into binding arbitration.

== Environmental legacy ==
Mining here left wounds that never fully healed. Dozens of flooded underground workings continue to bleed acidic, metal-laden water into local streams. Shamokin Creek has taken the worst of it — decades of abandoned mine drainage (AMD) have degraded water quality throughout the creek and its tributaries, and cleanup efforts are ongoing.

The field's most dramatic scar is the Centralia mine fire, burning beneath the borough of Centralia since at least May 1962. It started when a trash fire at an abandoned mine pit ignited the Buck Mountain coal seam, which spread silently into the miles of tunnels below town. By the 1980s the fire had driven most of Centralia's 1,000 residents from their homes. In 1992, Pennsylvania seized all remaining properties through eminent domain. The fire still burns today at depths of up to 300 feet, with enough coal left to keep it going for another 250 years.

== See also ==
- Coal Region
- History of anthracite coal mining in Pennsylvania
- Centralia mine fire
- Philadelphia and Reading Coal and Iron Company
