= Atlas, Pennsylvania =

Unincorporated community in Pennsylvania, US

Coordinates: 40°47′58″N 76°25′41″W

- Census-designated place
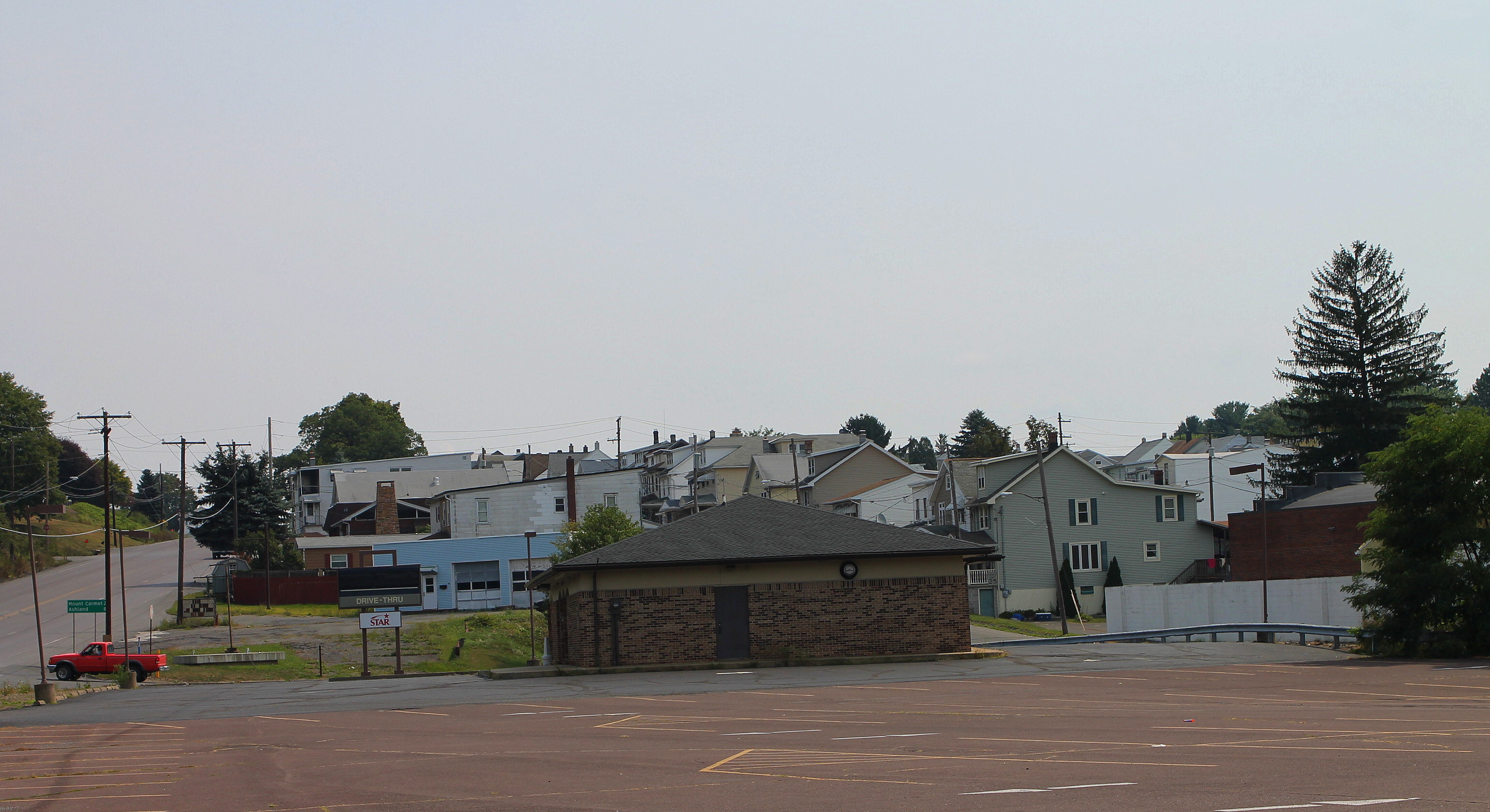
- Atlas, Pennsylvania
- Interactive map of Atlas, Pennsylvania
- Country: United States
- State: Pennsylvania
- County: Northumberland

Area
  - Total: 0.27 sq mi (0.70 km^{2})
  - Land: 0.27 sq mi (0.70 km^{2})
  - Water: 0 sq mi (0.00 km^{2})

Population (2020)
  - Total: 732
  - Density: 2,724.9/sq mi (1,052.09/km^{2})
- Time zone: UTC-5 (Eastern (EST))
  - Summer (DST): UTC-4 (EDT)
- ZIP code: 17851
- Area codes: 272 and 570
- FIPS code: 42-03464

Atlas is a census-designated place located in Mount Carmel Township, Northumberland County in the state of Pennsylvania. The community is located very close to the borough of Mount Carmel along Pennsylvania Route 61. As of the 2020 census, Atlas had a population of 732.

== Education ==
It is in the Mount Carmel Area School District.

== Notable people ==
- Eddie Costa (1930–1962), jazz musician

Historical population
Census	Pop.	Note	%±
2020	732		—
U.S. Decennial Census
