= Pennsylvania Department of Transportation =

Government agency of Pennsylvania, United States

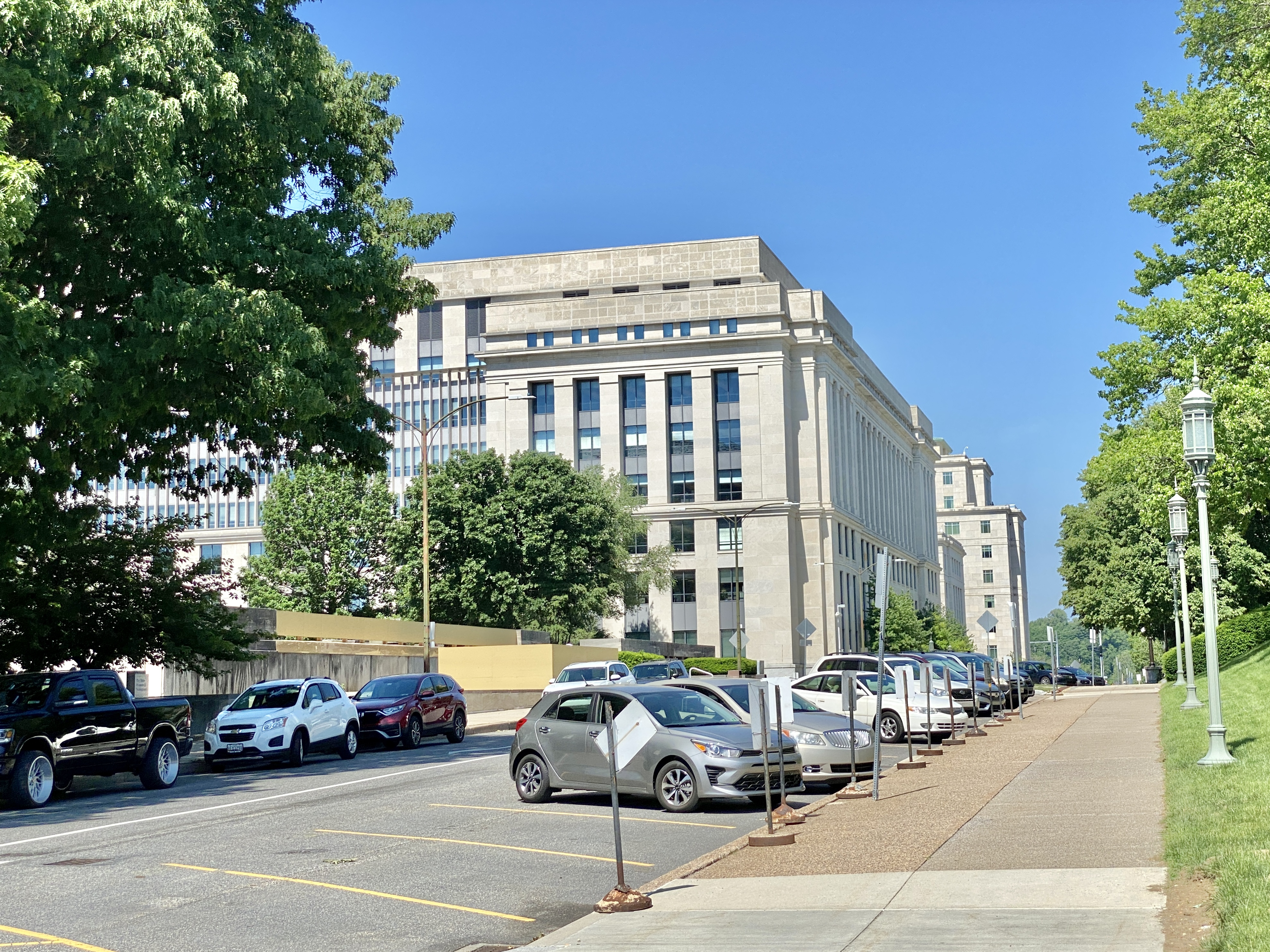
- Commonwealth Keystone Building, which has the headquarters of the agency

Agency overview
- Formed: July 1, 1970 (56 years ago)
- Preceding agencies: Department of Highways; Bureau of Motor Vehicles and Traffic Safety; Mass Transit Division; Aeronautics Commission; Department of Revenue (oversaw licensing, registration and inspection of motor vehicles)
- Jurisdiction: Commonwealth of Pennsylvania
- Headquarters: 5th Floor, Commonwealth Keystone Building, Harrisburg, Pennsylvania, U.S.; 40°15′59″N 76°53′1″W
- Employees: ~12,000
- Annual budget: $9.1 billion
- Agency executive: Michael B. Carroll, Secretary of Transportation
- Website: pa.gov/penndot

The Pennsylvania Department of Transportation (PennDOT) oversees transportation issues in the Commonwealth of Pennsylvania. The administrator of PennDOT is the Pennsylvania Secretary of Transportation, Michael B. Carroll. PennDOT supports nearly 40,000 miles (64,000 km) of state roads and highways, about 25,400 bridges, and new roadway construction with the exception of the Pennsylvania Turnpike Commission.

Other modes of transportation supervised or supported by PennDOT include aviation, rail traffic, mass transit, intrastate highway shipping traffic, motor vehicle safety and licensing, and driver licensing. PennDOT supports the Ports of Philadelphia, Pittsburgh, and Erie. The department's current budget is approximately $3.8 billion in federal and state funds. The state budget is supported by motor vehicle fuel taxes, which are dedicated solely to transportation-related state expenditures.

In recent years, PennDOT has focused on intermodal transportation, which is an attempt to enhance commerce and public transportation. PennDOT employs approximately 11,000 people.

PennDOT has extensive traffic cameras set up throughout the state's major cities, including Philadelphia, Pittsburgh, Allentown, Erie, Wilkes-Barre, Scranton, and the state capital of Harrisburg, In Wilkes-Barre, cameras are fed through to a television channel for Service Electric cable customers in the city and its suburbs. Unlike speed cameras, these cameras are primarily installed for ITS purposes, and not for law enforcement.

== History ==
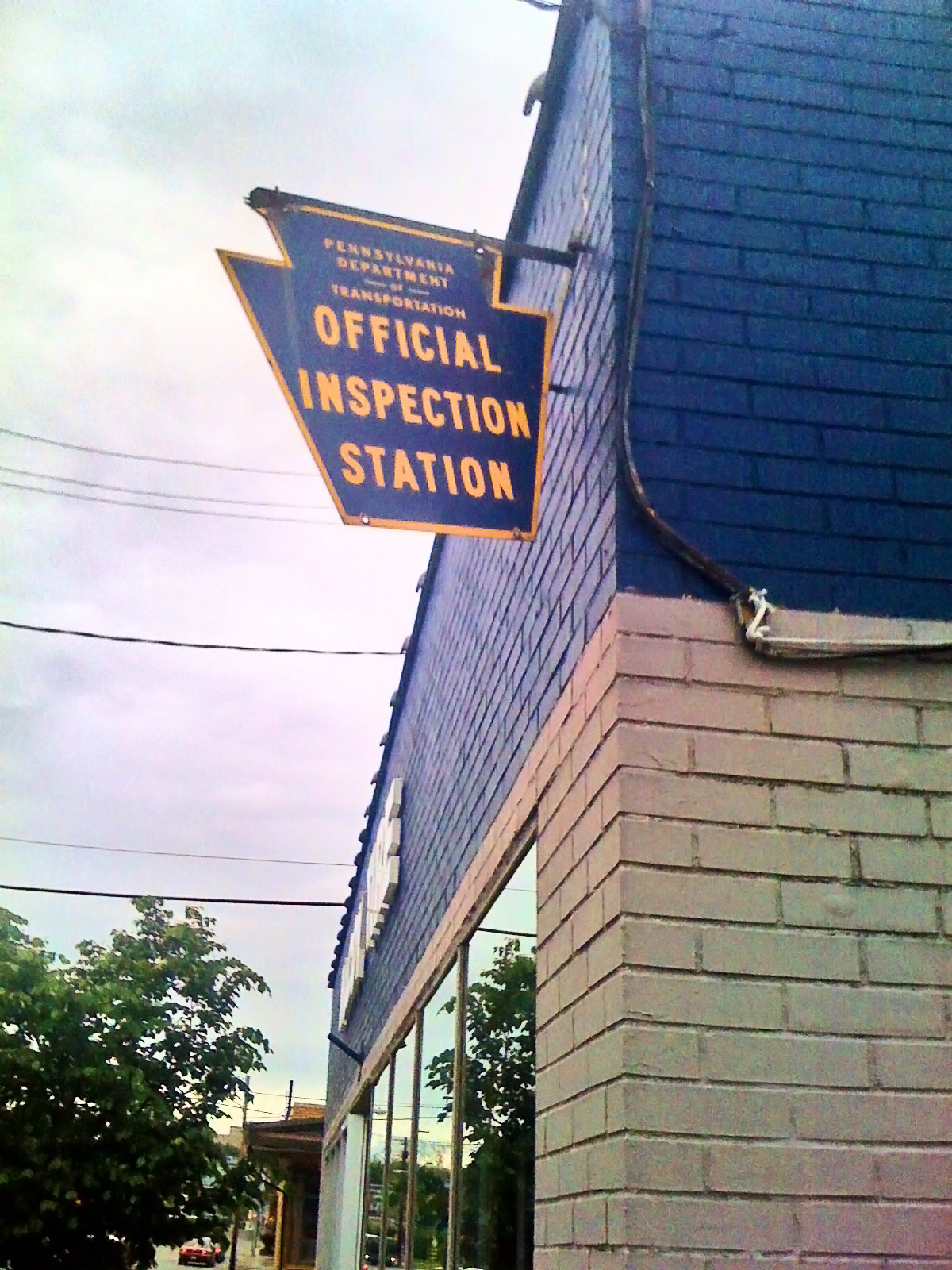
A PennDOT-issued sign at an auto garage in New Castle stating that it conducts vehicle inspections for cars registered in Pennsylvania

The Pennsylvania Department of Transportation was created from the former Department of Highways by Act 120, approved by the legislature on May 6, 1970. The intent of the legislation was to consolidate transportation-related functions formerly performed in the Departments of Commerce, Revenue, Community Affairs, Forests and Waters, Military Affairs and other state agencies.

PennDOT is responsible for constructing and maintaining a system of roads at the sole expense of the state. It controls more than 41,000 miles (66,000 km) of roadway. Townships control approximately 51,376 miles (82,682 km) of roads and streets; boroughs, 9,460 miles (15,220 km) and cities 6,779 miles (10,910 km). In all, there are more than 118,226 miles (190,266 km) of public roads, streets and toll roads in the Commonwealth.

Greatest growth in the state highway system occurred in 1931 when 20,156 miles (32,438 km) of rural roads were taken over by the Commonwealth. At that time, the Department of Highways, at the direction of Governor Gifford Pinchot, embarked upon an extensive program of paving rural roadways, well known as the "get the farmer out of the mud" program.

The Federal Government in 1916 instituted grants to the states for highway construction. These grants continue today and now comprise the key element in determining the size of the state's roadbuilding programs.

State payments to local communities for road maintenance also have continued to expand so that they average approximately $170 million annually.

The agency went into organizational decline. An effort to bring quality management principles to PennDOT over an extended period—four changes of state governor—accomplished a great deal.

== Department organization ==
PennDOT is organized into five deputates which oversee various transportation functions.

=== Highway Administration ===
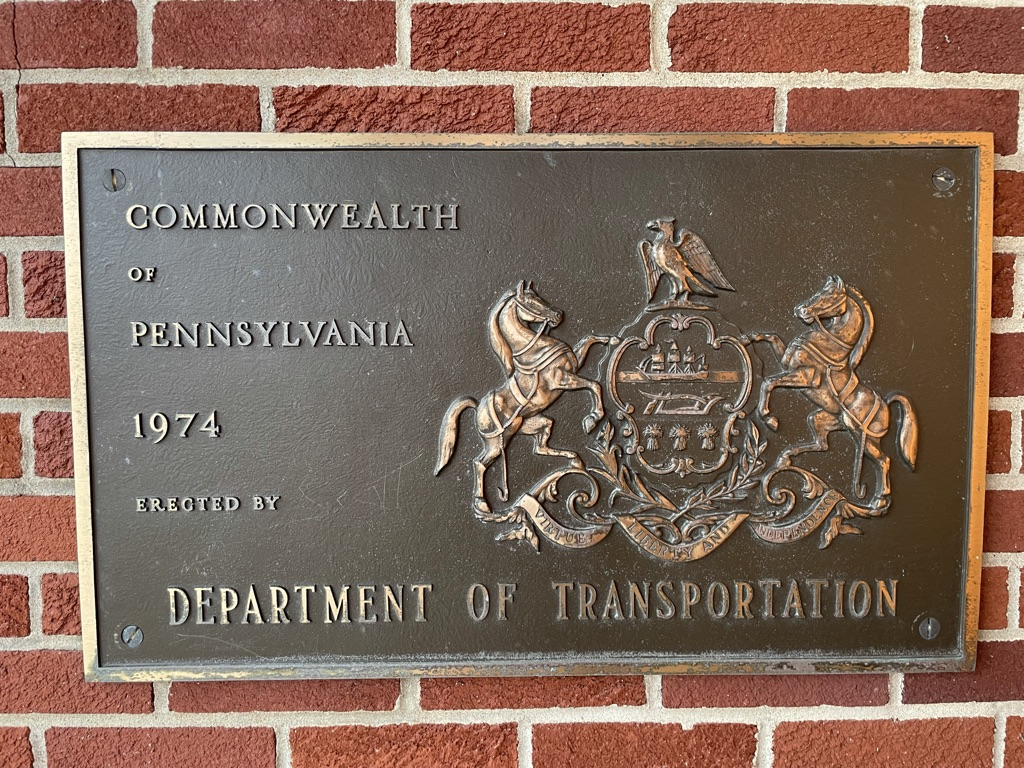
A PennDOT plaque at an interstate highway rest area

The Highway Administration deputate oversees 39,737 miles (63,951 km) of roadway and 25,400 bridges in Pennsylvania which comprise the Pennsylvania State Route System. The deputate is made up of over 9,300 employees in design, construction, maintenance, materials testing, environmental review, safety, and traffic engineering. There are eleven engineering districts located throughout the state.

=== Driver & Vehicle Services ===
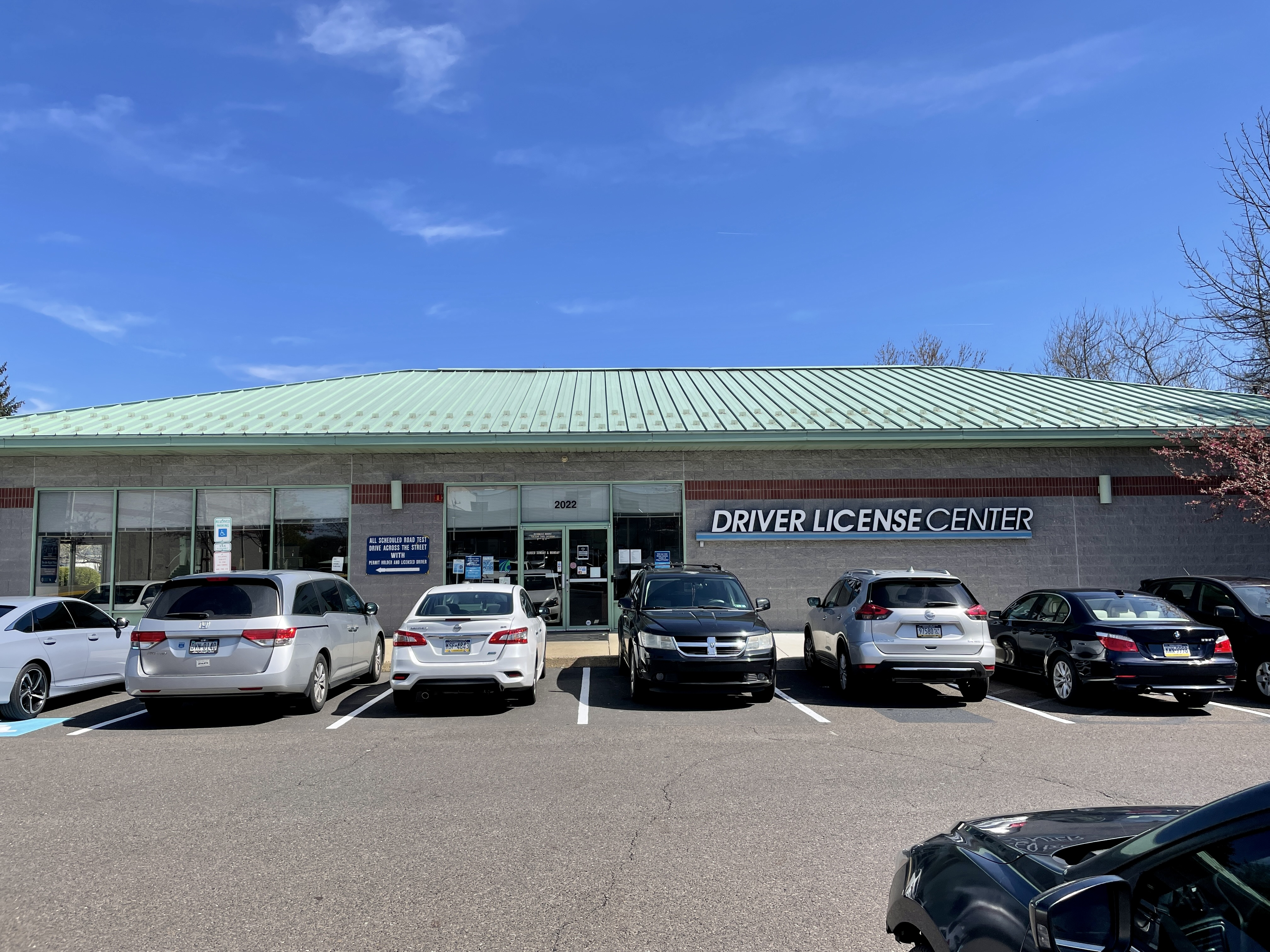
A PennDOT Driver License Center in Huntingdon Valley

PennDOT is responsible for motor vehicle titles and registration, along with issuing driver licenses through the Driver & Vehicle Services deputate. Somewhat uniquely, PennDOT does not operate typical DMV offices, such as those that exist in other states. Rather, they operate "Driver and Photo License Centers", for full service regarding drivers licenses. This includes activities like taking driver's tests, getting driver's license photographs taken, or requesting a replacement for a lost drivers license. In addition to this, the department also operates "Photo License Centers" which solely take photographs for drivers licenses. There are 75 Drivers and Photo License Centers and 26 Photo License Centers operated by PennDOT. Transactions relating to motor vehicles, such as vehicle title transfers or replacing a lost registration plate, which would typically be handled by a DMV office in other states, are handled by a network of private businesses called "messenger services", which contract with the department. They operate by charging service fees on top of the fees that PennDOT charges. Some messenger services also have a limited ability to perform driver's license services, such as changing a driver's license address or renewing a driver's license, but not taking the associated photo. An exception to this method of operation is at the PennDOT headquarters in Harrisburg, which has a large room for all motor vehicle transactions and drivers' license transactions, with a separate room for photographing and issuing licenses to motorists.

=== Planning ===
The Planning deputate develops the Twelve Year Transportation Program in collaboration with the federal government and local planning organizations, which guides improvements to transportation in Pennsylvania. It is also in charge of the cash flow from the federal and state governments to fund improvement projects along with working on long-range research and map making.

=== Multimodal Transportation ===
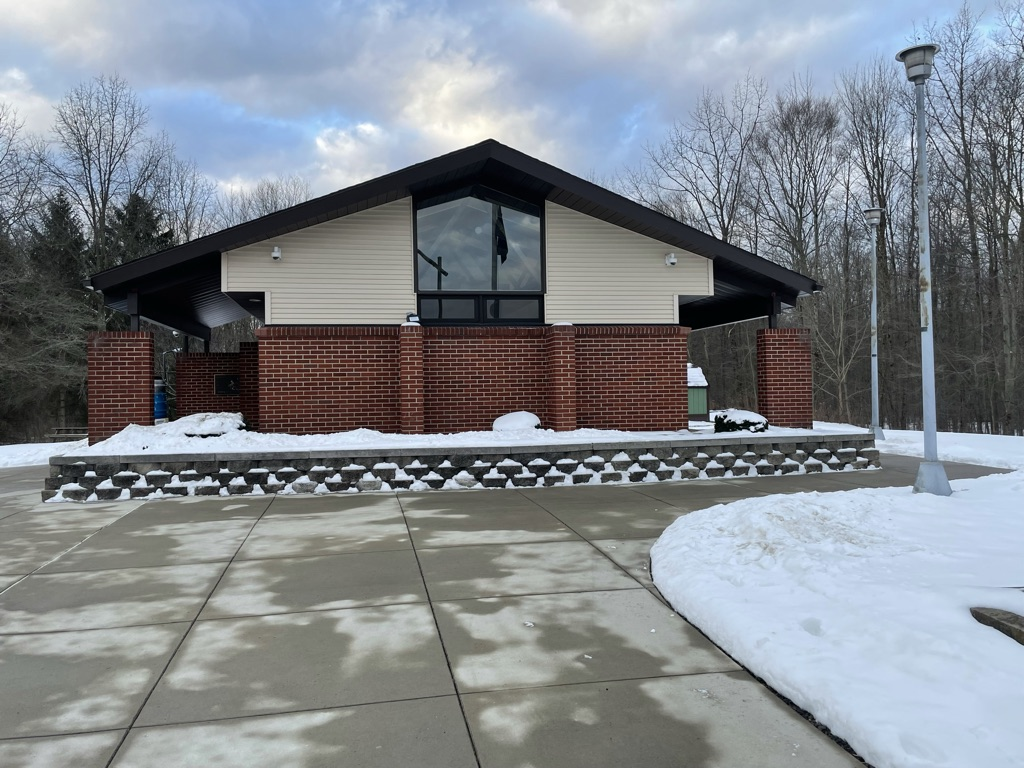
A Pennsylvania interstate highway rest area

The Multimodal Transportation deputate oversees aviation, rail freight transport, public transportation, ports, and pedestrian and bicycle transportation. The deputate oversees airports in Pennsylvania, which includes 127 public airports, 243 private airports, and 280 private heliports. Multimodal Transportation also looks over 65 railroads which operate over 5,600 miles (9,000 km) of track in the state. PennDOT oversees bicycle routes across the state, including the state-designated BicyclePA bicycle routes and the portions of the federally-designated United States Bicycle Route System located within Pennsylvania.

PennDOT provides the primary funding for two Amtrak trains in Pennsylvania that operate along the Keystone Corridor. The Keystone Service runs between Harrisburg and New York City via Philadelphia and offers multiple daily departures. The Pennsylvanian runs between Pittsburgh and New York City via Philadelphia and operates once daily in each direction.

The Mulitmodal Transportation deputate supports public transit authorities in Pennsylvania, which consists of 34 agencies providing fixed-route and demand responsive transport to urban and rural areas and 18 agencies providing demand responsive transport only. The deputate also supports intercity bus service in the state. PennDOT provides funding for ten intercity bus routes that cross the state, connecting rural areas to cities and providing connections to Amtrak, airports, and local public transit; the routes are operated by Fullington Trailways and Greyhound Lines.

=== Administration ===
The administration deputate is charged with managing various bureaus that overee fiscal management, computer systems, mobile applications, telecommunications, contract compliance, training, employee safety, human resources, office services, facilities management, quality improvements, partnerships with other government agencies and communities, and employees engagement activities. The deputate is also in charge of Pennsylvania Welcome Centers located along major highways entering the state.

== Pennsylvania bridges ==
According to a 2011 study by Transportation for America, 26.5% of Pennsylvania's bridges were structurally deficient and the state led the United States with six metropolitan areas with a high percentage of deficient bridges. These figures would have been higher, but the state had recently undertaken a program to quadruple state funding for bridge repairs.

Across the United States, over 41,000 bridges are deemed "structurally deficient", which means they need repairs, contain a piece rated as "poor," and might also have a weight limit. The term structurally deficient does not mean a bridge is unsafe for travel. In Pennsylvania, eight of the top ten most traveled structurally deficient bridges are in Philadelphia.

Pennsylvania has the second highest number of structurally deficient bridges in the U.S. Overall, the state has 25,000 bridges excluding privately owned bridges, which is the third-largest number of bridges in the U.S. Pennsylvania has launched a program called the Rapid Bridge Replacement project to increase the number of bridges it fixes. The project is a public-private partnership between PennDOT and the private firm Plenary Walsh Keystone Partners. The project fixed almost 700 bridges in 2014.

== Districts ==
PennDOT is divided into engineering districts to localize engineering and maintenance. The following is a table of the districts and their associated headquarters. The statewide headquarters for PennDOT is located in the Commonwealth Keystone Building in Harrisburg.

District	Counties	Headquarters
1	Crawford County; Erie County; Forest County; Mercer County; Venango County; Warren County	Oil City, Venango County
2	Cameron County; Centre County; Clearfield County; Clinton County; Elk County; Juniata County; McKean County; Mifflin County; Potter County	Clearfield, Clearfield County
3	Bradford County; Columbia County; Lycoming County; Montour County; Northumberland County; Snyder County; Sullivan County; Tioga County; Union County	Montoursville, Lycoming County
4	Lackawanna County; Luzerne County; Pike County; Susquehanna County; Wayne County; Wyoming County	Dunmore, Lackawanna County
5	Berks County; Carbon County; Lehigh County; Monroe County; Northampton County; Schuylkill County	Allentown, Lehigh County
6	Bucks County; Chester County; Delaware County; Montgomery County; City and County of Philadelphia	King of Prussia, Montgomery County
8	Adams County; Cumberland County; Dauphin County; Franklin County; Lancaster County; Lebanon County; Perry County; York County	Harrisburg, Dauphin County
9	Bedford County; Blair County; Cambria County; Fulton County; Huntingdon County; Somerset County	Hollidaysburg, Blair County
10	Armstrong County; Butler County; Clarion County; Indiana County; Jefferson County	Indiana, Indiana County
11	Allegheny County; Beaver County; Lawrence County	Bridgeville, Allegheny County
12	Fayette County; Greene County; Washington County; Westmoreland County	Uniontown, Fayette County

== Criticism ==
PennDOT has received criticism over the years regarding the quality of the roads in the Commonwealth, as Pennsylvania has previously ranked among the worst maintained road systems in the United States. This is partly explained by the freeze-thaw cycle creating potholes, the Karst Topography leading Pennsylvania prone to sinkholes, heavy commercial traffic, and funding issues.

== See also ==
- List of Pennsylvania state agencies
- List of state routes in Pennsylvania
- Keystone Markers
- Vehicle registration plates of Pennsylvania
