= Alaska Colliery =

Colliery in Alaska, Pennsylvania

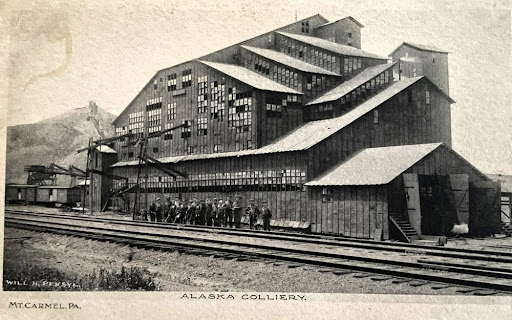
- Alaska Colliery, circa 1910.
- Interactive map of Alaska Colliery
- 40.783474°N 76.43807°W
- Location: Alaska, Northumberland County, Pennsylvania

History
- Built: 1873–1874
- Demolished: mid-20th century

Site notes
- Owner: Philadelphia and Reading Coal and Iron Company (1874–1954); Reading Anthracite Company (1954–c.1960s)

The Alaska Colliery was an anthracite mine established in 1873 in Alaska, Pennsylvania, approximately two miles southwest of Mount Carmel. It operated in the Western Middle Anthracite Field and was owned by the Philadelphia and Reading Coal and Iron Company (P.&R. C.&I.), organized in 1871 by Franklin B. Gowen to consolidate the Philadelphia and Reading Railroad's coal holdings.

Construction of the colliery began in 1873. A fire destroyed several structures at the Alaska Shaft in 1874 while they were still being built. The colliery later experienced major breaker fires in 1886 and 1926. The colliery closed permanently on April 30, 1954, when the Philadelphia and Reading Coal and Iron Company cited the exhaustion of coal reserves that could be mined at a profit. The site was later converted to surface strip mining. Beginning in 1958, the Reading Anthracite Company demolished much of the nearby village of Alaska as strip mining expanded.

== Development and technical details (1873–1930) ==
The colliery was established in 1873 to mine coal from the Mammoth Vein. Shaft sinking was completed in 1874. On its first day of operation, 2,510 tons of coal were shipped to market. An air shaft was sunk at the mine in 1875.

The main shaft was bored to a depth of 270 feet using diamond drills. At the time, the colliery was projected to employ more workers than all other collieries in the Mount Carmel area combined. Operations used vertical shafts and inclined slopes to reach deep reserves. The No. 3 slope was driven 160 feet (49 m) into the bottom split of the Mammoth Vein to reach the basin of the seam.

In June 1897, the Baldwin Locomotive Works supplied a compound compressed-air locomotive to the Alaska shaft for underground haulage.

By 1899 the Alaska Colliery was described as the largest of the Reading Company's industries in the region, with nearly one thousand men and boys employed. In October of that year it worked twenty-six nine-hour days — more than any other colliery in the area since 1895. The Reading Company also installed a 50,000-gallon supply tank at the colliery that year, and put in a new scraper line from the colliery to the railroad tracks for loading culm onto cars destined for railroad construction at West Milton and Newbury.

Also in 1899, contractor Thomas Dolan of Pottsville was engaged to drive a tunnel at the colliery in hopes of piercing the Lykens Valley Vein in workable condition. Company officials believed success would make Alaska one of the most profitable collieries they owned, as demand for Lykens coal consistently exceeded supply and collieries working that vein operated six to eight days per month more than others.

In November 1902, sharpshooter Annie Oakley and members of her traveling company visited the colliery's underground workings, her first experience of anthracite mining. She later expressed sympathy with the miners' desire for better pay and increased safeguards. The party also toured the Alaska breaker, where they observed boys at work along the coal chutes.

In 1913, the P.&R. C.&I. announced plans to electrify the colliery — lighting the breaker and underground passages with electricity and running all breaker machinery on electric power. The company's stated goal was to make Alaska the largest electrically operated mine in the anthracite coal fields. By 1915, mechanical loading and electric haulage were in place.

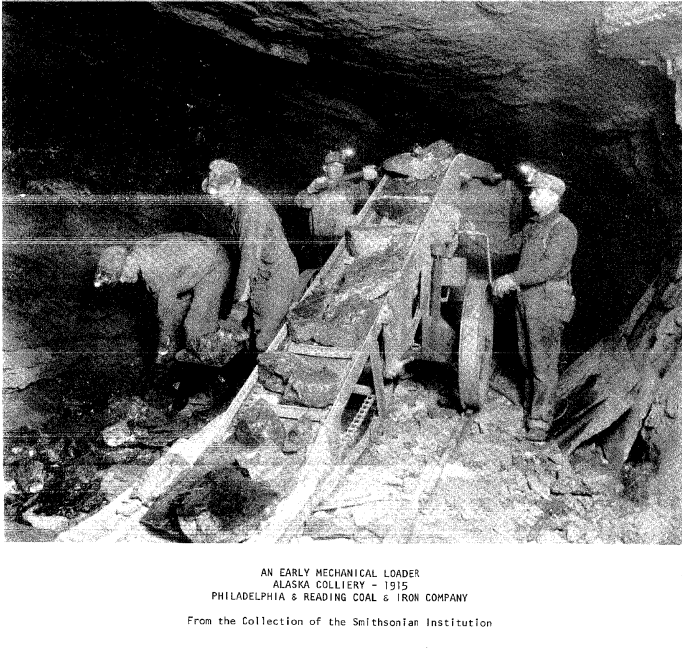
Mechanical loading of coal at the Alaska Colliery, circa 1915.

By 1920, the colliery employed 777 workers.

== Construction fire of 1874 ==
On March 15, 1874, fire destroyed the engine house, boiler house, and shaft house of the Alaska Shaft. The structures were still under construction at the time.

== Breaker fire of 1886 ==
The Alaska Breaker burned on June 5, 1886. The fire also destroyed the adjoining saw-mill. The cause was never conclusively determined. Investigators thought either a hot roller shaft had ignited the wooden framework, or that a worker's lamp had been left near oil-soaked timber.

The breaker had been valued at $100,000. When running at full capacity it processed about 25,000 tons of coal per month, with 500 workers employed and a monthly payroll of $20,000. Workers in the shaft below the breaker reached the surface only minutes before the burning structure collapsed into the mine workings. All other employees evacuated without reported fatalities.

== Breaker fire of 1926 ==
On April 19, 1926, the wooden breaker was destroyed by a fire that started in the conveyor line. Damages were estimated at $500,000.

The fire put about 650 underground workers out of work. Company officials at the P.&R. C.&I. offices in Mount Carmel said workers would return within the week, and that coal from Alaska would be processed at other Reading properties in the meantime. More than 200 men were put to work cleaning up the site the next day. The building carried no insurance. A locomotive spark was considered an unlikely cause — the wind at the time of the fire would have carried any sparks away from the structure.

== Mining accidents ==
The Alaska Colliery was the site of several fatal accidents. On February 14, 1916, T. Garagaka, 48, of Mount Carmel, was killed while prying down top coal on the slope. When the coal fell, he was knocked backwards. His head struck the bottom, breaking his neck. Several ribs were also broken. He lived about twenty minutes after the accident. Services were held at Our Mother of Consolation Church, with interment at Merriam Hill Cemetery.

On June 18, 1935, a gas explosion on the old number seven slope killed one miner and injured four others. The blast occurred at nine o'clock in the morning. John Olshefski, 52, of Mount Carmel, died from his injuries. John Ruscuskie of Mount Carmel, who received the most severe burns to his face, hands, and back, was treated at Ashland State Hospital. Michael Seback, 21, of Mount Carmel, and Albert and Thomas Fetsko of Shamokin sustained minor burns; Thomas Fetsko was also admitted to Geisinger Memorial Hospital in Danville. The Philadelphia and Reading Coal and Iron Company opened an investigation into the cause. Olshefski was survived by his widow and thirteen children, including Alex Olshefski, captain and guard of the Mount Carmel High School football team. Services were held at Our Mother of Consolation Church, with interment at Merriam Hill Cemetery.

On November 15, 1943, Walter Lavish, 24, of Mount Carmel, was fatally injured while working as a bottomman on No. 18 plane. He was moving mine cars when he fell between a loaded and an empty car. Other workers found him unconscious. He was taken to Ashland State Hospital, where he died several hours later from a badly fractured skull. He was survived by his parents and seven siblings. Services were held at Our Mother of Consolation Church.

== Closure and later surface mining ==
Deep mining at the Alaska Colliery became increasingly difficult through the 1930s and 1940s due to high pumping costs. In April 1944, the company announced plans to abandon operations, citing the "prohibitive cost of dewatering" the deep slopes.

In September 1950, members of the Alaska Local of the United Mine Workers of America launched a campaign to prolong the life of the colliery. The union had not been officially informed of any closure plans but said there were signs that the supply of readily accessible coal was swiftly becoming depleted. A committee composed of Bernard Shalonis, Francis Johnson, and Felix Barnes met with company officials, but received no assurance that further measures would be taken to keep the mine open. The committee reported to a group of Mount Carmel business people that closure would throw approximately 500 men out of work and would seriously affect the economic life of the community. Experienced miners argued that sinking a new slope and tunnel to tap the Lykens Vein — the same vein the company had attempted to reach in 1899 — would expose millions of tons of coal sufficient to keep the colliery working for many more years. Recent tests had shown the coal in that vein to be five feet, eight inches thick.

By 1953, hard coal production across the 24th Anthracite Inspection District — which ran from the Alaska Colliery west to Dornsife and East and West Cameron townships — had fallen to 2,229,279 tons, down from 3,044,317 tons the previous year, a decline of over 815,000 tons.

The colliery continued operating until its final closure on April 30, 1954, when George J. Clark, vice president and general manager of P.&R. C.&I., announced that the remaining coal reserves which might be mined at a profit were exhausted. Some 300 men were affected by the closure.

The Reading Anthracite Company later began surface strip mining at the site. Original colliery structures were demolished to make way for the operation. The village of Alaska — also known as Mount Carmel Junction — was home to about 40 residents at the time, in houses that were over a century old. By June 1958, equipment was already on site and most families had moved elsewhere. The residential area was entirely cleared by the mid-1960s.

== See also ==
- Alaska, Northumberland County, Pennsylvania
- Scott Colliery
- Kulpmont, Pennsylvania
- Locust Gap, Pennsylvania
