= Moon Transportation Authority =

The Moon Transportation Authority (MTA) is an authority board that was created in 1986 by a resolution agreed to by Moon Township, Pennsylvania and the Moon Area School District. The MTA is funded through the diversion of local property taxes collected to fund the school district and township; this is called a Local Economic Revitalization Tax Assistance (LERTA) Revenue Allocation Program (RAP).

== History ==
The MTA was established to promote infrastructure and economic development in Moon Township. Since its inception, it has financed and constructed three new interchanges and several connector roads along Business Route 60. Each project has enhanced the transportation network in Moon Township and opened hundreds of acres of land for development.

The MTA is an authority board composed of two representatives from Moon Township, two representatives from the Moon Area School District, and one local business leader. Current Board members are as follows; President Mark Scappe, a member of the MASD Board of Education; Vice President John Hertzer, a member of the Moon Township Board of Supervisors; Secretary Treasurer Thomas Weaver, a local business leader; Michael Hauser, a member of the MASD Board of Education; and James Vitale, a member of the Moon Township Board of Supervisors.

== Controversy ==
In the summer of 2020, at a public meeting of the Moon Area School District's Board of Education, several school boards announced they had just become aware that their school board colleague and MTA President Mark Scappe is employed by a company that is awarded MTA contracts. His business, RBS Consultants, was purchased by developer RHEA in 2014, and RHEA frequently contracts with the MTA, including in the summer of 2020. Mr. Scappe expressed no remorse for failing to inform his colleagues of the purchase and resulting conflict of interest, and described the relationship as "not a big deal."
