= Mount Carmel Township, Pennsylvania =

Township in Pennsylvania, US

Coordinates: 40°46′00″N 76°27′59″W

- Township
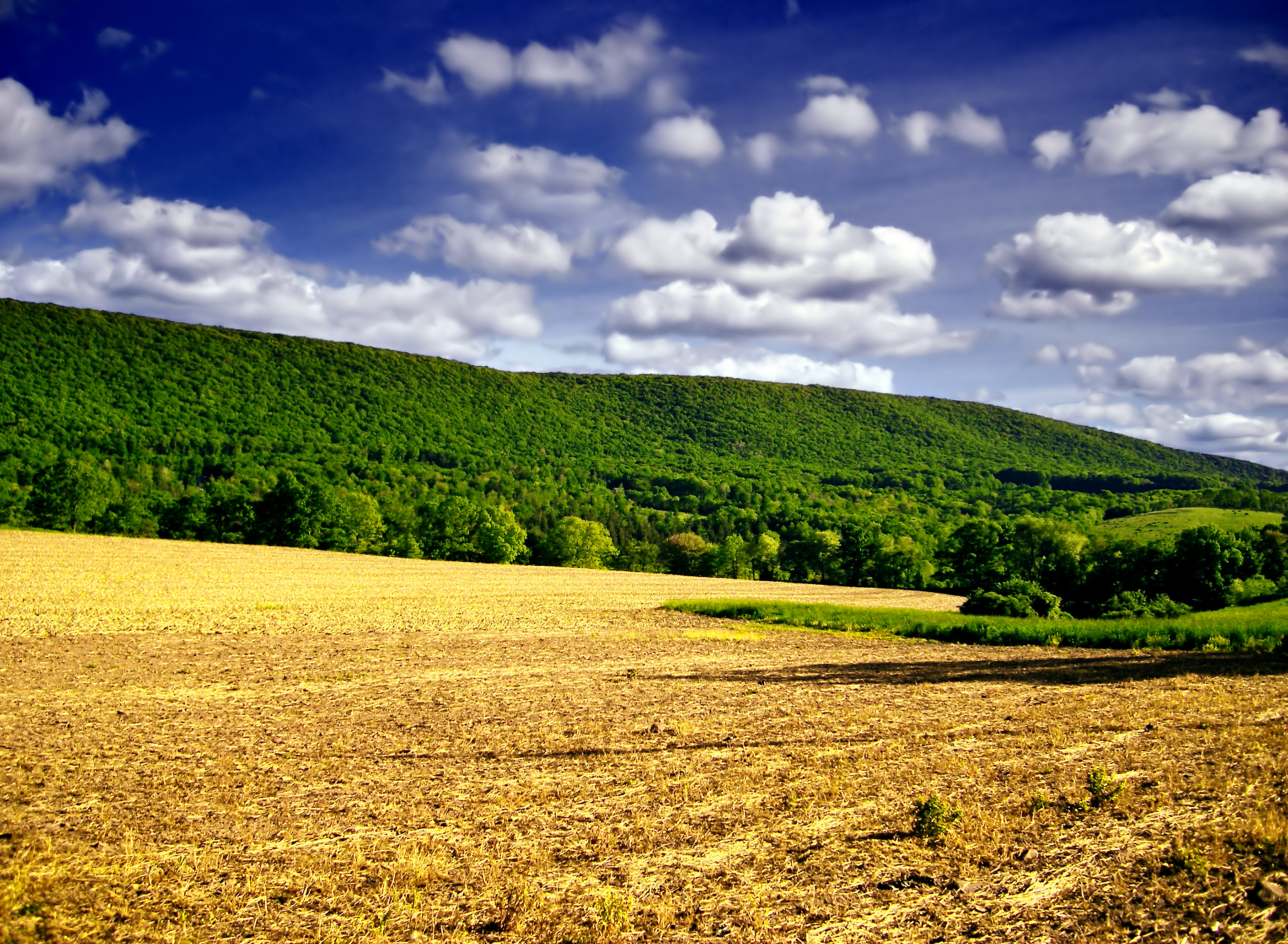
- Ridge-and-valley landscape, Mount Carmel Township.

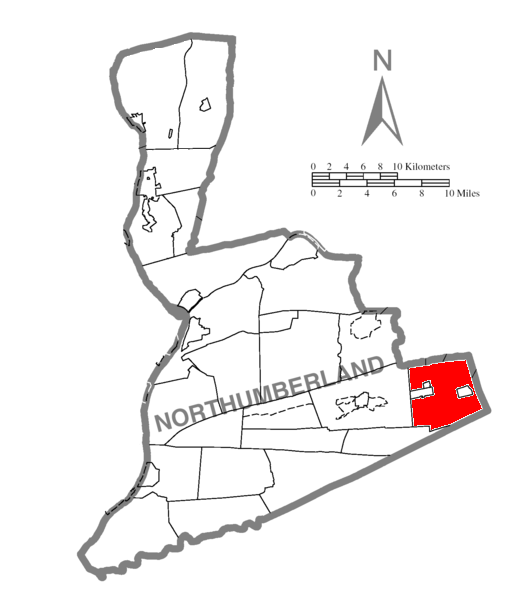
- Map of Northumberland County, Pennsylvania highlighting Mount Carmel Township

- Map of Northumberland County, Pennsylvania
- Country: United States
- State: Pennsylvania
- County: Northumberland
- Incorporated: 1854

Government
  - Type: Board of Supervisors (3) Aaron Domanski Charles Gasperetti Matthew Susnoskie

Area
  - Total: 21.53 sq mi (55.75 km^{2})
  - Land: 21.35 sq mi (55.29 km^{2})
  - Water: 0.18 sq mi (0.47 km^{2})

Population (2010)
  - Total: 3,139
  - Estimate (2016): 3,044
  - Density: 142.6/sq mi (55.06/km^{2})
- Time zone: UTC-5 (Eastern (EST))
  - Summer (DST): UTC-4 (EDT)
- Area code: 570
- FIPS code: 42-097-51504
- Website: Township Site

Mount Carmel Township is a township that is located in Northumberland County, Pennsylvania in the United States. The population at the time of the 2010 Census was 3,139, which was an increase over the figure of 2,701 that was tabulated during the 2000.

== History ==
Established in 1854, this American township was named after Mount Carmel in Israel and was formed from part of Coal Township.

== Geography ==
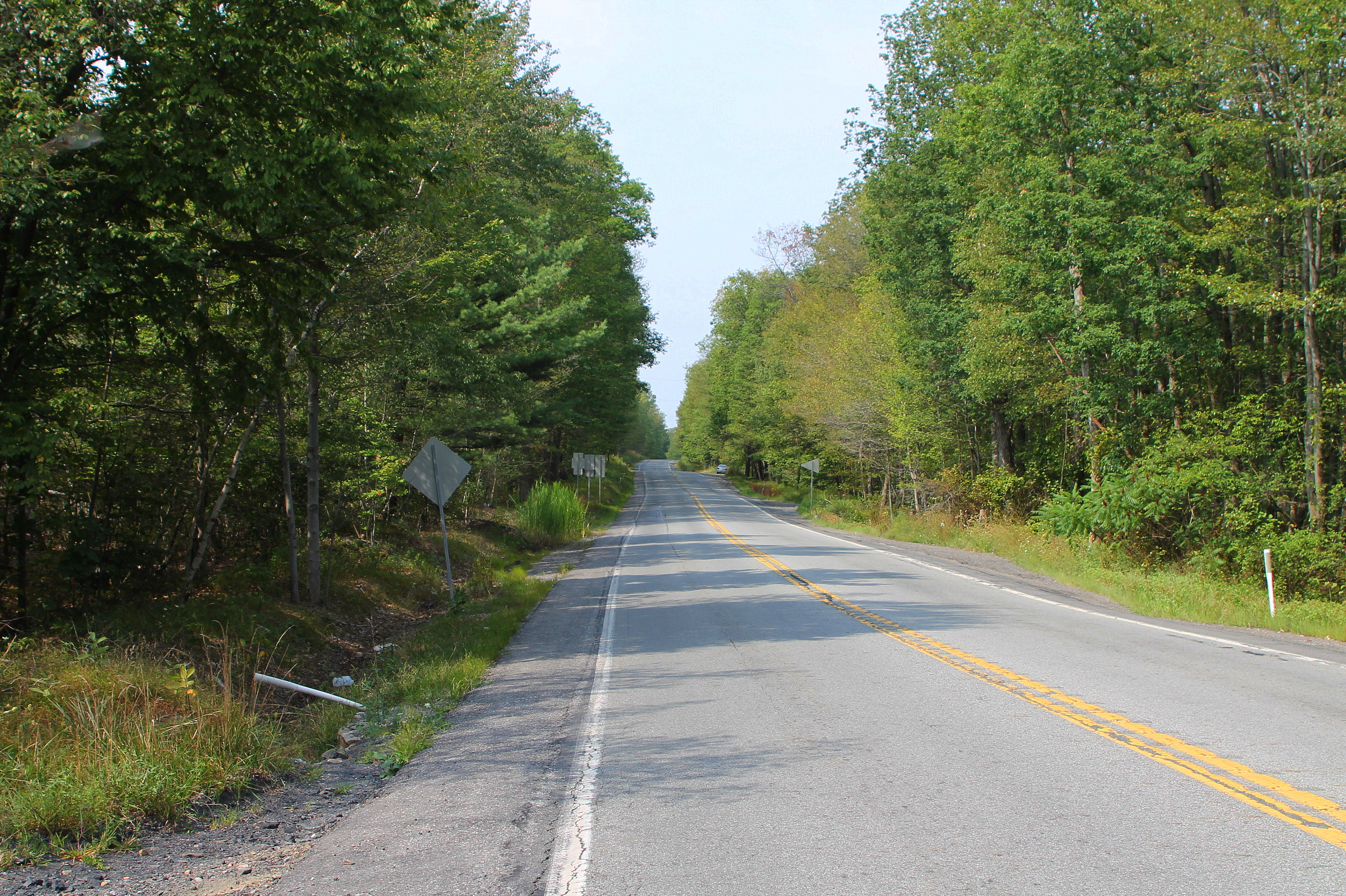
Pennsylvania Route 901 in Mount Carmel Township

According to the United States Census Bureau, the township has a total area of 22.0 square miles (57 km^{2}), of which 21.8 square miles (56 km^{2}) is land and 0.2 square miles (0.52 km^{2}) (0.82%) is water.

It neighbors the boroughs of Mount Carmel, Kulpmont, and Marion Heights just beyond its borders.

Township villages include: Atlas, Beaverdale, Connorsville, Den Mar Gardens, Diamondtown, Dooleyville, Locust Gap, Merriam, Mount Carmel Estates, Natalie, Oak Ridge Estates, Reliance, Shady Acres, and Strong.

== Demographics ==
Historical population
Census	Pop.	Note	%±
1990	2,679		—
2000	2,701		0.8%
2010	3,139		16.2%
2016 (est.)	3,044		−3.0%
U.S. Decennial Census

As of the census of 2000, there were 2,701 people, 1,086 households, and 729 families residing in the township.

The population density was 47.8 people/km^{2} (124 people/mi^{2}). There were 1,250 housing units at an average density of 22.1 units/km^{2} (57 units/mi^{2}).

The racial makeup of the township was 99.56% White, 0.11% Asian, 0.04% Pacific Islander, 0.04% from other races, and 0.26% from two or more races. Hispanic or Latino of any race were 0.11% of the population.

There were 1,086 households, out of which 27.0% had children under the age of eighteen who were living with them, 51.3% were married couples living together, 11.1% had a female householder with no husband present, and 32.8% were non-families. Out of all of the households that were documented, 30.3% were made up of individuals, and 17.6% had someone living alone who was sixty-five years of age or older.

The average household size was 2.36 and the average family size was 2.93.

Within the township, the population was spread out, with 20.9% of residents who were under the age of eighteen, 5.5% who were aged eighteen to twenty-four, 23.4% who were aged twenty-five to sixty-four, 24.8% who were aged forty-five to sixty-four, and 25.4% who were sixty-five years of age or older. The median age was forty-five years.

For every one hundred females, there were 88.0 males. For every one hundred females who were aged eighteen or older, there were 82.3 males.

The median income for a household in the township was $28,438, and the median income for a family was $35,847. Males had a median income of $31,713 compared with that of $23,047 for females.

The per capita income for the township was $15,376.

Approximately 9.4% of families and 10.8% of the population were living below the poverty line, including 12.0% of those who were under the age of eighteen and 13.1% of those who were aged sixty-five or older.
