= Mount Carmel, Pennsylvania =

Borough in Northumberland County, Pennsylvania

Mount Carmel
- Borough
- Borough of Mount Carmel
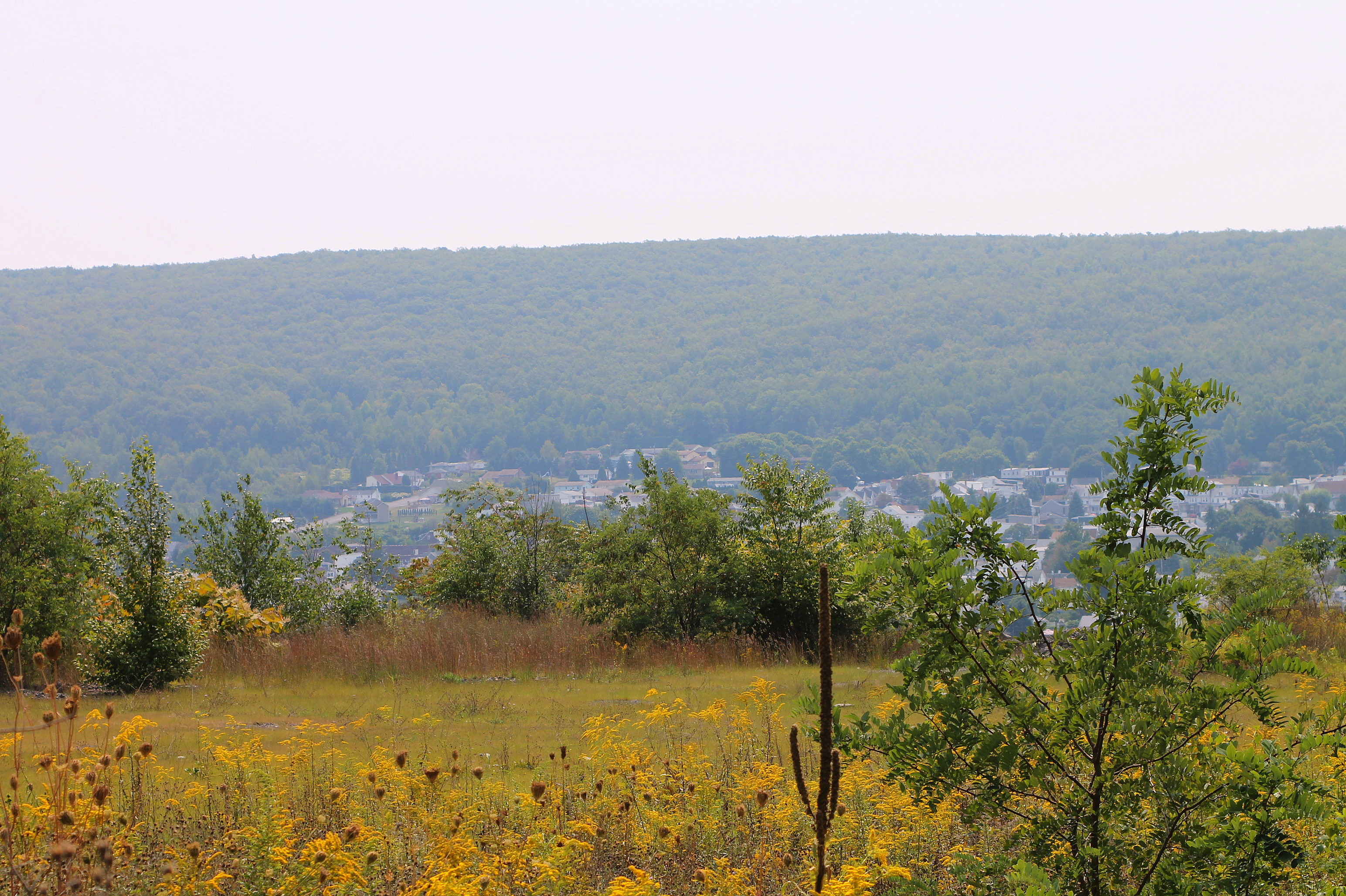
- View of Mount Carmel from the northeast

- Seal

- Location of Mount Carmel in Northumberland County, Pennsylvania

- Location of Mount Carmel in Pennsylvania Mount Carmel (the United States)
- Coordinates: 40°47′47″N 76°24′44″W
- Country: United States
- State: Pennsylvania
- County: Northumberland
- Settled: 1770
- Incorporated, Township: November 14, 1854
- Incorporated, Borough: November 3, 1862

Government
  - Mayor: Philip Cimino
  - Council President: Elijah Watkins

Area
  - Total: 0.66 sq mi (1.71 km^{2})
  - Land: 0.66 sq mi (1.71 km^{2})
  - Water: 0 sq mi (0.00 km^{2})
- Elevation (center of borough): 1,100 ft (340 m)
- Highest elevation (southeastern boundary): 1,300 ft (400 m)
- Lowest elevation (Shamokin Creek on western boundary): 1,035 ft (315 m)

Population (2020)
  - Total: 5,725
  - Density: 8,653.6/sq mi (3,341.16/km^{2})
- Time zone: UTC-5 (EST)
  - Summer (DST): UTC-4 (EDT)
- ZIP code: 17851
- Area codes: 570 and 272
- FIPS code: 42-51496
- Website: www.mountcarmelborough.org

Mount Carmel is a borough in Northumberland County, Pennsylvania, United States, located in the Coal Region of the central Susquehanna River Valley. The population was 5,725 at the 2020 census. Situated 88 miles (142 km) northwest of Philadelphia and 71 miles (114 km) northeast of Harrisburg, the borough is completely encircled by Mount Carmel Township and sits within the Western Middle Anthracite Field. Mount Carmel is known for its role in the anthracite coal industry, for being home to Lieutenant General James M. Gavin of World War II fame, and for being the site of what the Smithsonian Institution identifies as the world's first isolated electrical generating plant, established in 1883.

== History ==
The area that would become Mount Carmel was successively part of Chester, Lancaster, and Berks counties before the formation of Northumberland County in 1772. Europeans first settled the area around 1770, and anthracite coal was discovered nearby in 1790 by Isaac Tomlinson on Broad Mountain. According to local historian Herbert Bell, the borough was named by sawmill operator Albert Bradford, who drew inspiration from the Biblical Mount Carmel in Israel, finding the elevated mountain setting comparable to the holy site.

Mining did not begin in earnest until the 1830s, but the arrival of the railroad dramatically accelerated development. During the latter part of 1854, the Philadelphia and Sunbury Railroad was completed from Shamokin to Mount Carmel, opening the region to large-scale coal extraction. That same year, the Locust Mountain Coal and Iron Company commenced major improvements to their coal lands near the borough, constructing breakers for the Coal Ridge and Locust Mountain collieries. Mount Carmel Township was incorporated in 1854 from part of Coal Township, and the borough itself was incorporated in 1862.

Mount Carmel was among the first communities in the United States to have its streets lit by electricity. On November 17, 1883, the Edison Electric Illuminating Company of Mount Carmel was founded. The Smithsonian Institution identifies the plant as the first isolated electrical generating plant in the world and the fifth electrical plant constructed on the Edison system.

The borough reached its population peak in the early 20th century, when its economy was anchored by massive nearby mining operations, including the Alaska Colliery and the Scott Colliery, which were among the most productive facilities in the Western Middle Anthracite Field. The borough also supported a wide range of related industries including miners' equipment manufacturing, silk mills, knitting mills, foundries, lumber yards, and a packing plant. Tensions from the industrial boom boiled over in April 1906, when striking miners were shot by troopers of the State Constabulary during a labor dispute; ten men were injured, all of whom survived.

The coal industry's decline after World War I set off a long demographic contraction that continued through the remainder of the century, with the borough's population falling from its 1930 peak of 17,967 to under 6,000 by the year 2000.

=== Notable events ===
On June 17, 1948, United Airlines Flight 624 crashed near Midvalley Colliery No. 2 just outside the borough, killing all 43 people on board.

=== Timeline ===
- 1681, March 4 – Charles II of England grants a land charter to William Penn, creating the Province of Pennsylvania.
- 1682, August 24 – Penn divides the Province into three counties: Philadelphia, Bucks, and Chester; the site of Mount Carmel falls within Chester County's claimed territory.
- 1729, May 10 – Lancaster County created from part of Chester County.
- 1749, August 22 – Land comprising the Mount Carmel area purchased from the Six Nations of the Iroquois Confederation.
- 1752, March 11 – Berks County created from part of Lancaster County.
- 1770 – Europeans first settle the area; the Centre Turnpike path is surveyed by Francis Yarnall.
- 1772, March 21 – Northumberland County formed; the area that would become Mount Carmel is located in Augusta Township.
- 1790 – Anthracite coal discovered by Isaac Tomlinson on nearby Broad Mountain.
- 1805, March 25 – Centre Turnpike Company incorporated.
- 1808 – Centre Turnpike construction begins.
- 1812 – Mount Carmel Inn opens on the Centre Turnpike, operated by Richard Yarnall.
- c.1830s – Coal mining begins in the area.
- 1837 – Coal Township formed from parts of Little Mahanoy and Shamokin townships.
- 1846 – First Post Office opens in Mount Carmel.
- 1847 – Land now comprising Mount Carmel Borough purchased by speculators.
- 1853 – Town plot finalized.
- 1854, November 14 – Mount Carmel Township incorporated from part of Coal Township.
- 1855 – Evangelical Grace Church, the town's first church, opens at Third and Market Streets.
- 1862, November 3 – Mount Carmel Borough incorporated.
- 1869 – Our Lady of Mount Carmel Roman Catholic Church is built.
- 1883, November 17 – Edison Electric Illuminating Company of Mount Carmel founded; identified by the Smithsonian Institution as the first isolated electrical generating plant in the world.
- 1888 – St. Matthew's Lutheran Church is built.
- 1894, November – Shamokin-Mount Carmel Electric Railway (trolley line) connecting Shamokin with Mount Carmel completed.
- 1896 – Reliance Colliery started by Thomas Baumgardner.
- 1906, April – Striking miners are shot by troopers of the State Constabulary; ten men injured, all survived.
- 1930 – The first viaduct constructed to eliminate grade crossings at two railroad tracks at the borough entrance.
- 1931 – Mount Carmel High School football stadium (the "Silver Bowl") opened, one of the first high school stadiums with lighting for night games.
- 1948, June 17 – United Airlines Flight 624 crashes near Midvalley Colliery No. 2, killing all 43 on board.
- 1950 – The coal mining boom begins its decline.
- 2003 – Original viaduct removed and a reconstructed version built by the Pennsylvania Department of Transportation.

== Geography ==
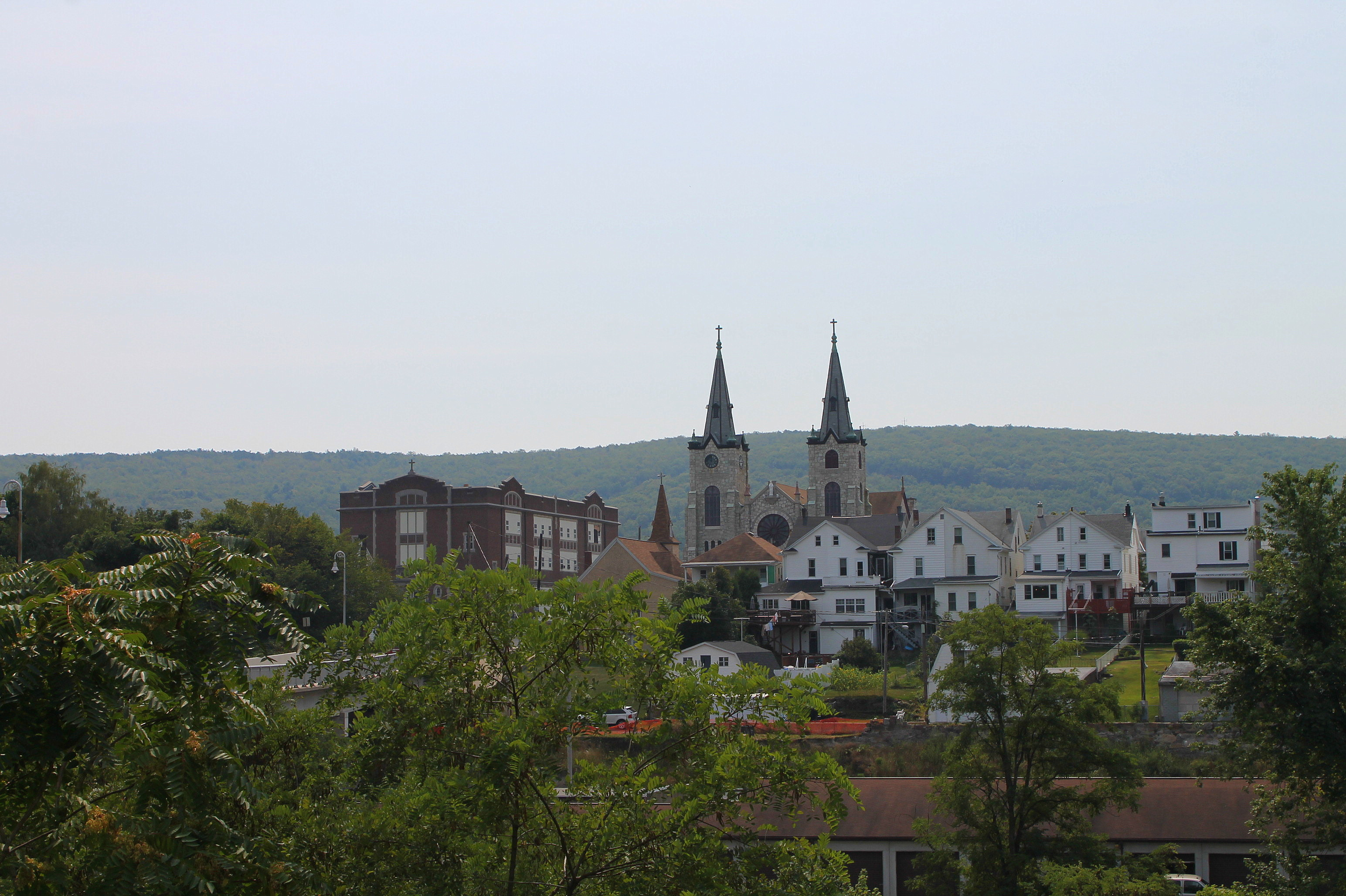
Buildings in Mount Carmel

Mount Carmel is located at 40°47′47″N 76°24′44″W in the ridge-and-valley zone of the central Appalachian Mountains. The borough is situated in a valley between Big Mountain to the south and Locust Mountain to the north, part of the Ridge-and-Valley physiographic province characteristic of the anthracite region's rugged topography. It is drained by Shamokin Creek and is part of the Lower Susquehanna watershed. According to the United States Census Bureau, the borough has a total area of 0.66 square miles (1.7 km^{2}), all land. Mount Carmel is served by Pennsylvania Route 61 and Pennsylvania Route 54.

== Demographics ==
Historical population
Census	Pop.	Note	%±
1870	1,289		—
1880	2,378		84.5%
1890	8,254		247.1%
1900	13,179		59.7%
1910	17,532		33.0%
1920	17,469		−0.4%
1930	17,967		2.9%
1940	17,780		−1.0%
1950	14,222		−20.0%
1960	10,760		−24.3%
1970	9,317		−13.4%
1980	8,190		−12.1%
1990	7,196		−12.1%
2000	6,390		−11.2%
2010	5,893		−7.8%
2020	5,725		−2.9%

As of the 2020 census, the population of Mount Carmel was 5,725, continuing a long decline from its peak of 17,967 in 1930. According to the 2019–2023 American Community Survey five-year estimates — which use a different methodology than the decennial census and may vary slightly in totals — the median household income was $52,667 and the per capita income was $27,065. Approximately 16.2% of residents lived below the poverty line. The racial composition of the borough was approximately 90.9% White, 4.6% Hispanic or Latino, and 2.8% two or more races. The median age was 42.5 years.

== Politics ==
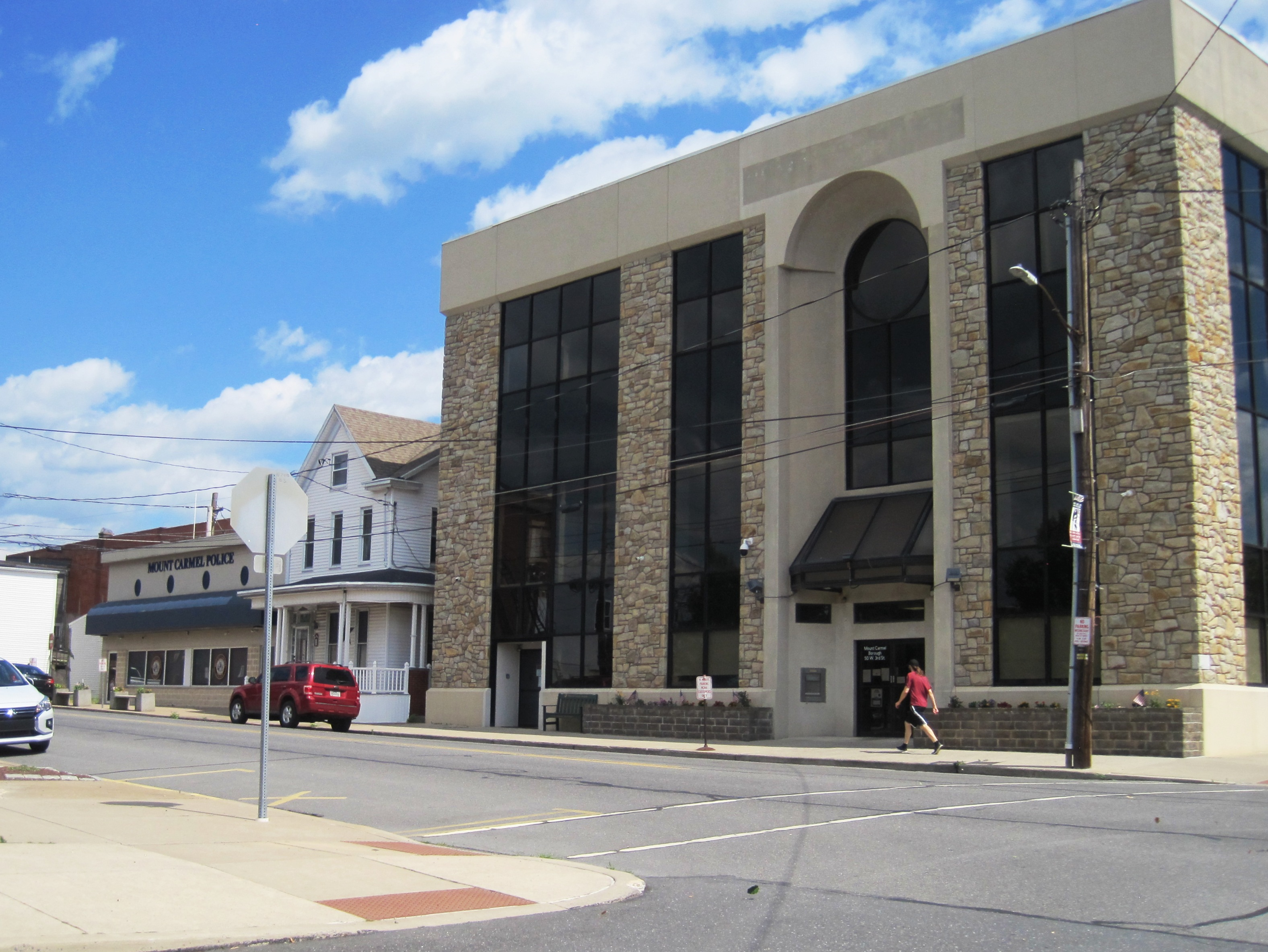
Mt. Carmel Borough Hall

=== Federal ===
United States Congress

- Pennsylvania's 9th congressional district

=== State ===
Pennsylvania General Assembly

- Pennsylvania Senate, District 27
- Pennsylvania House of Representatives, District 107

== Education ==
The Mount Carmel Area School District operates three schools serving the borough and surrounding township:

- Mount Carmel Area Elementary School (pre-K–6)
- Mount Carmel Area Junior High School (7–8)
- Mount Carmel Area High School (9–12)

== Transportation ==
=== Highways ===
- Pennsylvania Route 61, designated from 1963 to the present, previously known as the Centre Turnpike (1808–1911), Pennsylvania State Highway No. 161 (1911–1926), U.S. Route 120 (1926–1935), and U.S. Route 122 (1935–1963).
- Pennsylvania Route 54
- Pennsylvania Route 901

=== Railroads ===
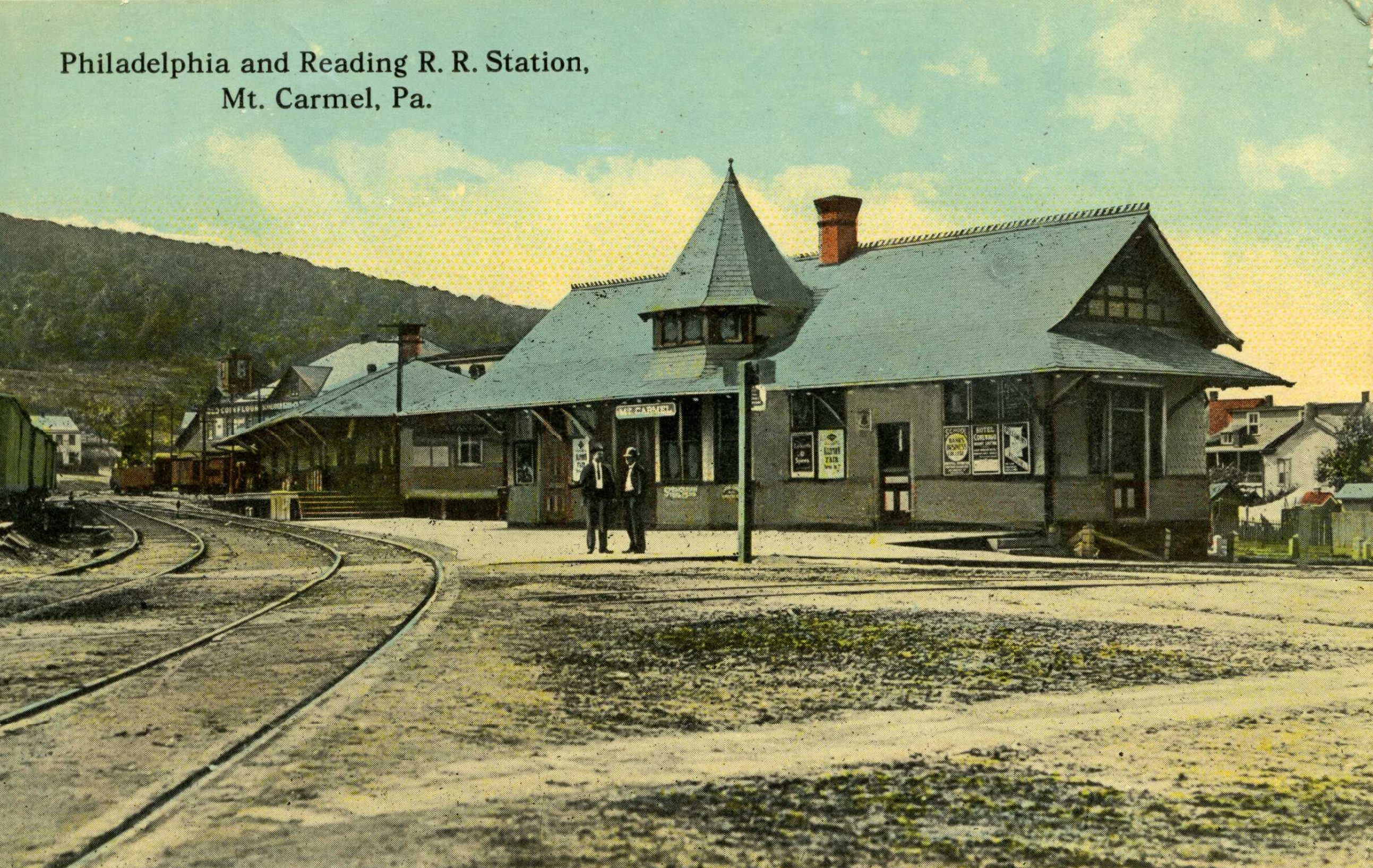
Philadelphia and Reading Railroad Station in Mount Carmel, c. 1917

Several railroads served Mount Carmel during the height of the coal era, including the Philadelphia and Reading Railroad (later the Reading Company), the Lehigh Valley Railroad, the Northern Central Railway, the Pennsylvania Railroad, and the Shamokin-Mount Carmel Electric Railway trolley line, which connected the borough to Shamokin beginning in November 1894.

=== Public transportation ===
The Lower Anthracite Transportation System provides bus service on weekdays and Saturdays, connecting Mount Carmel with Coal Township and surrounding communities. A seasonal route operates to Knoebels Amusement Resort.

== Notable people ==
- Ellen Dow — actress
- Lieutenant General James M. Gavin (1907–1990) — commanding general of the 82nd Airborne Division during World War II, known as "The Jumping General"
- Henry Hynoski Sr. — NFL running back for the Cleveland Browns (1975) and father of Henry Hynoski
- Edward Pinkowski — journalist and historian of Polish Americans
- Marie Powers — opera contralto who performed throughout Europe from the 1920s to 1940s before establishing herself on Broadway
- James M. Quigley — politician and lawyer
- Brett Veach — General Manager of the Kansas City Chiefs since 2017

== See also ==
- Philadelphia and Reading Coal and Iron Company
- Kulpmont, Pennsylvania
- Reliance Colliery
