= Scott Colliery =

- Interactive map of Scott Colliery
- 40.789136°N 76.47382°W
- Location: Kulpmont, Northumberland County, Pennsylvania

History
- Built: 1894–1898
- Demolished: mid-20th century

Site notes
- Owner: Susquehanna Coal Company (1894–1917); Susquehanna Collieries Company (1917–1922); M.A. Hanna Company (1922–c.1961)

The Scott Colliery was an anthracite coal mine located in Kulpmont, Northumberland County, Pennsylvania. The colliery played a direct role in founding the first residential settlement in Kulpmont and left a lasting environmental mark on the Shamokin Creek watershed through acid mine drainage. The Susquehanna Coal Company ran the colliery as a subsidiary of the Pennsylvania Railroad and the Pennsylvania Canal Company. It operated from the late 19th century until the mid-20th century, when falling demand for anthracite coal forced its closure.

== History ==
=== Discovery and development ===
Coal was first found in the channel of Quaker Run in 1790, in the area that would later become Kulpmont. Large-scale extraction did not begin until Isaac Tomlinson identified coal veins in the area.

The Susquehanna Coal Company incorporated in April 1867 as the Pittston Railroad and Coal Company, taking its final name in February 1869. The Pennsylvania Railroad and the Pennsylvania Canal Company held the company's stock, and the company controlled 5,823 acres of coal lands on both sides of the Susquehanna River. The Scott Colliery was one of seven mines the company ran in Northumberland County, alongside the Cameron, Luke Fidler, Hickory Ridge, Hickory Swamp, Pennsylvania, and Richards Collieries. Production figures, workforce counts, and accident records for all seven were published yearly in the Pennsylvania Annual Report of Mines, held at Penn State University Libraries in a continuous series from 1870 to 1979.

=== Construction ===
The first major phase of construction involved the Scott Branch of the Shamokin Valley and Pottsville Railroad, a 2.95-mile spur built in 1894 to reach the colliery. Workers sank the main hoisting shaft in 1898 using an African American labor force, whose families settled at the end of Poplar Street in company-built homes, forming the first residential community in what would become Kulpmont. The company then put up the Scott Breaker to crush and sort anthracite into commercial sizes. A 1918 engineering survey for the Susquehanna Collieries Company included fold-out plans for the Scott Colliery as part of its Shamokin Division records.

=== Workforce and community ===
In 1905, Kulpmont saw a building boom as immigrant families came to work in the mines. Early settlers were mainly Polish and Italian, followed by Hungarian, Irish, Russian, and Jewish families. Kulpmont incorporated as a borough on August 24, 1915. The Polish Club, Italian Club, Russian Club, and Hungarian Club were among the ethnic organizations that took root in the borough during this period.

=== Peak operation and corporate changes ===
In 1913, the Pennsylvania Railroad voluntarily sold its holdings in anthracite coal companies, including the Susquehanna Coal Company, while other anthracite railroads faced antitrust prosecution. In 1917, the Susquehanna Coal Company handed its mining properties to the newly formed Susquehanna Collieries Company and withdrew from mining. The new company electrified its collieries through the firm H.C. Felver, finishing the work in 1922. That same year, the M.A. Hanna Company, an Ohio holding company with interests in bituminous coal and iron, bought out the Susquehanna Collieries Company.

=== Decline and closure ===
Pennsylvania anthracite output peaked at roughly 100 million tons in 1917 and fell steadily after that. Oil and natural gas cut deeply into the home heating market that anthracite had long supplied. The Susquehanna Collieries Company's Pennsylvania mines wound down through the mid-20th century as demand dried up.

== Notable events ==
The Susquehanna Coal Company's Northumberland County mines were caught up in the anthracite coal strike of 1902. In September 1902, striking workers attacked a train carrying non-union men to the Richards and Pennsylvania Collieries. The Northumberland County sheriff called on Governor William A. Stone for help, and Stone sent the Fourth Regiment to the area. The Luke Fidler Colliery, run by the same company, was hit by two gas explosions: one in October 1894 killed five workers, and another in November 1902 killed four more.

== Environmental legacy ==
The worked-out chambers beneath Scott Ridge continue to leak acid mine drainage through the Scott Ridge Mine Tunnel. The United States Geological Survey tracks this discharge at station USGS-404739076291901, at 40°47′39″N, 76°29′19″W. That tunnel, along with three other mine discharges in the area, sends approximately 18.3 million gallons of polluted water per day into Shamokin Creek — roughly 40 percent of all impaired flow reaching the creek. The former colliery grounds were later redeveloped as the Kulpmont Veterans Memorial Sports Complex.

== See also ==
Alaska Colliery

Reliance Colliery

Sayre Colliery

Alaska, pennslyvania
