= Natalie, Pennsylvania =

Unincorporated community in Pennsylvania, US

Natalie
- Unincorporated area
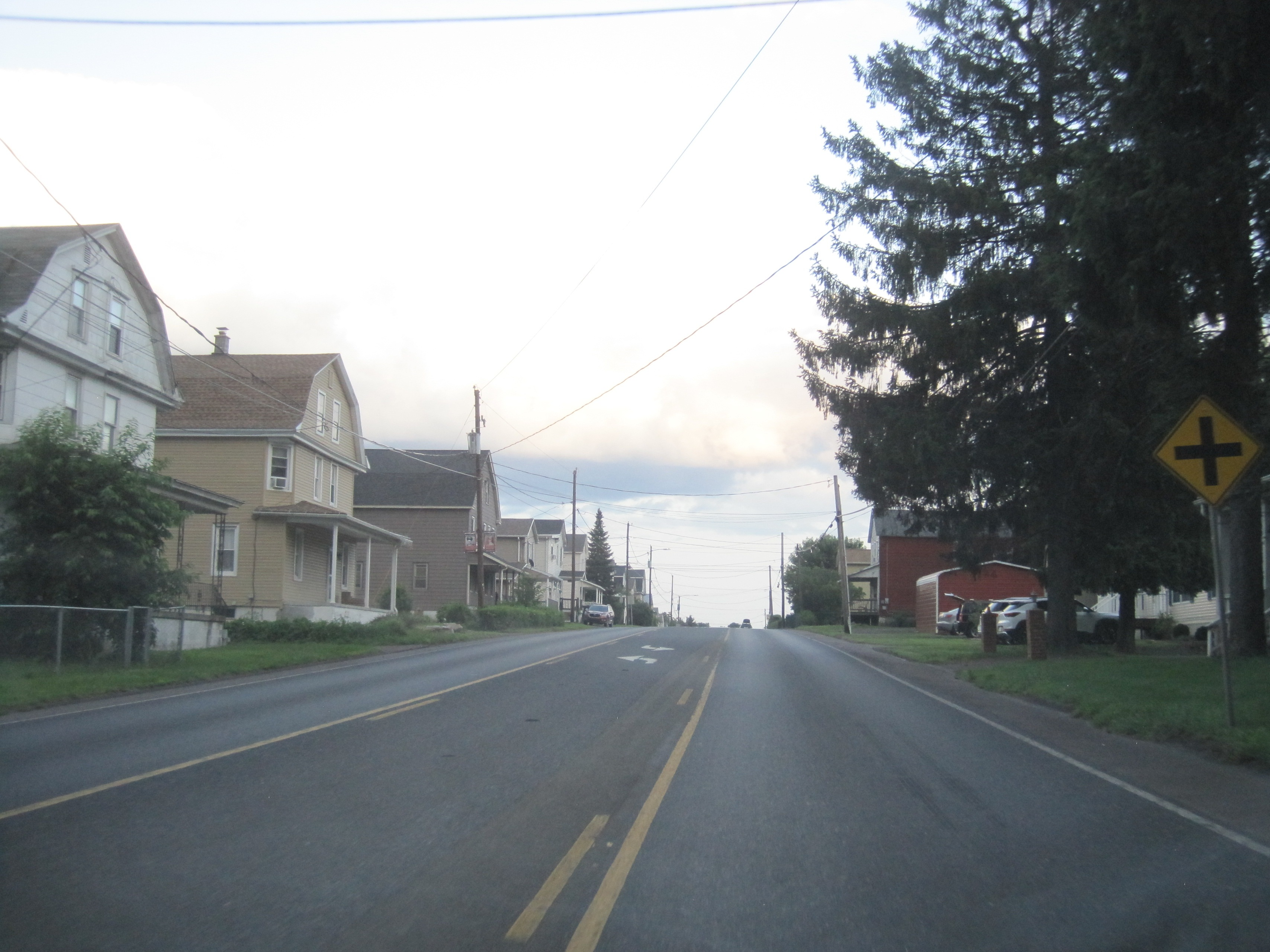
- Looking south through the village

- Location of Natalie in Pennsylvania
- Coordinates: 40°49′01″N 76°27′47″W
- Country: United States
- State: Pennsylvania
- County: Northumberland
- Townships: Mount Carmel Township
- Elevation: 1,532 ft (467 m)
- Time zone: UTC-5 (EST)
  - Summer (DST): UTC-4 (EDT)
- ZIP Code: 17851

Natalie is a town in Northumberland County, Pennsylvania, United States. It is classified as a "community designated place" (census class code U6) meaning it is neither a census-designated place nor a place having a federally recognized name.
