= Locust Gap, Pennsylvania =

Unincorporated community in Pennsylvania, US

Locust Gap
- Unincorporated community
- Location within the state of Pennsylvania Locust Gap (the United States)
- Coordinates: 40°46′18″N 76°26′30″W
- Country: United States
- State: Pennsylvania
- County: Northumberland

Area
  - Total: 9.18 sq mi (23.8 km^{2})
  - Land: 9.18 sq mi (23.8 km^{2})
  - Water: 0 sq mi (0.00 km^{2})
- Elevation: 1,191 ft (363 m)

Population (2000)
  - Total: 388
  - Density: 42.3/sq mi (16.3/km^{2})
- Time zone: UTC-5 (Eastern (EST))
  - Summer (DST): UTC-4 (EDT)
- ZIP code: 17840
- Area code: 570
- GNIS feature ID: 1179772

Locust Gap is an unincorporated community in Northumberland County, Pennsylvania, United States. It is located approximately two miles southwest of Mount Carmel.

== Geography ==
Locust Gap is located at an elevation of 1191 feet.

=== Major roads ===
- Pennsylvania Route 54
- Pennsylvania Route 901

== Demographics ==
Historical population
Census	Pop.	Note	%±

The United States Census Bureau defined Locust Gap as a census designated place (CDP) in 2023.
