= Kulpmont, Pennsylvania =

Borough in Pennsylvania, US

- Borough
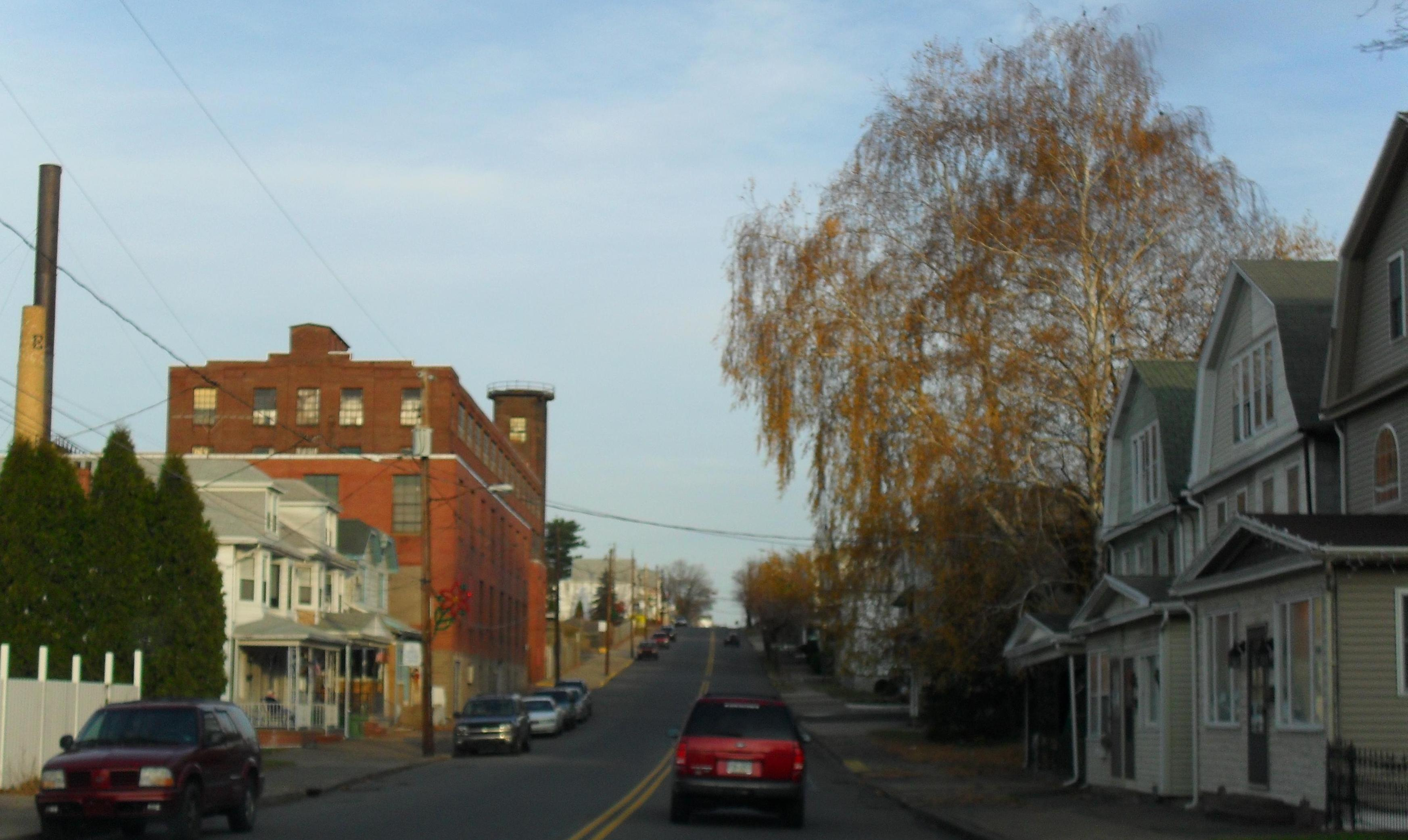
- West Chestnut Street in Kulpmont

- Location of Kulpmont in Northumberland County, Pennsylvania.

- Location on Kulpmont in Pennsylvania Kulpmont (the United States)
- Coordinates: 40°47′35″N 76°28′24″W
- Country: United States
- State: Pennsylvania
- County: Northumberland
- Incorporated: 1915

Government
  - Type: Borough Council
  - Mayor: Robert Slaby

Area
  - Total: 0.96 sq mi (2.48 km^{2})
  - Land: 0.96 sq mi (2.48 km^{2})
  - Water: 0 sq mi (0.00 km^{2})
- Elevation (center of borough): 1,100 ft (340 m)
- Highest elevation (northern boundary of borough): 1,280 ft (390 m)
- Lowest elevation (southern boundary at Quaker Run): 1,060 ft (320 m)

Population (2020)
  - Total: 2,758
  - Density: 2,876.1/sq mi (1,110.48/km^{2})
- Time zone: UTC-5 (Eastern (EST))
  - Summer (DST): UTC-4 (EDT)
- Zip code: 17834
- Area codes: 570 and 272
- FIPS code: 42-40584
- Website: Kulpmont

Kulpmont is a borough in Northumberland County, Pennsylvania, United States. The population was 2,758 at the 2020 census.

== History ==
The land that would become Kulpmont was originally part of expansive tracts held by major mining interests within the Western Middle Anthracite Field. Unlike many neighboring patch towns, which were built and strictly governed by a single coal company, Kulpmont developed as an open residential hub. This development was spearheaded by Monroe Henry Kulp, a prominent local businessman and U.S. Congressman who acquired the land to create a community for miners working at nearby facilities including the Scott Colliery and Sayre Colliery.

=== Incorporation and growth (1915–1930) ===
Kulpmont was officially incorporated as a borough on August 24, 1915, with its first council meeting held on January 3, 1916. Because of its central location between the larger centers of Mount Carmel and Shamokin, the borough experienced rapid population growth in the early 20th century. By 1920, the population had reached 4,695 residents, peaking a decade later in 1930 with 6,120 people.

The borough's layout was heavily influenced by the presence of the Pennsylvania Railroad and the Lehigh Valley Railroad, which maintained nearby lines to transport anthracite coal. This era marked the borough's peak as a commercial district, housing a diverse population of European immigrants who established various religious parishes that continue to characterize the town's architecture and cultural identity.

=== Economic diversification and post-mining era ===
As the coal industry faced fluctuations, Kulpmont diversified its economy by becoming a center for garment manufacturing. Several factories operated within the borough in the mid-20th century, providing employment that helped stabilize the community as deep mining began to decline.

Following the 1944 closure of deep mining at the neighboring Alaska Colliery, the region transitioned toward surface strip mining. This shift led to Kulpmont becoming a primarily residential community for workers in the service and regional manufacturing sectors. In 1963, the borough joined the Mount Carmel Area School District, ending the era of the local Kulpmont High School.

== Demographics ==
Historical population
Census	Pop.	Note	%±
1920	4,695		—
1930	6,120		30.4%
1940	6,159		0.6%
1950	5,199		−15.6%
1960	4,288		−17.5%
1970	4,026		−6.1%
1980	3,675		−8.7%
1990	3,233		−12.0%
2000	2,985		−7.7%
2010	2,924		−2.0%
2020	2,758		−5.7%

As of the census of 2000, there were 2,985 people, 1,338 households, and 837 families residing in the borough. The population density was 3,189.6 inhabitants per square mile (1,231.5/km^{2}). There were 1,532 housing units at an average density of 1,637.0 per square mile (632.0/km^{2}). The racial makeup of the borough was 98.89% White, 0.47% African American, 0.03% Asian, 0.23% from other races, and 0.37% from two or more races. Hispanic or Latino of any race were 0.54% of the population.

There were 1,338 households, out of which 22.6% had children under the age of 18 living with them, 49.5% were married couples living together, 9.5% had a female householder with no husband present, and 37.4% were non-families. 34.5% of all households were made up of individuals, and 20.0% had someone living alone who was 65 years of age or older. The average household size was 2.22 and the average family size was 2.85.

In the borough the population was spread out, with 19.6% under the age of 18, 5.7% from 18 to 24, 25.3% from 25 to 44, 24.1% from 45 to 64, and 25.3% who were 65 years of age or older. The median age was 45 years. For every 100 females, there were 92.1 males. For every 100 females age 18 and over, there were 87.1 males.

The median income for a household in the borough was $29,263, and the median income for a family was $34,674. Males had a median income of $26,679 versus $22,075 for females. The per capita income for the borough was $16,033. About 6.7% of families and 9.8% of the population were below the poverty line, including 11.0% of those under age 18 and 10.1% of those age 65 or over.

== Government ==
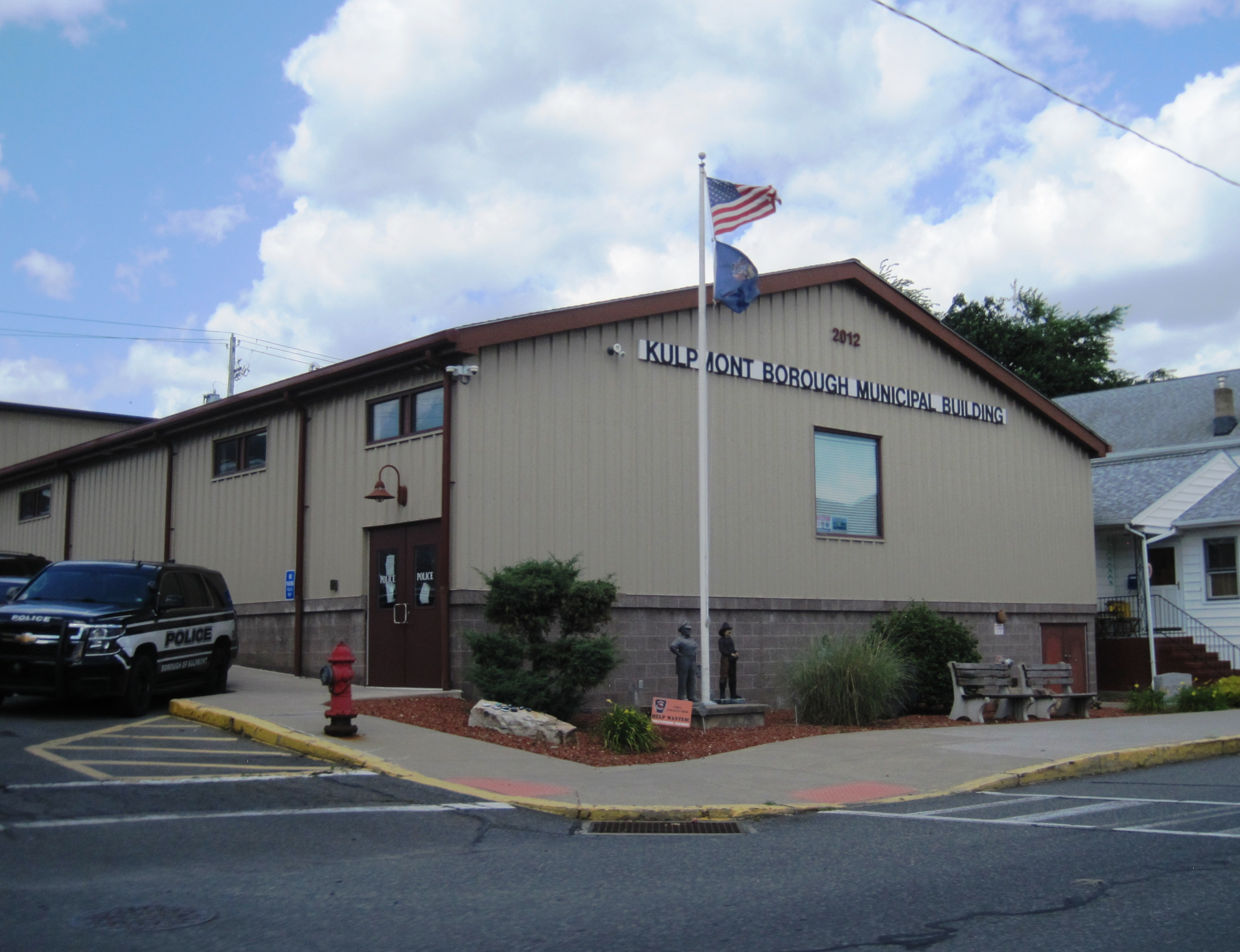
Kulpmont Borough Municipal Building

Kulpmont is served by a Mayor and 7 borough council members.

- Gregory Sacavage, Mayor
- Robert J. Fanella, Council President
- Marlin Hodge, Council Vice President
- Stephen Motyka
- Beth Gensemer
- Robert Chesney, Sr.
- Bernard P. Novakoski
- Mark A. Hine

== Education ==
It is in the Mount Carmel Area School District. This has been the case since 1963. Prior to 1963, borough residents attended Kulpmont High School, home of the Wildcats.

== Kulpmont 100 ==
The Kulpmont 100 is a 501 C Charitable organization recognized by the IRS and State of Pennsylvania. The organization was formed at the request of Borough Councilman Nick Bozza and resident Joseph Pancerella, to celebrate the 100th Anniversary of the borough's 2015 incorporation. (since incorporation). Since then, the Kulpmont 100 has continued to serve the community through civic events, borough beautification, erecting playgrounds, a dog park, improvements to the sports fields, purchasing holiday decorations, the purchase of memorial day banners, fundraising for Camp Dost (a pediatric oncology camp), and distributing scholarships for borough students attending college.

== Notable people ==
- Joe Baksi (1922-1977), top heavyweight boxing contender
- Bob Chesney, current head football coach at UCLA
- George Evans (1920–2001), commercial artist and illustrator whose work appeared in EC comics, Comics Illustrated, Boys' Life, and who wrote and illustrated the comic strip Secret Agent Corrigan
