= Reading Anthracite Company =

The logo of the Reading Anthracite Company

Reading Anthracite Company is a coal mining company based in Pottsville, Pennsylvania in the United States. It mainly mines anthracite coal in the Coal Region of eastern Pennsylvania.

== Reading Anthracite Company ==
Reading Anthracite Company is a privately held producer and processor of anthracite carbon headquartered in Pottsville, Pennsylvania, United States. The company is one of the largest anthracite producers in the country and operates an integrated network of surface mines, coal preparation plants, thermal coal-drying facilities, and logistics infrastructure across the Pennsylvania Anthracite Region.

Founded as part of the historic Philadelphia and Reading coal enterprise and acquired in 1961 by Italian-born industrialist John B. Rich, the company has remained under continuous family ownership for more than six decades and is currently operated under third- and fourth-generation management.

Reading Anthracite controls extensive anthracite reserves and supplies carbon products to domestic and international industrial markets, including steelmaking, ferroalloy and silicon production, filtration, energy generation, and specialty carbon applications.

The company’s operations include large-scale surface mining, coal cleaning, sizing, and drying, rail-served loading terminals, and access to Atlantic port facilities for export shipments. In addition to mining and processing, affiliated operations include waste-coal power generation and land reclamation and post-mining land use, including the development of recreational and energy facilities on restored mine lands.

== History ==
=== Origins in the Reading coal-and-rail system (1830s–1871) ===
The corporate lineage associated with Reading Anthracite traces to the Philadelphia and Reading Rail Road, chartered in 1833 to transport anthracite from Pennsylvania’s Coal Region to markets in Reading and Philadelphia via the Schuylkill Valley corridor. During the mid‑19th century, the Reading expanded its rail network and developed major tidewater coal‑handling infrastructure at Port Richmond in Philadelphia, enabling large‑scale domestic distribution and export of anthracite.

As anthracite became central to residential heating and industrial energy use in the northeastern United States, the Reading pursued a strategy of vertical integration, seeking not only to transport coal but also to control production and long‑term reserves through direct ownership of mining properties and collieries.

=== Formation of Philadelphia & Reading Coal & Iron and reserve accumulation (1871–early 1900s) ===
In 1871, these mining interests were formally organized under the Philadelphia & Reading Coal & Iron Company (often abbreviated P&R C&I). The new entity consolidated coal lands, collieries, and related industrial assets across the Anthracite Region and became one of the largest holders of anthracite reserves in the United States.

By the early 20th century, P&R’s coal estate had reached exceptional scale. In United States v. Reading Co. (1920), the U.S. Supreme Court described the company’s holdings as totaling approximately 91,149 acres (142 square miles) of coal lands, representing a significant share of the anthracite fields in eastern Pennsylvania.

=== Labor, regulation, and corporate reorganization (late 1800s–1956) ===
The Reading system’s integrated coal‑and‑rail structure developed during a period of intense labor conflict and increasing federal regulation of railroads and mineral monopolies. Antitrust policy and Interstate Commerce Commission oversight gradually reshaped the permissible relationship between transportation networks and resource ownership.

Following financial reorganizations in the late 19th century, a Reading Company holding structure was established in 1896 to consolidate the railroad and coal subsidiaries. Through the first half of the 20th century, the coal business remained a core asset within the broader Reading corporate family, even as long‑term demand patterns for anthracite began to change.

By the mid‑1950s, the parent enterprise had reorganized as a diversified holding company known as Philadelphia & Reading Corporation, with anthracite operations held through subsidiary entities.

=== 1956–1958: Consolidation of coal assets within Reading Anthracite ===
Federal tax court records document a major internal restructuring of the coal business during this period. Beginning January 1, 1956, Reading Anthracite Company functioned as the operating subsidiary responsible for mining, processing, marketing, and distribution, performing these services for the parent corporation under a contractual fee arrangement.

On January 1, 1958, Philadelphia & Reading Corporation transferred substantially all properties connected with its coal business—including mining lands, preparation facilities, and related assets—to Reading Anthracite Company in exchange for 7,000 shares of common stock and $10 million in secured securities, while retaining more than 99 percent ownership.

=== Investment control and the Graham–Newman period ===
During the mid‑1950s, Philadelphia & Reading Corporation came under the influence of the Graham–Newman Partnership, the investment firm associated with Benjamin Graham and a young Warren Buffett. Contemporary financial reporting and later biographical accounts describe the company as an asset‑rich, cash‑generating enterprise with extensive anthracite landholdings and favorable tax attributes.

=== 1961: Acquisition by John B. Rich and transition to family ownership ===
In 1961, Philadelphia & Reading Corporation divested its anthracite operations, selling Reading Anthracite Company to John B. Rich, an Italian‑born industrialist whose life became closely associated with the modern history of the company and the Anthracite Region.

Rich was born in Italy and emigrated to the United States at the age of 13, settling in Pennsylvania’s coal fields. Like many immigrants of the early 20th century, he entered the workforce at a young age, initially working underground as a miner. He later established himself as a rock and excavation contractor, gaining experience in drilling, blasting, quarrying, and large‑scale earthmoving.

Through decades of involvement in mining and heavy construction, Rich developed extensive operational and commercial knowledge of the anthracite industry. His progression—from immigrant laborer to contractor and ultimately to owner of Reading Anthracite—marked a significant transition of the company from railroad‑affiliated and institutional ownership to long‑term private family stewardship.

John B. Rich remained actively involved in the company and affiliated enterprises until his death in 1978. In recognition of his contributions to the regional coal and energy industries, the John B. Rich Memorial Power Station in Gilberton, Pennsylvania, operated by Gilberton Power Company, was named in his honor.

=== Third‑ and fourth‑generation leadership ===
Following John B. Rich’s tenure, leadership passed to his son, John “Jack” W. Rich, and subsequently to later generations of the Rich family. Reading Anthracite has since been operated under third‑ and fourth‑generation family management, maintaining continuous private ownership and strategic direction for more than six decades since the 1961 acquisition.

=== Modern era ===
From the late 20th century into the 21st century, Reading Anthracite has remained one of the largest fully integrated anthracite producers in the United States, controlling reserves, mining operations, preparation plants, and logistics infrastructure. Operations continue under oversight by the Mine Safety and Health Administration and the Pennsylvania Department of Environmental Protection, with ongoing permitting, safety reporting, environmental compliance, and land reclamation.

Reclaimed lands have supported secondary uses, including the development of Famous Reading Outdoors, an off‑road recreation area established on restored mine property.

== Operations ==
=== Mining ===
Reading Anthracite operates a network of large-scale surface mines across the Pennsylvania Anthracite Region, primarily within Schuylkill, Northumberland, and surrounding counties. Mining is conducted using open-pit and highwall methods to extract anthracite from multiple coal seams within the Southern and Western Middle Anthracite Fields. Operations include overburden removal, drilling, blasting, loading, and hauling using truck-and-shovel and dozer-supported mining systems.

=== Processing and Preparation ===
Run-of-mine material is processed at multiple coal preparation and sizing plants, where it is crushed, screened, washed, and separated to meet customer specifications for ash content, sizing, and carbon quality. Preparation circuits utilize dense media separation, screening, and fine-coal recovery systems to produce a range of commercial size fractions.

=== Coal Drying ===
The company operates thermal coal-drying facilities to reduce inherent and surface moisture in washed anthracite products. Drying improves handling characteristics, sizing stability, and suitability for metallurgical, filtration, and specialty industrial applications requiring low and consistent moisture content.

=== Quality Control and Blending ===
Product quality is managed through laboratory analysis, plant sampling, and controlled blending of material from multiple seams and preparation circuits. Specifications for fixed carbon, ash, volatile matter, sizing, and moisture are monitored to meet contractual and industry standards.

=== Logistics and Transportation ===
Finished products are shipped via rail, truck, and port facilities, with access to Class I railroads and Atlantic Coast export terminals. Rail-served loadouts support unit-train and manifest shipments, while port access enables ocean vessel loading for international customers.

=== Reclamation and Land Management ===
Surface mining operations are conducted under state and federal permits requiring progressive reclamation. Activities include regrading, soil replacement, replanting with native vegetation, water management, and post-mining land use development. Reclaimed properties include industrial sites, energy facilities, and recreational developments, including the Famous Reading Outdoors off-road recreation area established on restored mine lands.

== Markets and Uses ==
Reading Anthracite supplies anthracite carbon to domestic and international industrial markets and does not focus on residential or consumer heating uses. The company’s primary demand is concentrated in metallurgical and high-temperature industrial applications.

=== Steelmaking ===
Anthracite carbon is used in electric arc furnace (EAF) steelmaking as a carbon additive and slag-conditioning agent. Its high fixed carbon content and low volatile matter make it suitable for carbon injection, melt chemistry control, and protection of furnace linings. Anthracite is utilized as a substitute or supplement to metallurgical coke in specific steelmaking processes.

=== Titanium Dioxide (TiO₂) Production ===
Anthracite is used as a reductant in the production of titanium dioxide, particularly in chloride-process operations that require high-purity carbon inputs. Its low impurity levels and consistent chemistry support process stability and product quality in pigment manufacturing.

=== Ferroalloys and Silicon ===
The company supplies anthracite carbon for use in ferroalloy and silicon metal production, where it serves as a reducing agent in submerged arc furnace operations. Anthracite is valued in these applications for its predictable reactivity, high carbon content, and low volatile matter.

=== Energy and Industrial Applications ===
Anthracite products are also used in industrial boilers, cogeneration facilities, and waste-coal power generation, where high energy density and stable combustion characteristics are required. These applications are industrial in nature and distinct from residential heating markets.

=== Export Markets ===
Reading Anthracite supplies customers in North America and international markets, with shipments moving through Atlantic Coast ports to destinations in Europe, South America, and Asia. Export demand is primarily tied to metallurgical, titanium dioxide, and ferroalloy production rather than residential or consumer uses.

== Products ==
Reading Anthracite produces a range of sized and specification-controlled anthracite carbon products for industrial, metallurgical, energy, and filtration applications.

=== Sized Anthracite Products ===
Anthracite is processed and classified into standardized size ranges through crushing, screening, and sizing operations. Common commercial size categories include stove, nut, pea, buckwheat, rice, and fines, as well as custom size blends produced to meet specific customer requirements.

Sizing consistency is maintained to support handling, combustion, and process performance requirements across industrial applications.

=== Carbon Specifications ===
Products are supplied to defined specifications for fixed carbon, ash content, volatile matter, sulfur, and moisture. Quality targets vary by application and are controlled through preparation plant processing, blending of material from multiple seams, and laboratory verification.

Anthracite supplied by the company is characterized by high fixed carbon content and low volatile matter relative to other coal ranks, making it suitable for metallurgical and specialty industrial uses.

=== Dried Anthracite ===
Thermally dried anthracite products are produced to reduce inherent and surface moisture following washing and preparation. Drying improves product stability, storage characteristics, and suitability for applications requiring low and consistent moisture levels.

=== Custom Blends and Industrial Grades ===
In addition to standard commercial sizes, Reading Anthracite produces custom blends and industrial grades tailored to customer process requirements. These products may involve controlled size distributions, moisture targets, or chemistry specifications designed for metallurgical, filtration, chemical, and energy-related applications.

== Environmental Management and Reclamation ==
Reading Anthracite conducts surface mining and processing operations under federal and state environmental and mining regulations, including oversight by the Pennsylvania Department of Environmental Protection (PA DEP), the Mine Safety and Health Administration (MSHA), and applicable federal agencies. Environmental management emphasizes regulatory compliance, land restoration, and long-term post-mining land use.

=== Regulatory Framework ===
Surface mining activities are permitted and regulated under Pennsylvania’s mining and reclamation programs, which implement federal standards established by the Surface Mining Control and Reclamation Act (SMCRA). Permits require detailed mine plans, bonding, water management controls, and reclamation schedules prior to approval.

=== Reclamation Practices ===
Reclamation activities are conducted concurrently with mining where practicable and include regrading disturbed land to stable contours, replacing soil materials, establishing drainage controls, and replanting with native or approved vegetation. These practices are intended to stabilize landforms, reduce erosion, and support long-term ecological recovery following mining activities.

=== Water Management and Environmental Controls ===
Mining and processing operations incorporate water management systems designed to control runoff, sedimentation, and discharge quality. Sedimentation ponds, diversion channels, and treatment systems are employed to meet state and federal water quality requirements and to mitigate impacts to surrounding watersheds.

=== Post-Mining Land Use and Commercial Development ===
Reclaimed properties are returned to productive use consistent with approved post-mining land use plans. These uses include industrial and commercial development, energy infrastructure, transportation and logistics facilities, and recreational uses. Commercial redevelopment of reclaimed mine lands supports regional economic activity by enabling new industrial sites, distribution facilities, and energy-related projects on previously disturbed property.

One example of post-mining land reuse is the development of the Famous Reading Outdoors off-road recreation area, which operates on restored mine lands under state permitting requirements.

=== Waste Coal Utilization ===
Environmental remediation efforts also include the recovery and utilization of historic waste coal deposits. The removal and consumption of legacy coal refuse piles supports land restoration, reduces acid mine drainage risk, and enables productive reuse of previously disturbed lands, including energy generation and commercial facilities.

== Archives and records ==
- Philadelphia and Reading Coal and Iron Company photograph albums at Baker Library Special Collections, Harvard Business School.
