= Quaker Run (Shamokin Creek tributary) =

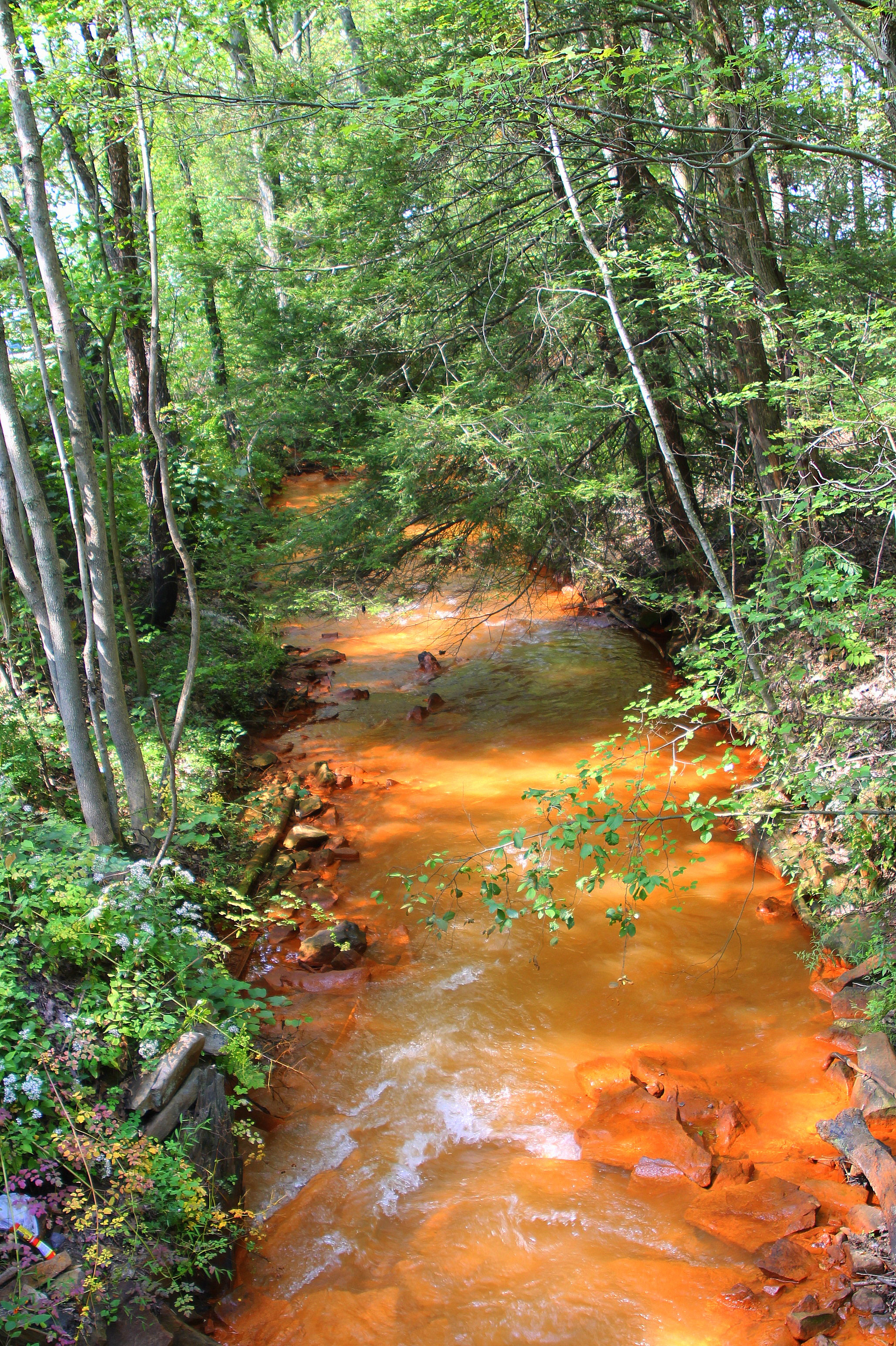
- Quaker Run looking downstream in Ranshaw
- Etymology: Isaac Tomlinson, a member of the Society of Friends

Physical characteristics
- Source
  - location: near Pennsylvania Route 61 in Kulpmont, Northumberland County, Pennsylvania
  - elevation: between 1,100 and 1,120 feet (335 and 341 m)
- Mouth
  - location: Shamokin Creek in Coal Township, Northumberland County, Pennsylvania
  - coordinates: 40°47′02″N 76°31′22″W
  - elevation: 830 ft (250 m)
- Length: 3.7 mi (6.0 km)
- Basin size: 3.62 mi^{2} (9.4 km^{2})

Basin features
- Progression: Shamokin Creek → Susquehanna River → Chesapeake Bay
- Tributaries
  - right: one unnamed tributary

Quaker Run is a tributary of Shamokin Creek in Northumberland County, Pennsylvania, in the United States. It is approximately 3.7 miles (6.0 km) long and flows through Kulpmont, Mount Carmel Township, and Coal Township. The watershed of the stream has an area of 3.62 square miles (9.4 km^{2}). The stream has one unnamed tributary. Quaker Run is designated as an impaired waterbody due to metals from abandoned mine drainage. Raw sewage and stormwater have also been discharged into it at times.

The channel of Quaker Run is flanked by walls in some reaches. Iron precipitate is also caked thickly along the stream. However, a restoration project has restored part of the stream channel and constructed wetlands. The stream was one of the first places in the Southern and Middle Coal Fields of Pennsylvania where anthracite coal was discovered. A few bridges have also been constructed across the stream. The stream's watershed is designated as a coldwater and migratory fishery. It used to have much fish life, but as of 1999, it had none.

== Course ==
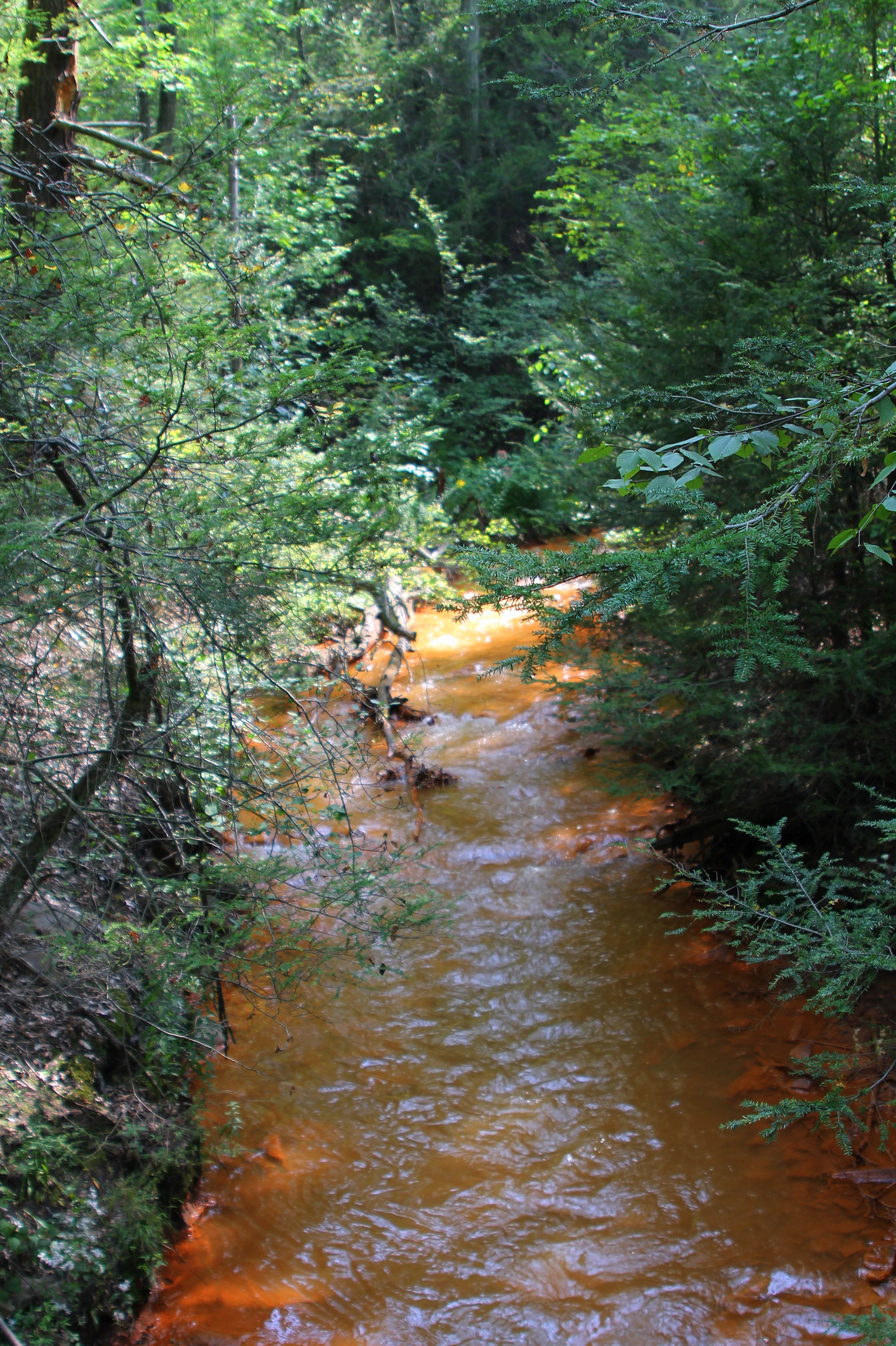
Quaker Run looking upstream in Ranshaw

Quaker Run begins near Pennsylvania Route 61 in Kulpmont. It flows southwest for a short distance and crosses Pennsylvania Route 61 before turning west-southwest for more than a mile and entering Mount Carmel Township and a valley. The stream then turns in a westerly direction for a few miles, entering Coal Township and then the census-designated place of Ranshaw. In Ranshaw, it crosses Pennsylvania Route 901 and reaches its confluence with Shamokin Creek.

Quaker Run joins Shamokin Creek 24.68 miles (39.72 km) upstream of its mouth.

=== Tributaries ===
Quaker Run has no named tributaries, but it does have one unnamed tributary. This tributary is designated as impaired. This stream is locally known as "Dark Run".

== Hydrology ==
The entirety of Quaker Run is designated as impaired due to metals and siltation from abandoned mine drainage.

Water from the Mid Valley Discharge in the North Branch Shamokin Creek watershed disappears into a mine pool due to infiltration and reappears in the watershed of Quaker Run. The Scott Ridge Mine Tunnel Discharge is in the watershed of Quaker Run, as are the Colbert Mine Breach Discharge and the Maysville Mine Borehole Discharge. Most of the stream's flow comes from these three discharges. However, it also receives flow from the Borough of Kulpmont Wastewater Treatment Plant. Wal-Mart Stores Inc. has an NPDES permit to discharge stormwater into the stream in Coal Township. Raw sewage has at times been discharged into the stream. In the 1980s, its waters were noted to have an odor.

The water temperature of Quaker Run in 1999 and 2000 ranged from 11 to 14.5 °C (51.8 to 58.1 °F) at Ranshaw and was 13.5 °C (56.3 °F) near Kulpmont. The discharge of the stream ranged from 5 to 22 cubic feet per second (0.14 to 0.62 m^{3}/s) at Ranshaw, with an average of roughly 13 cubic feet per second (0.37 m^{3}/s), while the specific conductance ranged from 476 to 623 micro-siemens per centimeter at 25 °C (77 °F). Near Kulpmont, the discharge was 2 cubic feet per second (0.057 m^{3}/s) and the specific conductance was 619 micro-siemens per centimeter at 25 °C (77 °F). The pH of the stream was 6.2 near Kulpmont and 6.3 to 6.8 at Ranshaw. The water hardness at these two sites was 164 to 262 milligrams per liter (0.164 to 0.262 oz/cu ft) and 252 milligrams per liter (0.252 oz/cu ft), respectively. The turbidity was 22 to 43 Nephelometric Turbidity Units at Ranshaw and 34 Nephelometric Turbidity Unit near Kulpmont.

The concentration of dissolved oxygen in Quaker Run was 8.8 to 10.0 milligrams per liter (0.0088 to 0.0100 oz/cu ft) at Ranshaw and 9.8 milligrams per liter (0.0098 oz/cu ft) near Kulpmont. The carbon dioxide and nitrogen concentrations were 12 to 15 milligrams per liter (0.012 to 0.015 oz/cu ft) and 0.98 milligrams per liter (0.00098 oz/cu ft) at Ranshaw and 1.2 milligrams per liter (0.0012 oz/cu ft) and 0.63 milligrams per liter (0.00063 oz/cu ft) near Kulpmont. The concentration of phosphorus in the stream at Ranshaw was 0.05 milligrams per liter (5.0×10^{−5} oz/cu ft). The concentrations of silica and chloride near Kulpmont were 12 milligrams per liter (0.012 oz/cu ft), while the sulfate concentration was 260 milligrams per liter (0.26 oz/cu ft). At Ranshaw, the silica concentration was 12 to 14 milligrams per liter (0.012 to 0.014 oz/cu ft), the sulfate concentration was 190 to 251 milligrams per liter (0.190 to 0.251 oz/cu ft), and the chloride concentration was 11 to 13.3 milligrams per liter (0.0110 to 0.0133 oz/cu ft).

The concentrations of sodium and potassium in the filtered water of Quaker Run at Ranshaw were 8 to 8.47 milligrams per liter (0.00799 to 0.00846 oz/cu ft) and 2.61 milligrams per liter (0.00261 oz/cu ft). The concentration of sodium near Kulpmont was 7.9 milligrams per liter (0.0079 oz/cu ft). The concentrations of magnesium and calcium at Ranshaw were 24 to 34 milligrams per liter (0.024 to 0.034 oz/cu ft) and 26 to 49 milligrams per liter (0.026 to 0.049 oz/cu ft). Near Kulpmont, the concentrations of these metals were 34 and 45 milligrams per liter (0.034 and 0.045 oz/cu ft), respectively. The iron concentration was 14 to 18.8 milligrams per liter (0.0140 to 0.0188 oz/cu ft) at Ranshaw and 22 milligrams per liter (0.022 oz/cu ft) near Kulpmont. The manganese concentration was 2.6 to 3.4 milligrams per liter (0.0026 to 0.0034 oz/cu ft) at Ranshaw and 3.6 milligrams per liter (0.0036 oz/cu ft) near Kulpmont. The aluminum concentration at these locations was less than 20 to 200 micrograms per liter and 22 micrograms per liter, respectively.

== Geography, geology, and watershed ==
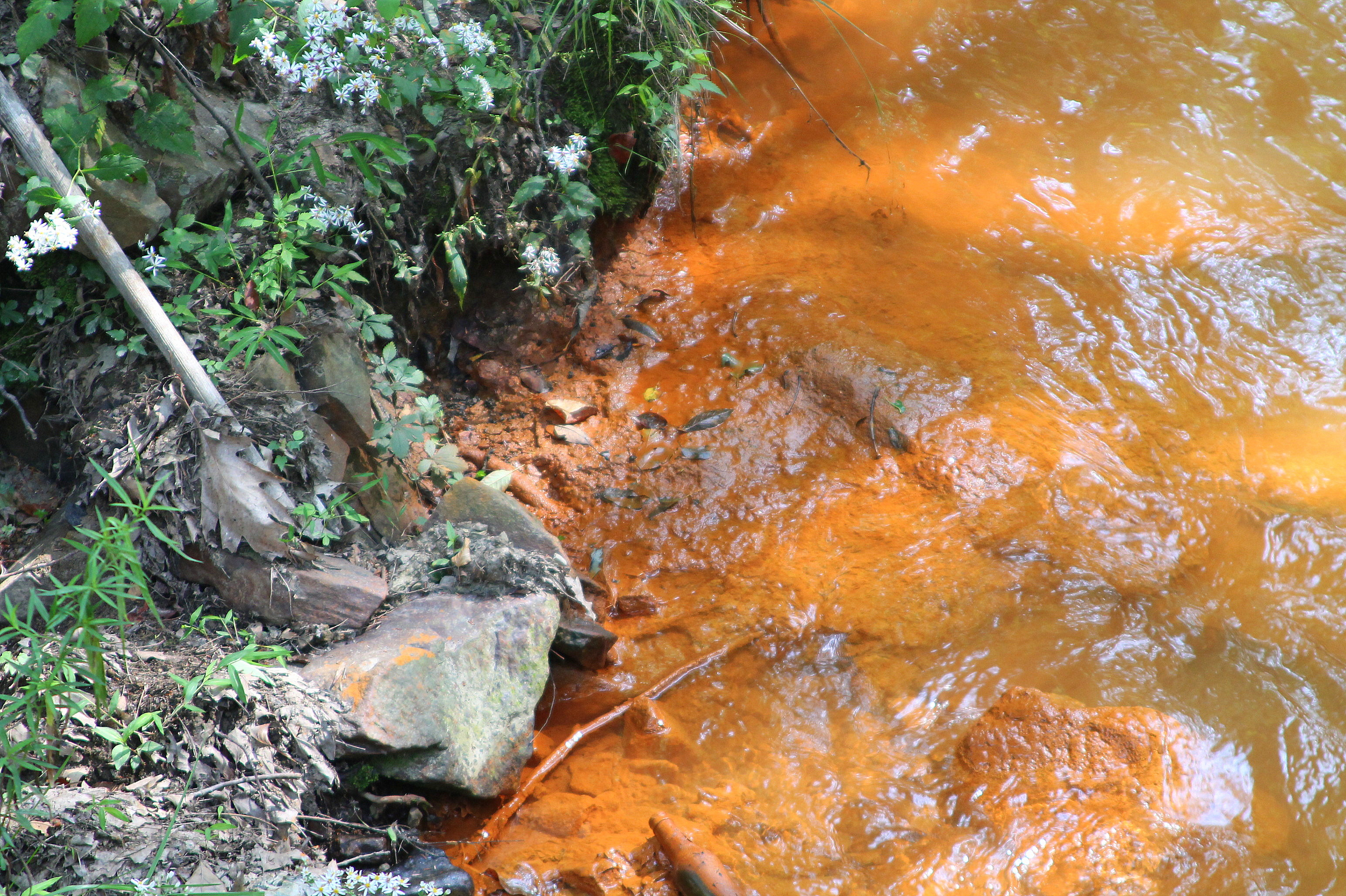
Iron precipitate on Quaker Run

The elevation near the mouth of Quaker Run is 830 feet (250 m) above sea level. The elevation of the stream's source is between 1,100 and 1,120 feet (335 and 341 m) above sea level.

Quaker Run has a thick layering of iron precipitate along its length. The layering is more thick and solidly packed than in some other nearby streams. Historically, there was a quarry near the stream. Mine complexes also extend under the stream.

The channel of Quaker Run is flanked by walls in Ranshaw. These walls are in a state of disrepair.

The watershed of Quaker Run has an area of 3.62 square miles (9.4 km^{2}). The mouth of the stream is in the United States Geological Survey quadrangle of Shamokin. However, its source is in the quadrangle of Mount Carmel.

The Wildlife for Everyone Endowment Foundation has carried out a restoration project on Quaker Run in Coal Township. This project has restored 2,000 feet (610 m) of stream and created 3 acres (1.2 ha) of wetlands. The community of Marion Heights is in the vicinity of the stream's headwaters.

== History and recreation ==
Quaker Run was entered into the Geographic Names Information System on August 2, 1979. Its identifier in the Geographic Names Information System is 1184526.

In 1790, Isaac Tomlinson discovered black stones in Quaker Run, which flowed through his property. He discovered that it was possible to burn the stones, making him one of the first people to discover anthracite coal in the Southern and Middle Coal Fields of Pennsylvania. The stream is named after the fact that Tomlinson was a member of the Society of Friends.

Coal was later mined in the vicinity of Quaker Run by Isaac Tomlinson in 1810. Coal was also mined near the stream by John Thompson, the area's first mine operator. In the early 1900s, there were several cases for pollution in the stream.

Two concrete stringer/multi-beam or girder bridges were built over Quaker Run in 1913. One is 23.0 feet (7.0 m) long and carries State Route 2019 in Ranshaw. The other is the same length and carries the same road.

In the 1980s, a recreation area was established in a former area of stripping pits along Quaker Run. The recreational area included a baseball field and a jogging track. The 1st Annual Banks Cleanup was conducted along the stream and Shamokin Creek in May 1997. In 2014, $500,000 in grants was procured to repair the stream's channel. The Northumberland County Conservation District has also received a $79,000 Growing Greener grant to carry out a feasibility study for restoring the stream. Quaker Run, along with several other local streams, experienced significant stream channel damage during flooding in September 2011. A flood control project for the stream is scheduled to begin in 2016, with new channel walls being planned for April of that year.

== Biology ==
The drainage basin of Quaker Run is designated as a Coldwater Fishery and a Migratory Fishery. Some time ago, in around 1840, the stream was "filled with trout". However, in 1999, there were no fish of any kind in the stream.

== See also ==
- Coal Run (Shamokin Creek), next tributary of Shamokin Creek going downstream
- Locust Creek (Shamokin Creek), next tributary of Shamokin Creek going upstream
- List of rivers of Pennsylvania
- List of tributaries of Shamokin Creek
