= Edgewood, Pennsylvania =

Edgewood is the name of some places in the U.S. state of Pennsylvania:

- Edgewood, Allegheny County, Pennsylvania
- Edgewood, Northumberland County, Pennsylvania
