= Mount Carmel Area School District =

School district in Pennsylvania, U.S.

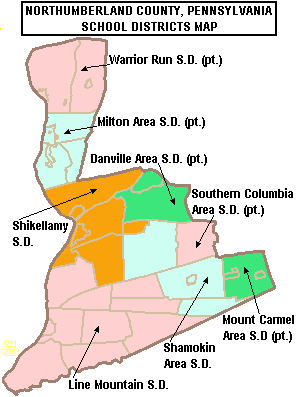
- Shows a portion of Mount Carmel ASD

Address
- 600 West 5th Street Mount Carmel, Northumberland County, Columbia County, Pennsylvania, 17851; United States

District information
- Type: Public

Students and staff
- Colors: Red and white

Other information
- Website: www.mca.k12.pa.us

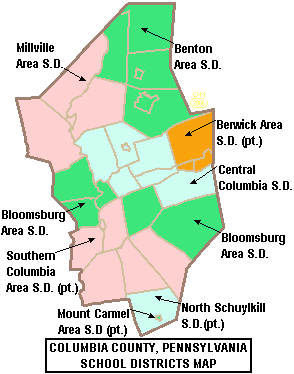
School District regions in Columbia County

Mount Carmel Area School District is a small, rural, public school district in Northumberland County, Pennsylvania. The district is one of the 500 public school districts of Pennsylvania. It serves Mount Carmel, Kulpmont, Marion Heights, and Mount Carmel Township in Northumberland County, as well as the borough of Centralia in Columbia County. The Mount Carmel Area School District encompasses approximately 24 square miles (62 km^{2}). According to 2000 local census data, it served a resident population of 12,815. By 2010, the district's population declined to 12,555 people. The educational attainment levels for the school district population (25 years old and over) were 85.3% high school graduates and 14.3% college graduates.

According to the Pennsylvania Budget and Policy Center, 69.2% of the district's pupils lived at or below the Federal Poverty level as shown by their eligibility for the federal free or reduced price school meal programs in 2012. In 2009, Mount Carmel Area School District residents' per capita income was $15,294, while the median family income was $35,239. In Northumberland County, the median household income was $38,397. In the Commonwealth, the median family income was $49,501 and the United States median family income was $49,445, in 2010. By 2013, the median household income in the United States rose to $52,100.

Mount Carmel Area School District operates two schools: Mount Carmel Area Elementary School, and Mount Carmel Area High School. The district also provides taxpayer funded, full-day preschool for 4-year-olds. In 2015, more than 51 Mount Carmel Area pupils attend full-time cyber school. The district does not offer its own cyber school program. The pupils attend any of the 13 cyber schools operating in Pennsylvania in 2015, including locally operated SusQ Cyber Charter School.

Mount Carmel Area High School students may choose to attend Northumberland County Career Technology Center for training in the building trades, culinary arts and cosmetology as well as other careers. The Central Susquehanna Intermediate Unit CSIU16 provides the district with a wide variety of services like specialized education for disabled students and hearing, speech and visual disability services and professional development for staff and faculty.

== Extracurriculars ==
Mount Carmel Area School District offers a variety of clubs, activities and an extensive sports program. The Mount Carmel Area School District is a Division I member of the Pennsylvania Heartland Athletic Conference. The Pennsylvania Heartland Athletic Conference is a voluntary association of 25 PIAA High Schools within the central Pennsylvania region.

Mount Carmel Area School District operates an indoor pool which it rents to the general public for pool parties.

=== Sports ===
The district funds:

Boys

- Baseball – AAA
- Basketball- AAAA
- Cross country – Class AA
- Football – AAA
- Indoor Track and Field – AAAA
- Swimming and diving – AA
- Track and field – AA
- Wrestling – AA

Girls

- Basketball – AAA
- Competitive Spirit – AA
- Cross country – AA
- Indoor Track and field – AAAA
- Soccer – AA
- Swimming and diving – AA
- Track and field – AA

Junior high school sports

Boys

- Basketball
- Cross country
- Football
- Track and field
- Wrestling

Girls

- Basketball
- Cross country
- Softball
- Track and field

- According to PIAA directory July 2012 Updated according to PIAA directory July 2014, and then July 2024.
