= Marshallton =

Marshallton may refer to:

- Marshallton, Chester County, Pennsylvania
- Marshallton, Delaware
- Marshallton, Northumberland County, Pennsylvania
