= Fairview-Ferndale, Pennsylvania =

Unincorporated community in Pennsylvania, US

Fairview-Ferndale
- Census-designated place
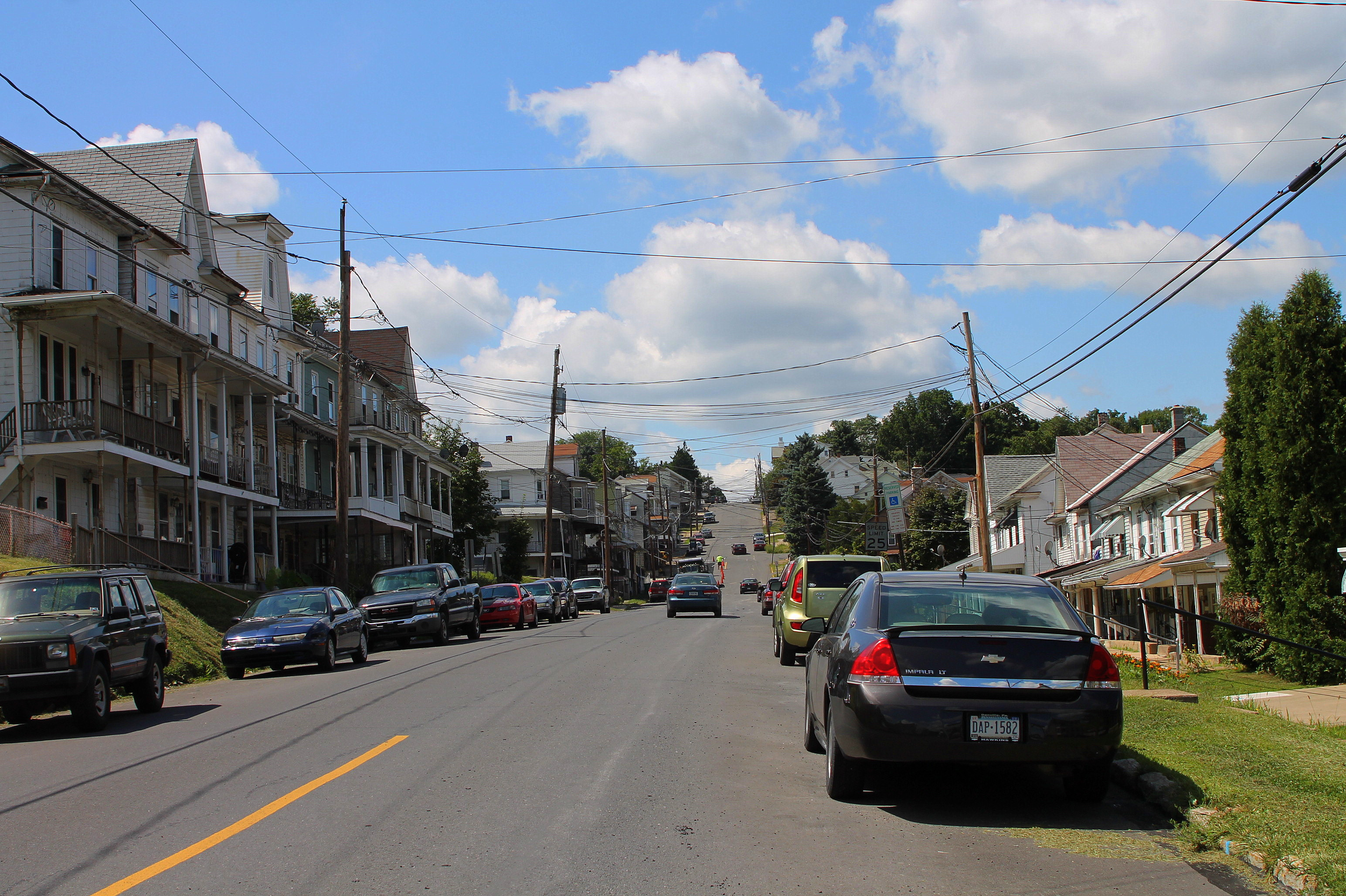
- Street in Fairview-Ferndale

- Location within the U.S. state of Pennsylvania Fairview-Ferndale (the United States)
- Coordinates: 40°46′59″N 76°34′22″W
- Country: United States
- State: Pennsylvania
- County: Northumberland

Area
  - Total: 0.97 sq mi (2.52 km^{2})
  - Land: 0.97 sq mi (2.52 km^{2})
  - Water: 0.0039 sq mi (0.01 km^{2})

Population (2020)
  - Total: 2,075
  - Density: 2,136/sq mi (824.7/km^{2})
- Time zone: UTC-5 (Eastern (EST))
  - Summer (DST): UTC-4 (EDT)
- FIPS code: 42-24948

Fairview-Ferndale is a census-designated place (CDP), located in Coal Township, in Northumberland County, Pennsylvania, United States. The population was 2,411 at the 2000 census.

== Geography ==
Fairview-Ferndale is located at 40°46′59″N 76°34′22″W (40.783112, -76.572758).

According to the United States Census Bureau, the CDP has a total area of 0.9 square miles (2.3 km^{2}), all land.

== Demographics ==
Historical population
Census	Pop.	Note	%±
2020	2,075		—
U.S. Decennial Census

As of the census of 2000, there were 2,411 people, 1,040 households, and 674 families residing in the CDP. The population density was 2,662.8 inhabitants per square mile (1,028.1/km^{2}). There were 1,168 housing units at an average density of 1,290.0 per square mile (498.1/km^{2}). The racial makeup of the CDP was 99.25% White, 0.21% African American, 0.04% Native American, 0.08% Asian, 0.12% from other races, and 0.29% from two or more races. Hispanic or Latino of any race were 0.12% of the population.

There were 1,040 households, out of which 22.7% had children under the age of 18 living with them, 48.3% were married couples living together, 11.3% had a female householder with no husband present, and 35.1% were non-families. 31.6% of all households were made up of individuals, and 17.4% had someone living alone who was 65 years of age or older. The average household size was 2.29 and the average family size was 2.83.

In the CDP, the population was spread out, with 18.8% under the age of 18, 7.5% from 18 to 24, 26.5% from 25 to 44, 24.1% from 45 to 64, and 23.2% who were 65 years of age or older. The median age was 43 years. For every 100 females, there were 90.4 males. For every 100 females age 18 and over, there were 89.5 males.

The median income for a household in the CDP was $27,219, and the median income for a family was $34,976. Males had a median income of $27,850 versus $18,924 for females. The per capita income for the CDP was $15,400. About 10.3% of families and 12.8% of the population were below the poverty line, including 17.8% of those under age 18 and 11.0% of those age 65 or over.

== Education ==
It is in the Shamokin Area School District.
