= Tharptown, Pennsylvania =

Unincorporated community in Pennsylvania, US

Coordinates: 40°48′13″N 76°34′12″W

Tharptown, Pennsylvania Uniontown
- Census-designated place
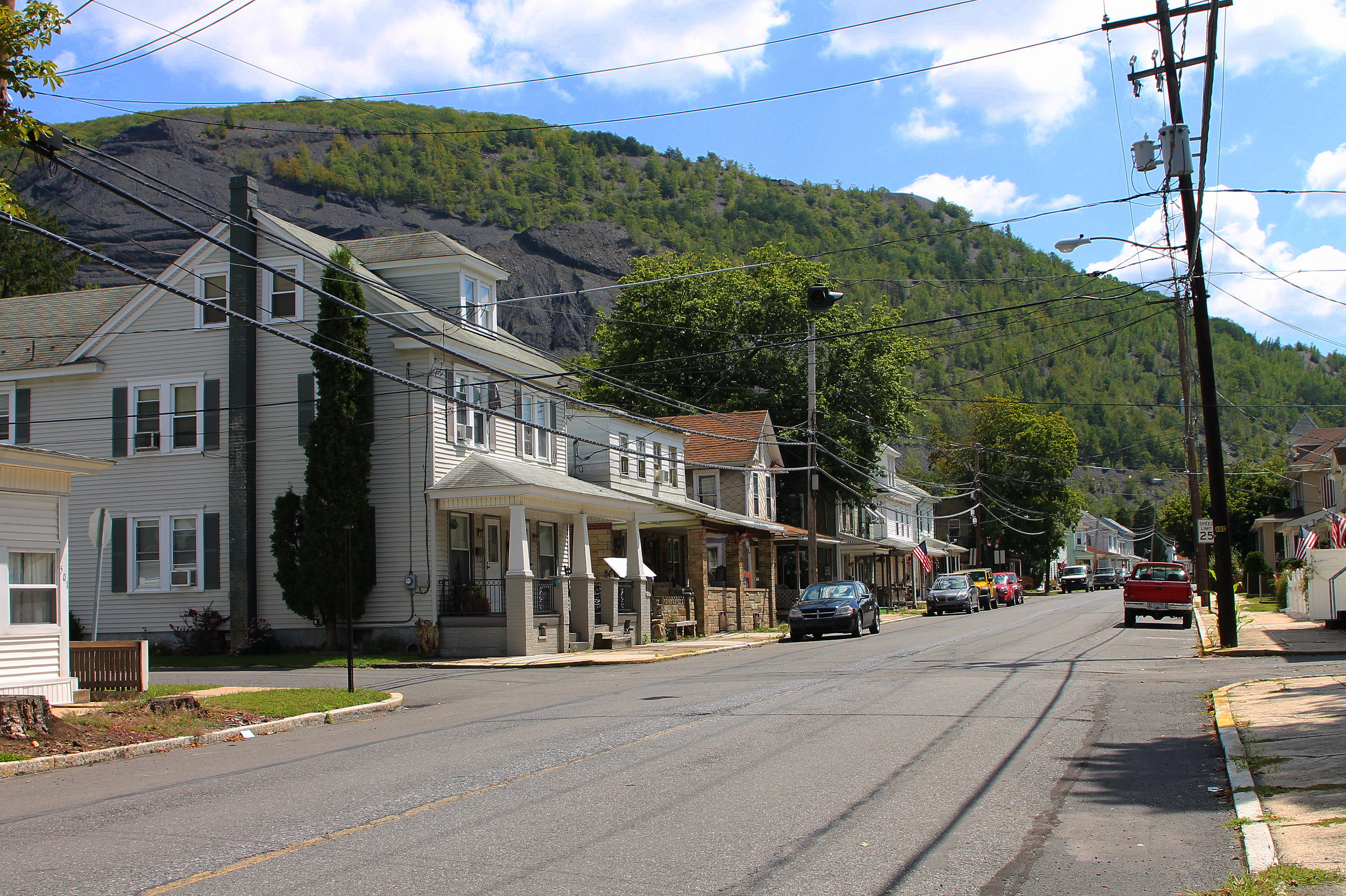
- Tharptown, with the Glen Burn Bank in the background
- Interactive map of Tharptown, Pennsylvania
- Country: United States
- State: Pennsylvania
- County: Northumberland

Population (2020)
  - Total: 487
- Time zone: UTC-5 (Eastern (EST))
  - Summer (DST): UTC-4 (EDT)

Tharptown, also known as Uniontown, is a census-designated place located in Coal Township, Northumberland County in the state of Pennsylvania. The community is located just to the north of the city of Shamokin along Pennsylvania Route 61. As of the 2020 census the population was 487 residents.

== Education ==
It is in the Shamokin Area School District.
