= Shamokin Area High School =

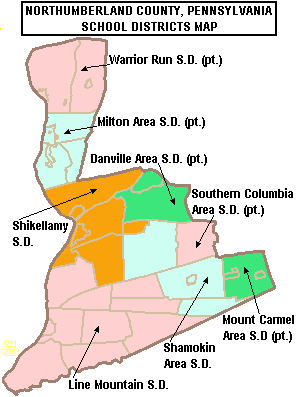

Location
- 2000 West State Street; Coal Township, Northumberland County, Pennsylvania 17866-2807; United States; 40.7816°N 76.5841°W

Information
- Type: Public
- School district: Shamokin Area School District
- Principal: Todd Hockenbroch
- Teaching staff: 39.70 (FTE)
- Grades: 7th - 12th
- Enrollment: 662 (2023–2024)
- Student to teacher ratio: 16.68
- Colors: Purple and White
- Mascot: Purple Indians
- Rival: Mount Carmel Area
- Website: https://www.indians.k12.pa.us/230818_2

Shamokin Area High School is a small, rural/suburban, public high school operated by Shamokin Area School District. It is the sole high school operated by the district. The building is labeled Shamokin Area Middle–High School.

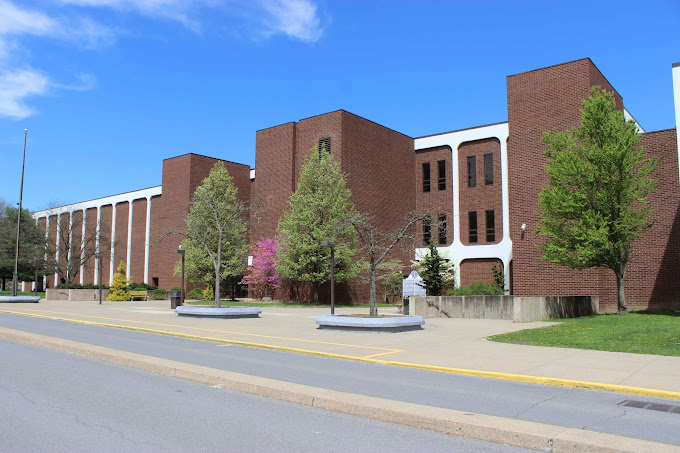
Image of Shamokin Area High School.

== Facilities ==
The middle/high school building houses grades 7 through 12. The building was constructed in 1973–1975. The multi-floor building houses a 1280-seat auditorium, a 3000-seat gymnasium, and a regulation pool with spectator seating. This building was renovated in 1995–1996 to provide additional classroom space to accommodate grades 7 and 8. The building's HVAC system was renovated in this project, and modifications were made to meet American Disabilities Act (ADA) regulations.

== Extracurriculars ==
Shamokin Area High School offers a variety of clubs, activities and an extensive sports program. The Shamokin Area School District is a member of the Pennsylvania Heartland Athletic Conference. The Pennsylvania Heartland Athletic Conference is a voluntary association of 25 PIAA High Schools within the central Pennsylvania region.

Shamokin Area High School has a student-run television program. SATV covers school events and sports broadcasting via the internet and a local cable television network. The school also operates a chapter of the National Honor Society.

Shamokin Area High School is also a member of FBLA, Future Business Leaders of America. They currently hold second place for the Largest Percentage Increase in Local Chapter Membership.

The Shamokin High School Alumni association was established in 1883.

=== Sports ===
Shamokin Area School District maintains an extensive outdoor athletic complex. Kemp Memorial Stadium is a large football and track complex with a seating capacity of 6000, with artificial turf and lighting for night games. The outdoor athletic complex also features practice fields, a lighted soccer stadium, and a baseball field that is dedicated to Douglas Dobson. The athletic facilities of the district are utilized not only by the home teams, but also by various league organizations for hosting playoff games and events. Weight room and athletic training facilities are located in the middle/high school.

The district funds:

Boys

- Baseball - AAAA
- Basketball - AAAA
- Cross Country - AA
- Football - AAAA
- Soccer - AAA
- Swimming and Diving - Class AA
- Track and Field - AAA
- Wrestling - AA
- Bocce Ball - AA

Girls

- Basketball - AAAA
- Cheer - AAAAAA
- Cross Country - AA
- Soccer (Fall) - AAA
- Softball - AAAA
- Swimming and Diving - AA
- Track and Field - AAA
- Volleyball - AAA
- Bocce Ball - AA

According to PIAA School Directory July 2017

== Notable alumni ==
- Tony Deppen, professional wrestler
- Eddie Korbich, Broadway actor
