= Northumberland County Career Technology Center =

Coordinates: 40.780843°N 76.580251°W

Northumberland County Career and Technology Center
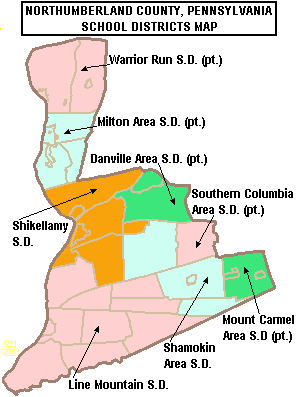

Location
- 1700-2000 West Montgomery Street; Coal Township, Northumberland, Pennsylvania 17866-3333; United States

Information
- Type: Public
- Opened: August 14, 1967
- Oversight: Line Mountain School District, Mount Carmel Area School District, Shamokin Area School District
- Principal: Traci Beck
- Staff: 5 non teaching staff members
- Faculty: 12 teachers (2013)
- Grades: 10th - 12th
- Enrollment: 166 pupils (2015)
- Language: English
- Website: https://www.ncavts.org/

Northumberland County Career and Technology Center is a small, rural, public, vocational school located in Northumberland County, Pennsylvania. Enrollment was 166 pupils grades 10-12th in 2015.

The school was founded by three Northumberland County public schools in 1967. The member school districts are: Line Mountain School District, Mount Carmel Area School District and Shamokin Area School District.

== Programs ==
Northumberland County Career Technology Center offers a variety of career tracts.

- Cosmetology
- Institutional Food
- Computer Tech
- Child Care
- Homeland Security and Law Enforcement
- Fire and Related Protective Services
- Carpentry/Carpenter
- Electrician and Power Transmission Installers
- HVAC
- Autobody/Collision and Repair
- Auto Mechanics Tech
- Welding Tech/Welder
- Health and Medical Assisting

== Penn College NOW ==
In 2015, Northumberland County Career and Technology Center offered several dual enrollment courses in conjunction with Pennsylvania College of Technology. Penn College NOW classes are taught by approved local high school teachers, at the high school. Penn College NOW is partially funded by the Carl D. Perkins Career and Technical Education Improvement Act of 2006 (Public Law 109-270) through the Pennsylvania Department of Education, by the support of Pennsylvania companies through the Educational Improvement Tax Credit program managed by the Pennsylvania Department of Community and Economic Development and by Pennsylvania College of Technology.

== Adult education ==
The school offers a variety of evening classes to adults in the surrounding communities. Tuition rates are charged to the attendee.

- Automotive State Inspection
- Residential Wiring
- Welding
- Car Care
- ServSafe-Food Safety Management approved by the Pennsylvania Department of Agriculture (PDA). Successful completers of this course and the exam will be eligible for state certification.
