= Kapp Heights, Pennsylvania =

Unincorporated community in Pennsylvania, US

Coordinates: 40°53′58″N 76°48′36″W

- Census-designated place
- Interactive map of Kapp Heights, Pennsylvania
- Country: United States
- State: Pennsylvania
- County: Northumberland

Area
  - Total: 0.35 sq mi (0.90 km^{2})
  - Land: 0.35 sq mi (0.90 km^{2})
  - Water: 0 sq mi (0.00 km^{2})

Population (2020)
  - Total: 877
  - Density: 2,519.8/sq mi (972.91/km^{2})
- Time zone: UTC-5 (Eastern (EST))
  - Summer (DST): UTC-4 (EDT)
- ZIP code: 17857
- Area codes: 272 and 570
- FIPS code: 42-38744

Kapp Heights is a census-designated place located in Point Township, Northumberland County in the state of Pennsylvania. The community is located very close to the borough of Northumberland along Pennsylvania Route 147, near the confluence of the West Branch Susquehanna River and Susquehanna Rivers. As of the 2010 census the population was 863 residents.

== Demographics ==
Historical population
Census	Pop.	Note	%±
2020	877		—
U.S. Decennial Census

== Education ==
It is in the Shikellamy School District
