= Marshallton, Northumberland County, Pennsylvania =

Unincorporated community in Pennsylvania, US

Marshallton
- Census-designated place
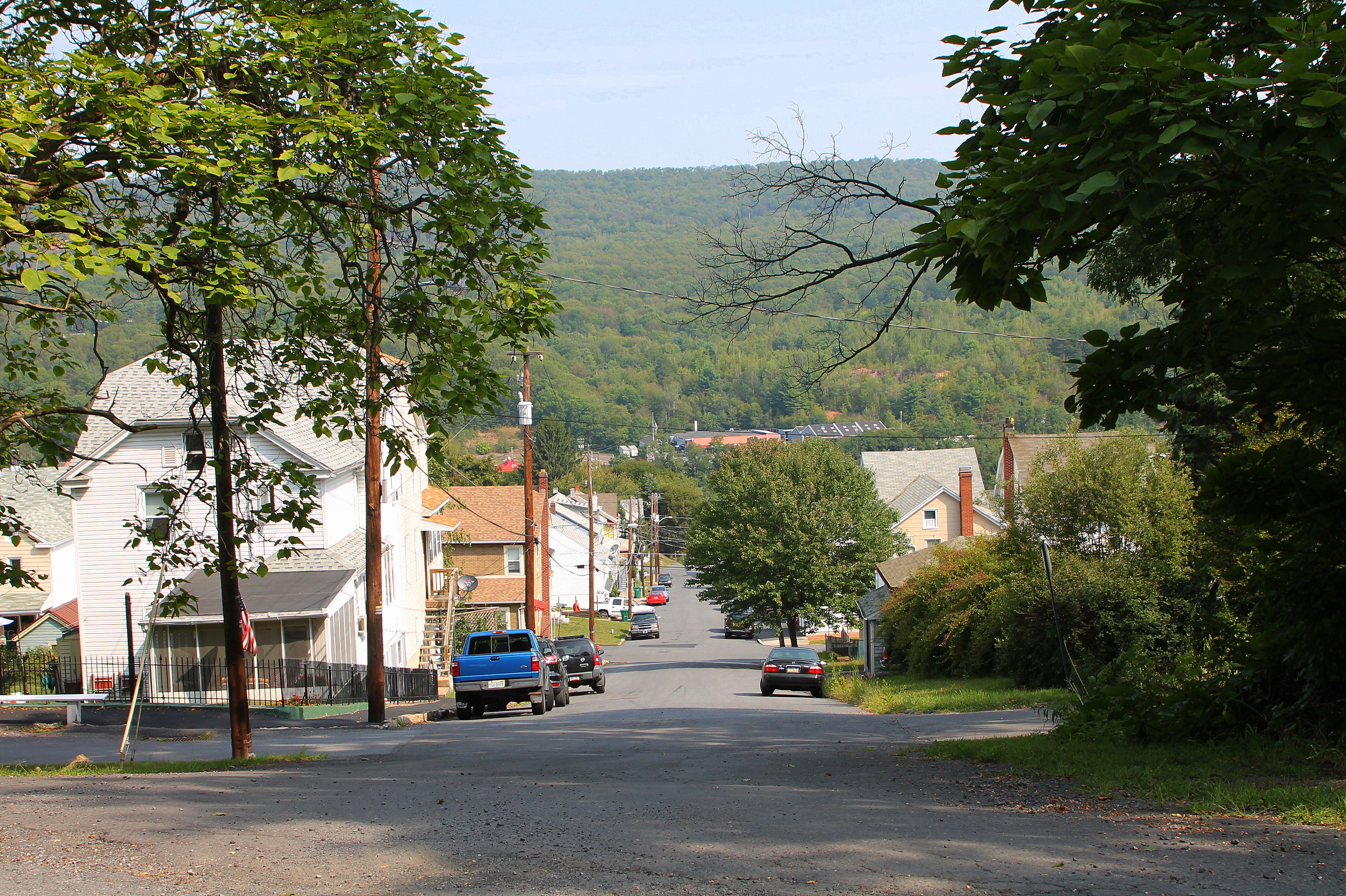
- Marshallton, Pennsylvania streetscape

- Location within the U.S. state of Pennsylvania Marshallton (the United States)
- Coordinates: 40°47′15″N 76°32′18″W
- Country: United States
- State: Pennsylvania
- County: Northumberland

Area
  - Total: 0.89 sq mi (2.3 km^{2})
  - Land: 0.89 sq mi (2.3 km^{2})

Population (2010)
  - Total: 1,441
  - Density: 1,600/sq mi (630/km^{2})
- Time zone: UTC-5 (Eastern (EST))
  - Summer (DST): UTC-4 (EDT)
- ZIP codes: 17866

Marshallton is a census-designated place (CDP), located in Coal Township, in Northumberland County, Pennsylvania, United States. The population was 1,441 at the 2010 census.

== Geography ==
Marshallton is located at 40°47′15″N 76°32′18″W (40.787484, -76.538358).

According to the United States Census Bureau, the CDP has a total area of 0.9 square miles (2.3 km^{2}), all land.

== Demographics ==
As of the census of 2000, there were 1,437 people, 640 households, and 384 families residing in the CDP. The population density was 1,646.3 inhabitants per square mile (635.6/km^{2}). There were 756 housing units at an average density of 866.1 per square mile (334.4/km^{2}). The racial makeup of the CDP was 99.51% White, 0.14% African American, 0.07% from other races, and 0.28% from two or more races. Hispanic or Latino of any race were 0.56% of the population.

There were 640 households, out of which 24.5% had children under the age of 18 living with them, 40.6% were married couples living together, 12.8% had a female householder with no husband present, and 40.0% were non-families. 35.5% of all households were made up of individuals, and 20.3% had someone living alone who was 65 years of age or older. The average household size was 2.22 and the average family size was 2.82.

In the CDP, the population was spread out, with 21.8% under the age of 18, 5.5% from 18 to 24, 26.2% from 25 to 44, 22.2% from 45 to 64, and 24.3% who were 65 years of age or older. The median age was 43 years. For every 100 females, there were 90.8 males. For every 100 females age 18 and over, there were 85.8 males.

The median income for a household in the CDP was $23,173, and the median income for a family was $28,679. Males had a median income of $35,161 versus $16,793 for females. The per capita income for the CDP was $13,135. About 9.7% of families and 14.6% of the population were below the poverty line, including 15.2% of those under age 18 and 12.2% of those age 65 or over.

== Education ==
It is in the Shamokin Area School District.
