= Ranshaw, Pennsylvania =

Unincorporated community in Pennsylvania, US

- Census-designated place
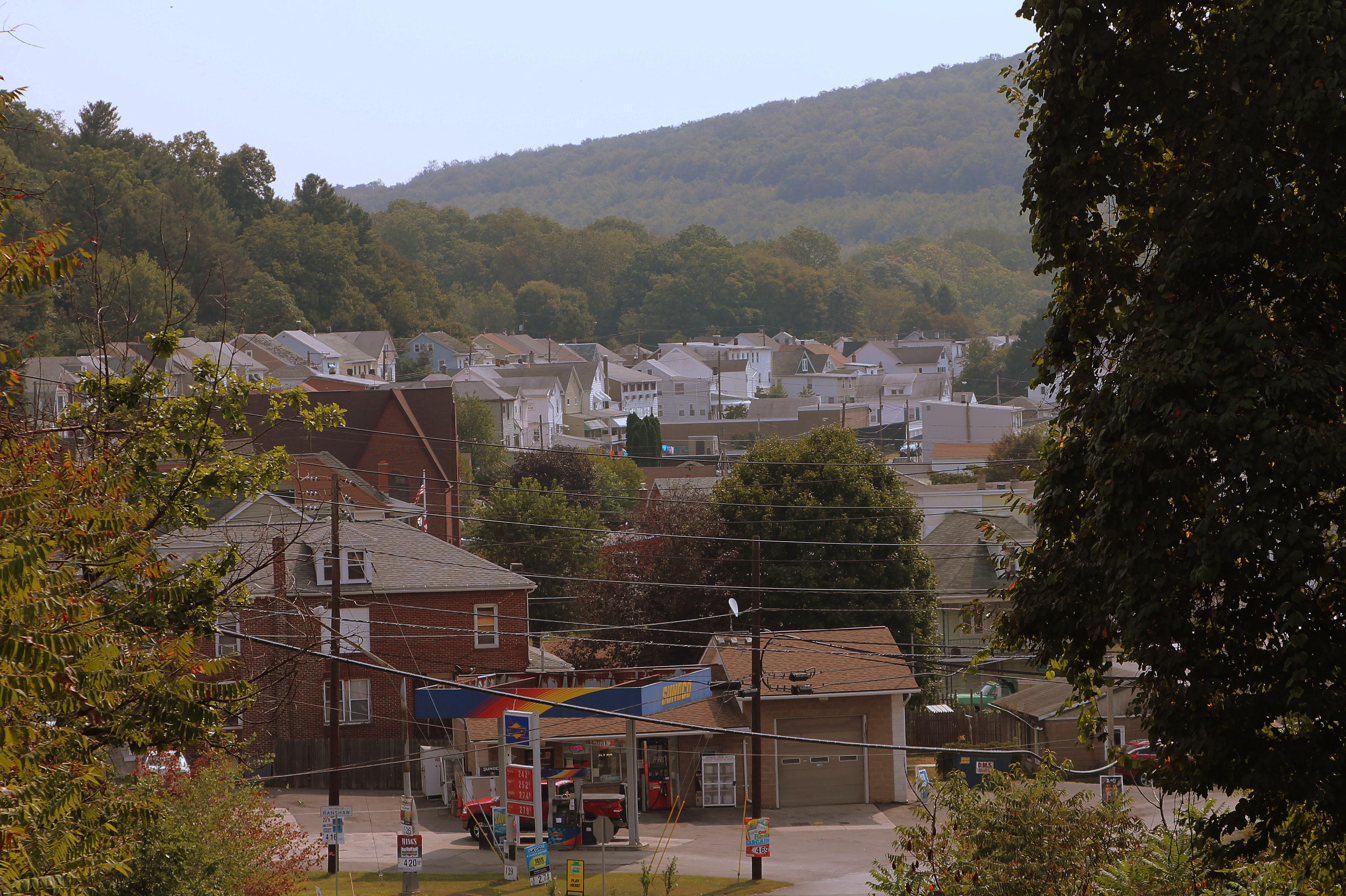
- Ranshaw, Pennsylvania

- Location within Pennsylvania
- Coordinates: 40°47′09″N 76°31′05″W
- Country: United States
- State: Pennsylvania
- County: Northumberland
- Township: Coal

Area
  - Total: 0.14 sq mi (0.36 km^{2})
  - Land: 0.14 sq mi (0.36 km^{2})
  - Water: 0 sq mi (0.00 km^{2})
- Elevation: 853 ft (260 m)

Population (2020)
  - Total: 176
  - Density: 3,300.5/sq mi (1,274.33/km^{2})
- Time zone: UTC-5 (Eastern (EST))
  - Summer (DST): UTC-4 (EDT)
- ZIP code: 17866
- Area codes: 570 and 272
- FIPS code: 42-63416
- GNIS feature ID: 1184656

Ranshaw is a census-designated place located in Coal Township, Northumberland County in the state of Pennsylvania. The community is located to the east of the city of Shamokin. As of the 2020 census the population was 176 residents.

== Demographics ==
Historical population
Census	Pop.	Note	%±
2020	455		—
U.S. Decennial Census

== Education ==
It is in the Shamokin Area School District.
