= Point Township, Pennsylvania =

Township in Pennsylvania, US

Coordinates: 40°56′00″N 76°42′59″W

- Township
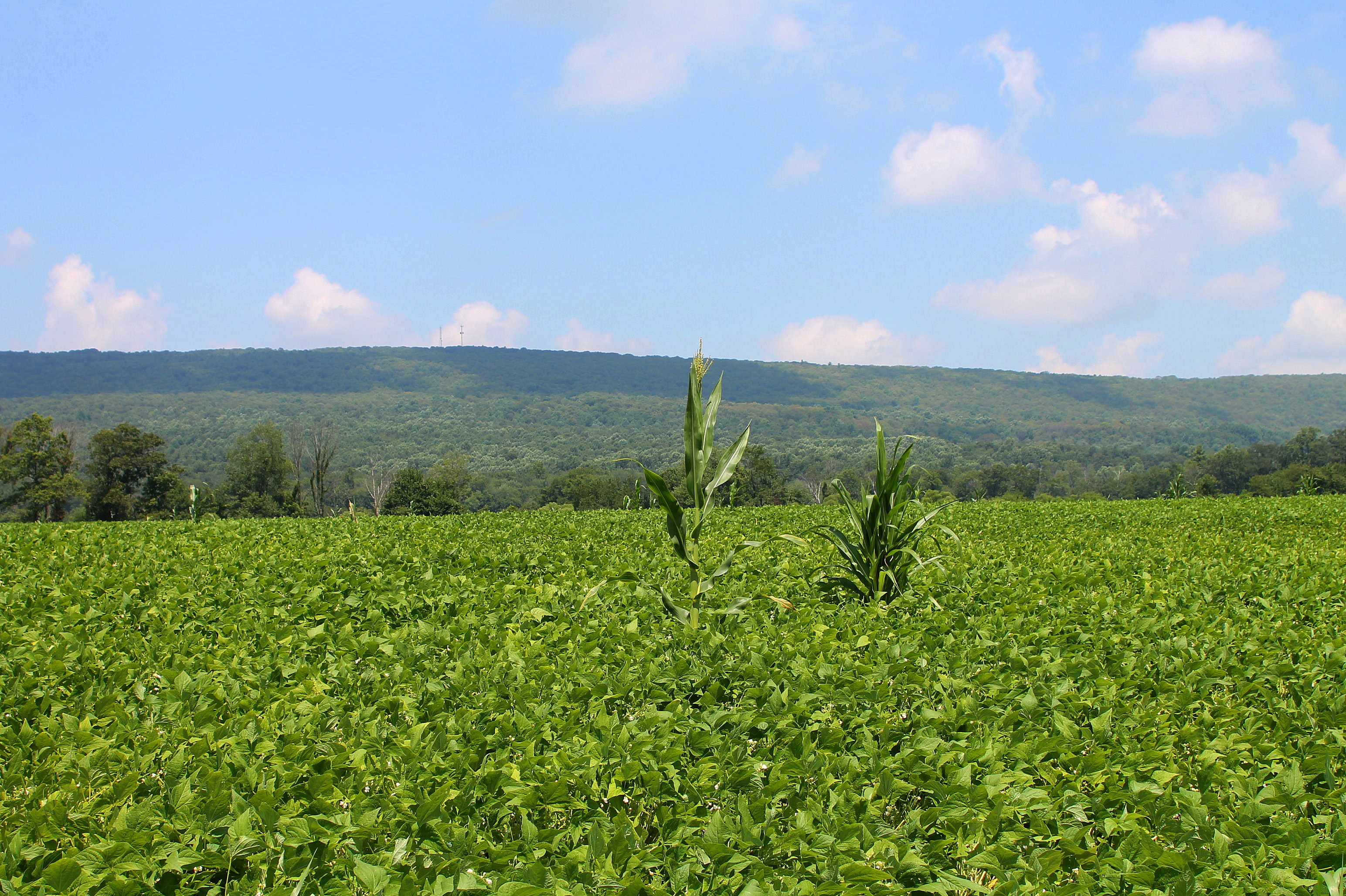
- Field and Montour Ridge in Point Township

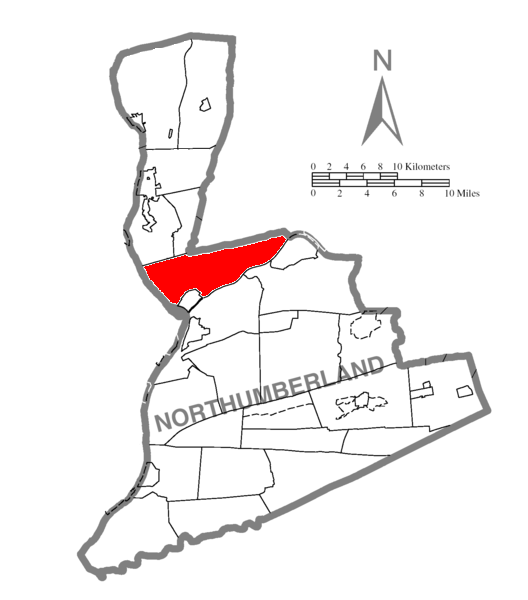
- Map of Northumberland County, Pennsylvania highlighting Point Township

- Map of Northumberland County, Pennsylvania
- Country: United States
- State: Pennsylvania
- County: Northumberland
- Settled: 1756
- Incorporated: 1786

Government
  - Type: Board of Supervisors

Area
  - Total: 27.51 sq mi (71.24 km^{2})
  - Land: 25.16 sq mi (65.16 km^{2})
  - Water: 2.35 sq mi (6.08 km^{2})

Population (2010)
  - Total: 3,685
  - Estimate (2016): 3,673
  - Density: 146.0/sq mi (56.37/km^{2})
- Time zone: UTC-5 (Eastern (EST))
  - Summer (DST): UTC-4 (EDT)
- Area code: 570
- FIPS code: 42-097-61832
- Website: https://pointtownship.org/

Point Township is a township in Northumberland County, Pennsylvania, United States. The population at the 2010 Census was 3,685, a decline from the figure of 3,722 tabulated in 2000.

== Geography ==
According to the United States Census Bureau, the township has a total area of 27.4 square miles (70.8 km^{2}), of which 25.2 square miles (65.2 km^{2}) is land and 2.2 square miles (5.7 km^{2}) (8.01%) is water. The township includes the census-designated place of Kapp Heights and surrounds, but excludes, the borough of Northumberland.

== Demographics ==
Historical population
Census	Pop.	Note	%±
2010	3,685		—
2016 (est.)	3,673		−0.3%
U.S. Decennial Census

As of the census of 2000, there were 3,722 people, 1,443 households, and 1,057 families residing in the township. The population density was 148.0 inhabitants per square mile (57.1/km^{2}). There were 1,523 housing units at an average density of 60.5 per square mile (23.4/km^{2}). The racial makeup of the township was 98.55% White, 0.35% African American, 0.21% Native American, 0.38% Asian, 0.11% from other races, and 0.40% from two or more races. Hispanic or Latino of any race were 0.70% of the population.

There were 1,443 households, out of which 27.9% had children under the age of 18 living with them, 64.4% were married couples living together, 6.0% had a female householder with no husband present, and 26.7% were non-families. 21.6% of all households were made up of individuals, and 10.6% had someone living alone who was 65 years of age or older. The average household size was 2.44 and the average family size was 2.81.

In the township the population was spread out, with 20.2% under the age of 18, 4.5% from 18 to 24, 26.2% from 25 to 44, 28.1% from 45 to 64, and 21.0% who were 65 years of age or older. The median age was 44 years. For every 100 females, there were 93.7 males. For every 100 females age 18 and over, there were 89.2 males.

The median income for a household in the township was $43,276, and the median income for a family was $49,211. Males had a median income of $34,054 versus $22,708 for females. The per capita income for the township was $20,251. About 4.2% of families and 5.3% of the population were below the poverty line, including 4.7% of those under age 18 and 8.8% of those age 65 or over.
