= Edgewood, Northumberland County, Pennsylvania =

Unincorporated community in Pennsylvania, US

Edgewood
- Census-designated place
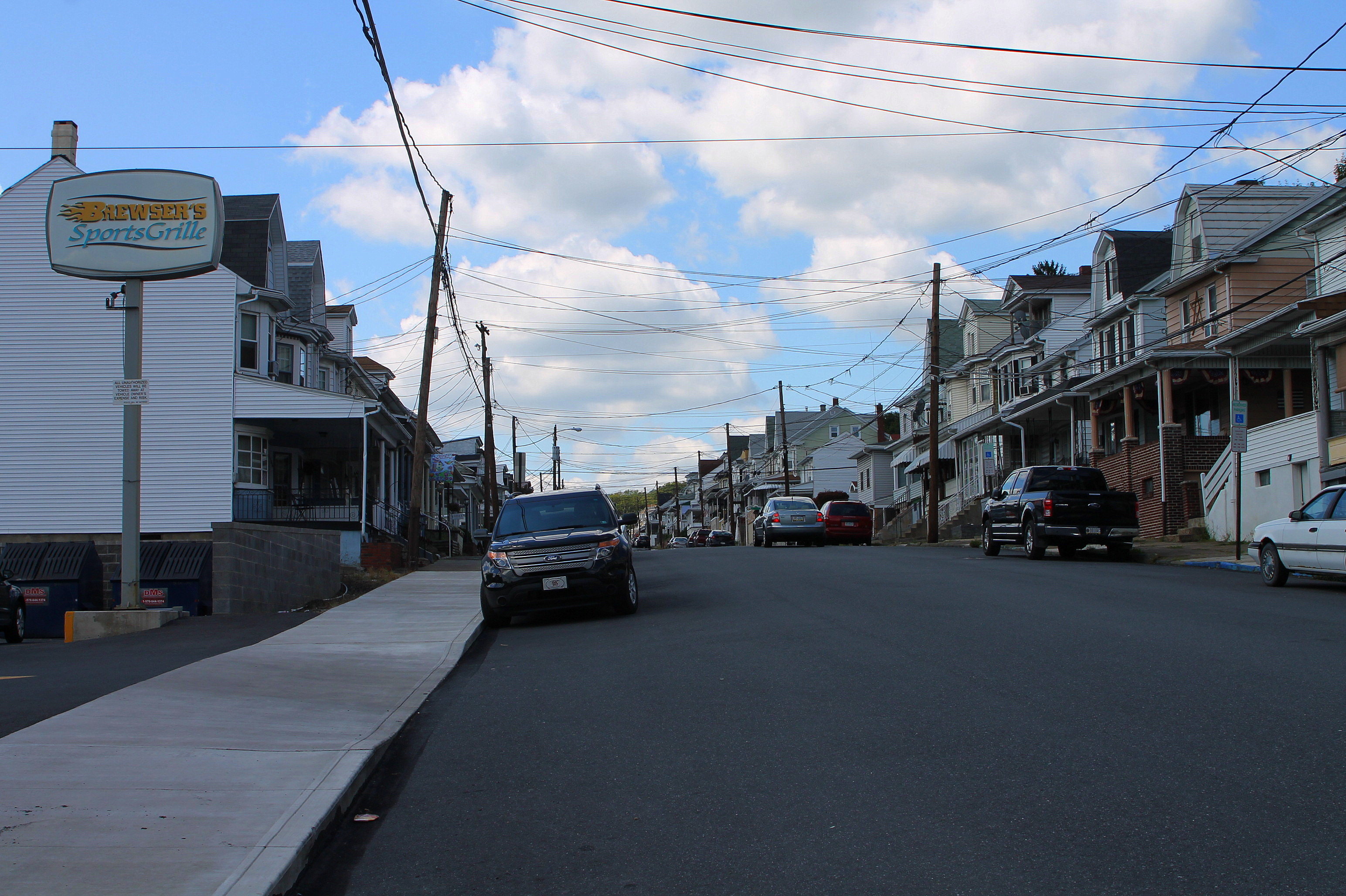
- Street in Edgewood

- Location within the state of Pennsylvania Edgewood (the United States)
- Coordinates: 40°47′20″N 76°34′37″W
- Country: United States
- State: Pennsylvania
- County: Northumberland

Area
  - Total: 0.50 sq mi (1.3 km^{2})
  - Land: 0.50 sq mi (1.3 km^{2})

Population (2000)
  - Total: 2,619
  - Density: 5,200/sq mi (2,000/km^{2})
- Time zone: UTC-5 (Eastern (EST))
  - Summer (DST): UTC-4 (EDT)

Edgewood is a census-designated place (CDP) located in Coal Township, in Northumberland County, Pennsylvania, United States, immediately adjacent to the western border of the City of Shamokin. The population was 2,619 at the 2000 census.

== Geography ==
Edgewood is located at 40°47′20″N 76°34′37″W (40.788976, -76.576913).

According to the United States Census Bureau, the CDP has a total area of 0.5 square miles (1.3 km^{2}), all land.

== Demographics ==
As of the census of 2000, there were 2,619 people, 1,184 households, and 732 families residing in the CDP. The population density was 5,323.1 inhabitants per square mile (2,055.3/km^{2}). There were 1,318 housing units at an average density of 2,678.8 per square mile (1,034.3/km^{2}). The racial makeup of the CDP was 98.63% White, 0.15% African American, 0.04% Native American, 0.46% Asian, 0.15% from other races, and 0.57% from two or more races. Hispanic or Latino of any race were 0.38% of the population.

There were 1,184 households, out of which 23.7% had children under the age of 18 living with them, 48.4% were married couples living together, 9.6% had a female householder with no husband present, and 38.1% were non-families. 35.4% of all households were made up of individuals, and 22.1% had someone living alone who was 65 years of age or older. The average household size was 2.21 and the average family size was 2.83.

In the CDP, the population was spread out, with 20.0% under the age of 18, 6.2% from 18 to 24, 25.7% from 25 to 44, 25.5% from 45 to 64, and 22.6% who were 65 years of age or older. The median age was 44 years. For every 100 females, there were 86.9 males. For every 100 females age 18 and over, there were 82.2 males.

The median income for a household in the CDP was $27,303, and the median income for a family was $40,259. Males had a median income of $32,042 versus $23,859 for females. The per capita income for the CDP was $17,445. About 12.2% of families and 14.7% of the population were below the poverty line, including 10.9% of those under age 18 and 15.5% of those age 65 or over.

== Education ==
It is in the Shamokin Area School District.
