= East Cameron Township, Northumberland County, Pennsylvania =

Township in Pennsylvania, US

Coordinates: 40°45′30″N 76°30′59″W

East Cameron Township, Pennsylvania
- Township
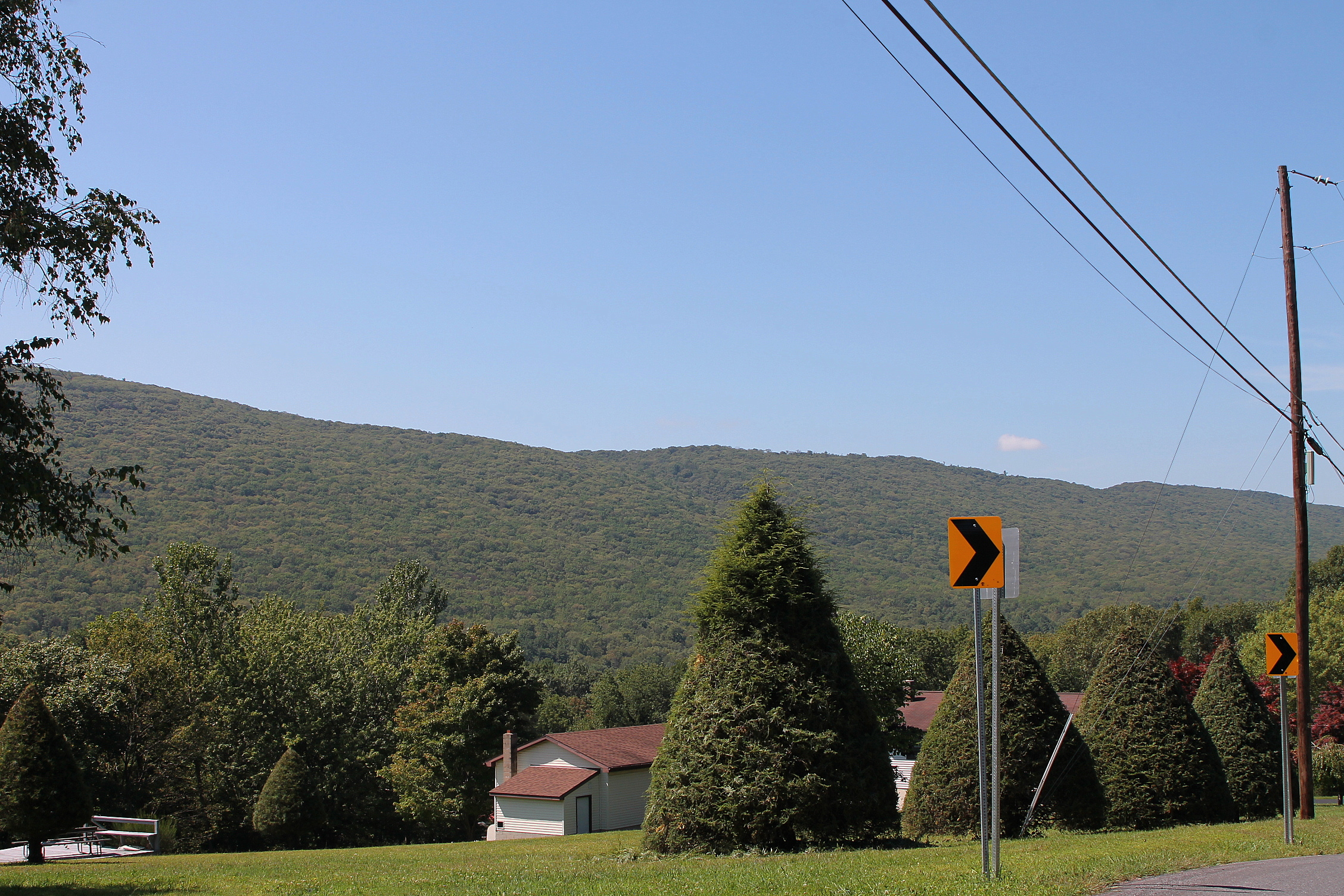
- View of a wooded ridge in East Cameron Township

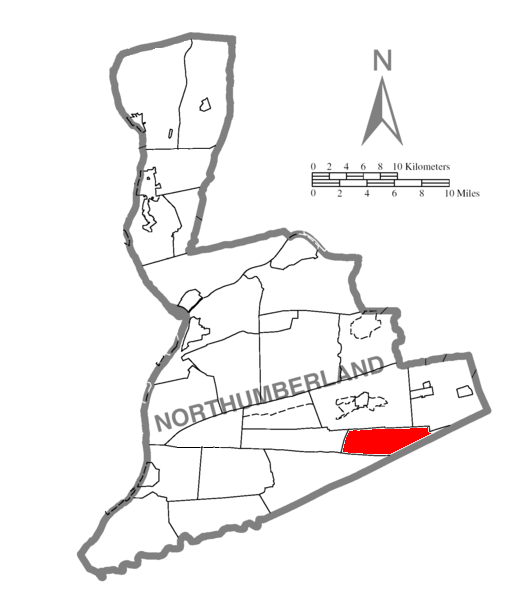
- Map of Northumberland County, Pennsylvania highlighting East Cameron Township

- Map of Northumberland County, Pennsylvania
- Country: United States
- State: Pennsylvania
- County: Northumberland

Government
  - Type: Board of Supervisors

Area
  - Total: 12.17 sq mi (31.51 km^{2})
  - Land: 12.01 sq mi (31.11 km^{2})
  - Water: 0.15 sq mi (0.39 km^{2})

Population (2020)
  - Total: 623 ▼
  - Estimate (2022): 615
  - Density: 60.8/sq mi (23.46/km^{2})
- Time zone: UTC-5 (Eastern (EST))
  - Summer (DST): UTC-4 (EDT)
- Area code: 570
- FIPS code: 42-097-20928

East Cameron Township is a township in Northumberland County, Pennsylvania, United States. The population at the 2020 Census was 623, a decrease from the figure of 748 tabulated in 2010.

== Geography ==
According to the United States Census Bureau, the township has a total area of 11.9 square miles (31 km^{2}), all land.

== Demographics ==
Historical population
Census	Pop.	Note	%±
2010	748		—
2020	623		−16.7%
2022 (est.)	615		−1.3%
U.S. Decennial Census

As of the census of 2000, there were 686 people, 267 households, and 210 families residing in the township. The population density was 57.8 inhabitants per square mile (22.3/km^{2}). There were 301 housing units at an average density of 25.4/sq mi (9.8/km^{2}). The racial makeup of the township was 99.56% White, 0.29% Native American and 0.15% Asian. Hispanic or Latino of any race were 1.31% of the population.

There were 267 households, out of which 29.2% had children under the age of 18 living with them, 69.7% were married couples living together, 6.0% had a female householder with no husband present, and 21.0% were non-families. 18.7% of all households were made up of individuals, and 9.0% had someone living alone who was 65 years of age or older. The average household size was 2.57 and the average family size was 2.91.

In the township the population was spread out, with 22.2% under the age of 18, 5.2% from 18 to 24, 29.6% from 25 to 44, 28.9% from 45 to 64, and 14.1% who were 65 years of age or older. The median age was 41 years. For every 100 females, there were 100.0 males. For every 100 females age 18 and over, there were 96.3 males.

The median income for a household in the township was $32,500, and the median income for a family was $38,594. Males had a median income of $30,481 versus $17,500 for females. The per capita income for the township was $15,345. About 11.0% of families and 11.8% of the population were below the poverty line, including 14.9% of those under age 18 and 6.0% of those age 65 or over.
