= Marion Heights, Pennsylvania =

Borough in Pennsylvania, US

- Borough
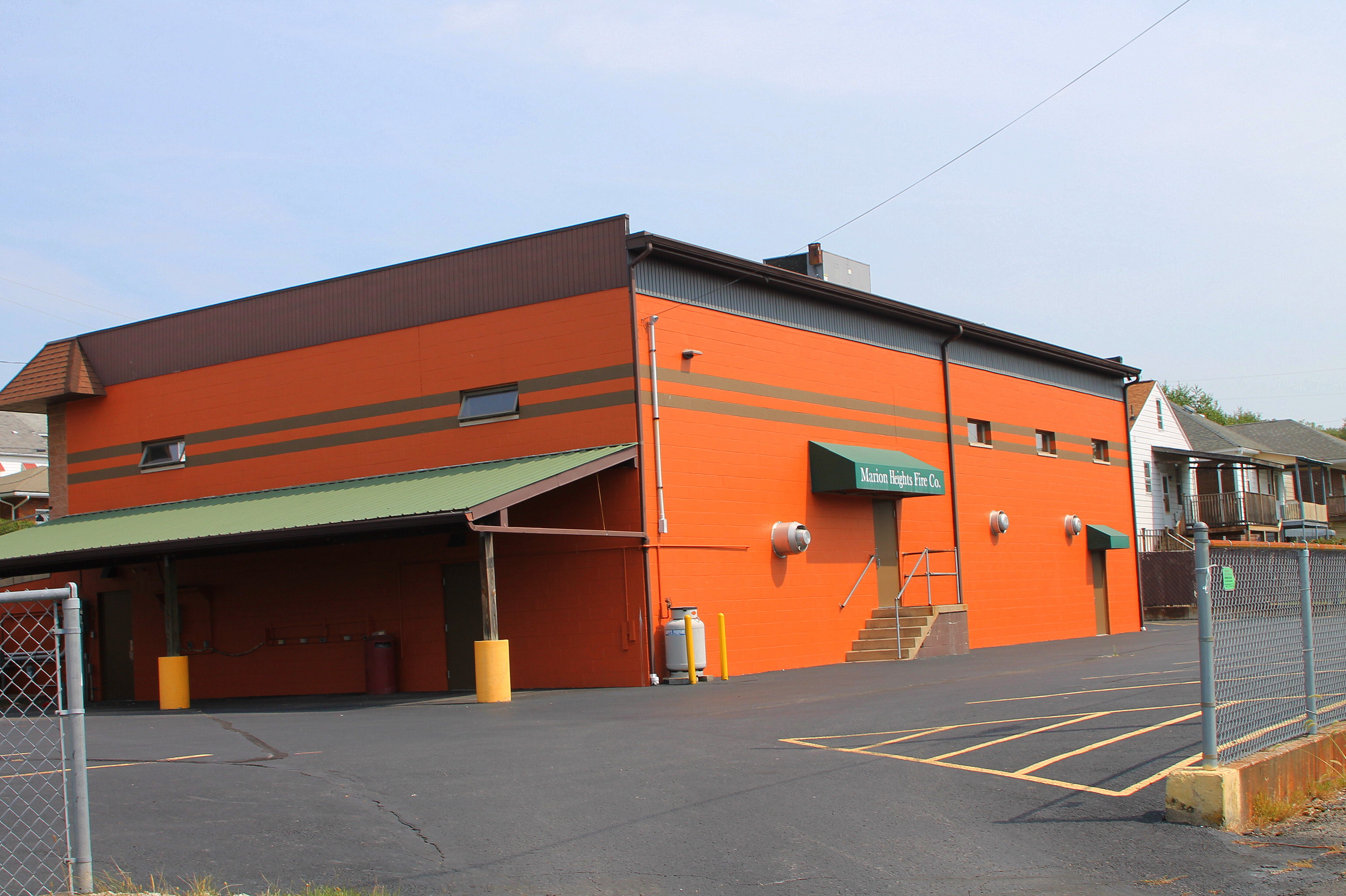
- Marion Heights Fire Company building
- Nickname: Da Heights
- Location of Marion Heights in Northumberland County, Pennsylvania.

- Location on Marion Heights in Pennsylvania Marion Heights (the United States)
- Coordinates: 40°48′17″N 76°27′50″W
- Country: United States
- State: Pennsylvania
- County: Northumberland
- Incorporated: 1906

Government
  - Type: Borough Council

Area
  - Total: 0.15 sq mi (0.40 km^{2})
  - Land: 0.15 sq mi (0.40 km^{2})
  - Water: 0 sq mi (0.00 km^{2})
- Elevation (center of borough): 1,400 ft (430 m)
- Highest elevation (high point in borough near cemetery): 1,421 ft (433 m)
- Lowest elevation (southern boundary of borough): 1,300 ft (400 m)

Population (2020)
  - Total: 560
  - Density: 3,667.5/sq mi (1,416.03/km^{2})
- Time zone: UTC-5 (Eastern (EST))
  - Summer (DST): UTC-4 (EDT)
- Zip code: 17832
- Area code: 570
- FIPS code: 42-47480
- Website: https://marionheightsborough.org/

Marion Heights is a borough in Northumberland County, Pennsylvania, United States. As of the 2020 census, Marion Heights had a population of 560.

== Geography ==
Marion Heights is located at 40°48′17″N 76°27′50″W (40.804745, -76.464013). According to the United States Census Bureau, the borough has a total area of 0.2 square miles (0.52 km^{2}), all land.

== Government ==
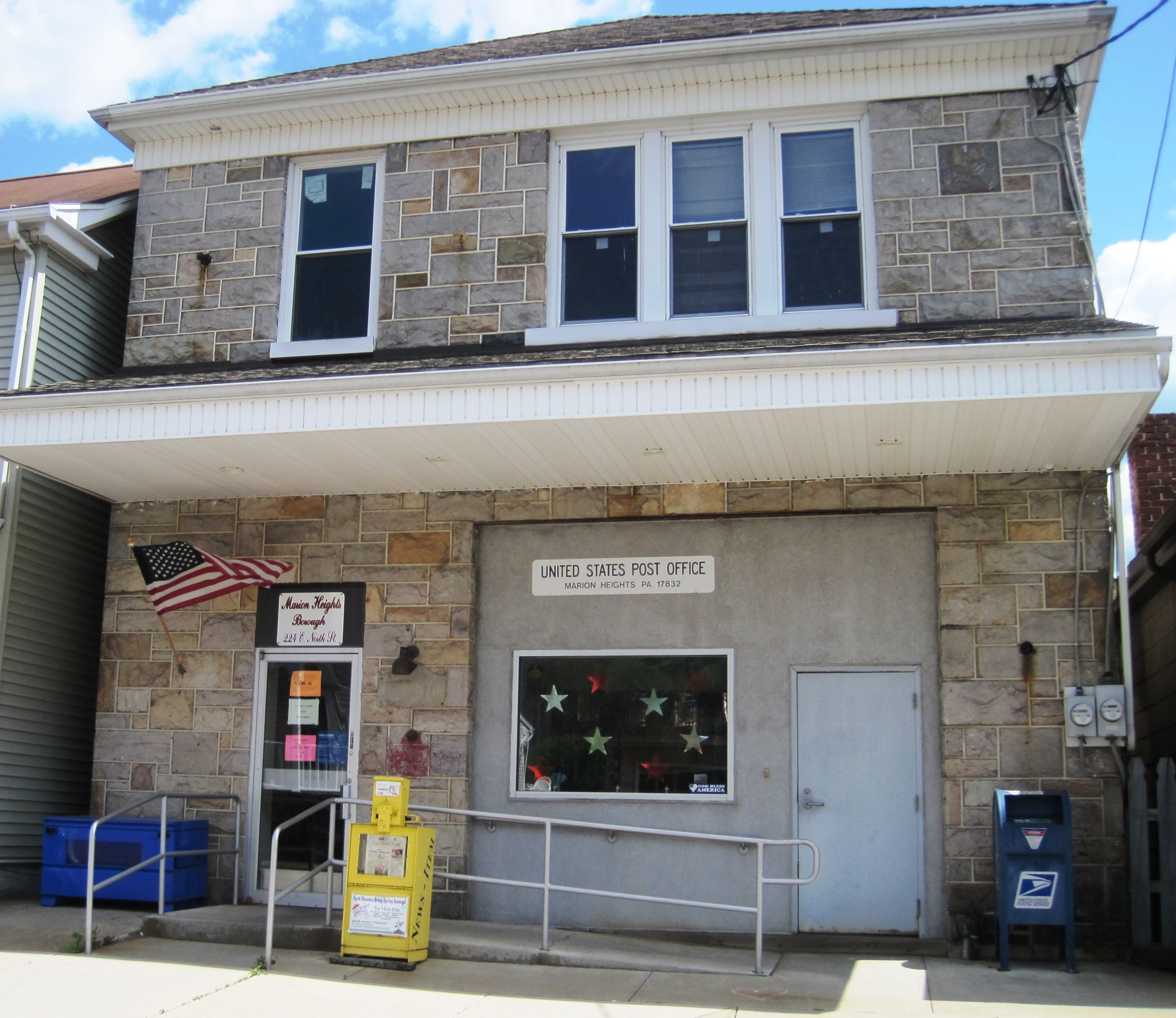
Marion Heights Borough Hall

Marion Heights in governed by an elected borough council and mayor. As of 2023, the mayor of Marion Heights is John Wargo.

== Demographics ==
Historical population
| Census | Pop. | Note | %± |
|---|---|---|---|
| 1910 | 1,362 | | — |
| 1920 | 1,874 | | 37.6% |
| 1930 | 2,001 | | 6.8% |
| 1940 | 2,068 | | 3.3% |
| 1950 | 1,551 | | −25.0% |
| 1960 | 1,132 | | −27.0% |
| 1970 | 958 | | −15.4% |
| 1980 | 921 | | −3.9% |
| 1990 | 837 | | −9.1% |
| 2000 | 735 | | −12.2% |
| 2010 | 611 | | −16.9% |
| 2020 | 560 | | −8.3% |

As of the census of 2000, there were 735 people, 314 households, and 212 families residing in the borough. The population density was 3,772.5 inhabitants per square mile (1,456.6/km^{2}). There were 375 housing units at an average density of 1,924.7 per square mile (743.1/km^{2}). The racial makeup of the borough was 99.32% White, 0.14% Native American, and 0.54% from two or more races. Hispanic or Latino of any race were 0.41% of the population.

There were 314 households, out of which 24.5% had children under the age of 18 living with them, 48.7% were married couples living together, 13.7% had a female householder with no husband present, and 32.2% were non-families. 29.9% of all households were made up of individuals, and 15.6% had someone living alone who was 65 years of age or older. The average household size was 2.34 and the average family size was 2.89.

In the borough the population was spread out, with 19.2% under the age of 18, 6.5% from 18 to 24, 26.9% from 25 to 44, 26.0% from 45 to 64, and 21.4% who were 65 years of age or older. The median age was 43 years. For every 100 females there were 92.4 males. For every 100 females age 18 and over, there were 88.6 males.

The median income for a household in the borough was $29,107, and the median income for a family was $37,500. Males had a median income of $31,029 versus $21,250 for females. The per capita income for the borough was $15,772. About 5.3% of families and 5.9% of the population were below the poverty line, including 2.7% of those under age 18 and 11.0% of those age 65 or over.

== Education ==
It is in the Mount Carmel Area School District.

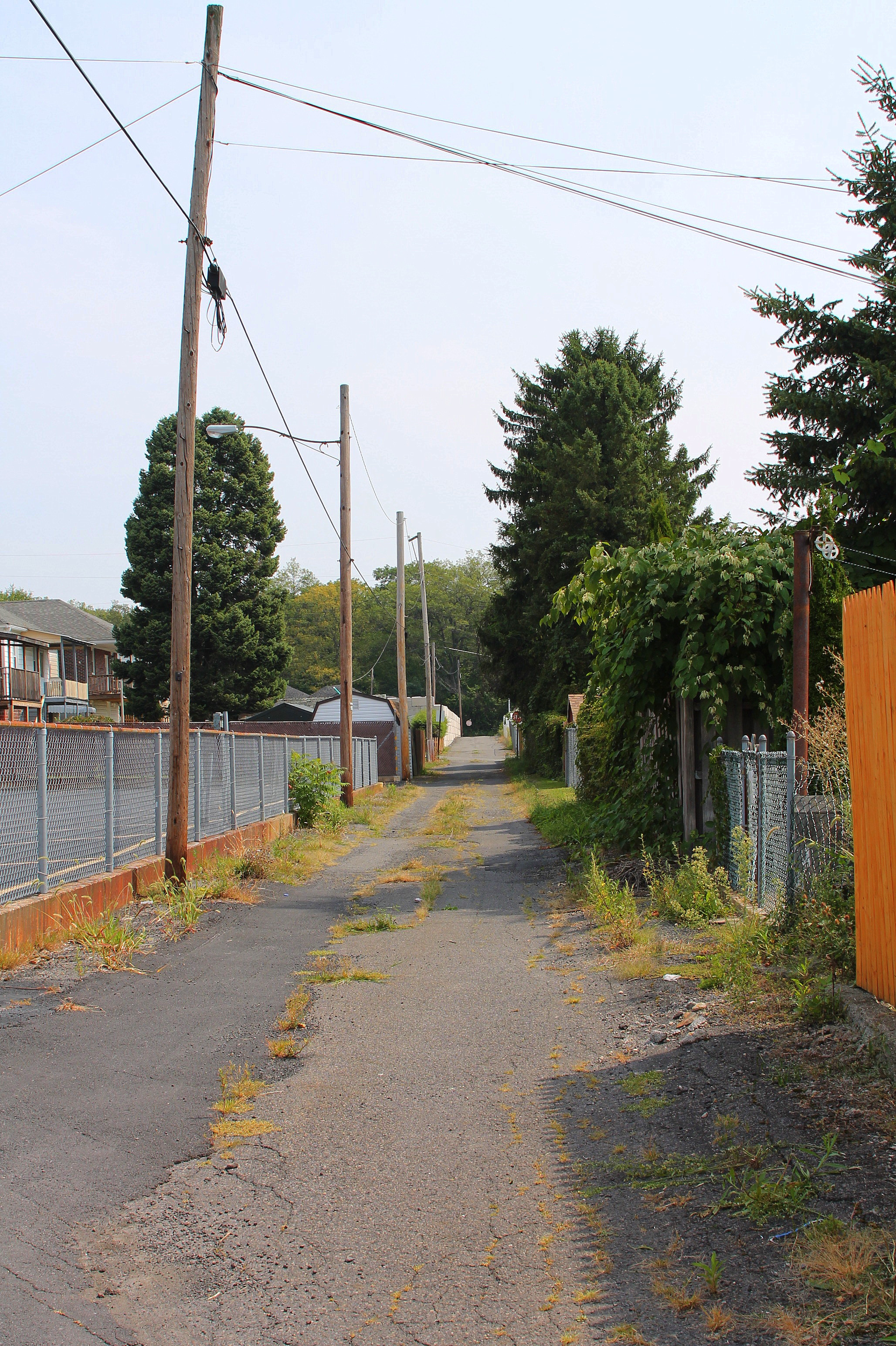
Mine Street in Marion Heights
