= Northumberland County, Pennsylvania =

County in Pennsylvania, United States

- County
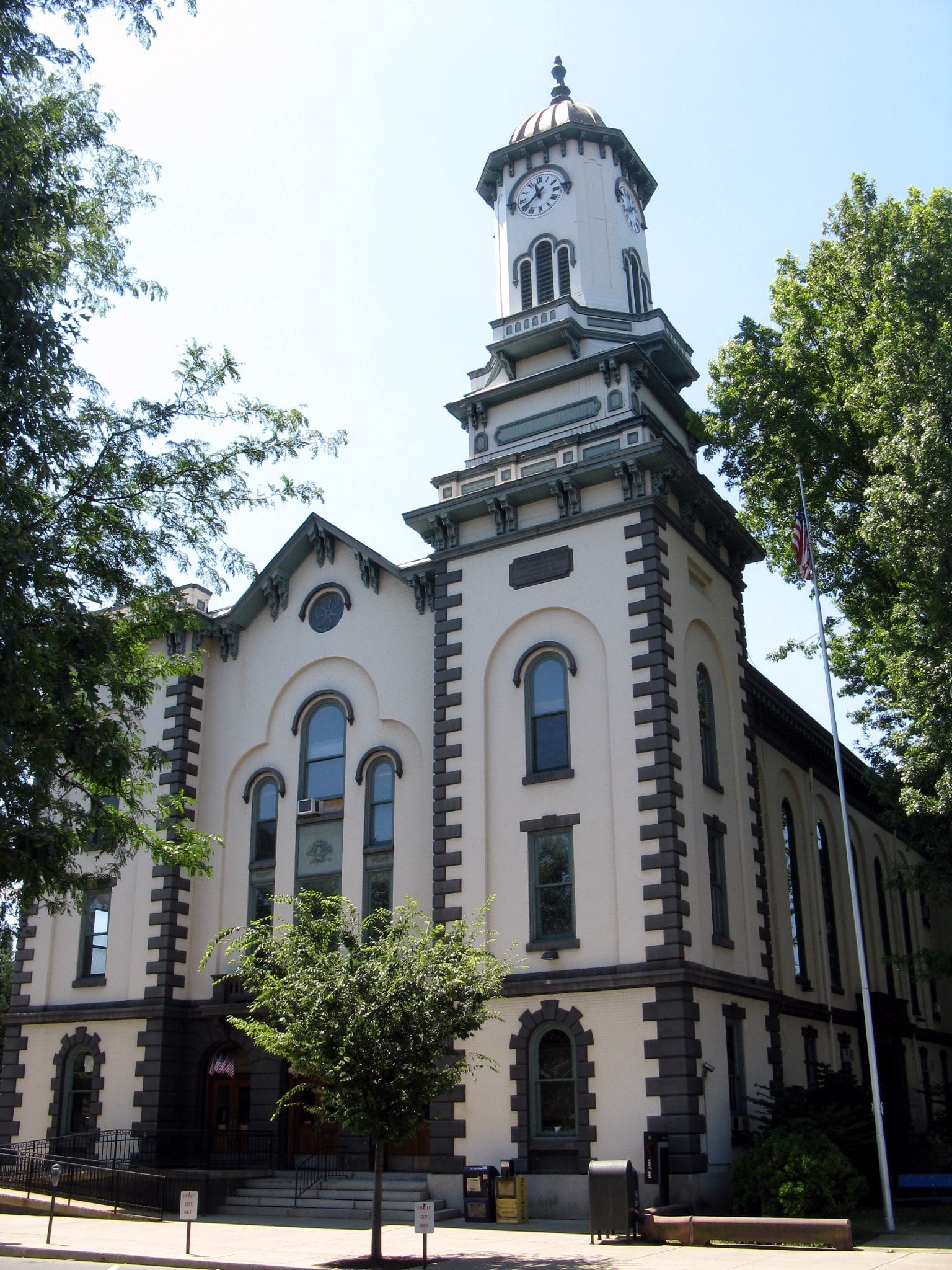
- Northumberland County Courthouse

- Location within the U.S. state of Pennsylvania
- Coordinates: 40°51′N 76°43′W
- Country: United States
- State: Pennsylvania
- Founded: March 21, 1772
- Named for: Northumberland, England
- Seat: Sunbury
- Largest city: Sunbury

Area
  - Total: 478 sq mi (1,240 km^{2})
  - Land: 458 sq mi (1,190 km^{2})
  - Water: 19 sq mi (49 km^{2}) 4.0%

Population (2020)
  - Total: 91,647
  - Estimate (2025): 89,920 ▼
  - Density: 196.6/sq mi (75.9/km^{2})
- Time zone: UTC−5 (Eastern)
  - Summer (DST): UTC−4 (EDT)
- Congressional district: 9th
- Website: northumberlandcountypa.gov

Northumberland County is a county in the Commonwealth of Pennsylvania. As of the 2020 census, the population was 91,647. Its county seat is Sunbury. The county is part of the Central Pennsylvania region of the state. (Note: Includes Centre, Lycoming, Northumberland, Columbia, Mifflin, Union, Snyder, Clinton, Juniata and Montour Counties)

The county was formed in 1772 from parts of Lancaster, Berks, Bedford, Cumberland, and Northampton Counties and named for the county of Northumberland in northern England. Northumberland County is a fifth class county according to the Pennsylvania's County Code. Northumberland County comprises the Sunbury, Pennsylvania Micropolitan Statistical Area, which is also included in the Bloomsburg-Berwick-Sunbury, PA Combined Statistical Area. Among its notable residents are Thomas L. Hamer, a Democratic member of Congress in the 1830s, and Joseph Priestley, the Enlightenment chemist and theologian, who left England in 1796 due to religious and political persecution and settled on the Susquehanna River. His former house, originally purchased by chemists from Pennsylvania State University after a colloquium that founded the American Chemical Society, is a historical museum.

== History ==
Before European settlement the area was inhabited by the Akhrakouaeronon or Atrakouaehronon, a subtribe of the Susquehannock. By 1813 the area once comprising the sprawling county of Northumberland had been divided over time and allotted to other counties such that lands once occupied by Old Northumberland at its greatest extent are now found in Centre, Columbia, Luzerne, Lycoming, Mifflin, Union, Clearfield, Clinton, Montour, Bradford, Lackawanna, Susquehanna, Wyoming, Tioga, Potter, McKean, Warren, Venango, Snyder, and Schuylkill Counties.

== Geography ==
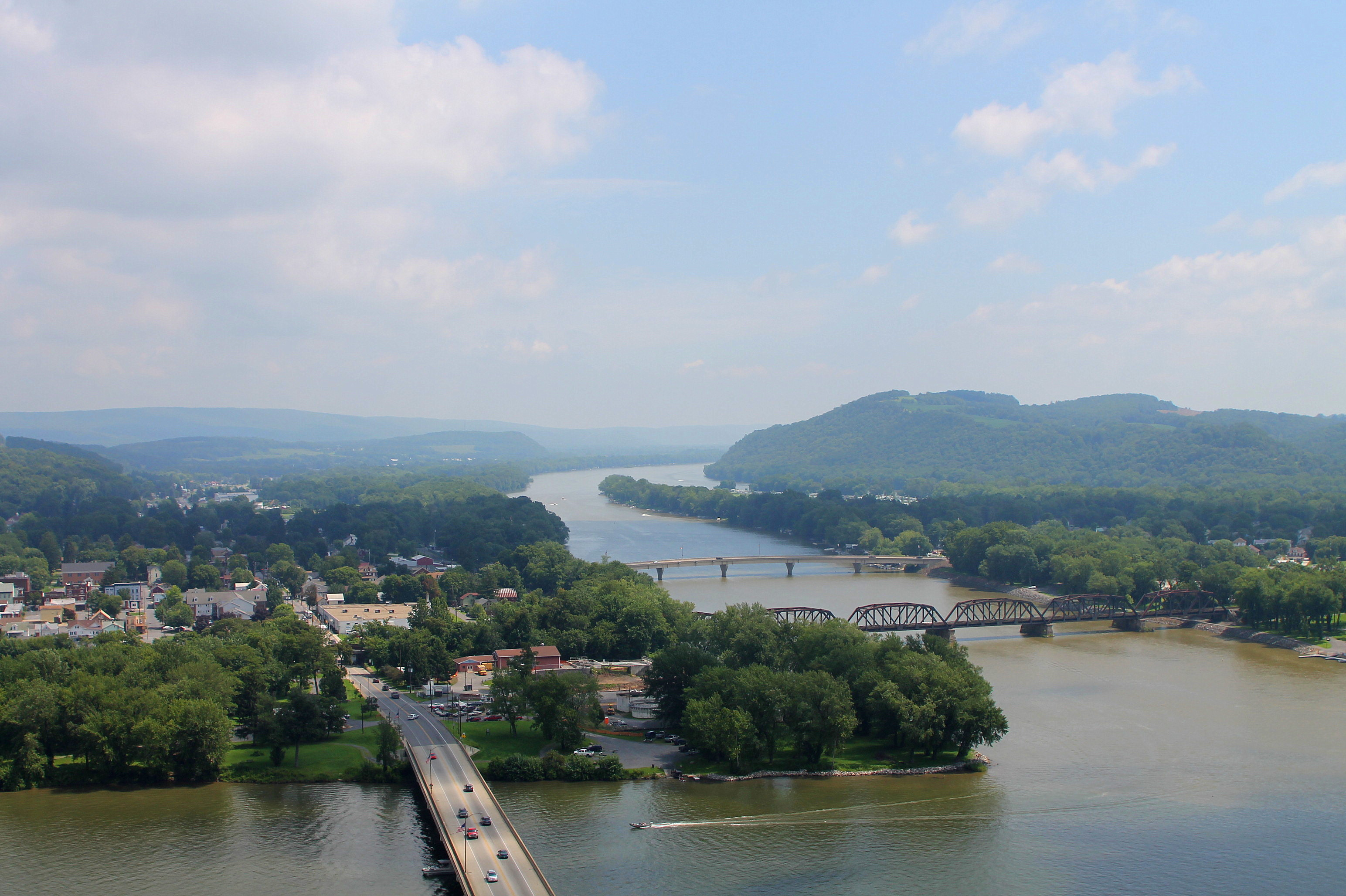
Susquehanna River from the Shikellamy State Park overlook, looking upriver. The West Branch Susquehanna River is in the foreground.

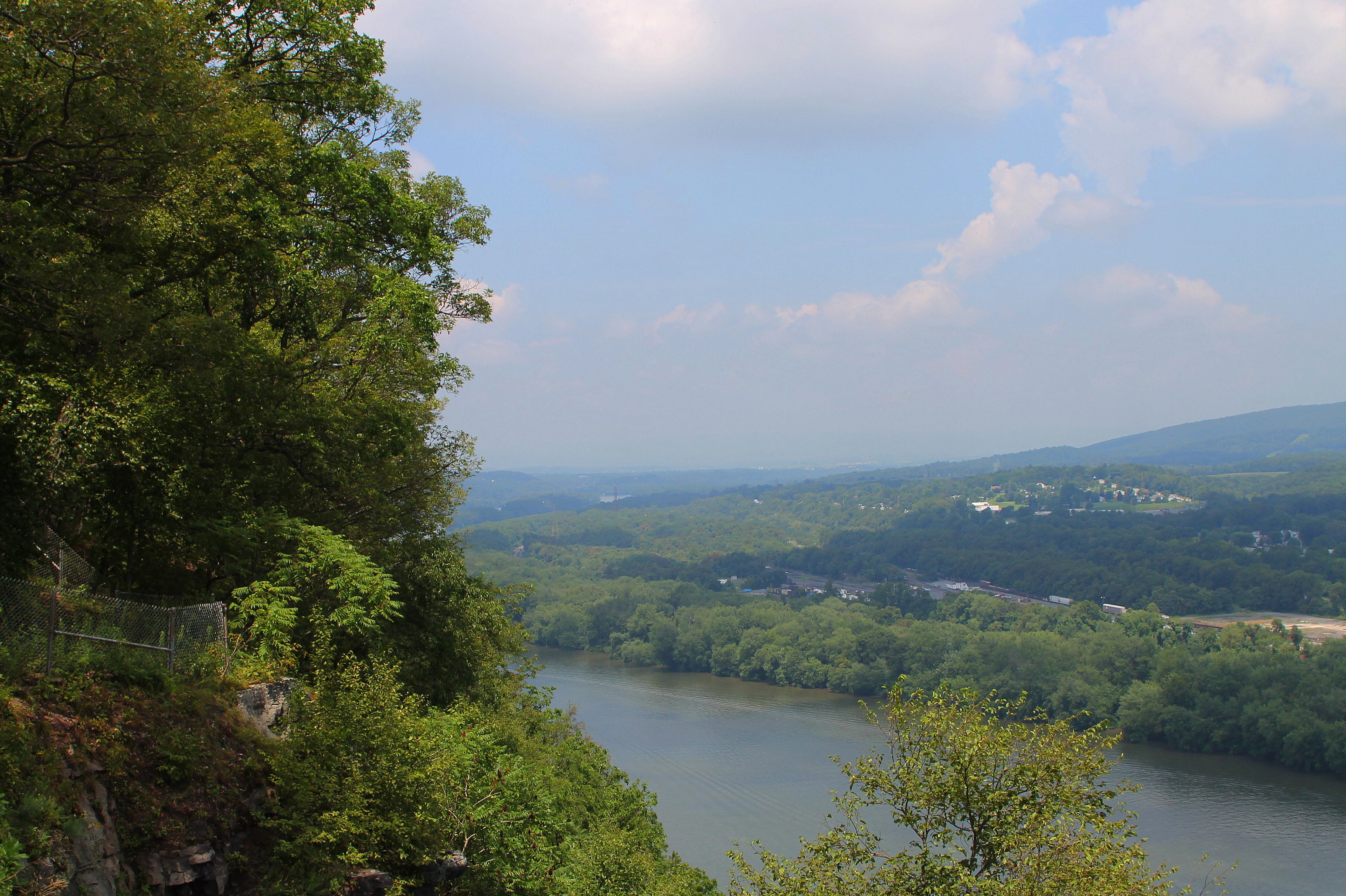
View looking northeast from the Shikellamy State Park overlook

According to the U.S. Census Bureau, the county has a total area of 478 square miles (1,240 km^{2}), of which 458 square miles (1,190 km^{2}) is land and 19 square miles (49 km^{2}) (4.0%) is water.

The county has a humid continental climate (Dfa/Dfb). Average temperatures in Sunbury range from 27.3 °F in January to 72.7 °F in July, while in Mount Carmel they range from 25.0 °F in January to 70.2 °F in July.

The main river in Northumberland County is the Susquehanna River. The Susquehanna River's tributaries in the county include the West Branch Susquehanna River, Chillisquaque Creek, Shamokin Creek, and Mahanoy Creek. The county has mountains in the south and north, with the rest being mostly rolling hills.

=== Mountains ===
Name	Height
Mahanoy Mountain	433 meters
Big Mountain	402 meters

=== Major highways ===
- I-80
- I-180
- US 11
- PA 44
- PA 45
- PA 54
- PA 61
- PA 125
- PA 147
- PA 225
- PA 254
- PA 405
- PA 487
- PA 642
- PA 890
- PA 901

=== Adjacent counties ===
- Lycoming County (north)
- Montour County (northeast)
- Columbia County (east)
- Schuylkill County (southeast)
- Dauphin County (south)
- Perry County (southwest)
- Juniata County (west)
- Snyder County (west)
- Union County (west)

== Demographics ==
Historical population
Census	Pop.	Note	%±
1790	17,147		—
1800	27,797		62.1%
1810	36,327		30.7%
1820	15,424		−57.5%
1830	18,133		17.6%
1840	20,027		10.4%
1850	23,272		16.2%
1860	28,922		24.3%
1870	41,444		43.3%
1880	53,123		28.2%
1890	74,698		40.6%
1900	90,911		21.7%
1910	111,420		22.6%
1920	122,079		9.6%
1930	128,504		5.3%
1940	126,887		−1.3%
1950	117,115		−7.7%
1960	104,138		−11.1%
1970	99,190		−4.8%
1980	100,381		1.2%
1990	96,771		−3.6%
2000	94,556		−2.3%
2010	94,528		0.0%
2020	91,647		−3.0%
2025 (est.)	89,920	▼	−1.9%
U.S. Decennial Census; 1790–1960 1900–1990; 1990–2000 2010–2017 2010-2020

=== Racial and ethnic composition ===
Northumberland County, Pennsylvania – Racial and ethnic composition Note: the US Census treats Hispanic/Latino as an ethnic category. This table excludes Latinos from the racial categories and assigns them to a separate category. Hispanics/Latinos may be of any race.
Race / Ethnicity (NH = Non-Hispanic)	Pop 1980	Pop 1990	Pop 2000	Pop 2010	Pop 2020	% 1980	% 1990	% 2000	% 2010	% 2020
White alone (NH)	99,680	95,659	91,314	89,166	81,689	99.30%	98.85%	96.57%	94.33%	89.13%
Black or African American alone (NH)	161	311	1,397	1,814	2,392	0.16%	0.32%	1.48%	1.92%	2.61%
Native American or Alaska Native alone (NH)	46	74	83	115	110	0.05%	0.08%	0.09%	0.12%	0.12%
Asian alone (NH)	125	170	206	325	444	0.12%	0.18%	0.22%	0.34%	0.48%
Native Hawaiian or Pacific Islander alone (NH)	x	x	13	10	24	x	x	0.01%	0.01%	0.03%
Other race alone (NH)	68	25	37	74	199	0.07%	0.03%	0.04%	0.08%	0.22%
Mixed race or Multiracial (NH)	x	x	465	771	2,638	x	x	0.49%	0.82%	2.88%
Hispanic or Latino (any race)	301	532	1,041	2,253	4,151	0.30%	0.55%	1.10%	2.38%	4.53%
Total	100,381	96,771	94,556	94,528	91,647	100.00%	100.00%	100.00%	100.00%	100.00%

=== 2020 census ===
As of the 2020 census, the county had a population of 91,647. The median age was 44.5 years. 20.0% of residents were under the age of 18 and 21.6% of residents were 65 years of age or older. For every 100 females there were 101.3 males, and for every 100 females age 18 and over there were 100.1 males age 18 and over.

The racial makeup of the county was 90.4% White, 2.8% Black or African American, 0.2% American Indian and Alaska Native, 0.5% Asian, <0.1% Native Hawaiian and Pacific Islander, 2.0% from some other race, and 4.1% from two or more races. Hispanic or Latino residents of any race comprised 4.5% of the population.

64.7% of residents lived in urban areas, while 35.3% lived in rural areas.

There were 37,932 households in the county, of which 25.5% had children under the age of 18 living in them. Of all households, 45.2% were married-couple households, 19.2% were households with a male householder and no spouse or partner present, and 26.9% were households with a female householder and no spouse or partner present. About 31.2% of all households were made up of individuals and 15.4% had someone living alone who was 65 years of age or older.

There were 43,300 housing units, of which 12.4% were vacant. Among occupied housing units, 70.6% were owner-occupied and 29.4% were renter-occupied. The homeowner vacancy rate was 1.7% and the rental vacancy rate was 9.3%.

=== 2000 census ===
As of the 2000 census, there were 94,556 people, 38,835 households, and 25,592 families residing in the county. The population density was 206 people per square mile (80 people/km^{2}). There were 43,164 housing units at an average density of 94 units per square mile (36/km^{2}). The racial makeup of the county was 97.09% White, 1.52% Black or African American, 0.10% Native American, 0.22% Asian, 0.02% Pacific Islander, 0.47% from other races, and 0.58% from two or more races. 1.10% of the population were Hispanic or Latino of any race. 32.5% were of German, 12.9% Polish, 9.9% American, 8.2% Italian, 8.1% Irish and 5.8% Dutch ancestry. 95.8% spoke English and 1.5% Spanish as their first language.

There were 38,835 households, out of which 27.30% had children under the age of 18 living with them, 52.40% were married couples living together, 9.60% had a female householder with no husband present, and 34.10% were non-families. 30.20% of all households were made up of individuals, and 15.50% had someone living alone who was 65 years of age or older. The average household size was 2.34 and the average family size was 2.89.

In the county, the population was spread out, with 21.90% under the age of 18, 7.00% from 18 to 24, 27.70% from 25 to 44, 24.40% from 45 to 64, and 19.00% who were 65 years of age or older. The median age was 41 years. For every 100 females there were 96.30 males. For every 100 females age 18 and over, there were 92.80 males.

== Economy ==
Historically, the main employer of the county were the anthracite coal mines that dotted the landscape, as well as manufacturing factories. However, starting in the 1950s, the coal mines began to gradually close down and the factories started to move out, leading to population decline and economic depression.

=== Top employers ===
The top ten employers in Northumberland County are, as of 2023, as follows:

#	Employer
1	Weis Markets
2	Knoebels Amusement Resort
3	State of Pennsylvania
4	Con-Agra Foods
5	Northumberland County
6	Walmart
7	Independent Home Health
8	Geisinger Health System
9	Furman Foods
10	Watsontown Trucking Company

== Micropolitan Statistical Area ==
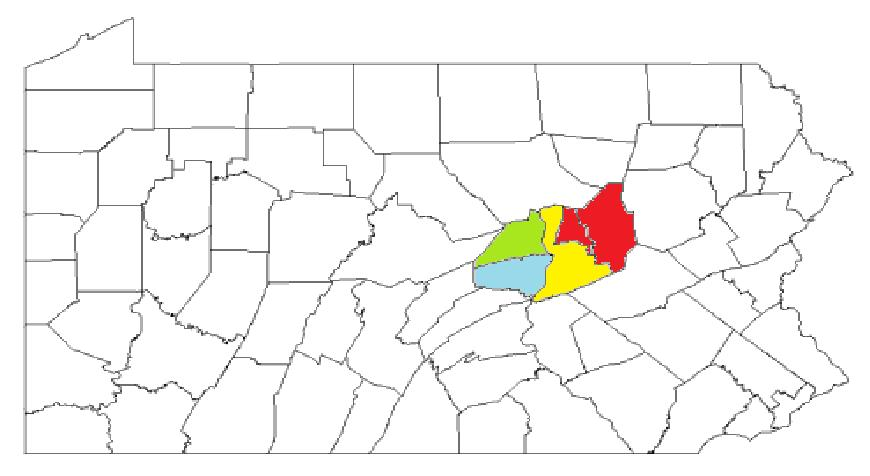
Map of the Bloomsburg–Berwick-Sunbury, PA Combined Statistical Area (CSA), composed of the following parts: Bloomsburg–Berwick, PA Metropolitan Statistical Area (MSA) Sunbury, PA Micropolitan Statistical Area (μSA) Lewisburg, PA Micropolitan Statistical Area (μSA) Selinsgrove, PA Micropolitan Statistical Area (μSA)

The United States Office of Management and Budget has designated Northumberland County as the Sunbury, PA Micropolitan Statistical Area (μSA). As of the 2010 census the micropolitan area ranked 2nd most populous in the State of Pennsylvania and the 37th most populous in the United States with a population of 94,528. Northumberland County is also a part of the Bloomsburg–Berwick–Sunbury, PA Combined Statistical Area (CSA), which combines the population of Northumberland County as well as the Columbia, Montour, Snyder and Union County areas. The Combined Statistical Area ranked 8th in the State of Pennsylvania and 115th most populous in the United States with a population of 264,739.

== Politics and government ==
United States presidential election results for Northumberland County, Pennsylvania
Year	Republican		Democratic		Third party(ies)	
Year	No.	%	No.	%	No.	%
1888	6,288	48.96%	6,257	48.72%	297	2.31%
1892	6,170	44.95%	6,942	50.57%	615	4.48%
1896	8,659	51.68%	7,367	43.97%	730	4.36%
1900	8,366	49.35%	7,989	47.13%	596	3.52%
1904	11,219	62.41%	5,936	33.02%	822	4.57%
1908	10,439	51.97%	8,590	42.76%	1,058	5.27%
1912	2,371	12.39%	6,802	35.53%	9,971	52.08%
1916	8,722	45.00%	9,333	48.15%	1,329	6.86%
1920	17,288	58.44%	9,854	33.31%	2,439	8.25%
1924	17,516	56.18%	7,571	24.28%	6,090	19.53%
1928	30,949	61.30%	19,249	38.12%	292	0.58%
1932	17,982	42.25%	23,114	54.30%	1,468	3.45%
1936	21,758	40.06%	31,849	58.63%	711	1.31%
1940	22,914	46.41%	26,315	53.30%	139	0.28%
1944	21,995	51.81%	20,333	47.90%	122	0.29%
1948	23,535	58.13%	16,478	40.70%	472	1.17%
1952	28,861	61.71%	17,789	38.04%	119	0.25%
1956	28,583	62.46%	17,141	37.45%	41	0.09%
1960	27,568	55.31%	22,233	44.61%	40	0.08%
1964	17,046	37.68%	28,082	62.07%	116	0.26%
1968	22,366	53.38%	17,013	40.60%	2,520	6.01%
1972	25,912	64.16%	13,885	34.38%	588	1.46%
1976	19,283	49.60%	18,939	48.72%	654	1.68%
1980	20,608	56.79%	13,750	37.89%	1,932	5.32%
1984	22,109	61.13%	13,748	38.01%	308	0.85%
1988	20,207	58.07%	14,255	40.96%	338	0.97%
1992	15,057	42.07%	12,814	35.80%	7,921	22.13%
1996	13,551	41.82%	13,418	41.41%	5,431	16.76%
2000	18,142	54.56%	13,670	41.11%	1,442	4.34%
2004	22,262	59.95%	14,602	39.32%	270	0.73%
2008	19,018	55.75%	14,329	42.00%	767	2.25%
2012	19,518	58.51%	13,072	39.19%	766	2.30%
2016	25,427	68.89%	9,788	26.52%	1,692	4.58%
2020	28,975	68.28%	12,703	29.94%	757	1.78%
2024	30,240	69.30%	12,863	29.48%	532	1.22%

United States Senate election results for Northumberland County, Pennsylvania1
Year	Republican		Democratic		Third party(ies)	
Year	No.	%	No.	%	No.	%
1994	13,566	50.70%	12,012	44.90%	1,177	4.40%
2000	19,029	61.12%	11,208	36.00%	896	2.88%
2006	13,304	50.31%	13,140	49.69%	0	0.00%
2012	19,057	58.31%	12,904	39.48%	720	2.20%
2018	17,926	62.08%	10,524	36.45%	425	1.47%
2024	28,706	66.30%	13,432	31.03%	1,156	2.67%

United States Senate election results for Northumberland County, Pennsylvania3
Year	Republican		Democratic		Third party(ies)	
Year	No.	%	No.	%	No.	%
1992	17,076	49.77%	15,476	45.10%	1,761	5.13%
1998	13,529	61.17%	7,534	34.07%	1,053	4.76%
2004	22,076	63.23%	10,984	31.46%	1,855	5.31%
2010	16,032	62.02%	9,817	37.98%	0	0.00%
2016	21,826	61.42%	11,117	31.28%	2,592	7.29%
2022	20,992	63.82%	10,812	32.87%	1,091	3.32%

Pennsylvania Gubernatorial election results for Northumberland County
Year	Republican		Democratic		Third party(ies)	
Year	No.	%	No.	%	No.	%
1970	17,132	47.48%	17,994	49.87%	954	2.64%
1974	16,757	49.17%	17,075	50.10%	249	0.73%
1978	18,264	58.18%	12,513	39.86%	614	1.96%
1982	11,562	36.41%	19,890	62.64%	299	0.94%
1986	12,660	43.31%	16,337	55.89%	236	0.81%
1990	6,388	26.25%	17,948	73.75%	0	0.00%
1994	12,785	46.35%	10,633	38.55%	4,165	15.10%
1998	13,468	58.95%	7,051	30.86%	2,328	10.19%
2002	14,479	55.80%	10,774	41.52%	695	2.68%
2006	13,140	49.38%	13,470	50.62%	0	0.00%
2010	17,781	67.93%	8,393	32.07%	0	0.00%
2014	10,666	49.57%	10,852	50.43%	0	0.00%
2018	16,122	55.94%	12,135	42.10%	564	1.96%
2022	19,094	57.95%	12,052	36.58%	1,805	5.48%

As of November 7, 2022, there are 58,632 registered voters in Northumberland County.

- Republican: 31,682 (54.04%)
- Democratic: 18,515 (31.58%)
- Independent: 5,547 (9.46%)
- Third Party: 2,888 (4.93%)

While county-level politics tend to be competitive, Northumberland is a Republican county in most statewide elections. The margins of victory in the county for the Republican presidential candidate in 2000, 2004, and 2008 have been 13, 21, and 14 percentage points, respectively. Governor Ed Rendell narrowly carried it against Lynn Swann while Republican Rick Santorum narrowly carried it against Bob Casey in 2006. The only Democratic statewide candidate to carry the county in 2008 was incumbent Auditor General Jack Wagner. In 2011, the election of Stephen Bridy resulted in a three-way split among the county commissioners.

=== County commissioners ===
- Kymberley Best, Democrat
- Joseph Klebon, Republican
- Samuel Schiccatano, Republican

=== Other county offices ===
- Clerk of Courts and Prothonotary, Jamie Saleski, Republican
- Controller, Christopher L. Grayson, Democrat
- District Attorney, Anthony Matulewicz III, Republican
- Recorder of Deeds and Register of Wills, Christina Mertz, Republican
- Sheriff, Robert J.Wolfe, Republican
- Treasurer, Kevin P. Gilroy, Republican
- Coroner, James F. Kelley, Democrat

=== State House of Representatives ===
- Joanne Stehr, Republican, 107th district
- Lynda Schlegel-Culver, Republican, 108th district

=== State Senator ===
- John Gordner, Republican, 27th district

=== United States Representative ===
- Dan Meuser, Republican, 9th district

=== United States Senate ===
- John Fetterman, Democrat
- Dave McCormick, Republican

== Education ==
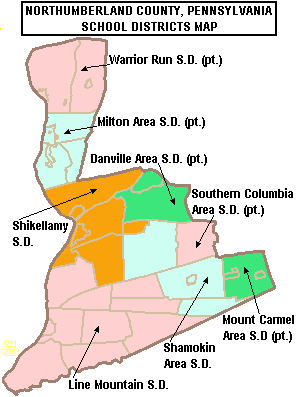
Map of Northumberland County, Pennsylvania Public School Districts

=== Public school districts ===
School districts include:

- Danville Area School District (also in Montour County)
- Line Mountain School District
- Milton Area School District (also in Union County)
- Mount Carmel Area School District (also in Columbia County)
- Shamokin Area School District
- Shikellamy School District
- Southern Columbia Area School District (also in Columbia County)
- Warrior Run School District (also in Montour and Union Counties)

=== Career Tech school ===
Northumberland County Career Technology Center located in Coal Township

=== Intermediate Unit ===
Central Susquehanna Intermediate Unit 16 – The primary service area consists of: Columbia, Montour, Northumberland, Snyder and Union counties in central Pennsylvania. Provides a wide variety of education related services to school districts, private and parochial schools and hame schooled students.

=== Independent schools ===
- Bethesda Alternative School, Milton 7–12th grade
- Keefertown Parochial School 1–8th grade
- Maranatha Mennonite Christian School K-12th grade
- Meadowbrook Christian Academy PreK-12th grade
- Meadowview Christian Academy PreK-10th grade
- Northumberland Christian School PreK-12th grade
- Northwestern Academy 5–12th grade
- Our Lady of Lourdes Regional School preK–12th grade
- Schwaben Creek School 1–8th grade
- Spring View Parochial School, Watsontown 1–9th grade
- St Louis De Monfort Academy, Herdon 7–12 grade
- Sunbury Christian Academy, Northumberland K-12th grade
- Sunny Slope Amish Parochial School 1–8th grade
- Telos Educational Services Tutoring Center, Montandon
- Transfiguration Elementary School, Shamokin PreK-8th grade
- Watsontown Christian Academy, Watsontown PreK-12th grade

== Communities ==
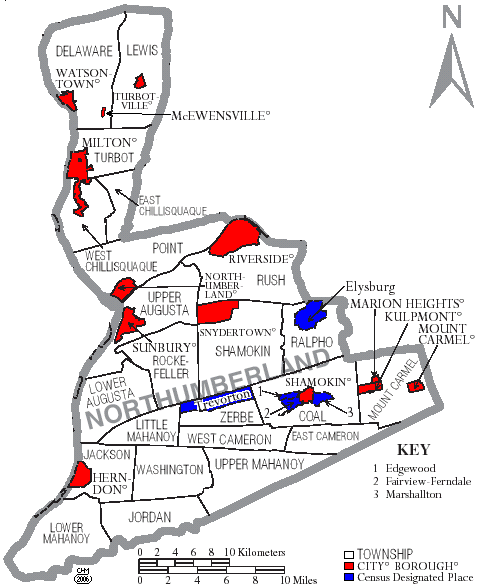
Map of Northumberland County, Pennsylvania with Municipal Labels showing Cities and Boroughs (red), Townships (white), and Census-designated places (blue).

Under Pennsylvania law, there are four types of incorporated municipalities: cities, boroughs, townships, and, in one case, a town. The following cities, boroughs, and townships are located in Northumberland County:

=== Cities ===
- Shamokin
- Sunbury (county seat)

=== Boroughs ===
- Herndon
- Kulpmont
- Marion Heights
- McEwensville
- Milton
- Mount Carmel
- Northumberland
- Riverside
- Snydertown
- Turbotville
- Watsontown

=== Townships ===
- Coal
- Delaware
- East Cameron
- East Chillisquaque
- Jackson
- Jordan
- Lewis
- Little Mahanoy
- Lower Augusta
- Lower Mahanoy
- Mount Carmel
- Point
- Ralpho
- Rockefeller
- Rush
- Shamokin
- Turbot
- Upper Augusta
- Upper Mahanoy
- Washington
- West Cameron
- West Chillisquaque
- Zerbe

=== Census-designated places ===
Census-designated places are geographical areas designated by the U.S. Census Bureau for the purposes of compiling demographic data. They are not actual jurisdictions under Pennsylvania law. Other unincorporated communities, such as villages, may be listed here as well.

- Atlas
- Dalmatia
- Dewart
- Edgewood
- Elysburg
- Fairview-Ferndale
- Kapp Heights
- Marshallton
- Montandon
- Ranshaw
- Strong
- Tharptown (Uniontown)
- Trevorton

=== Unincorporated communities ===
- Alaska
- Asherton
- Augustaville
- Bear Gap
- Bear Valley
- Big Mountain
- Boyd
- Boydtown
- Burnside
- Cabel
- Caketown
- Cameron
- Chillisquaque
- Chulasky
- Coal Run
- Colonial Park
- Connersville
- Deibler
- Delaware Run
- Diamondtown
- Dooleyville
- Dornsife
- Dunkelbergers
- East Lewisburg
- Excelsior
- Farnsworth
- Fisherdale
- Fishers Ferry
- Five Points
- Gowen City
- Greenback
- Greenbriar
- Hamilton
- Hebe
- Helfenstein
- Hickory Corners
- Hunter
- Kapp
- Keefers
- Keiser
- Kipps Run
- Kline Grove
- Kneass
- Knoebels Grove
- Kulps
- Lantz
- Leck Kill
- Line Mountain
- Lithia Springs
- Locust Gap
- Locust Summit
- Malta
- Mandata
- Mayfair
- Meadowview
- Merrian
- Mile Run
- Millers Crossroads
- Mount Carmel Junction
- Mount Pleasant
- Natalie
- North Hills
- Oak Park
- Oaklyn
- Otto
- Overlook
- Patricksburg
- Paxinos
- Point Breeze
- Potts Grove
- Purdytown
- Quitman
- Rebuck
- Red Cross
- Reed
- Resler
- Rushtown
- Sagon
- Selinsgrove Junction
- Seven Points
- Shady Acres
- Shamrock
- Snufftown
- South Danville
- Springtown
- Stonington
- Sunnyside
- Union Corner
- Urban
- Warrior Run
- West Cameron
- Wolfs Crossroads
- Wolverton
- Yordy

=== Population ranking ===
The population ranking of the following table is based on the 2010 census of Northumberland County.

† county seat

Rank	City/Town/etc.	Municipal type	Population (2010 Census)
1	† Sunbury	City	9,905
2	Shamokin	City	7,374
3	Milton	Borough	7,042
4	Mount Carmel	Borough	5,893
5	Northumberland	Borough	3,804
6	Kulpmont	Borough	2,924
7	Paxinos	CDP	2,467
8	Edgewood	CDP	2,384
9	Watsontown	Borough	2,351
10	Elysburg	CDP	2,194
11	Fairview-Ferndale	CDP	2,139
12	Riverside	Borough	1,932
13	Trevorton	CDP	1,834
14	Dewart	CDP	1,471
15	Marshallton	CDP	1,441
16	Montandon	CDP	903
17	Kapp Heights	CDP	863
18	Atlas	CDP	809
19	Turbotville	Borough	705
20	Marion Heights	Borough	611
21	Ranshaw	CDP	510
22	Tharptown (Uniontown)	CDP	498
23	Dalmatia	CDP	488
24	Snydertown	Borough	339
25	Herndon	Borough	324
26	McEwensville	Borough	279
27	Strong	CDP	147

== See also ==
- National Register of Historic Places listings in Northumberland County, Pennsylvania
