= Shamokin Area School District =

School district in Pennsylvania

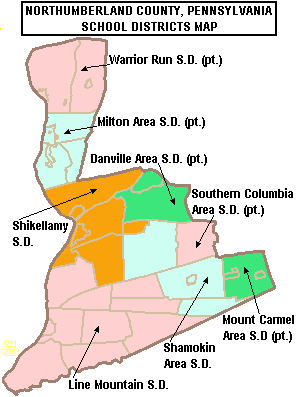

Address
- 2000 West State Street Coal Township, Northumberland County, Pennsylvania, 17866-2807; United States

District information
- Type: Public

Students and staff
- District mascot: Indians
- Colors: Purple/White

Other information
- Website: https://www.indians.k12.pa.us/

Shamokin Area School District is a small, rural public school district located in Coal Township, Pennsylvania, US. The Shamokin Area School District community consists of the city of Shamokin and the townships of Coal, East Cameron and Shamokin. It is located at the southern end of the anthracite coal region in Northumberland County in central Pennsylvania with a population of approximately 21,000. According to the US Census Bureau, by 2010, the district's population declined to 20,876 people. The educational attainment levels for the Shamokin Area School District population (25 years old and over) were 82.4% high school graduates and 9.3% college graduates. The district is one of the 500 public school districts of Pennsylvania.

According to the Pennsylvania Budget and Policy Center, 59.5% of the district's pupils lived at 185% or below the Federal Poverty level as shown by their eligibility for the federal free or reduced price school meal programs in 2012. In 2013, the Pennsylvania Department of Education reported that 11 students in the Shamokin Area School District were homeless. In 2009, the district residents' per capita income was $14,514, while the median family income was $34,189 a year. In the Commonwealth, the median family income declined to $49,501 and the United States median family income was $49,445, in 2010. In Northumberland County, the median household income was $41,208. By 2013, the median household income in the United States rose to $52,100.

According to Shamokin Area School District administrative officials, during the 2005–06 school year, the district provided basic educational services to 2,443 pupils. It employed: 10 administrators, 167 teachers, and 103 full-time and part-time support personnel. In 2010, Shamokin Area School District reported an enrollment of 2,759 pupils. The district employed: 166 teachers, 126 full-time and part-time support personnel, and increased to 12 administrators during the 2009–10 school year. Shamokin Area School District received $15.7 million in state funding in the 2009–10 school year. In 2013, Shamokin Area School District reported an enrollment of 2,507 pupils. The district employed: 193 teachers, 53 full-time and part-time support personnel, and increased to 11 administrators during the 2013–14 school year. Shamokin Area School District received $16,927,439 in state funding in the 2013–14 school year which was 61% of the district's budget.

The Shamokin Area School District operates four schools: Shamokin Area High School, Shamokin Area Middle School, Shamokin Area Intermediate School and Shamokin Area Elementary School and Annex. The high school and middle school share a single building. The intermediate school and elementary school also occupy a single building. In 2015, more than 165 Shamokin Area pupils attend full-time cyber school. The district does not offer its own cyber school program. The pupils may attend any of the 13 cyber schools operating in Pennsylvania in 2015, including locally operated SusQ Cyber Charter School. Shamokin Area High School students may choose to attend Northumberland County Career Technology Center for training in the trades.

Special education services are provided by the district personnel and the Central Susquehanna Intermediate Unit CSIU16, which provides the district with a wide variety of services like: specialized education for disabled students and hearing; state mandated recognizing and reporting child abuse training; speech and visual disability services; criminal background checks processing for prospective employees and professional development for staff and faculty.

== Facilities ==
The middle/high school, housing grades 7 through 12, was constructed in 1973–1975. The multi-floor building houses a 1280-seat auditorium, a 3000-seat gymnasium, and a regulation pool with spectator seating. This building was renovated in 1995–1996 to provide additional classroom space to accommodate grades 7 and 8. The building's HVAC system was renovated in this project, and modifications were made to meet ADA regulations. The former middle school building was sold to a county agency at the conclusion of the renovation project in 1996. It is currently being used by the county as a career development and arts center.

The elementary school was constructed in 1980, and houses grades 1 through 6. It is also the home of several special needs classes administered by the local intermediate unit (IU16). The building's HVAC system was renovated in 1990. The elementary houses a large combination auditorium/gymnasium, a tiered-seating vocal music classroom, a band and orchestra suite, and a library.

The elementary annex building was constructed 1959 as a vocational education facility for the district. This building was recently renovated to meet ADA regulations and houses grades K4 (kindergarten for four-year-olds), K5 kindergarten, and first grade. The building also houses administrative offices and a large gymnasium to provide accommodations for additional athletic activities.

Both the secondary and elementary schools have extensive libraries, and participate in the Access Pennsylvania system. A mini-library is available at the annex building with holdings from the elementary library that are age appropriate for students located in the building. Library automation and circulation software is used in both libraries, with networked computers and printers for use by students and faculty.

A large LAN on the main campus of the district serves the district administrative offices, the elementary school, and the middle/high school. A LAN is also present in the elementary annex building. A WAN/VPN connection links the remote elementary annex building to the main campus LAN to better utilize district resources and avoid duplication of services. The district aggressively pursues federal and state grant monies to fund its technology initiatives. A closed-circuit television distribution system is also provided for the elementary and secondary buildings, with access points in every classroom. All television programming originates from a sophisticated television studio in the middle/high school, and includes digital video production equipment.

== Extracurriculars ==
Shamokin Area School District offers a variety of clubs, activities and an extensive sports program. In 2014, the district reported spending over $580,000 for student activities (excluding transportation and facility costs). In 2016–17, spending on extracurriculars had grown to $687,813. Eligibility for participation in extracurricular activities is determined by the school board and the Pennsylvania Interscholastic Athletic Association. The Shamokin Area School District is a Division I member of the Pennsylvania Heartland Athletic Conference.

The district maintains an extensive outdoor athletic complex. Kemp Memorial Stadium is a large football and track complex with a seating capacity of 6000, with artificial turf and lighting for night games. The outdoor athletic complex also features practice fields, a lighted soccer stadium, and a baseball field dedicated to Douglas Dobson. The athletic facilities of the district are utilized heavily not only by the home teams, but also by various league organizations for hosting playoff games and events. A well-equipped weight room and athletic training facilities are located in the middle/high school. The plastic turf field was installed in 2005 at a cost of $648,991.23 to the taxpayers.

=== Sports ===
The sports programs participate in the Pennsylvania Heartland Athletic Conference and the Pennsylvania Interscholastic Athletic Association. The Pennsylvania Heartland Athletic Conference is a voluntary association of 25 PIAA High Schools within the central Pennsylvania region. Coaches receive compensation as outlined in the teachers' union contract. When athletic competition exceeds the regular season, additional compensation is paid. Coaching compensation increases the employee's state pension benefits.

The district funds:

Boys

- Baseball - AAA
- Basketball - AAA
- Cross Country - AA
- Football - AAA
- Soccer - AA
- Swimming and Diving - AA
- Track and Field - AA
- Wrestling - AA

Girls

- Basketball - AAA
- Cheer - AAAA *new 2014
- Cross Country - AA
- Soccer (Fall) - AA
- Softball - AAA
- Swimming and Diving - AA
- Track and Field - AAA
- Volleyball - AA

Middle School Sports

Boys

- Baseball
- Basketball
- Cross Country
- Football
- Track and Field
- Wrestling

Girls

- Basketball
- Cross Country
- Soccer (Fall)
- Softball
- Track and Field

According to PIAA School Directory July 2015
