= SusQ Cyber Charter School =

School district in Pennsylvania

Coordinates: 41.00139°N 76.45771°W

SusQ-Cyber Charter School

Location
- 240 Market Street, Suite 15, Bloomsburg, Columbia County, Pennsylvania 17815; United States

Information
- Type: Public cyber charter school
- Motto: Pennsylvania's First Cyber Charter School
- Established: 1998
- Founder: Berwick Area School District, Bloomsburg Area School District and Milton Area School District in conjunction with the Board of Trustees
- Closed: 2022
- School board: locally selected Board of Trustees
- Oversight: Central Susquehanna Intermediate Unit 16, Pennsylvania Department of Education
- Principal: Patricia Leighow, Chief Executive Officer (2014)
- Staff: 11 non teaching staff members
- Faculty: 15 teachers (2014), 15 teachers (2011)
- Grades: 9th through 12th
- Enrollment: 103 pupils (2016)
- Language: English
- Accreditation: Pennsylvania Department of Education
- Website: http://www.susqcyber.org/

Susq-Cyber Charter School was a small, public, cyber charter school whose headquarters were located in Bloomsburg, Pennsylvania. The school offered grades 9th through 12th. Students residing in any region of Pennsylvania were able to enroll in the school. The curriculum and instruction were internet based. Teachers were available to pupils, during traditional school day hours via phone and internet. Susq-Cyber Charter School was one of 14 public, cyber charter schools operating in Pennsylvania in 2014. In 2016, enrollment was reported as 103 pupils in 9th through 12th grades. All students were assigned a Distance Learning Monitor who checked their progress and remained in contact with them through emails, on-line chats through the programs or by phone. Teachers were available to tutor students, to review their problem areas, and to set up plans for achievement that the student could follow between tutoring sessions. Tutoring sessions were held on line using Elluminate or with teachers either at the testing centers or at various locations throughout the state which included libraries in the students' home area, at university library facilities, or at community centers.

== History ==
In 1997, five local school districts met with members of the Central Susquehanna Intermediate Unit (CSIU16) to discuss establishing a cyber entity. Three of the original five school districts approved the charter that created the SusQ-Cyber Charter School in 1998 (Berwick Area School District, Bloomsburg Area School District and Milton Area School District). In 2002, Pennsylvania Act 88 required all charter schools to be chartered by the Pennsylvania Department of Education. The overriding focus was for the school to deliver an educational program to primarily at-risk high school students who are trying to obtain their high school diploma. In 2003, the SusQ-Cyber Charter School was re-chartered as a public school district for grades 9-12 for an additional 5 years. For its first five years, the school was open exclusively to students in the CSIU16 region. In 2005, enrollment opened to all Pennsylvania students who met the residence and age requirements of Pennsylvania law.

Initially, the school provided courses that were not available in their traditional district's high school. Over time the program evolved to serve students who were underserved by the traditional local public schools. This included students who were pregnant and students who needed to work to support themselves, for example. Other students had medical problems such as auto-immune deficiency, cancer, or asthma that led to them missing a significant number of schools days, due to illness or therapy appointments. Another group of students were gifted. They sought cyber school after leaving their traditional schools to accelerate their studies. They may have entered college with advanced standing, but have a course requirement outstanding to earn their high school diploma. Some public school principals reported referring potential drop out to the school to finish their public education and earn a high school diploma.

SusQ-Cyber Charter School ceased operations effective 31 August 2022, citing declining enrollment as the reason for the closure. SusQ-Cyber was also facing non-renewal of their operational charter by the Pennsylvania Department of Education.

== See also ==
- Charter schools in the United States
- Notice of Charges in Support of Nonrenewal of Charter - SusQ-Cyber Charter School
