= Coal Township, Northumberland County, Pennsylvania =

Township in Pennsylvania, US

Coordinates: 40°47′00″N 76°29′28″W

Coal Township, Pennsylvania
- Township
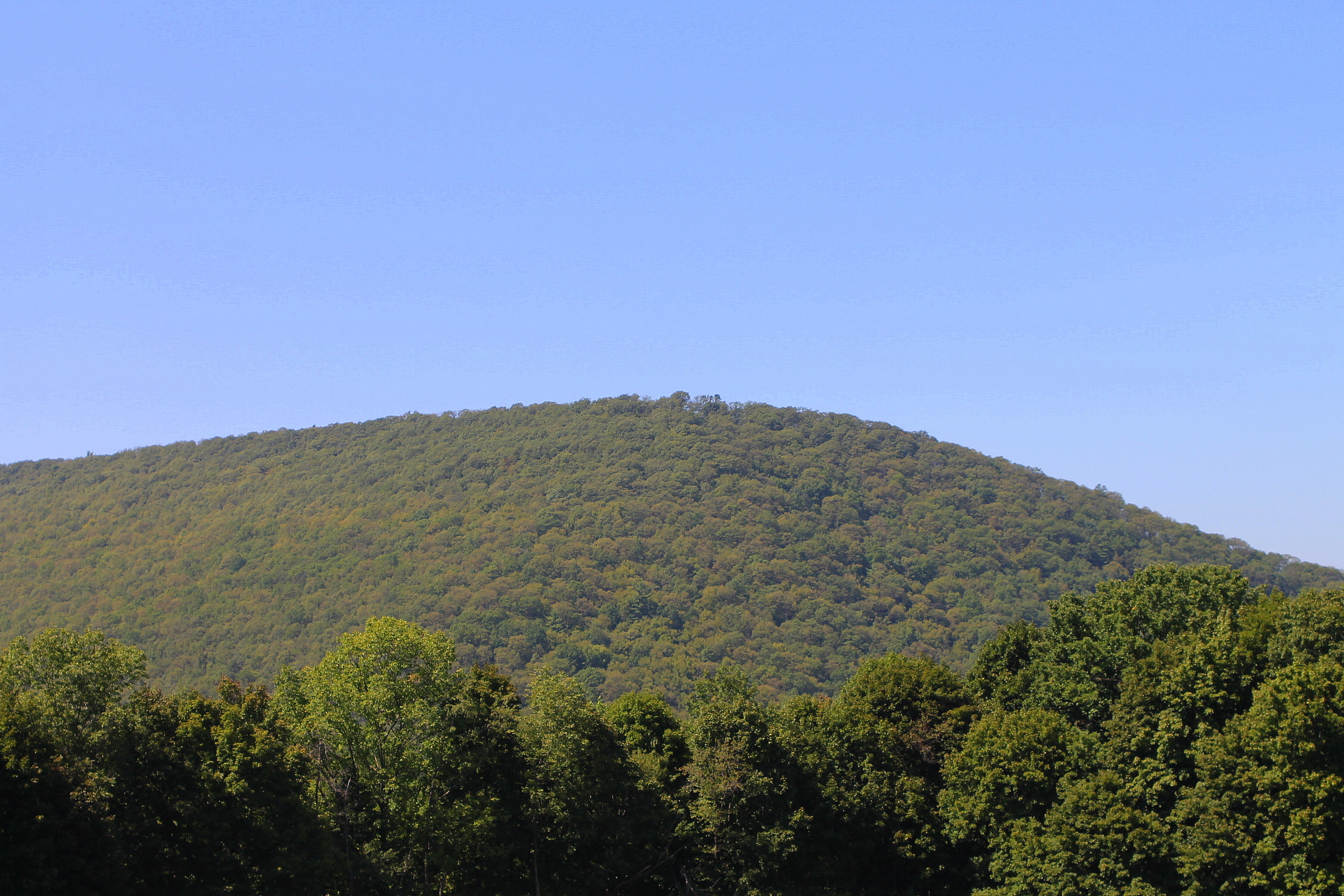
- Ridge in Coal Township

- Flag

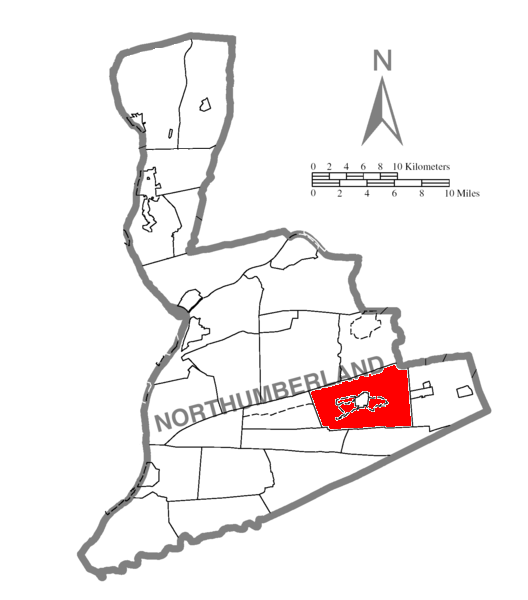
- Map of Northumberland County, Pennsylvania highlighting Coal Township

- Map of Northumberland County, Pennsylvania
- Country: United States
- State: Pennsylvania
- County: Northumberland
- Incorporated: 1837

Government
  - Type: Board of Supervisors

Area
  - Total: 26.46 sq mi (68.53 km^{2})
  - Land: 26.36 sq mi (68.27 km^{2})
  - Water: 0.097 sq mi (0.25 km^{2})

Population (2020)
  - Total: 10,136 ▼
  - Estimate (2022): 9,462
  - Density: 392.7/sq mi (151.61/km^{2})
- Time zone: UTC-5 (Eastern (EST))
  - Summer (DST): UTC-4 (EDT)
- ZIP code: 17866
- Area code: 570
- FIPS code: 42-097-14536

Coal Township is a township in Northumberland County, Pennsylvania, United States. The population at the 2020 Census was 10,136, which was a decline from the figure of 10,383 tabulated in 2010.

== Geography ==
According to the United States Census Bureau, the township has a total area of 26.5 square miles (69 km^{2}), of which 26.5 square miles (69 km^{2}) is land and 0.04 square miles (0.10 km^{2}) (0.15%) is water. It contains the census-designated places of Edgewood, Fairview-Ferndale, Marshallton, Ranshaw, and Tharptown/Uniontown.

== Demographics ==
Historical population
Census	Pop.	Note	%±
2000	10,628		—
2010	10,383		−2.3%
2020	10,136		−2.4%
2022 (est.)	9,462		−6.6%
U.S. Decennial Census

As of the census of 2000, there were 10,628 people, 3,732 households, and 2,369 families residing in the township. The population density was 401.2 inhabitants per square mile (154.9/km^{2}). There were 4,233 housing units at an average density of 159.8 per square mile (61.7/km^{2}). The racial makeup of the township was 89.44% White, 9.02% African American, 0.07% Native American, 0.26% Asian, 0.61% from other races, and 0.59% from two or more races. Hispanic or Latino of any race were 2.10% of the population.

There were 3,732 households, out of which 23.5% had children under the age of 18 living with them, 48.4% were married couples living together, 10.5% had a female householder with no husband present, and 36.5% were non-families. 33.1% of all households were made up of individuals, and 19.3% had someone living alone who was 65 years of age or older. The average household size was 2.26 and the average family size was 2.84.

In the township the population was spread out, with 17.5% under the age of 18, 8.6% from 18 to 24, 31.0% from 25 to 44, 21.8% from 45 to 64, and 21.1% who were 65 years of age or older. The median age was 40 years. For every 100 females, there were 127.9 males. For every 100 females age 18 and over, there were 128.1 males.

The median income for a household in the township was $26,547, and the median income for a family was $34,339. Males had a median income of $25,638 versus $19,387 for females. The per capita income for the township was $15,329. About 9.1% of families and 11.9% of the population were below the poverty line, including 11.2% of those under age 18 and 11.6% of those age 65 or over.
