= Shamokin Creek =

Shamokin Creek Great Shamokin Creek, Middle Branch Shamokin Creek
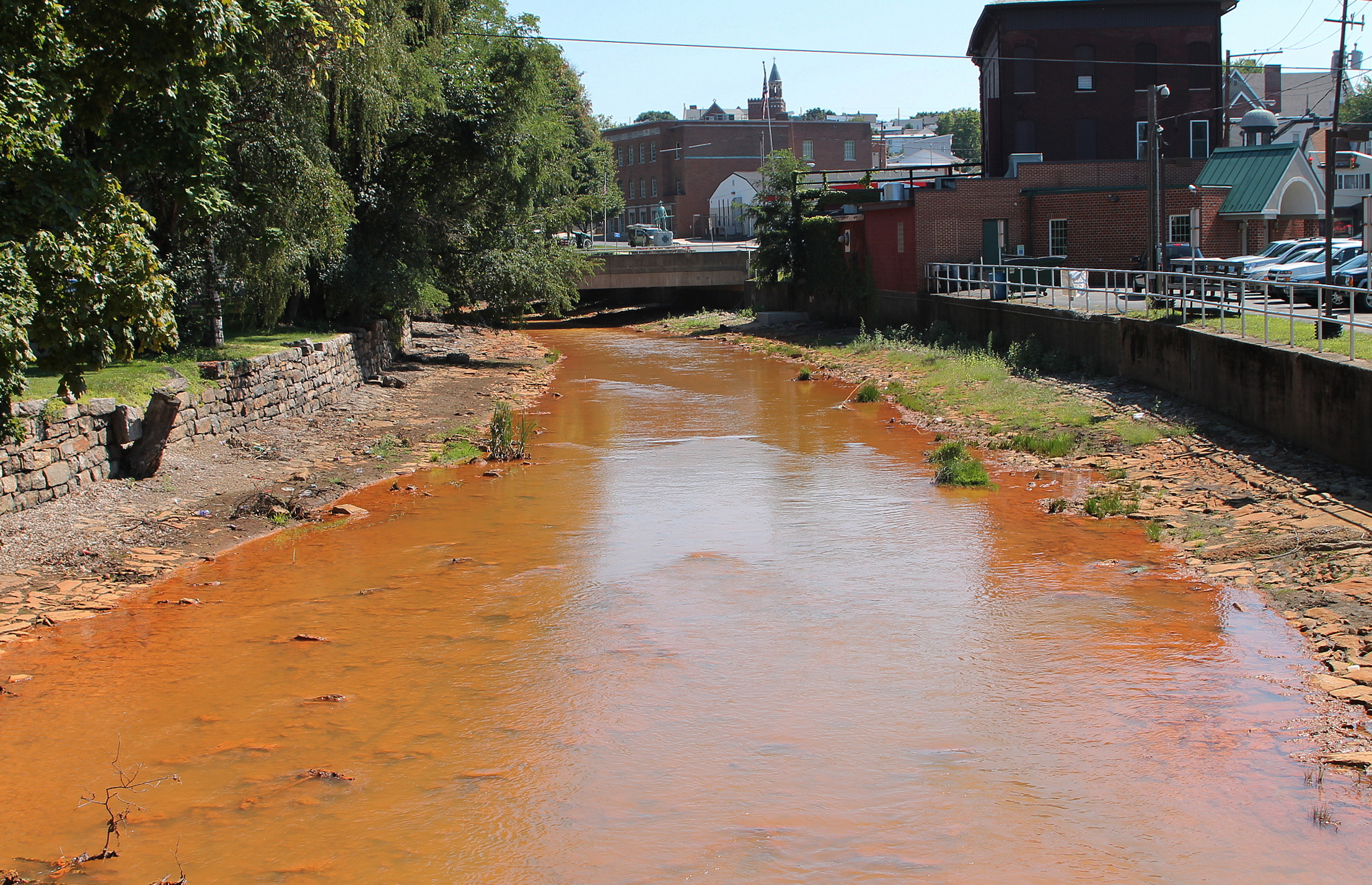
- Shamokin Creek looking upstream in Shamokin, Pennsylvania
- Etymology: Delaware word for "Eel Creek"

Physical characteristics
- Source
  - location: eastern edge of Mount Carmel, Northumberland County, Pennsylvania
- Mouth
  - location: Susquehanna River on the border between Upper Augusta Township, Northumberland County, Pennsylvania and Sunbury, Northumberland County, Pennsylvania
  - coordinates: 40°50′31″N 76°48′21″W
- Length: 32.4 mi (52.1 km)
- Basin size: 137 mi^{2} (350 km^{2})
- Discharge
  - average: 34 cubic feet per second (0.96 m^{3}/s) (Note: One measurement at Sunbury in August 1999); 301 cubic feet per second (8.5 m^{3}/s) (Note: One measurement at Sunbury in March 2000)

Basin features
- Progression: Susquehanna River → Chesapeake Bay
- Tributaries
  - left: Locust Creek, Carbon Run, Furnace Run Bennys Run, Lick Creek, Little Shamokin Creek
  - right: North Branch Shamokin Creek, Quaker Run, Coal Run, Trout Run, Millers Run

Shamokin Creek (also known as Great Shamokin Creek or Middle Branch Shamokin Creek) is a tributary of the Susquehanna River in Northumberland County, Pennsylvania, in the United States. It is approximately 32.4 miles (52.1 km) long and flows through Mount Carmel, Mount Carmel Township, Coal Township, Shamokin, Ralpho Township, Shamokin Township, Snydertown, Upper Augusta Township, and Sunbury. The watershed of the creek has an area of 137 square miles (350 km^{2}). It experiences significant impacts by abandoned mine drainage and many abandoned mine drainage discharges are in its watershed. Various other impairments also affect parts of the creek's watershed. Shamokin Creek is in the Appalachian Mountains section of the Ridge and Valley physiographic province. Rock formations consisting of sandstone, shale, and anthracite deposits occur in the watershed.

The main land uses in the watershed of Shamokin Creek are forested land and agricultural land, with barren land and urban land making up only a few percent of the watershed. However, in the upper 54 square miles (140 km^{2}), forested land and mine spoils dominate, urban land is less prevalent, and agricultural land is virtually nonexistent. Coal mining was being done in the watershed of Shamokin Creek by the early 1800s. In the early 1900s, coal mining, foundries, iron works, nail production, agriculture, silk mills, and woolen mills were the main industries in the watershed. In the 1990s and 2000s, many grants for restoring the creek have been received by various organizations.

The main stem of Shamokin Creek is designated as a Warmwater Fishery and a Migratory Fishery. The creek is devoid of fish life in its upper reaches, but several fish species have been observed further downstream. The upper reaches of the creek also lack macroinvertebrate life. The lower 21.6 miles (34.8 km) of the creek are navigable by canoe for part of the year. Pennsylvania State Game Lands Number 165 is also partially in the watershed.

== Course ==
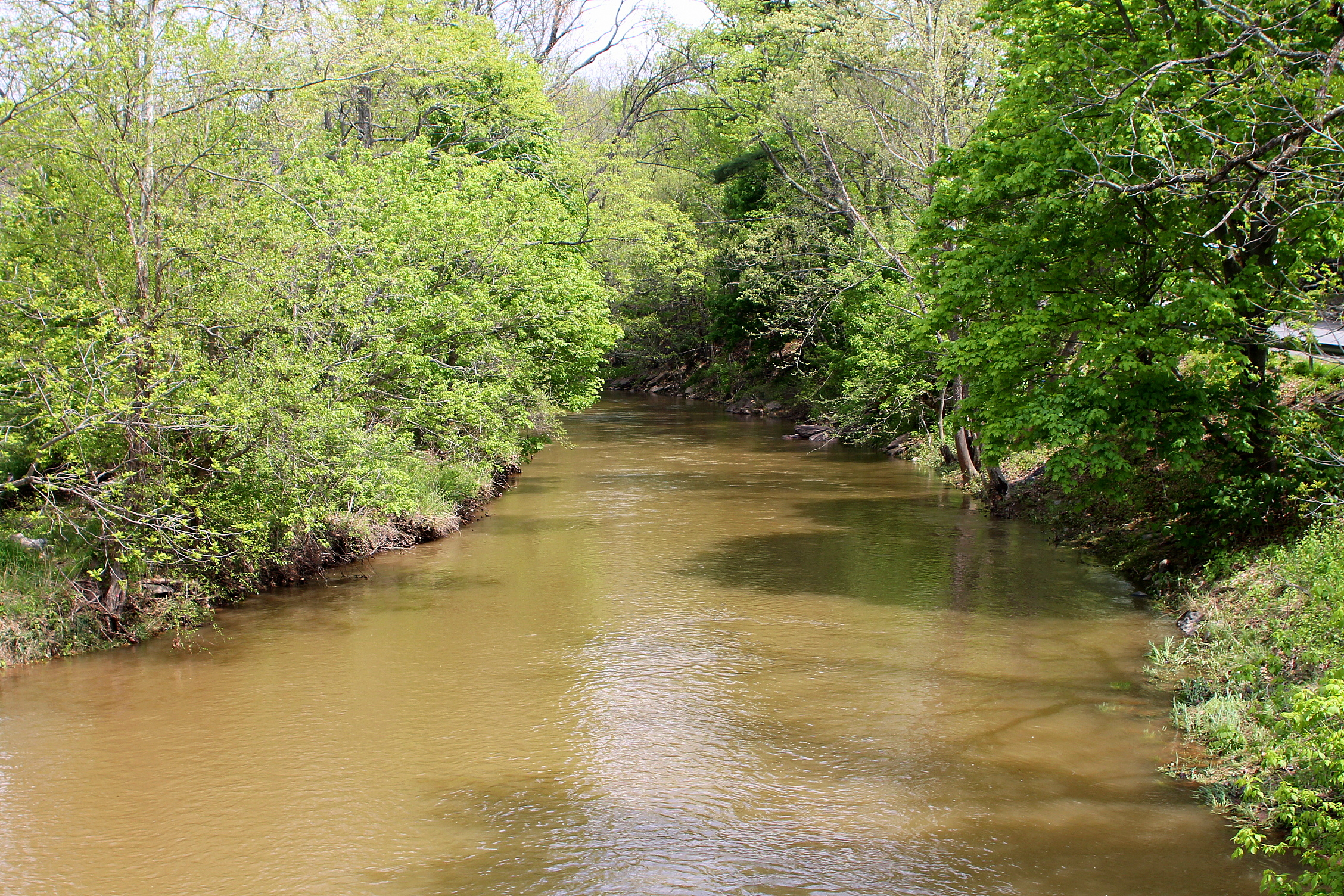
Shamokin Creek looking downstream west of Elysburg, Pennsylvania

Shamokin Creek begins on the eastern edge of Mount Carmel. It flows northwest for a few tenths of a mile before turning west-southwest, crossing Pennsylvania Route 61, and entering Mount Carmel Township. Here, the creek turns southwest for a few tenths of a mile before turning west-southwest again and receiving the tributary North Branch Shamokin Creek from the right. It then turns southwest for several tenths of a mile and receives the tributary Locust Creek from the left. At this point, the creek turns west-southwest for more than a mile, entering a valley and passing into Coal Township. Soon after entering this township, it turns in a northwesterly direction, flowing alongside Pennsylvania Route 901 and leaving the valley. At this point, the creek receives the tributary Quaker Run from the right and turns west-southwest along the border of the census-designated place of Marshalton. After several tenths of a mile, it turns south-southwest before turning north-northwest and entering Shamokin. Several tenths of a mile after entering Shamokin, the creek receives the tributary Coal Run from the right and turns west-southwest. A few tenths of a mile further downstream, it crosses Pennsylvania Route 125 and receives Carbon Run and Furnace Run from the left and turns north, exiting Shamokin and reentering Coal Township.

Upon entering Coal Township, Shamokin Creek crosses Pennsylvania Route 61 and continues flowing north, passing through a water gap in Big Mountain. The creek continues heading north near Pennsylvania Route 61 and passes along the border of Tharptown/Uniontown, Pennsylvania. Here, it receives Trout Run from the right and turns west for several tenths of a mile, crossing Pennsylvania Route 61. The creek then turns north and passes through a water gap in Little Mountain. In this water gap, the creek exits Coal Township and begins flowing along the border between Ralpho Township and Shamokin Township. It continues flowing north for several miles though a valley and alongside Pennsylvania Route 61, receiving Bennys Run from the left, Millers Run from the right, and Lick Run from the left.

More than a mile after receiving Lick Run, Shamokin Creek turns in a westerly direction for many miles. In this reach, it flows through a much broader and deeper valley. It passes through Shamokin Township and Snydertown before entering Upper Augusta Township. Here, the creek flows in a west-southwesterly direction for several miles before turning south and receiving Little Shamokin Creek, its last named tributary, from the left. Several tenths of a mile further downstream, it flows west for several tenths of a mile, flowing along the border between Sunbury and Upper Augusta Township. The creek then turns southwest for several tenths of a mile and continues flowing along the border until it reaches its confluence with the Susquehanna River.

Shamokin Creek joins the Susquehanna River 122.90 miles (197.79 km) upriver of its mouth.

=== Tributaries ===
Shamokin Creek has eleven named direct tributaries, including Little Shamokin Creek, Carbon Run, Coal Run, Bennys Run, Locust Creek, and others. Little Shamokin Creek joins Shamokin Creek 2.58 miles (4.15 km) upstream of its mouth and drains an area of 29.0 square miles (75 km^{2}). Carbon Run joins Shamokin Creek 21.62 miles (34.79 km) upstream of its mouth and drains an area of 8.78 square miles (22.7 km^{2}). Coal Run joins Shamokin Creek 22.54 miles (36.27 km) upstream of its mouth and drains an area of 6.25 square miles (16.2 km^{2}). Bennys Run joins Shamokin Creek 18.20 miles (29.29 km) upstream of its mouth and drains an area of 6.12 square miles (15.9 km^{2}). Locust Creek joins Shamokin Creek 28.88 miles (46.48 km) upstream of its mouth and drains an area of 5.75 square miles (14.9 km^{2}).

== Hydrology ==
The entire length of Shamokin Creek is designated as impaired due to high levels of metals from abandoned mine drainage. In addition to abandoned mine drainage, the creek is impacted by sewage, disruption of the area's natural hydrology, and probably nutrient pollution, sediment, and low levels of dissolved oxygen. Non-polluted streams in the creek's lower reaches dilute the pollution by more than doubling Shamokin Creek's discharge. However, impairments remain as far downstream as the creek's mouth in Sunbury. There are dozens of abandoned mine drainage discharges in the watershed's upper reaches. Some discharges lead into the watershed of Mahanoy Creek, which has some mine drainage discharges that flow back into the Shamokin Creek watershed.

The pH of Shamokin Creek as far downstream as Sunbury can be as low as 4.2. The pH in the creek's upper reaches is 6.1 to 6.6, depending on the site and the time of year, while in Shamokin, it can range from 6.3 to 6.5; below Shamokin, it can range from 5.9 to 6.3; and at Sunbury, it can range from 4.0 to 6.5.

In August 1999, Shamokin Creek was dry near the confluence of North Branch Shamokin Creek, but near Quaker Run, its discharge was 12 cubic feet per second (0.34 m^{3}/s). In Shamokin, the discharge was 19 cubic feet per second (0.54 m^{3}/s) and slightly further downstream, it was 30 cubic feet per second (0.85 m^{3}/s). Near its mouth, the creek's discharge was 34 cubic feet per second (0.96 m^{3}/s). The creek's discharge was considerably higher in March 2000, being 0.54 cubic feet per second (0.015 m^{3}/s) near North Branch Shamokin Creek, 34 cubic feet per second (0.96 m^{3}/s) near Quaker Run, 59 to 64 cubic feet per second (1.7 to 1.8 m^{3}/s) at Shamokin (depending on the site), 84 to 85 cubic feet per second (2.4 to 2.4 m^{3}/s) below Shamokin (again, depending on the site), and 301 cubic feet per second (8.5 m^{3}/s) at Sunbury.

The concentrations of manganese and iron in the upper reaches of Shamokin Creek are 2.72 and 9.74 milligrams per liter (0.00272 and 0.00973 oz/cu ft), while the daily loads are 69.2 and 247.8 pounds (31.4 and 112.4 kg). Closer to Shamokin, the iron concentration ranges from 17.90 to 18.58 milligrams per liter (0.01788 to 0.01856 oz/cu ft), depending on the site, while the manganese concentration ranges from 3.09 to 3.62 milligrams per liter (0.00309 to 0.00362 oz/cu ft). The daily loads are 4,000.9 to 6,207.6 pounds (1,814.8 to 2,815.7 kg) for iron and 809.1 to 1,095.8 pounds (367.0 to 497.0 kg) for manganese. Downstream of Shamokin, the iron concentration steadily decreases from 19.55 milligrams per liter (0.01953 oz/cu ft) at site SC5 to 1.05 milligrams per liter (0.00105 oz/cu ft) at site SC8 at Sunbury. These values equate to daily loads of 7,493.6 and 725.7 pounds (3,399.0 and 329.2 kg). The manganese concentration decreases less dramatically, from 3.62 milligrams per liter (0.00362 oz/cu ft) (1,387.6 pounds (629.4 kg) per day) at SC5 to 2.01 milligrams per liter (0.00201 oz/cu ft) (1,389.2 pounds (630.1 kg) per day) at Sunbury. The creek's streambed is lined with iron in some reaches. The creek has high concentrations of nickel.

In and around Shamokin, the aluminum concentration of Shamokin Creek ranges from 1.16 to 2.51 milligrams per liter (0.00116 to 0.00251 oz/cu ft), depending on the site. This equates to a daily load of 371.3 to 561.0 milligrams per liter (0.3709 to 0.5604 oz/cu ft). In the creek's middle reaches, the concentration decreases from 2.15 milligrams per liter (0.00215 oz/cu ft) (824.1 pounds (373.8 kg) per day) at site SC5 to 1.35 milligrams per liter (0.00135 oz/cu ft) (756.6 pounds (343.2 kg) per day) at site SC7 to 0.37 milligrams per liter (0.00037 oz/cu ft) (255.7 pounds (116.0 kg) per day) at Sunbury.

In August 1999 and March 2000, the sulfate concentration in the upper reaches of Shamokin Creek ranged from 45 to 220 milligrams per liter (0.045 to 0.220 oz/cu ft), depending on the site. At Shamokin, it ranged from 230 to 250 milligrams per liter (0.23 to 0.25 oz/cu ft), and below Shamokin, it ranged from 260 to 310 milligrams per liter (0.26 to 0.31 oz/cu ft). The sulfate concentration in Sunbury ranged from 63 to 280 milligrams per liter (0.063 to 0.280 oz/cu ft).

In August 1999 and March 2000, the nitrogen concentration in the upper reaches of Shamokin Creek ranged from 0.95 to 1.2 milligrams per liter (0.00095 to 0.00120 oz/cu ft), depending on the site. At Shamokin, it ranged from 0.86 to 0.98 milligrams per liter (0.00086 to 0.00098 oz/cu ft), and below Shamokin, it ranged from 1 to 1.1 milligrams per liter (0.00100 to 0.00110 oz/cu ft). The nitrogen concentration in Sunbury ranged from 1.8 to 3.1 milligrams per liter (0.0018 to 0.0031 oz/cu ft). The concentration of sodium was 7.8 milligrams per liter (0.0078 oz/cu ft), while the phosphorus concentration was 60 micrograms per liter (6.0×10^{−5} oz/cu ft) and the chloride concentration was 11 milligrams per liter (0.011 oz/cu ft).

In 1917, the Water Resources Inventory Report referred to Shamokin Creek as the worst stream in the Coal Region due to the mine water, culm deposits, and other problems. During this time period, the culm deposits were so extensive that it was one of the few creeks where it was commercially viable to recover coal from its streambed. The creek was black throughout its entire length and typically sluggish in its upper reaches, though it had fast reaches. However, it was clear at its headwaters.

== Geography, geology, and climate ==
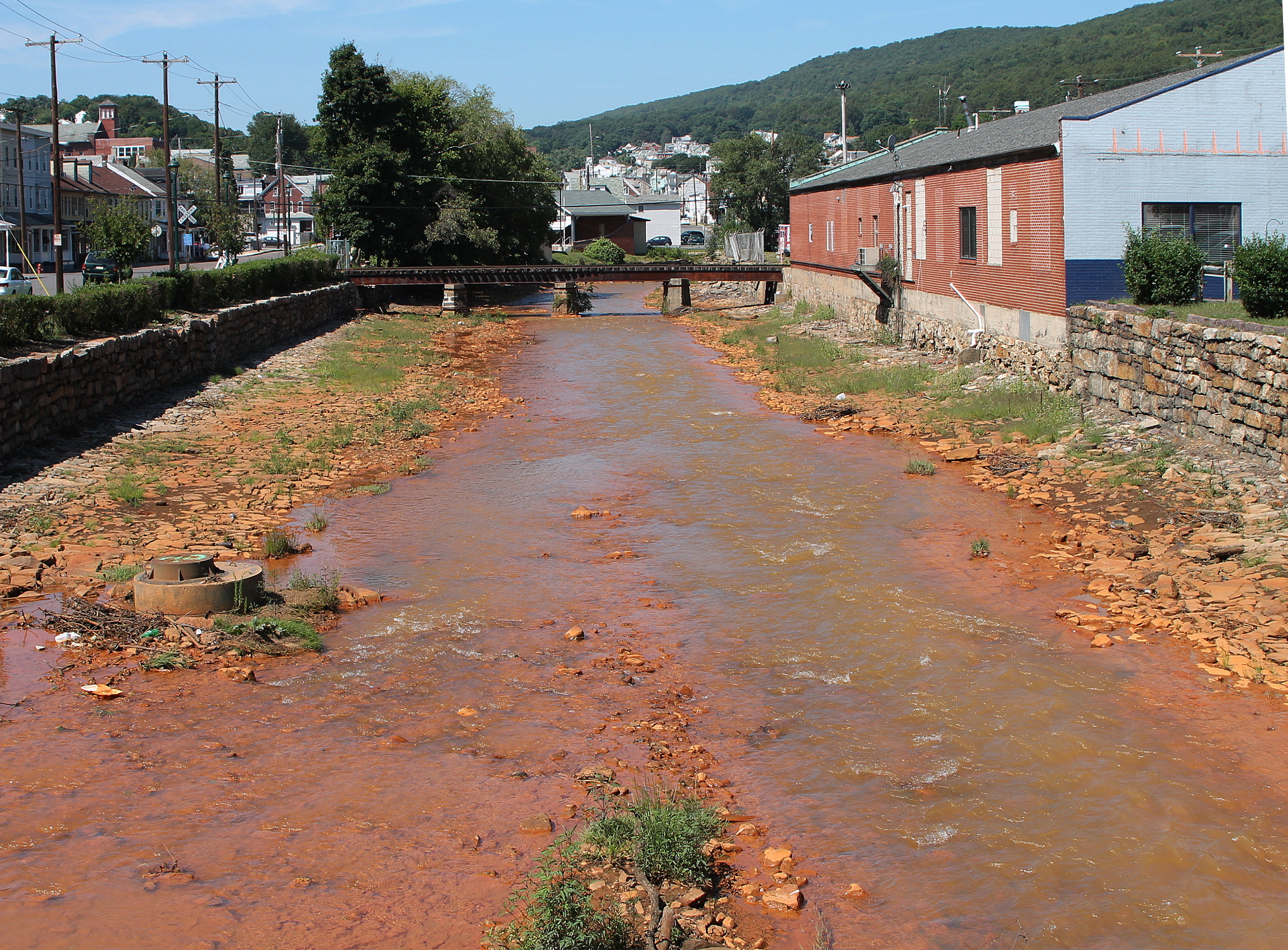
Shamokin Creek in Shamokin

The elevation near the mouth of Shamokin Creek is 427 feet (130 m) above sea level. The elevation of the creek's source is between 1,060 and 1,080 feet (320 and 330 m) above sea level. Between Mount Carmel and Shamokin, the gradient of the creek is 34.8 feet per mile (6.59 m/km). Between Shamokin and the creek's mouth, this decreases to 13.5 feet per mile (2.56 m/km).

The watershed of Shamokin Creek is in the Appalachian Mountains section of the Ridge and Valley physiographic province. The lower reaches of the watershed are in the Northern Shale Valleys and Slopes Ecoregion, while the upper reaches are in the Anthracite Coal Ecoregion. In the early 1900s, vast culm deposits along the creek's banks caused it to lack a defined channel until Snydertown.

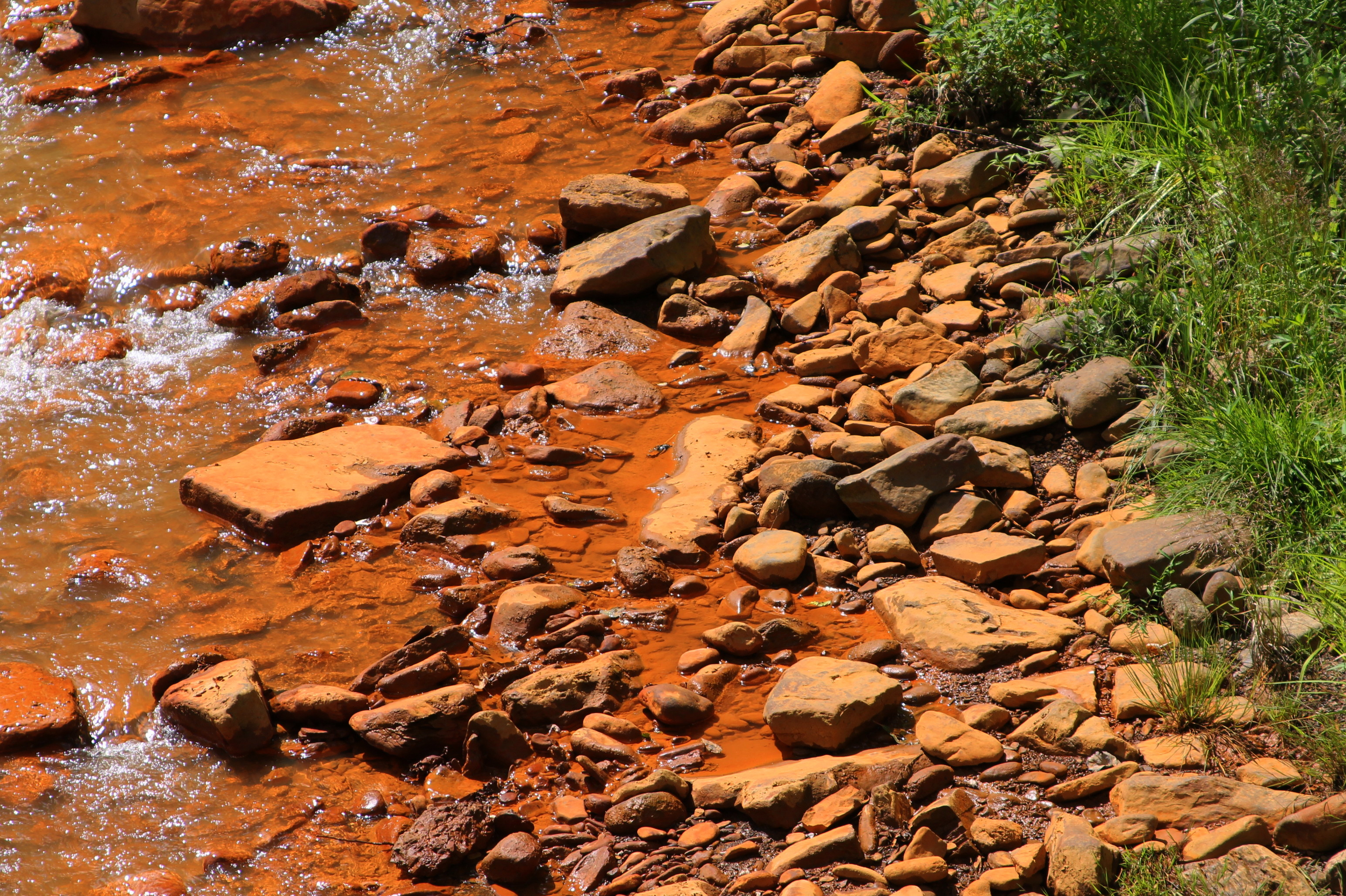
Rocks stained with iron precipitate on Shamokin Creek

The topography of the watershed of Shamokin Creek is "broken and mountainous". The lower reaches of the watershed mainly consist of rolling hills. The creek cuts through Big Mountain and Little Mountain immediately north of Shamokin. Locust Mountain and Mahanoy Mountain are on the southern border of the watershed's upper reaches. Broad alluvial flats occur in the lower reaches of the watershed. Mine spoil and pits occur in the upper reaches. Although mining only occurred in the upper third of the creek's watershed, south of Big Mountain, iron precipitate lines the creek for much of its length.

The channel of Shamokin Creek is sinuous and flows through rock formations consisting of sandstone, shale, and extensive anthracite deposits. There are some culm deposits along the creek. The creek flows between stone walls in Shamokin. The upper 51.5 square miles (133 km^{2}) of the watershed, upstream of Big Mountain, are in the Western Middle Anthracite Field, in the Coal Region. There are 34 coal veins in the watershed and nearly all have been either deep-mined or strip-mined. The creek passes through rock of the Hamilton Formation near Paxinos. The creek's valley is partly carved from Marcellus black slate. Red shale of the Mauch Chunk Formation also occurs in the watershed.

Shamokin Creek flows almost entirely through rapids in from Shamokin downstream for 2 miles (3.2 km). Most of these rapids are easily navigable by canoe, but there is one difficult and bouldery rapid near the Glen Burn Colliery. Eventually, the whitewater on the creek becomes less prevalent. By Paxinos, the rapids have almost disappeared, save for some sluices formed by cobbles. There is a weir with a height of 2 feet (0.61 m) on the creek 2 miles (3.2 km) downstream of Shamokin.

In the early 1900s, the average rate of precipitation in the watershed of Shamokin Creek was 35 to 50 inches (89 to 127 cm) per year. The water temperature of the creek at Shamokin was measured to be 18.0 °C (64.4 °F) in August 1999.

== Watershed ==
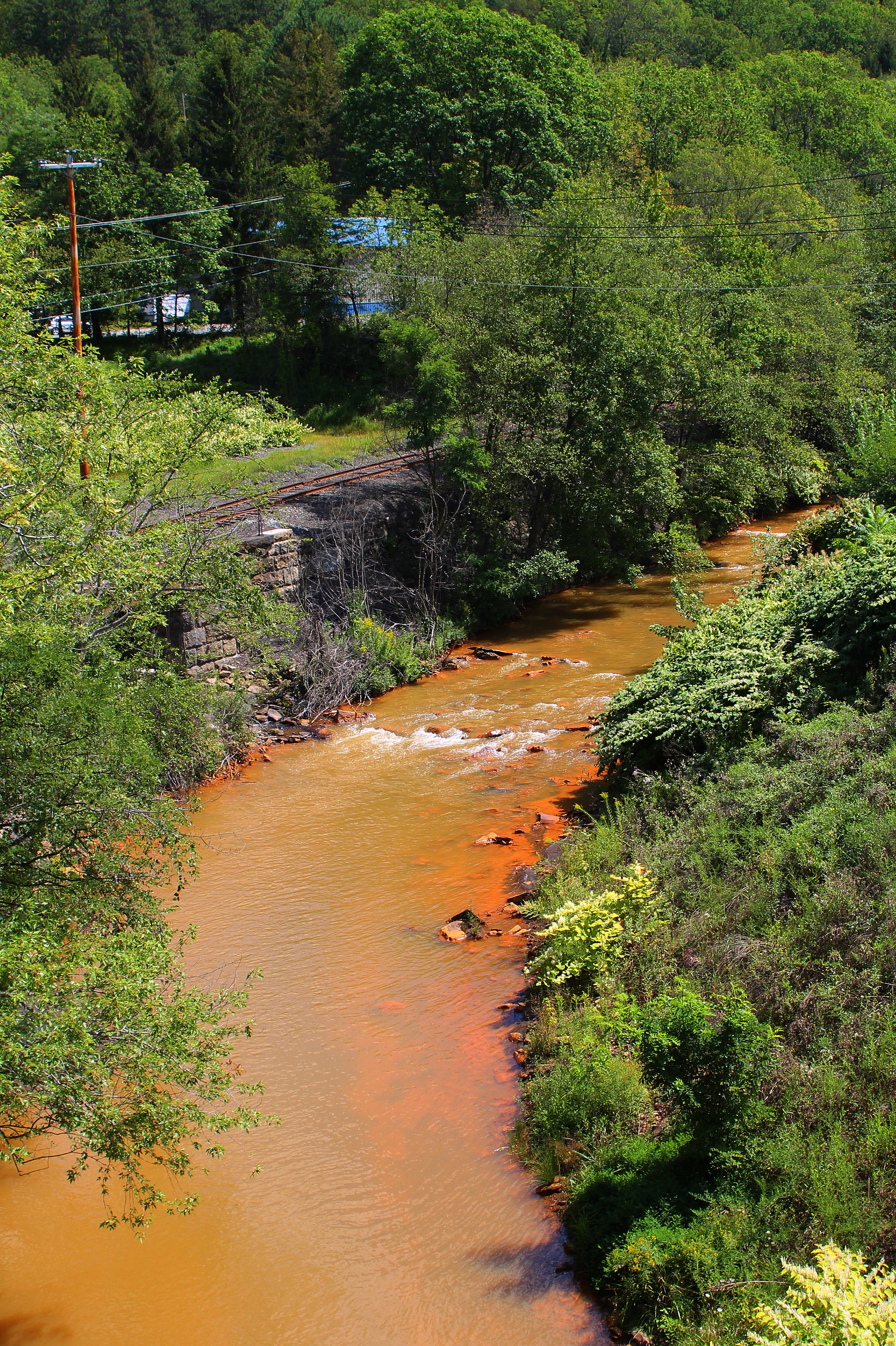
Shamokin Creek at Tharptown

The watershed of Shamokin Creek has an area of 137 square miles (350 km^{2}). The mouth of the creek is in the United States Geological Survey quadrangle of Sunbury. However, its source is in the quadrangle of Mount Carmel. The creek also passes through the quadrangles of Danville, Shamokin, Riverside, and Trevorton. The creek's watershed mainly occupies southern Columbia County and central Northumberland County. There are 14 municipalities in the watershed of Shamokin Creek, including 13 in Northumberland County and one in Columbia County.

There are 413 miles (665 km) of streams in the watershed of Shamokin Creek. Of these, 113 miles (182 km) (27 percent) are impaired by abandoned mine drainage. In Mount Carmel, the creek is used to carry stormwater. Historically, it carried waste such as untreated sewage from both the community of Mount Carmel and the area's mining industry. Sewage was also discharged into the creek at Sunbury via several pipes.

Forested land and agricultural land dominate the Shamokin Creek watershed as a whole, making up 61 and 32 percent of its land area. Only 7 percent is barren or urban land. However, the land use is considerably different in the upper 54 square miles (140 km^{2}) of the watershed. This part of the watershed is 57 percent forested, 38 percent mine spoils (including some that have been hidden by forest growth), 5 percent urban land, and less than 1 percent agricultural land. In the early 1900s, there were marshes on the creek below Shamokin.

Most of the land along the upper reaches of Shamokin Creek is commercial and industrial, with trash lining the streambanks. Further downstream, the creek flows through a broad floodplain, but remains impacted by development and has culm lining its cobble bars. Downstream of Snydertown, the landscape through which the creek flows is no longer impacted by development or mining and consists of forests and agricultural land.

Pennsylvania Route 61 follows the main stem of Shamokin Creek for much of the creek's length.

== History and etymology ==
Shamokin Creek was entered into the Geographic Names Information System on August 2, 1979. Its identifier in the Geographic Names Information System is 1193324. The creek is also known as Great Shamokin Creek and Middle Branch Shamokin Creek. The former name appears in Thomas Francis Gordon's A Gazetteer of the State of Pennsylvania, which was published in 1833. The latter name appears in a 1982 county highway map made by the Pennsylvania Department of Transportation. The creek is named after a Delaware word for "Eel Creek".

Many of the early settlers in the valley of Shamokin Creek were Scotch-Irish. The first mill in the current boundaries of Northumberland County was built on or near the creek in 1774. A road up the creek's valley was being laid out by 1775. The first coal in Shamokin was discovered in Shamokin Creek at what is now Spurzheim Street and Clay Street. Before the War of 1812, Abraham Cherry constructed a sawmill on Shamokin Creek. Some coal mining was being done at the creek by 1825. A dam was constructed on the creek in Shamokin in 1826 and John C. Byrd opened a stone coal quarry on the creek in the same year. The only canal boat on Shamokin Creek was launched in the early 1830s.

In the early 1900s, the most significant industries in the watershed of Shamokin Creek were coal mining, foundries, iron works, nail production, agriculture, silk mills, and woolen mills. The creek was also used as water power for several small mills and was used as a water supply for the Pennsylvania Railroad. The Roaring Creek Water Company also used some of its tributaries as water supplies.

Major settlements in the watershed of Shamokin Creek in the early 1900s included Shamokin, Mount Carmel, and Sunbury. Their populations were 19,588, 17,532, and 13,770, respectively. The main railroads in the watershed at this time were the Pennsylvania Railroad, the Philadelphia and Reading Railroad (both of which followed the creek for much of its length), and the Lehigh Valley Railroad (which crossed the upper part of the watershed).

Shamokin Creek was impacted by waste from coal mines as early as the early 1900s. Anthracite mining was historically a prevalent industry in the watershed. Although production peaked in 1917, with 4400 men mining 6.2 million tons of coal annually, coal mining still continues in the watershed. Most mines in the watershed closed by 1960 and mining in the watershed is not expected to increase in the future. However, as of 2001, there are more than 20 mining permits in the watershed.

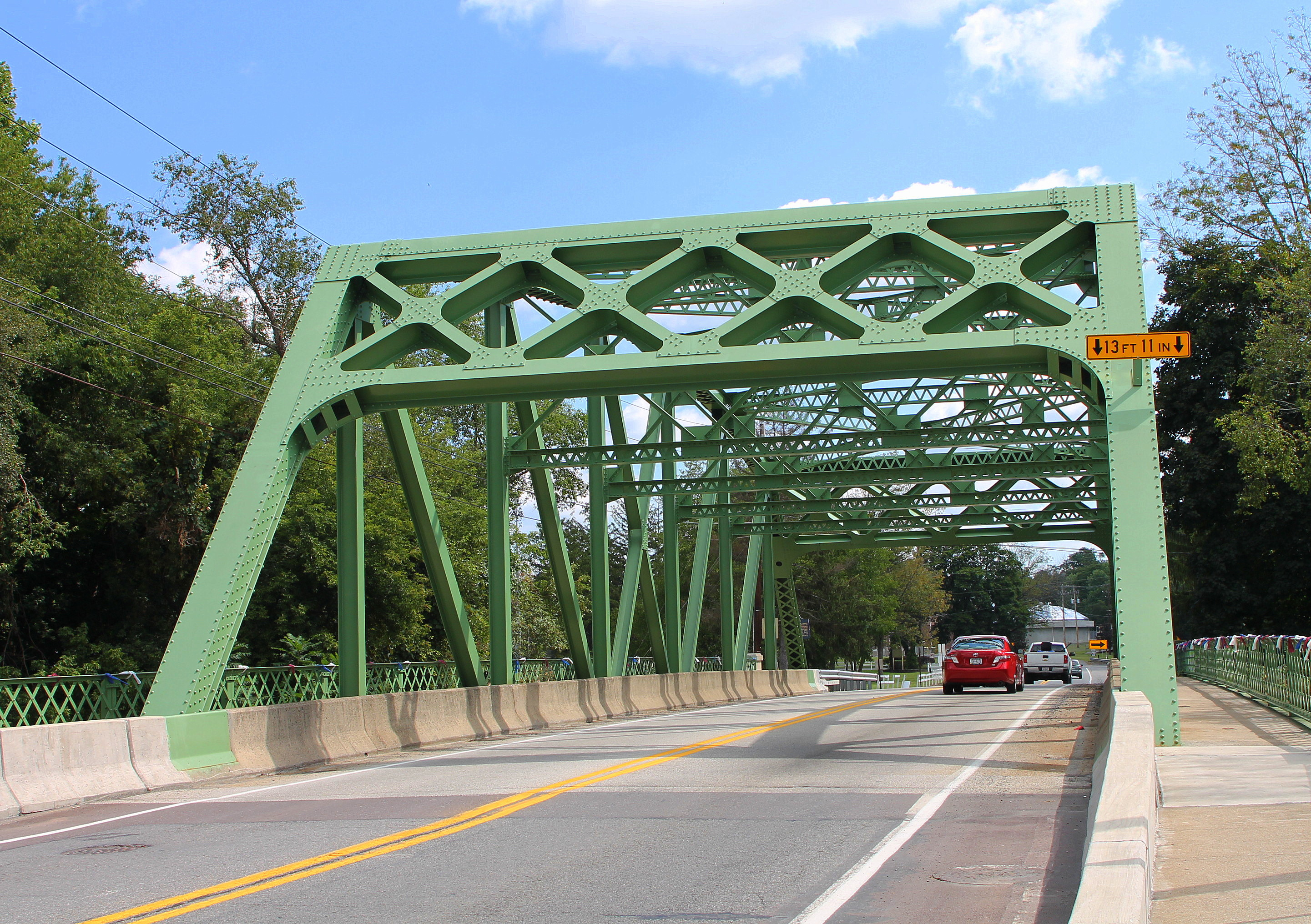
Shamokin Creek Bridge

A bridge known as the Shamokin Creek Bridge carries Pennsylvania Route 61 over Shamokin Creek in Sunbury. It is a through truss bridge that was built in 1933 and repaired in 1981. The bridge is open to traffic and has a length of 158.1 feet (48.2 m). It has little historical significance.

Shamokin Creek was the subject of an Operation Scarlift report in 1972. The Shamokin Creek Restoration Alliance was founded in 1996 with the purpose of "[encouraging] partnerships and develop[ing] incentives and methods to facilitate funding for reclamation of abandoned mine lands (AML) in Shamokin Creek watershed."

In 1999, the Northumberland County Conservation District received a $52,830 to assess Shamokin Creek. In the same year, the Shamokin Creek Restoration Alliance received a $5000 grant from the Eastern Pennsylvania Coalition for Abandoned Mine Restoration. Various grants for passive treatment systems in the watershed were also given in 1999. In 2002, the Northumberland County Planning Commission received a $75,000 Growing Greener grant to eliminate sources of impairment in the watershed of Shamokin Creek. In 2003, the Northumberland County Conservation District and the Shamokin Creek Restoration Alliance received more than $500,000 in grants from the United States Environmental Protection Agency to repair abandoned mine drainage sources in the watershed.

A flood control project was carried out on Shamokin Creek in Mount Carmel in 2013.

== Biology ==
The main stem of Shamokin Creek is designated as a Warmwater Fishery and a Migratory Fishery. However, all of the creek's tributaries—including unnamed ones— are designated as Coldwater Fisheries and Migratory Fisheries.

The main stem of Shamokin Creek is not inhabited by any aquatic life upstream of the tributary Carbon Run. However, the creek supports six species of fish further downstream.

In 2001, there were 169 individual fish from eight species in Shamokin Creek at Shamokin. The most common species were white suckers (74 individuals), creek chubs (48 individuals), and spotfin shiners (31 individuals). Other species included pumpkinseeds, (7 individuals), green sunfish (5 individuals), yellow bullhead (2 individuals), stonerollers, and rainbow trout (1 individual each).

In Shamokin Creek at Sunbury, there were 112 individual fish from 14 different species. The most common species were smallmouth bass (46 individuals), fallfish (24 individuals), and white suckers (14 individuals). Less common species included pumpkinseeds (six individuals), chain pickerel (five individuals), and spotfin shiners (five individuals). Rarer species included Margined madtom (three individuals) and rock bass and brown bullhead (two individuals each). Only one creek chub, green sunfish, bluegill, tessellated darter, and walleye were observed.

Historically, Shamokin Creek had large populations of pike, sunfish, suckers, and eels.

Many areas in the upper reaches of Shamokin Creek support little or no macroinvertebrate life due to metals coating the streambed. In August 1999, more than 500 coliform colonies per 100 milliliters were observed in the creek near Shamokin, of which 97 were E. coli.

== Recreation ==
A total of 21.6 miles (34.8 km) of Shamokin Creek are navigable by canoe during snowmelt or within two days of hard rain. The scenery is described as "Poor to Fair" in Edward Gertler's book Keystone Canoeing. Gertler's book stated that "If there is ever a 'March of Dimes' campaign for crippled and deformed creeks, then Shamokin [Creek] will be chosen as the poster stream." The difficulty rating of the creek ranges from 1 to 3.

Pennsylvania State Game Lands Number 165 is on Little Mountain and is partially in the Shamokin Creek watershed. The other part of the game lands is in the drainage basin of Mahanoy Creek.

== Gallery ==
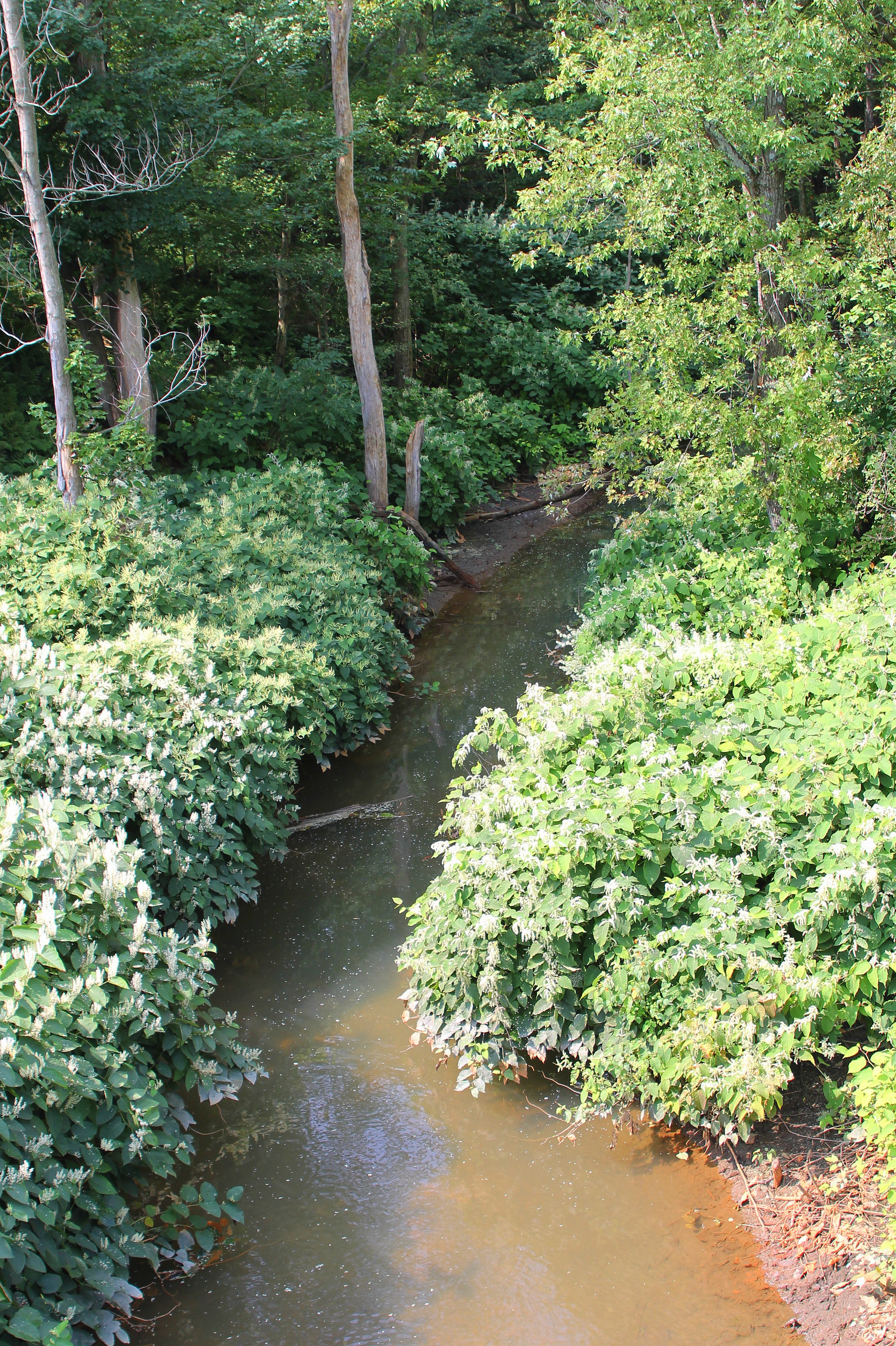
Shamokin Creek from State Route 2034

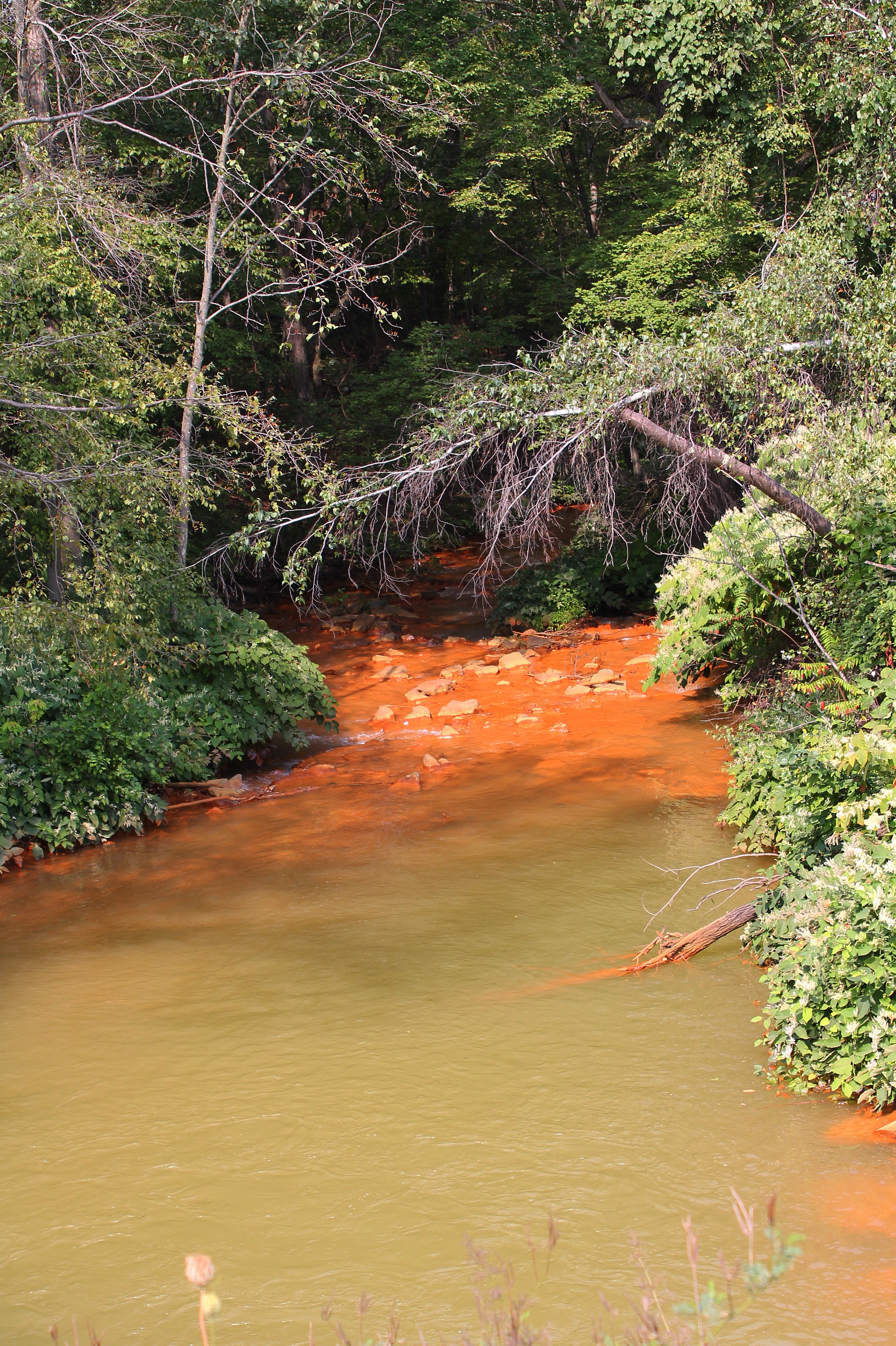
Above Quaker Run

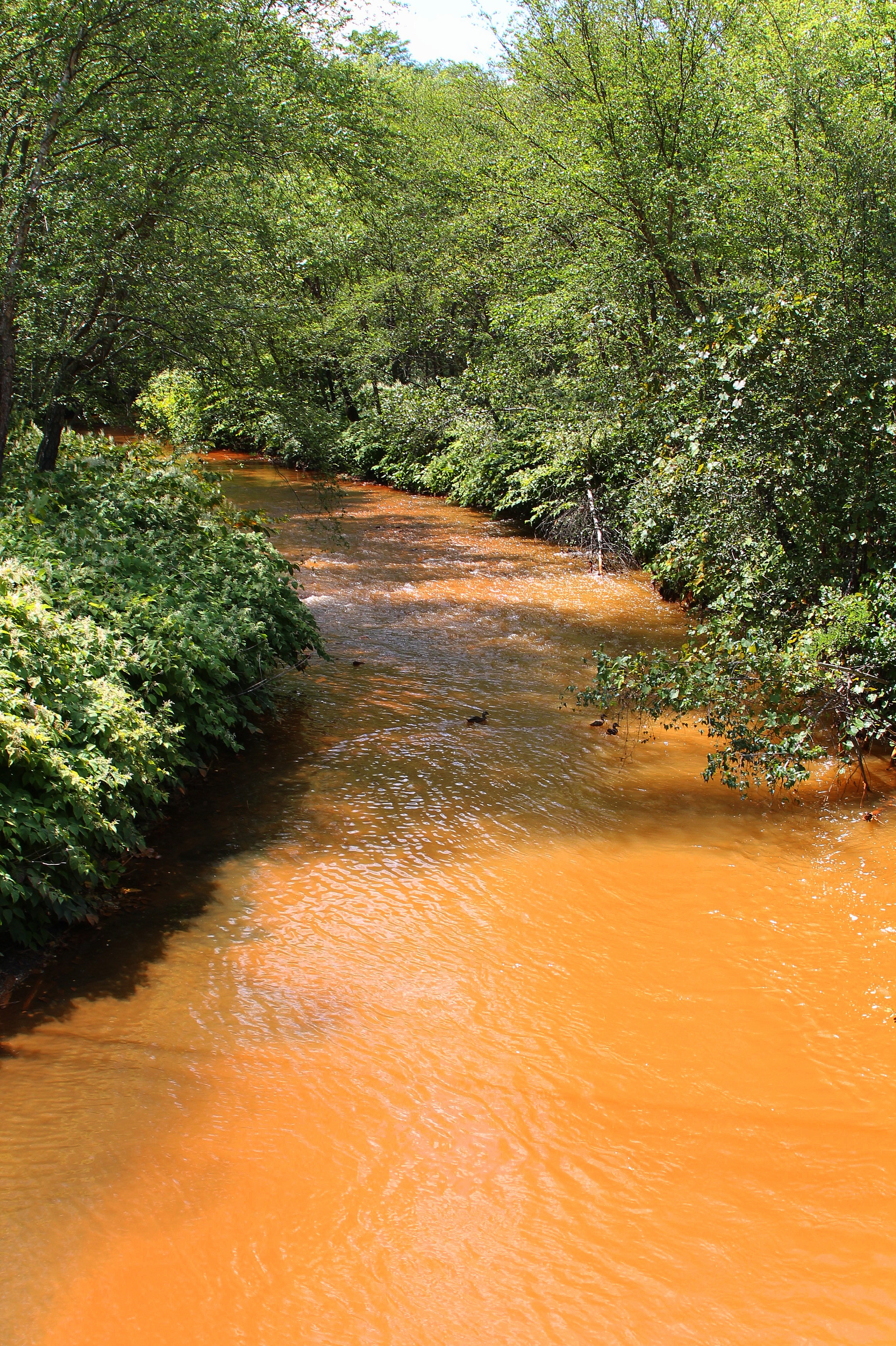
At Millers Run

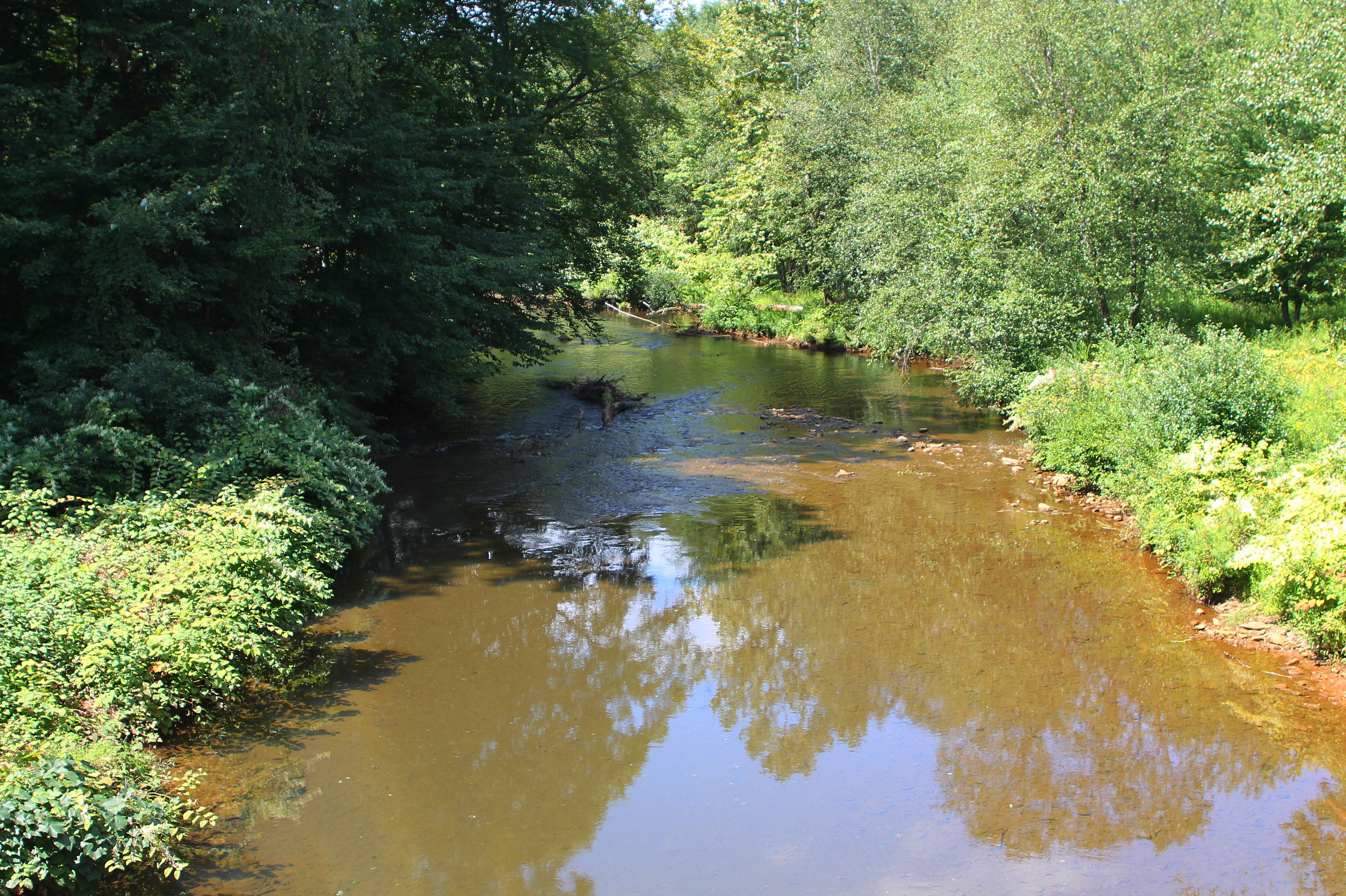
At Snydertown

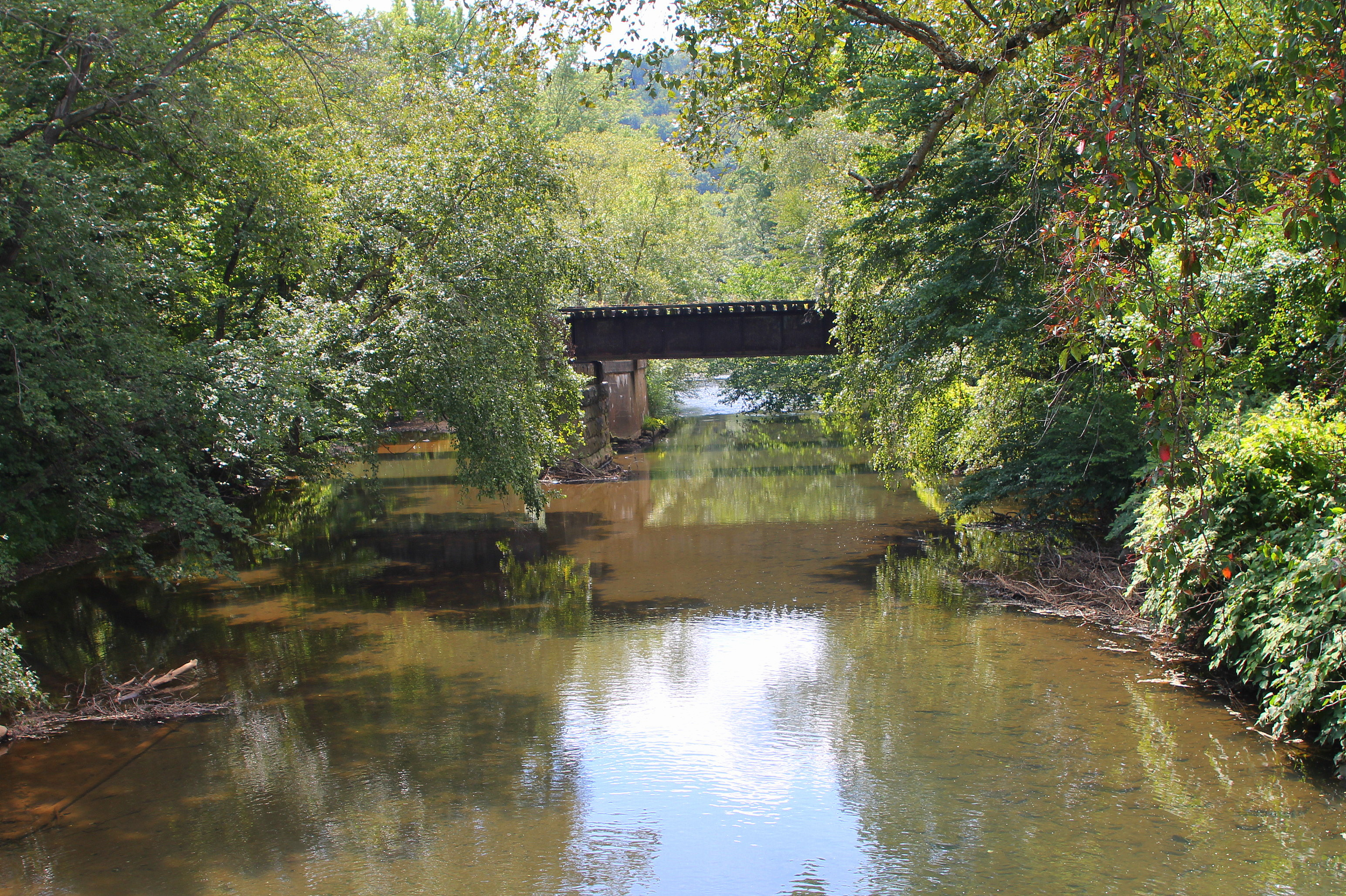
At Sunbury

== See also ==
- Keefer Station Covered Bridge: crossing
- West Branch Susquehanna River, next tributary of the Susquehanna River going upriver
- Rolling Green Run, next tributary of the Susquehanna River going downriver
- List of rivers of Pennsylvania
