= Shikellamy (disambiguation) =

Shikellamy was an Oneida leader and overseer of the Shawnee for the Iroquois in Pennsylvania during the mid-18th century.

Shikellamy may also refer to:

- Shikellamy State Park, in Pennsylvania
- Shikellamy School District, in Pennsylvania
  - Shikellamy High School, serving Northumberland and Sunbury, Pennsylvania
