= Shikellamy School District =

School district in Pennsylvania

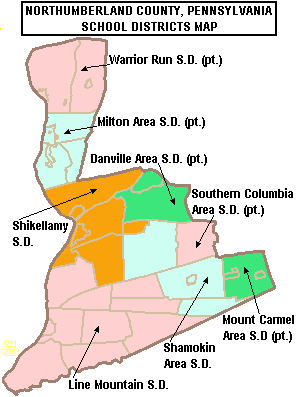
- Shikellamy School District region shown in orange

Address
- 200 Island Blvd Sunbury, Northumberland County, Pennsylvania, 17801-1028; United States

District information
- Type: Public

Students and staff
- District mascot: Braves
- Colors: Blue and red

Other information
- Website: https://www.shikbraves.org/

Shikellamy School District is a midsized, suburban/rural, public school district in Northumberland County, Pennsylvania. It serves Northumberland Borough, Point Township, Rockefeller Township, Snydertown Borough, the City of Sunbury, and Upper Augusta Township. The administrative offices are located at Administration Center, 200 Island Blvd, Sunbury, Pennsylvania. Shikellamy School District encompasses approximately 71 square miles (180 km^{2}). According to 2000 federal census data, Per the US Census Bureau, by 2010, the district's population declined to 22,554 people. The educational attainment levels for the Shikellamy School District population 25 and over were 83.6% high school graduates and 15.3% college graduates.

According to the Pennsylvania Budget and Policy Center, 45% of the Shikellamy School District's pupils lived at 185% or below the Federal Poverty Level as shown by their eligibility for the federal free or reduced price school meal programs in 2012. In 2013 the Pennsylvania Department of Education, reported that 37 students in the Shikellamy School District were homeless.

In 2009, the district residents’ per capita income was $16,811, while the median family income was $40,063. In the Commonwealth, the median family income was $49,501 and the United States median family income was $49,445, in 2010. In Northumberland County, the median household income was $41,208. By 2013, the median household income in the United States rose to $52,100. In 2014, the median household income in the U.S. was $53,700.

High school students may choose to attend the SUN Area Technical Institute for training in the construction and mechanical trades. The Central Susquehanna Intermediate Unit CSIU16 provides the district with a wide variety of services like: specialized education for disabled students; state mandated training on recognizing and reporting child abuse; speech and visual disability services; criminal background check processing for prospective employees and professional development for staff and faculty.

== Schools ==
- Shikellamy High School grades 9th-12th
- Shikellamy Middle School (grades 6–8)
- Grace Beck Elementary School
- Chief Shikellamy Elementary School
- Oaklyn Elementary School
- Priestley Elementary School

Opened on September 6, 2016, the Shikellamy Middle School replaced the closed Sunbury Middle School and CW Rice Middle school, built on the site of the latter.

== Extracurriculars ==
Shikellamy School District offers a wide variety of clubs, activities and an extensive sports program. The sports programs are through the Pennsylvania Heartland Athletic Conference. The Pennsylvania Heartland Athletic Conference is a voluntary association of 25 PIAA High Schools within the central Pennsylvania region.

=== Sports ===
The district funds:

Boys

- Baseball - AAA
- Basketball- AAA
- Bowling - AAAA
- Cross Country - AA
- Football - AAA
- Golf - AAA
- Soccer - AA
- Tennis - AA
- Track and Field - AAA
- Wrestling - AAA

Girls

- Basketball - AAA
- Bowling - AAAA
- Cross Country - AA
- Field Hockey - AA
- Golf - AAA
- Soccer (Fall) - AA
- Softball - AAA
- Swimming and Diving - AA *added 2015
- Girls' Tennis - AA
- Track and Field - AAA

Junior High School Sports

Boys

- Basketball
- Cross Country
- Football
- Soccer
- Wrestling

Girls

- Basketball
- Cross Country
- Field Hockey
- Soccer (Fall)
- Softball

According to PIAA directory July 2015
