= Shikellamy High School =

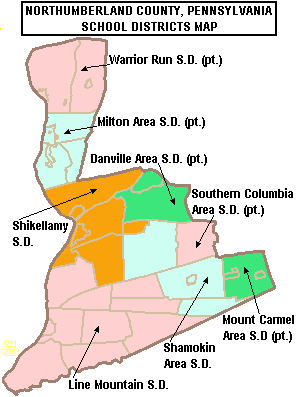

Location
- 600 Walnut Street; Sunbury, Pennsylvania 17801-3297; United States; 40.8565°N 76.7893°W

Information
- Type: Public
- Opened: 1965 (59 years ago)
- School district: Shikellamy School District
- Superintendent: Jeremy Winn
- CEEB code: 394740
- Principal: Marc Freeman
- Faculty: 106 (2023)
- Teaching staff: 38.83 (FTE)
- Grades: High School (9-12)
- Enrollment: 896 (2023-2024)
- Student to teacher ratio: 23.07
- Language: English
- Colors: Maroon, white, and blue
- Team name: Shikellamy Braves
- Website: http://www.shikbraves.org/

Shikellamy High School is a public high school located in Sunbury, Pennsylvania, United States. The school was named after Oneida Chief Shikellamy. The building was built in 1929. In 1965, a merger between Northumberland High School and Sunbury High School created Shikellamy High School. It is part of the Shikellamy School District. It is the sole public high school for the communities of Northumberland, Point Township, Rockefeller Township, Snydertown Borough, the City of Sunbury, and Upper Augusta Township. It was a combined middle/high school between 2011 and 2016 due to the deconstruction of C.W. Rice Middle School, but Shikellamy Middle School now exists for grades 6-8 in Northumberland.

== Rankings ==
In 2023, Shikellamy High School was named #11,315 best high school in the United States, #434 in the state, and #5 in Sunbury, Pennsylvania Metro Area by U.S. News & World Report.

== Extracurriculars ==
Shikellamy High School offers many extracurricular activities to its students. It has many clubs, including: foreign language clubs, Future Scientists/Business Leaders of America, science clubs, and community service clubs. The school is well known for its band and theatre, forensics programs, and the JROTC.

=== Athletics ===
The school contains:

Boys

- Baseball - AAAAA
- Basketball- AAAAA
- Bowling - AAAA
- Cross country - AAA
- Football - AAAA
- Golf - AAA
- Soccer - AAA
- Tennis - AAA
- Track and field - AAA
- Wrestling - AAA

Girls

- Basketball - AAAAA
- Bowling - AAAA
- Cross country - AAA
- Field hockey - AA
- Golf - AAA
- Soccer - AA
- Softball - AAAAA
- Tennis - AAA
- Track and field - AAA
- Wrestling - AAAA

According to PIAA directory February 2024
