= Keefer Station Covered Bridge =

- U.S. National Register of Historic Places
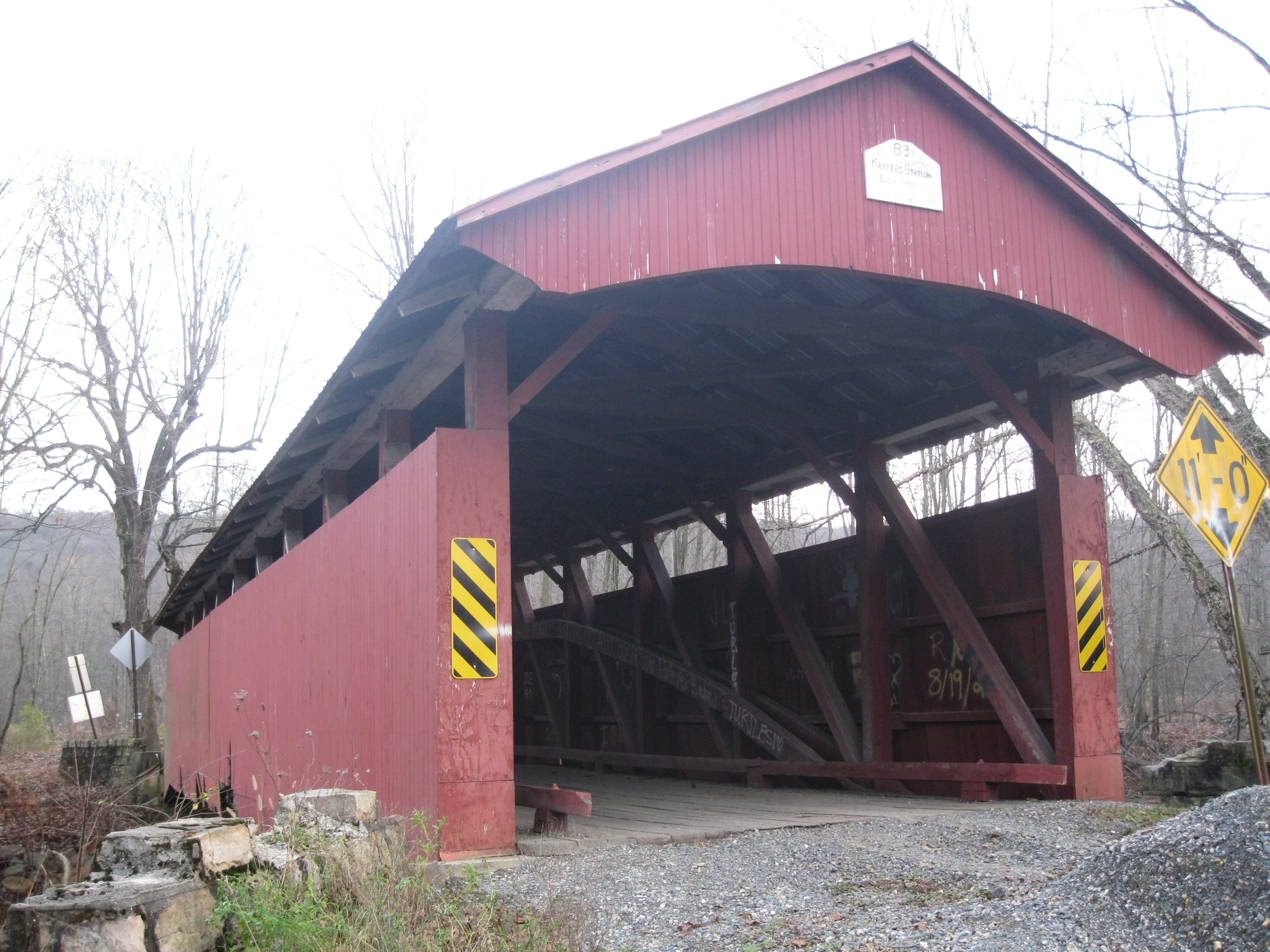
- The bridge in November 2012

- Location within Pennsylvania Location within the United States
- Location: East of Sunbury on Township 698, Upper Augusta Township, Pennsylvania
- Coordinates: 40°52′14″N 76°43′25″W
- Area: 0.1 acres (0.040 ha)
- Built: 1888
- Built by: George W. Keffer
- Architectural style: Burr arch
- MPS: Covered Bridges of Northumberland County TR
- NRHP reference No.: 79002313
- Added to NRHP: August 8, 1979

Keefer Station Covered Bridge is a historic wooden covered bridge located at Upper Augusta Township in Northumberland County, Pennsylvania. It is a 109-foot-long (33 m), Burr Truss bridge, constructed in 1888. It crosses the Shamokin Creek.

It was listed on the National Register of Historic Places in 1979.
