= Upper Augusta Township, Pennsylvania =

Township in Pennsylvania, US

Coordinates: 40°53′00″N 76°43′59″W

- Township
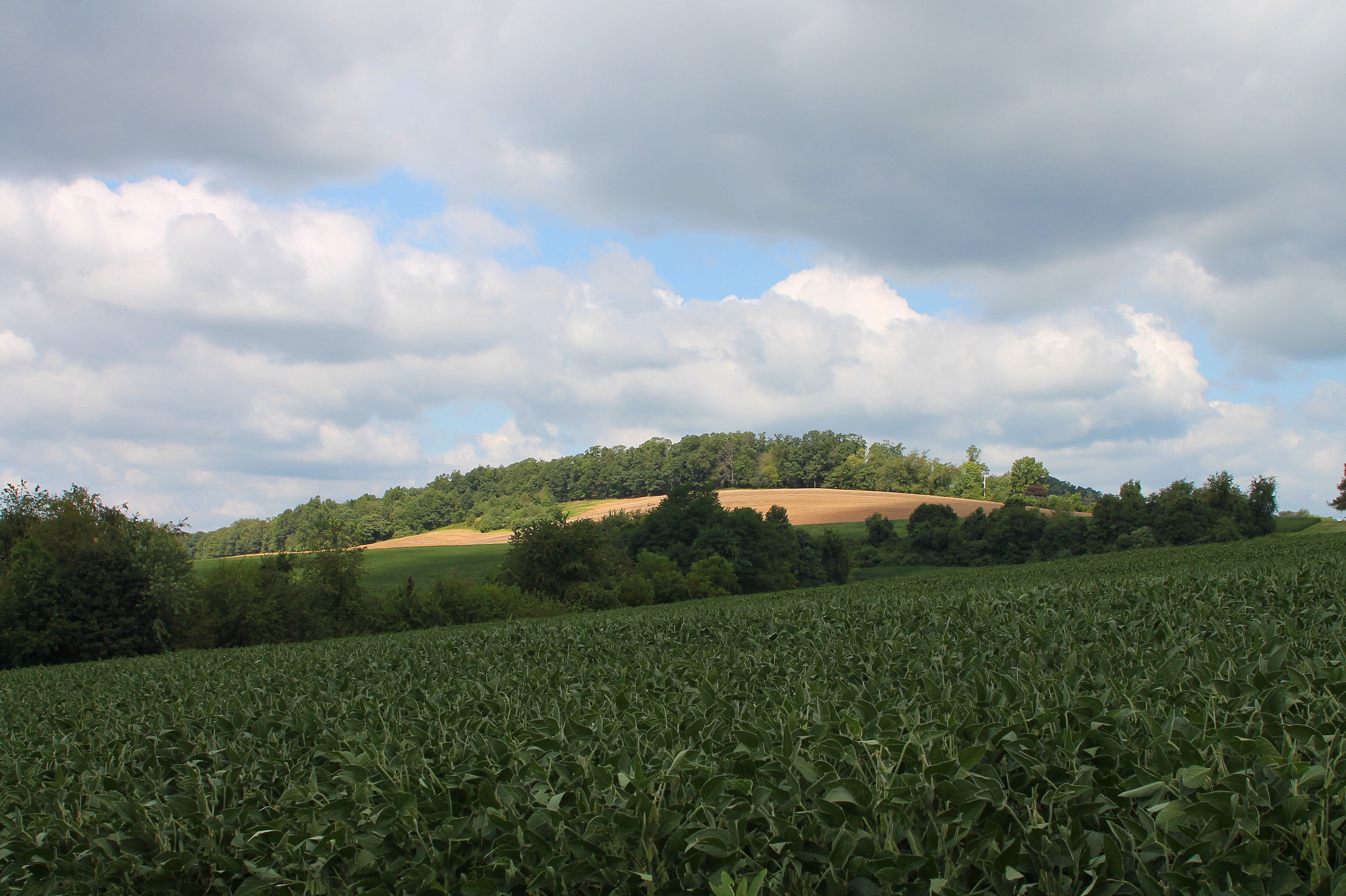
- Scenery in Upper Augusta Township

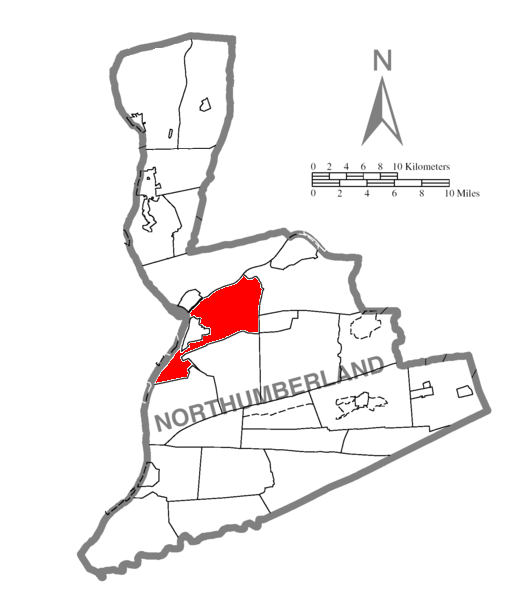
- Map of Northumberland County, Pennsylvania highlighting Upper Augusta Township

- Map of Northumberland County, Pennsylvania
- Country: United States
- State: Pennsylvania
- County: Northumberland
- Settled: 1701
- Incorporated: 1846

Government
  - Type: Board of Supervisors

Area
  - Total: 22.69 sq mi (58.76 km^{2})
  - Land: 19.55 sq mi (50.63 km^{2})
  - Water: 3.14 sq mi (8.13 km^{2})

Population (2010)
  - Total: 2,586
  - Estimate (2016): 2,549
  - Density: 130.4/sq mi (50.34/km^{2})
- Time zone: UTC-5 (Eastern (EST))
  - Summer (DST): UTC-4 (EDT)
- Area code: 570
- FIPS code: 42-097-78744
- Website: https://www.upperaugustatwp.org/

Upper Augusta Township is a township in Northumberland County, Pennsylvania, United States. It was formed in 1846 by the division of Augusta Township (one of the seven original townships of Northumberland County formed in 1772) into Upper and Lower sections. The population at the 2010 Census was 2,586, an increase over the figure of 2,556 tabulated in 2000.

== History ==
The Keefer Station Covered Bridge and Sunbury Armory are listed on the National Register of Historic Places.

Voters rejected a tax referendum in May 2007 which would have increased local earned income tax by 0.5 percent to reduce property taxes for homeowners and farmers by $176.

== Geography ==
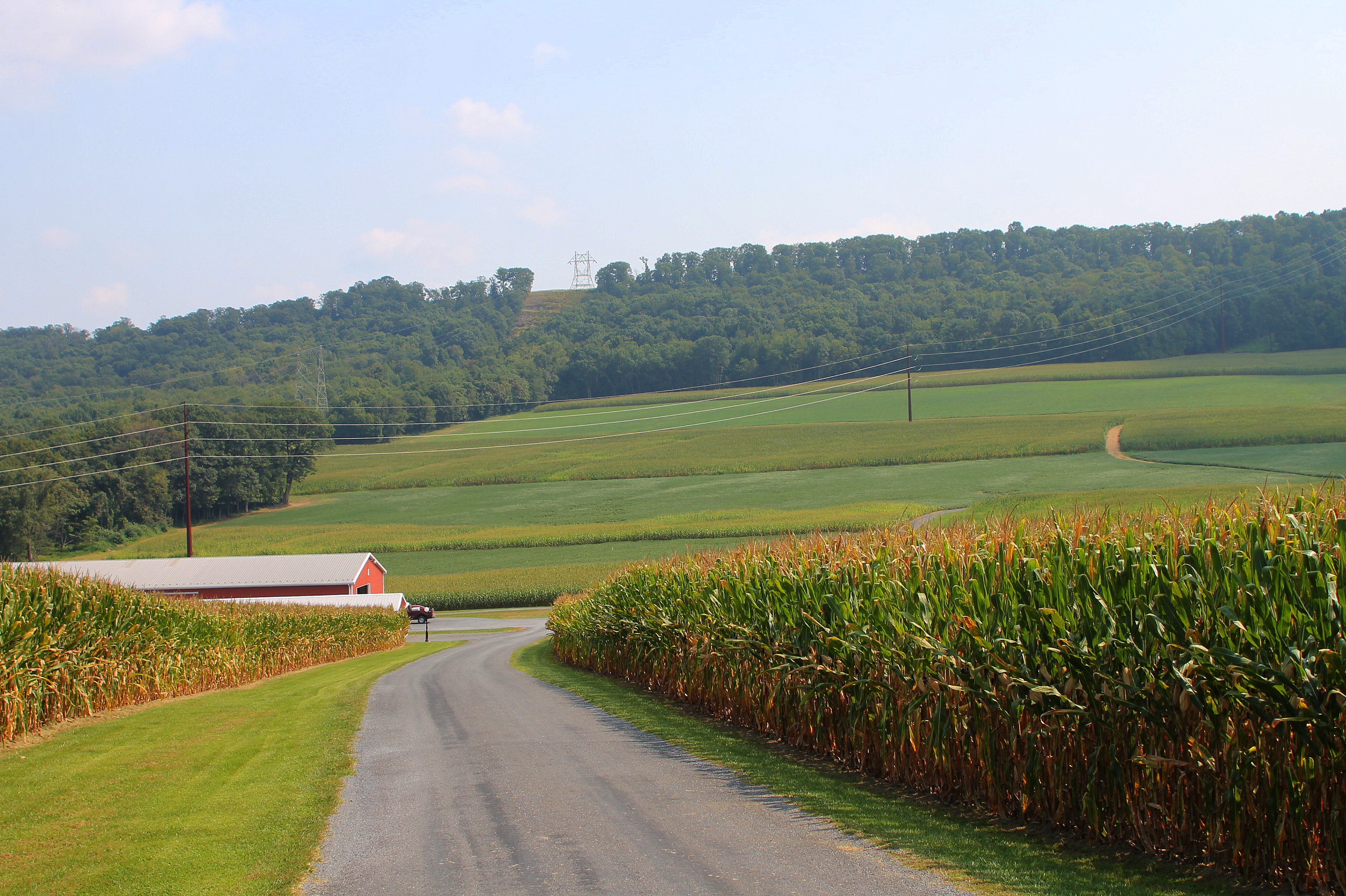
Upper Augusta Township south of Sunbury

According to the United States Census Bureau, the township has a total area of 23.3 square miles (60.3 km^{2}), of which 20.3 square miles (52.5 km^{2}) is land and 3.0 square miles (7.8 km^{2}) (12.97%) is water.

== Demographics ==
Historical population
Census	Pop.	Note	%±
2010	2,586		—
2016 (est.)	2,549		−1.4%
U.S. Decennial Census

As of the census of 2000, there were 2,556 people, 1,022 households, and 781 families residing in the township. The population density was 126.2 inhabitants per square mile (48.7/km^{2}). There were 1,058 housing units at an average density of 52.2 per square mile (20.2/km^{2}). The racial makeup of the township was 98.16% White, 0.51% African American, 0.08% Asian, 0.12% Pacific Islander, 0.47% from other races, and 0.67% from two or more races. Hispanic or Latino of any race were 0.74% of the population.

There were 1,022 households, out of which 26.1% had children under the age of 18 living with them, 66.6% were married couples living together, 5.9% had a female householder with no husband present, and 23.5% were non-families. 20.5% of all households were made up of individuals, and 10.7% had someone living alone who was 65 years of age or older. The average household size was 2.44 and the average family size was 2.80.

In the township the population was spread out, with 20.0% under the age of 18, 5.8% from 18 to 24, 26.9% from 25 to 44, 29.4% from 45 to 64, and 18.0% who were 65 years of age or older. The median age was 44 years. For every 100 females, there were 98.3 males. For every 100 females age 18 and over, there were 96.8 males.

The median income for a household in the township was $41,875, and the median income for a family was $48,875. Males had a median income of $35,489 versus $21,389 for females. The per capita income for the township was $22,433. About 2.9% of families and 5.1% of the population were below the poverty line, including 9.6% of those under age 18 and 4.7% of those age 65 or over.

== Education ==
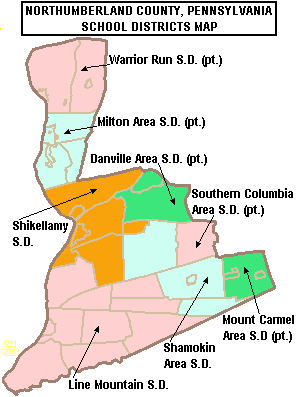
Map of Northumberland County, Pennsylvania Public School Districts

The local public school system is the Shikellamy School District. The administrative offices are located at Administration Center, 200 Island Blvd, Sunbury, Pennsylvania. Shikellamy High School has a 78% graduation rate according to the district report card 2005–2006. In 11th grade, 49% were proficient in math. For reading 62% were proficient in 2005–2006. The high school is ranked rank 384th out of 606 public high schools in Pennsylvania.

In 2007, the Pittsburgh Business Times ranked the Shikellamy School District 434th out of 499 Pennsylvania school districts based on three years of Pennsylvania System of Student Assessment test scores.

The Shikellamy School Board set the budget at $34.62 million for 2007–2008. The board levies a variety of taxes to support its programs. Taxes include 62.5 mills real estate tax in 2007. Per capita taxes are $5 per resident. An earned income taxes of one-half of 1 percent of income yields a revenue of approximately $1.8 million. Additionally, the real estate transfer tax of one-half percent (Northumberland Borough, Point Township, Rockefeller Township) and one percent (Snydertown borough) is levied on real estate transfers.

SUN Area Career & Technology Center is a regional vocational school, offering adult education classes, vocational education, and technical career training. SUN Tech serves over 1500 people annually. ISO9001 and Middle States Accredited. SUN Tech was presented with the Significant Achievement Award in Education for raising their Malcolm Baldrige National Quality Program criteria score to 648 points, a 345-point increase from 303 points in August 2000.

Residents also have a wide selection of alternative schools. By law, the local public school must provide transportation to schools within 10 miles (16 km) of the borders of the school district at no charge to the student.

=== Parochial schools ===
- St. Monica's School provides a parochial education program for kindergarten to 8th grades. The school is a member of the National Christian Schools Association. Noncatholics seek admission to this school.
- Sunbury Christian Academy offers pre-kindergarten through 12th grade. The campus is located just north of the borough of Northumberland. The student population is nearing 160. Programs and student accomplishments are noted regularly in local media.
- Northumberland Christian School was founded in 1972 and is a ministry of the First Regular Baptist Church of Northumberland, Pa. The school offers an educational program for students from preschool through high school.
