= Shamokin Township, Pennsylvania =

Township in Pennsylvania, US

Coordinates: 40°53′00″N 76°36′59″W

- Township
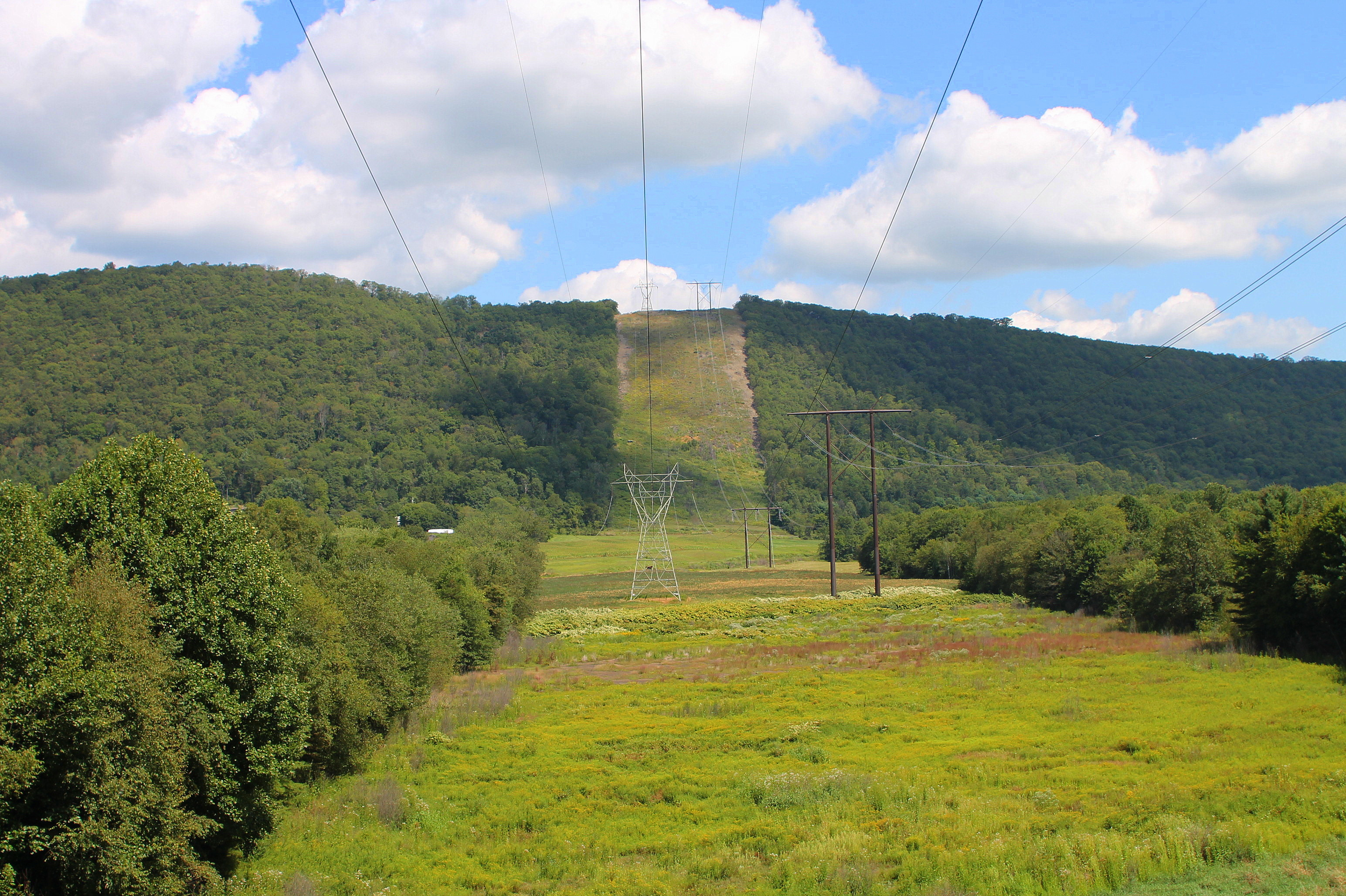
- Scenery of Shamokin Township

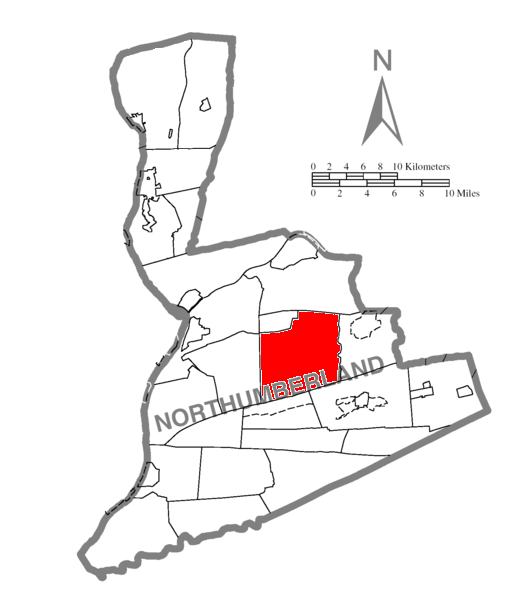
- Map of Northumberland County, Pennsylvania highlighting Shamokin Township

- Map of Northumberland County, Pennsylvania
- Country: United States
- State: Pennsylvania
- County: Northumberland
- Settled: 1774
- Incorporated: 1788

Government
  - Type: Board of Supervisors

Area
  - Total: 31.12 sq mi (80.59 km^{2})
  - Land: 30.90 sq mi (80.03 km^{2})
  - Water: 0.22 sq mi (0.56 km^{2})

Population (2010)
  - Total: 2,407
  - Estimate (2016): 2,403
  - Density: 77.8/sq mi (30.02/km^{2})
- Time zone: UTC-5 (Eastern (EST))
  - Summer (DST): UTC-4 (EDT)
- Area code: 570
- FIPS code: 42-097-69608
- Website: https://shamokintownship.org/

Shamokin Township is a township in Northumberland County, Pennsylvania, United States. The population at the 2010 Census was 2,407, an increase over the figure of 2,159 tabulated in 2000.

The city of Shamokin does not sit within the boundaries of Shamokin Township, but is inside Coal Township bordering it to the south.

== History ==
The hamlet known as Deibler began before 1830 as Deibler's Station beside the old railroad right of way, located east of Snydertown on the south side of Snydertown Road just east of Short Road. Deibler Station Church Cemetery is located on the east side of Short Road, south of Shamokin Creek and the railroad right of way.

== Geography ==
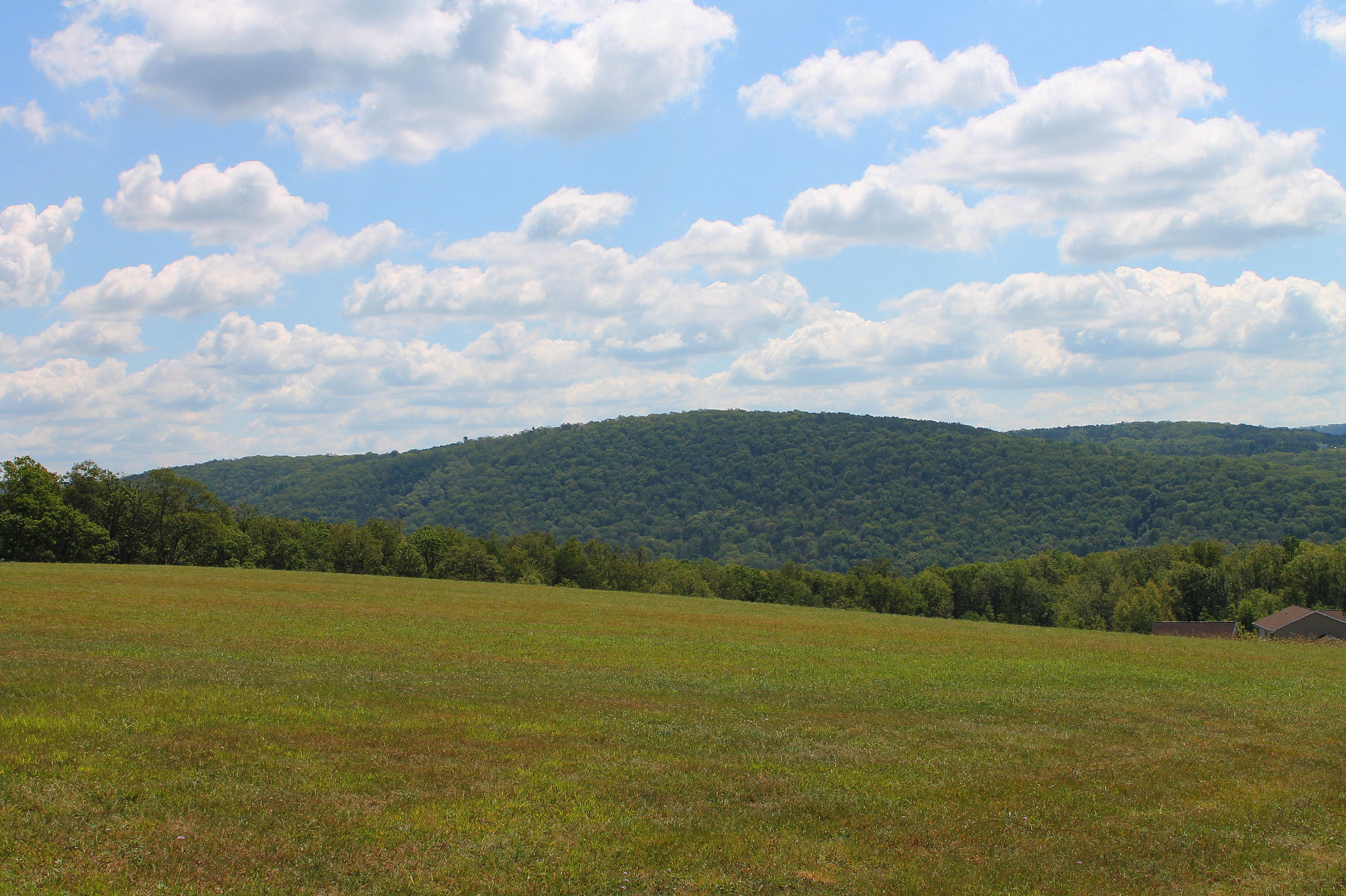
Scenery in Shamokin Township

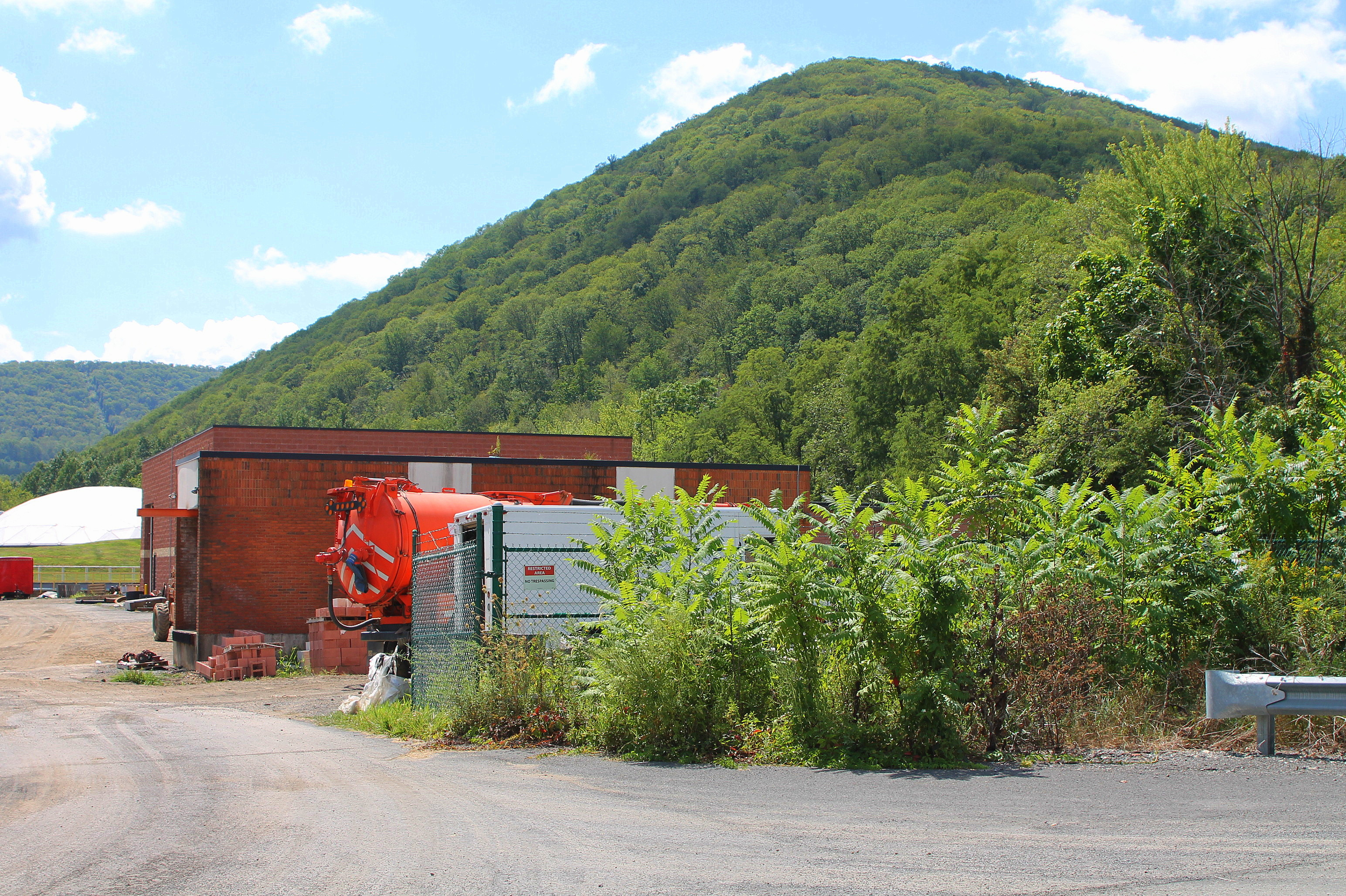
Ridge in Shamokin Township

According to the United States Census Bureau, the township has a total area of 31.1 square miles (80.7 km^{2}), of which 31.0 square miles (80.4 km^{2}) is land and 0.1 square mile (0.3 km^{2}) (0.32%) is water.

== Demographics ==
Historical population
| Census | Pop. | Note | %± |
|---|---|---|---|
| 2010 | 2,407 | | — |
| 2016 (est.) | 2,403 | | −0.2% |
U.S. Decennial Census

As of the census of 2000, there were 2,159 people, 851 households, and 646 families residing in the township. The population density was 69.6 inhabitants per square mile (26.9/km^{2}). There were 906 housing units at an average density of 29.2 per square mile (11.3/km^{2}). The racial makeup of the township was 99.35% White, 0.19% African American, 0.19% Asian, 0.19% from other races, and 0.09% from two or more races. Hispanic or Latino of any race were 0.23% of the population.

There were 851 households, out of which 30.2% had children under the age of 18 living with them, 65.7% were married couples living together, 6.1% had a female householder with no husband present, and 24.0% were non-families. 20.7% of all households were made up of individuals, and 10.7% had someone living alone who was 65 years of age or older. The average household size was 2.54 and the average family size was 2.93.

In the township the population was spread out, with 21.9% under the age of 18, 6.7% from 18 to 24, 29.5% from 25 to 44, 27.6% from 45 to 64, and 14.4% who were 65 years of age or older. The median age was 40 years. For every 100 females, there were 103.1 males. For every 100 females age 18 and over, there were 100.5 males.

The median income for a household in the township was $39,625, and the median income for a family was $45,357. Males had a median income of $32,326 versus $25,560 for females. The per capita income for the township was $18,258. About 5.2% of families and 6.3% of the population were below the poverty line, including 8.1% of those under age 18 and 10.2% of those age 65 or over.
