= Snydertown, Northumberland County, Pennsylvania =

Borough in Pennsylvania, US

- Borough
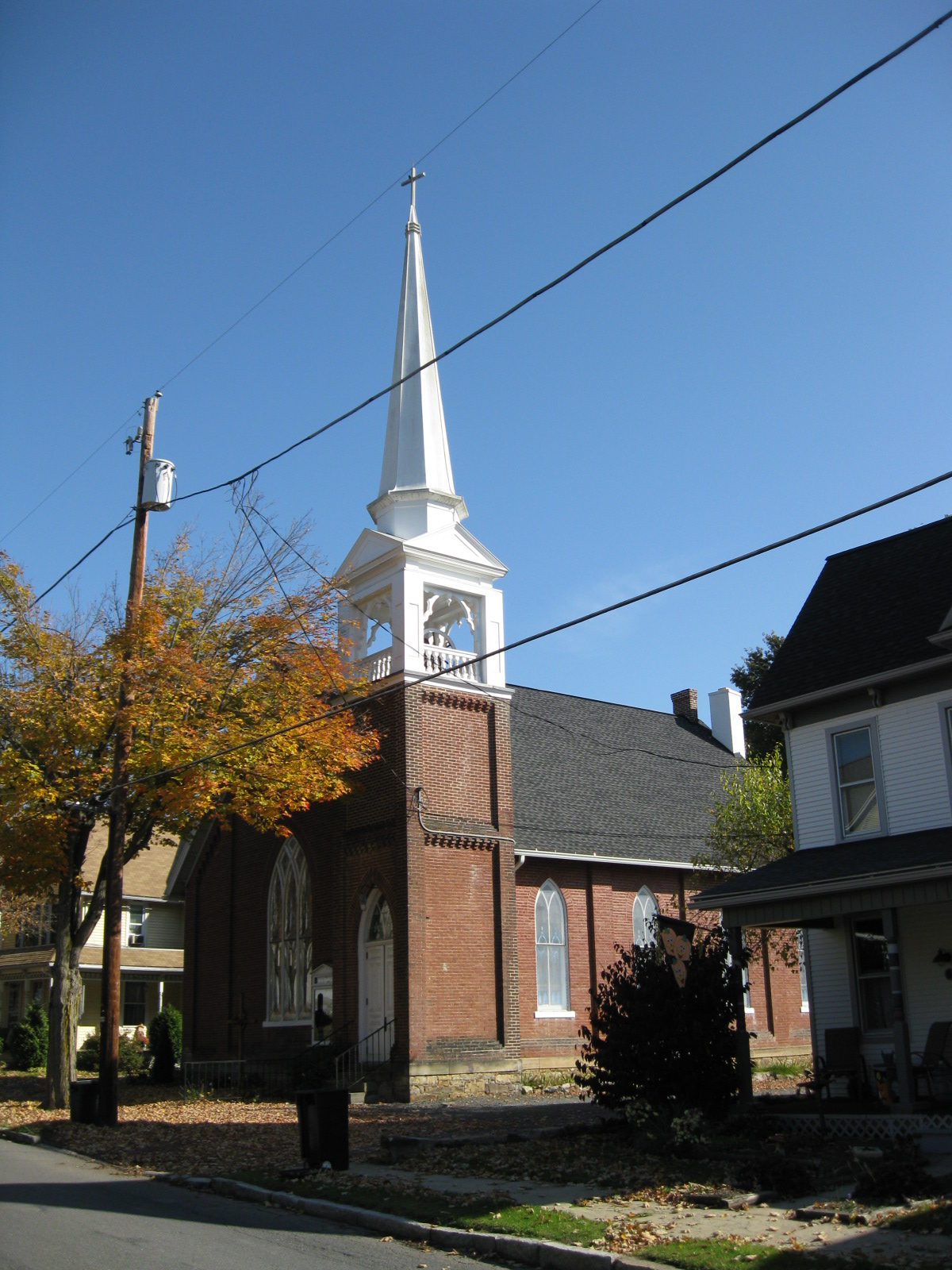
- Snydertown, Pennsylvania

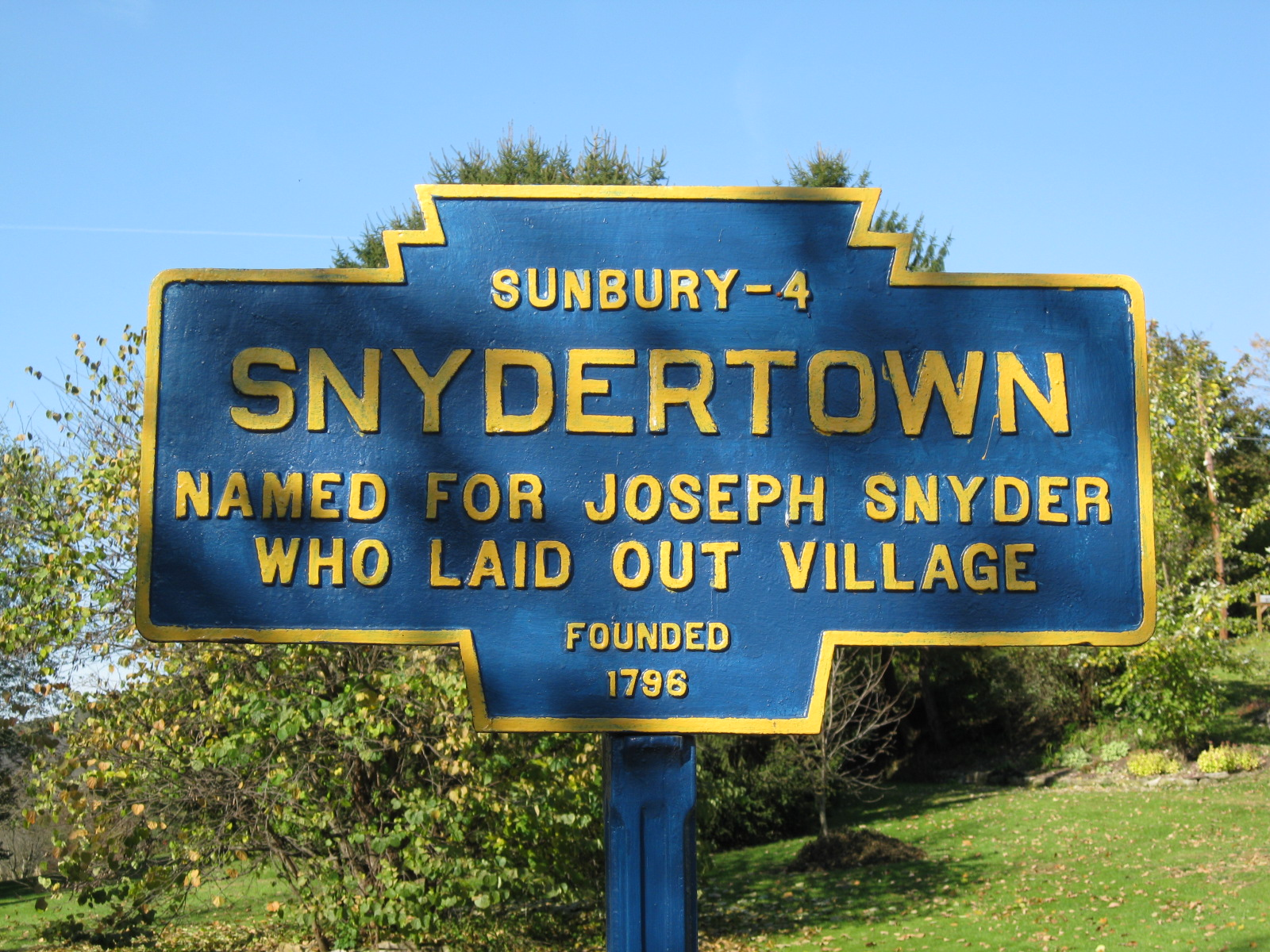
- Keystone marker

- Location of Snydertown in Northumberland County, Pennsylvania.

- Location on Snydertown in Pennsylvania Snydertown (the United States)
- Coordinates: 40°52′24″N 76°40′14″W
- Country: United States
- State: Pennsylvania
- County: Northumberland
- Incorporated: 1871

Government
  - Type: Borough Council

Area
  - Total: 3.49 sq mi (9.04 km^{2})
  - Land: 3.43 sq mi (8.89 km^{2})
  - Water: 0.058 sq mi (0.15 km^{2})
- Elevation (benchmark at borough center): 534 ft (163 m)
- Highest elevation (hill at northeast boundary): 1,042 ft (318 m)
- Lowest elevation (Susquehanna River): 470 ft (140 m)

Population (2020)
  - Total: 325
  - Density: 94.7/sq mi (36.55/km^{2})
- Time zone: UTC-5 (Eastern (EST))
  - Summer (DST): UTC-4 (EDT)
- Zip code: 17877
- Area code: 570
- FIPS code: 42-71688
- GNIS feature ID: 1215518

Snydertown is a borough in Northumberland County, Pennsylvania, United States. As of the 2020 census, the borough population was 325.

== History ==
The first owner of property in Snydertown was Godfrey Rockefeller. His land passed into the hands of Joseph Snyder, for whom Snydertown is named. Snydertown was incorporated from Shamokin Township in 1871.

== Geography ==
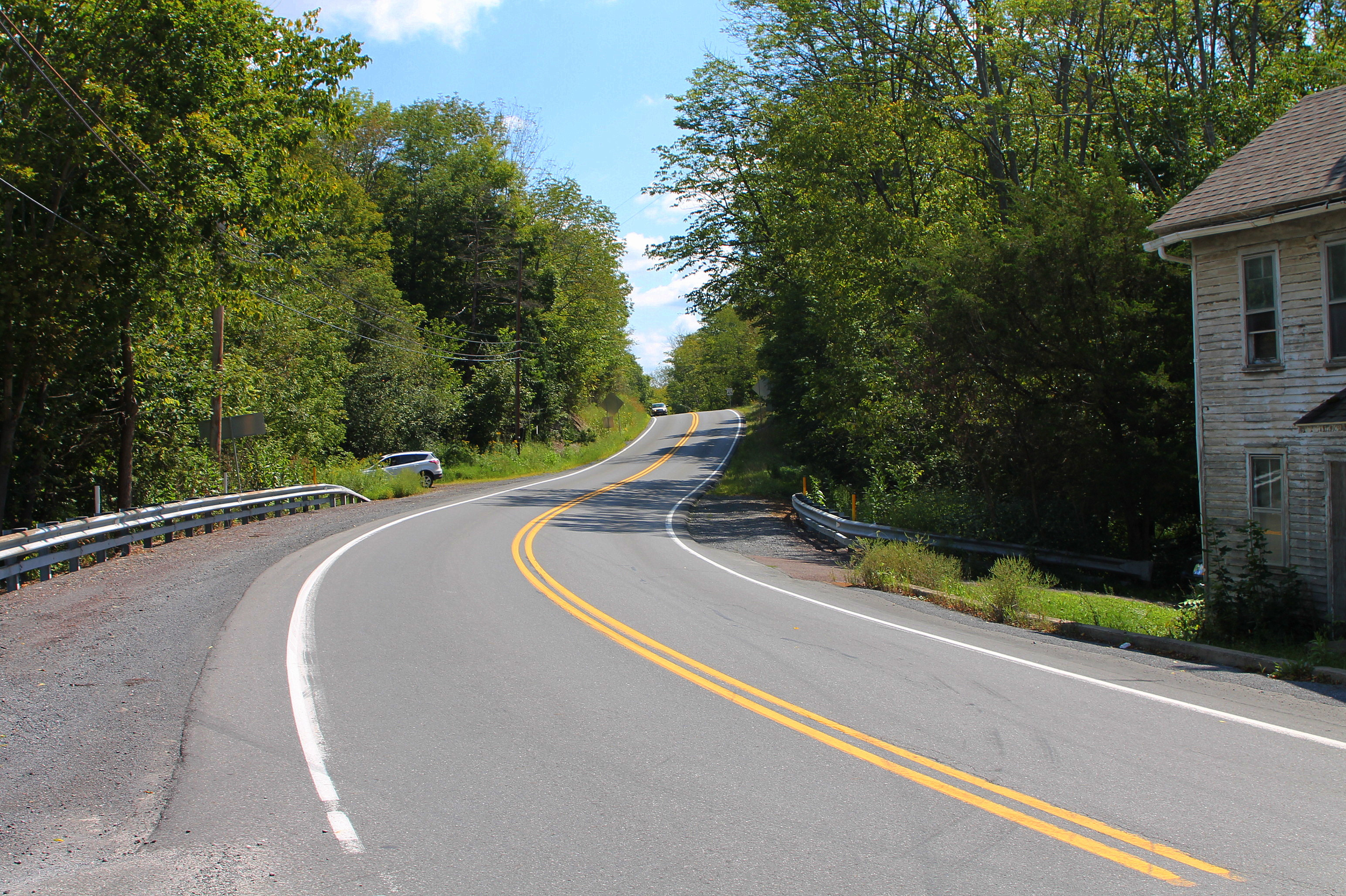
QR 4012 (Snydertown Road) in Snydertown

Snydertown is located at 40°52′24″N 76°40′14″W (40.873399, -76.670632). According to the United States Census Bureau, the borough has a total area of 3.5 square miles (9.0 km^{2}), all land.

Shamokin Creek passes through Snydertown. Most of Snydertown's terrain is hilly, but is flat near Shamokin Creek. Most of the land in the borough is forest, but there is some farmland.

== Demographics ==
Historical population
Census	Pop.	Note	%±
1880	260		—
1890	242		−6.9%
1900	276		14.0%
1910	288		4.3%
1920	321		11.5%
1930	273		−15.0%
1940	342		25.3%
1950	314		−8.2%
1960	278		−11.5%
1970	267		−4.0%
1980	358		34.1%
1990	416		16.2%
2000	357		−14.2%
2010	339		−5.0%
2020	325		−4.1%

As of the census of 2000, there were 357 people, 136 households, and 99 families residing in the borough. The population density was 102.4 inhabitants per square mile (39.5/km^{2}). There were 143 housing units at an average density of 41.0 per square mile (15.8/km^{2}). The racial makeup of the borough was 99.16% White, 0.56% Asian, and 0.28% from two or more races.

There were 136 households, out of which 31.6% had children under the age of 18 living with them, 61.0% were married couples living together, 7.4% had a female householder with no husband present, and 26.5% were non-families. 22.1% of all households were made up of individuals, and 7.4% had someone living alone who was 65 years of age or older. The average household size was 2.60 and the average family size was 3.04.

In the borough the population was spread out, with 23.8% under the age of 18, 6.7% from 18 to 24, 31.1% from 25 to 44, 26.6% from 45 to 64, and 11.8% who were 65 years of age or older. The median age was 39 years. For every 100 females there were 113.8 males. For every 100 females age 18 and over, there were 100.0 males.

The median income for a household in the borough was $40,250, and the median income for a family was $41,563. Males had a median income of $30,000 versus $20,625 for females. The per capita income for the borough was $15,107. About 5.9% of families and 7.6% of the population were below the poverty line, including 10.4% of those under age 18 and none of those age 65 or over.
