= Edward Palmer =

Edward Palmer may refer to:

- Edward Palmer (d.1624) (c.1555–1624), antiquary and projector of a university in Virginia
- Edward Palmer (socialist) (1802–1886), American religious socialist
- Edward Palmer (Canadian politician) (1809–1889), Prince Edward Island politician
- Edward Palmer (botanist) (1829–1911), British botanist and early American archaeologist
- Edward Palmer (Australian politician) (1842–1899), squatter, public servant and conservative Queensland politician
- Edward E. Palmer, first president of the SUNY College of Environmental Science and Forestry
- Edward Henry Palmer (1840–1882), British orientalist
- Edward L. Palmer Jr. (1877–1952), American architect
- Edward L. Palmer (1933–1999), media educator, researcher, author, and advocate
- Edward Timothy Palmer (1878–1947), member of parliament for Greenwich
- Edward Palmer (barrister) (1644–1667), of the Middle Temple
