= Susquehanna River Bridge =

Susquehanna River Bridge may refer to:

- CSX Susquehanna River Bridge, bridge in the locality of Havre de Grace and Perryville, Maryland, U.S.
- Port Deposit Bridge, bridge in Port Deposit, Maryland, U.S. Also known as Susquehanna River Bridge
- Susquehanna River Bridge (Interstate 76), bridge in Harrisburg, Pennsylvania, U.S.
- Susquehanna River Bridge (Northeast Corridor), bridge in the locality of Havre de Grace and Perryville, Maryland, U.S.

== See also ==
- List of crossings of the Susquehanna River
