= Port Deposit Gneiss =

- Stratigraphic range: Paleozoic
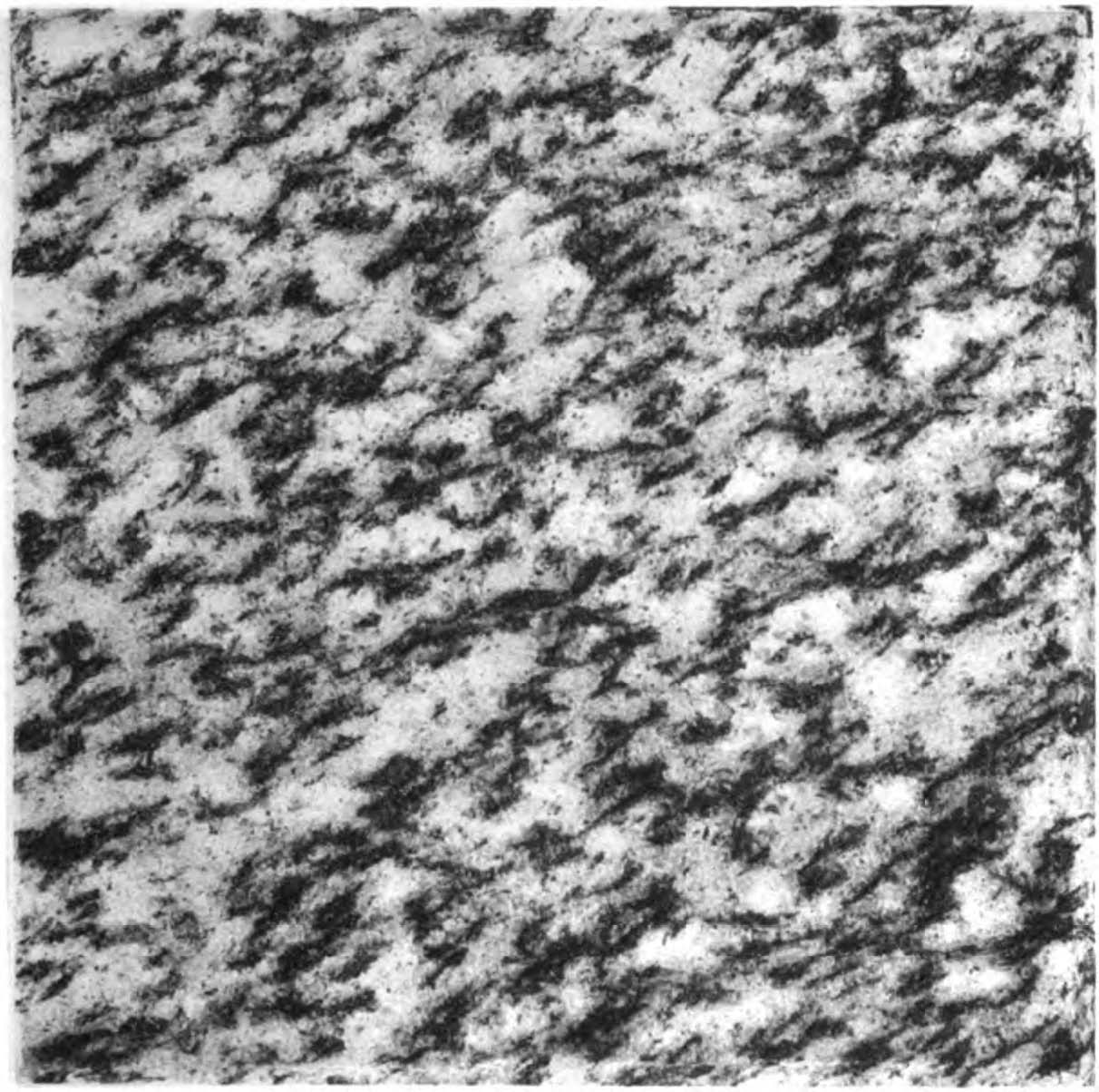
- Polished slab of the Port Deposit Gneiss, about 10.7 cm wide
- Type: metamorphic

Lithology
- Primary: gneiss

Location
- Region: Piedmont of Maryland
- Extent: eastern Maryland

Type section
- Named for: Port Deposit, Maryland

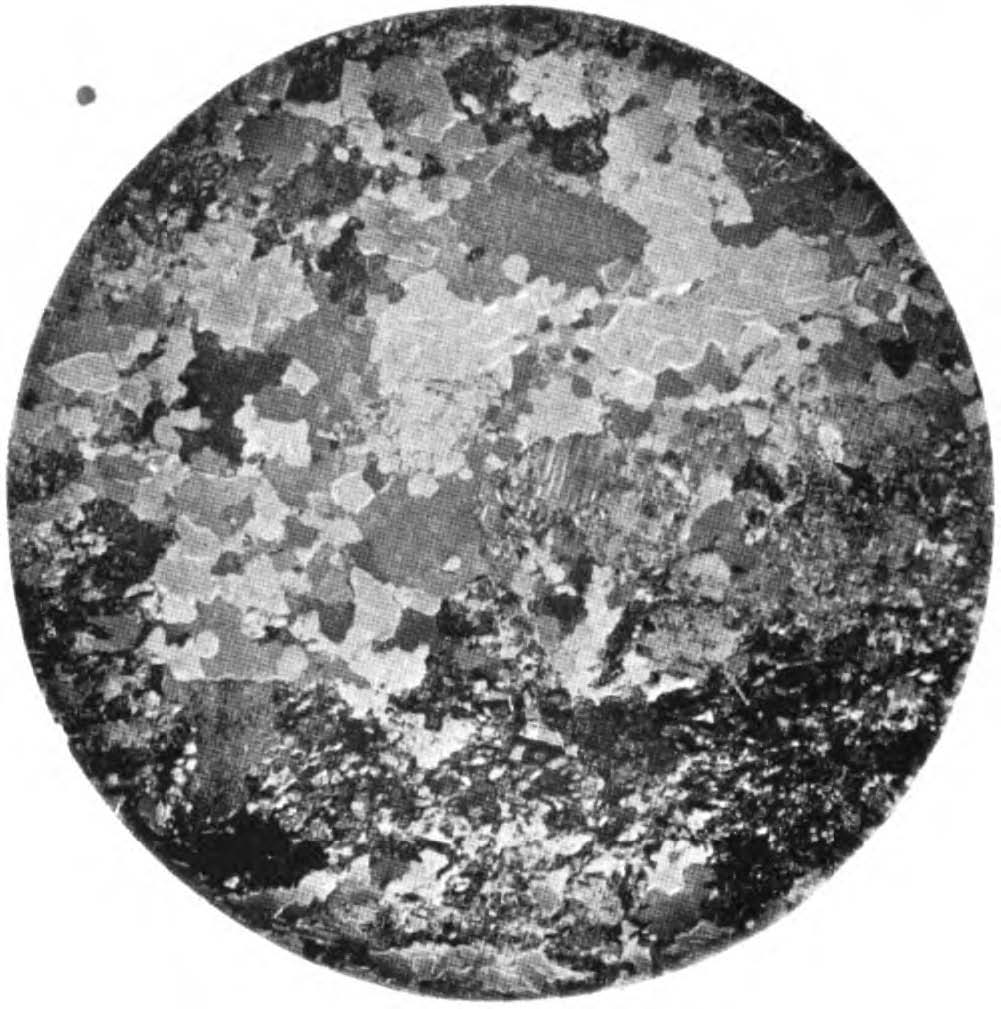
Photomicrograph of Port Deposit Gneiss, approximately 0.85 cm across, under crossed polarized light.

The Port Deposit Gneiss is a Paleozoic gneiss formation in Cecil County, Maryland. It is described as a "Moderately to strongly deformed intrusive complex, chiefly composed of quartz diorite gneiss. Rock types include gneissic biotite-quartz diorite, hornblende-biotite-quartz diorite, and biotite granodiorite, with minor amounts of quartz monzonite and hornblende-quartz diorite. Moderate protoclastic foliation grades into strong cataclastic shearing." It intrudes into the Volcanic Complex of Cecil County.

== Quarrying ==
The Port Deposit Gneiss has been quarried along the east as well as the west bank of the Susquehanna River for over 100 years.

Port Deposit Gneiss was used in:

- Many houses and five churches in Port Deposit
- Schools like the U.S. Naval Academy, Haverford College and The Catholic University of America
- Fort McHenry, Fort Delaware and Fort Carroll
- Public buildings like the Boston Public Library and the U.S. Treasury Building
- Public works like the Concord Point Lighthouse, Lincoln Tunnel and the St Augustine seawall
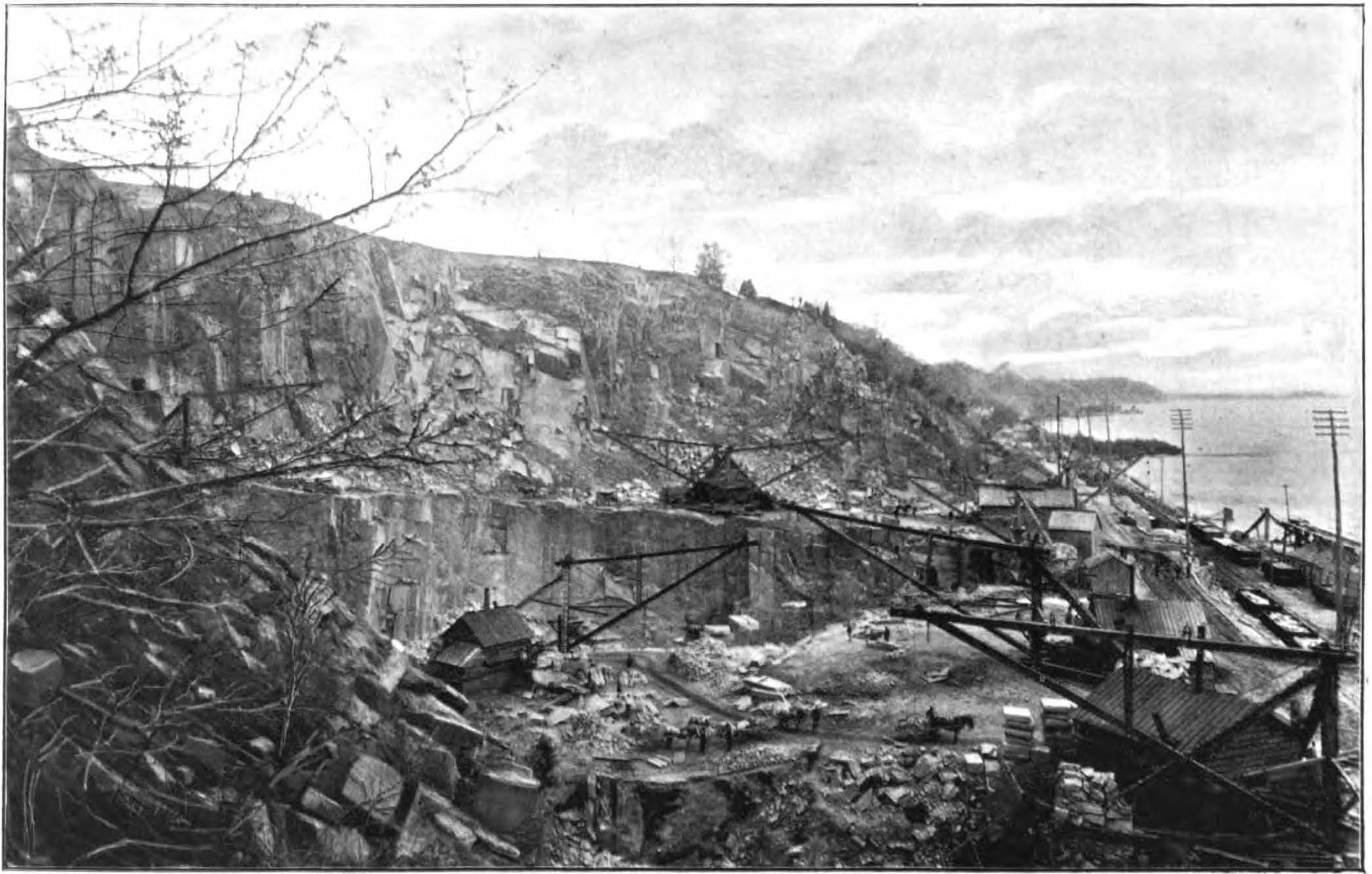
McClanahan "Granite" Quarry c. 1898

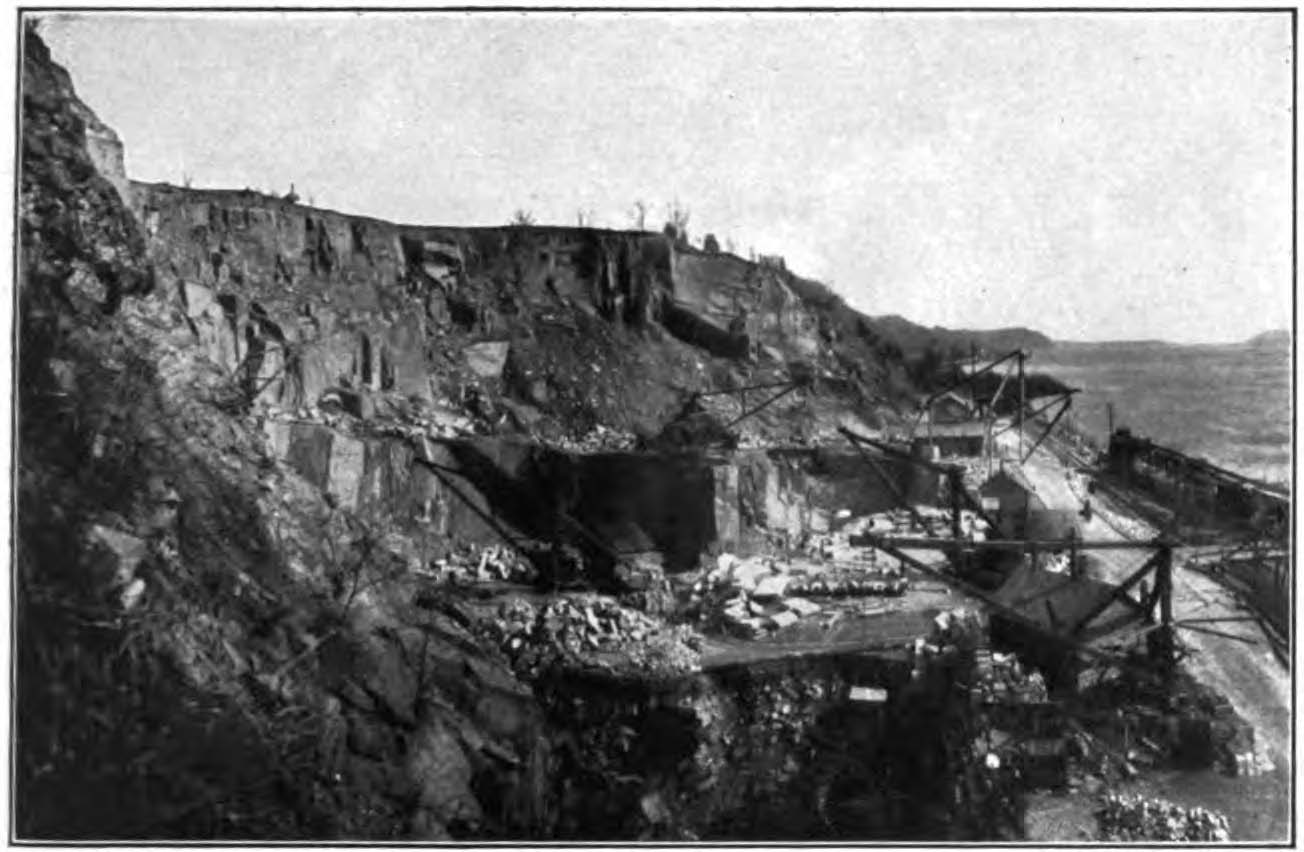
McClenahan Quarry c. 1910

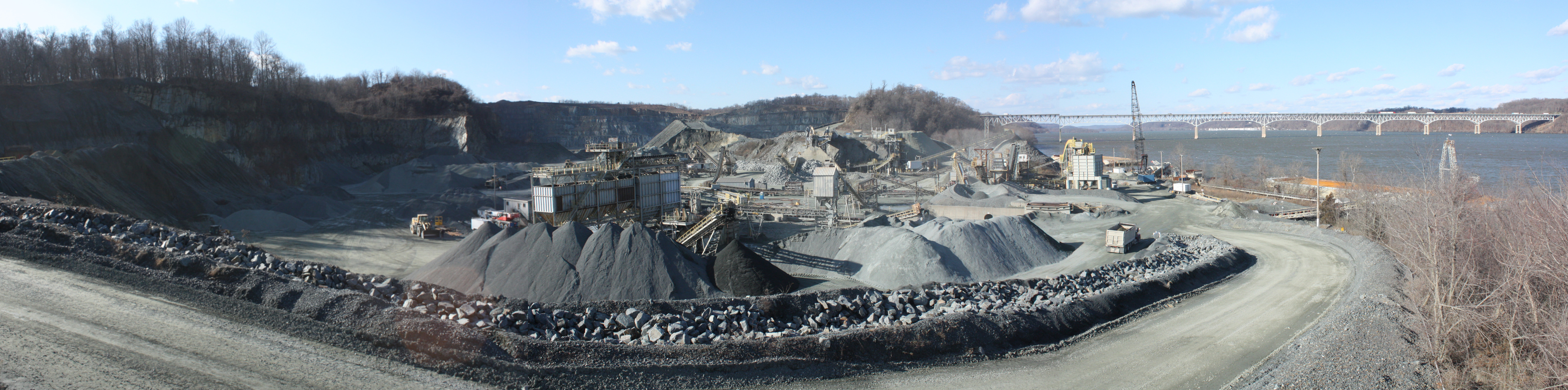
A present-day quarry across the Susquehanna River from Port Deposit in Havre de Grace, Maryland owned by Vulcan Materials Company, in January 2020
