= Garrett Island (Maryland) =

Island in Maryland, United States

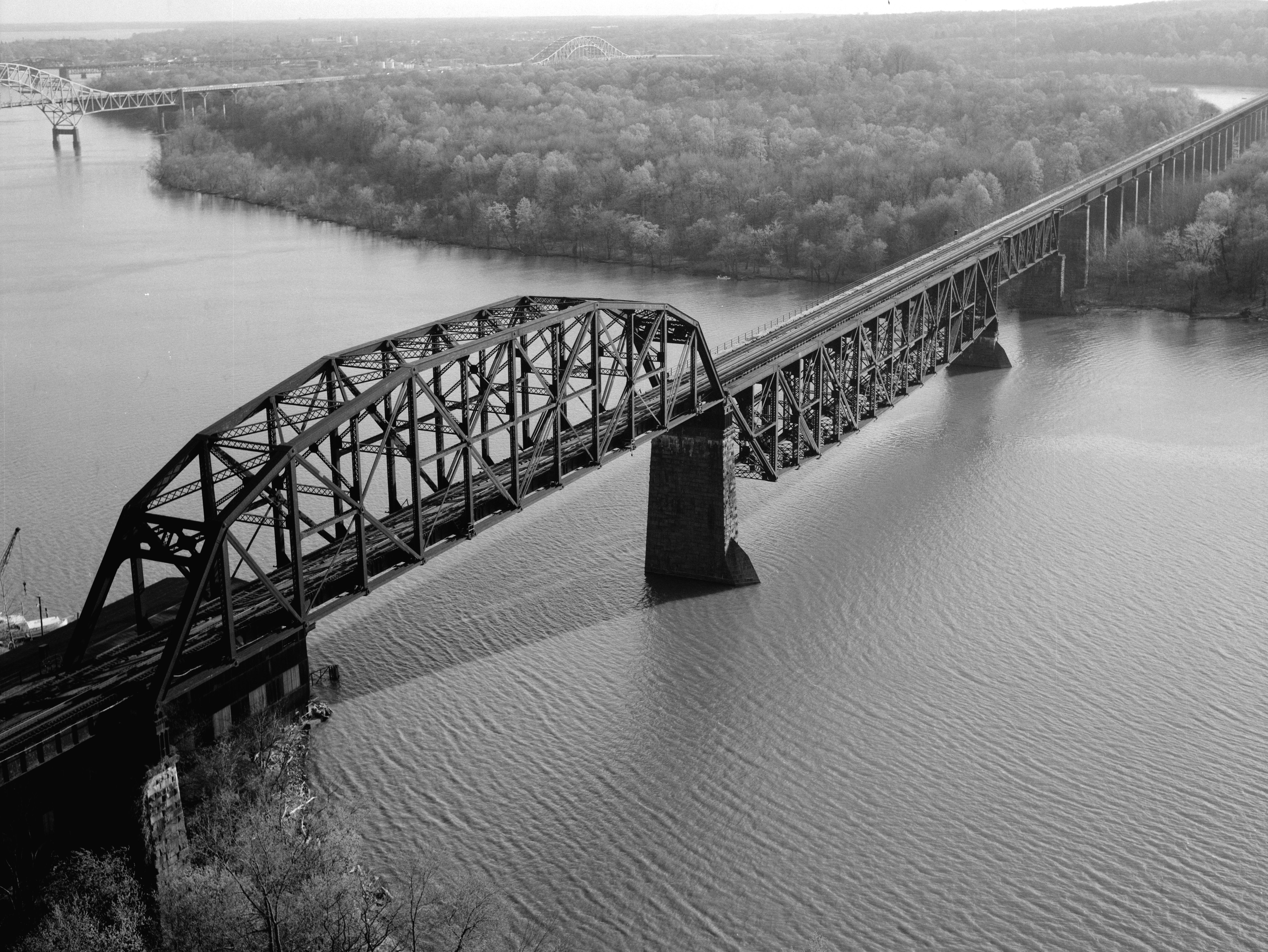
- CSX Susquehanna River Bridge crossing Garrett Island (center at top).
- Interactive map of Garrett Island

Geography
- Location: Cecil County, Maryland
- Coordinates: 39°33′54″N 76°05′20″W
- Area: 0.309375 sq mi (0.80128 km^{2})
- Highest elevation: 79 ft (24.1 m)

Administration
- United States

Demographics
- Population: 0

Garrett Island is an island located in Cecil County, Maryland, 1.8 miles (2.9 km) from the mouth of the Susquehanna River, directly west of Perryville and north of Havre de Grace. It is managed by the U.S. Fish and Wildlife Service as part of the Blackwater National Wildlife Refuge. The island is crossed by the CSX Susquehanna River Bridge on the north side and the Thomas J. Hatem Memorial Bridge on the south side.

== Geology ==
The Cecil Observer, quoting the Chesapeake Bay Journal, describes the geologic history of Garrett Island: "'Garrett Island is the geologic remnant of what was once an offshore volcano in an ancient sea. The rocky high ground on the island's west side is the remains of the volcanic core. Basalt and quartz formed by the volcanic activity are still present.'" Garrett Island is the only rocky island in the tidal waters of the Chesapeake Bay.

== History ==
Human presence on Garrett Island is known from 8,000 to 5,000 years ago. John Smith may have visited the island in 1608 but there is no definitive documentation proving this. In 1622, the island was given to Edward Palmer as part of a land grant by King James I, and the earliest documented European presence dates to 1637 when William Claiborne established a trading post on the island. In the same year, Maryland troops evicted Claiborne's Virginia traders from the Upper Chesapeake region and built Fort Conquest on what was then called "Palmer's Island." During the later colonial period, the island was farmed by a family named "Watson" and it eventually came to be called "Watson Island."

Watson Island was purchased by the Baltimore and Ohio Railroad (B&O) in the 1880s so a bridge could be built across the Susquehanna River at that point. The island was named after John W. Garrett, then president of the railroad.

== Wildlife ==
Garrett Island provides habitat for 44 species of birds including eagles, common loons, tundra swans, and 14 species of ducks.
