= Susan Kolb =

American physician and writer

Susan Kolb (born November 26, 1954) is a medical doctor in Atlanta, Georgia, and the author of The Naked Truth about Breast Implants: From Harm to Healing. Her area of specialization is plastic and reconstructive surgery. Kolb has been an active voice in the debate about the safety of breast implant devices since 1996. She has treated over 2,000 women suffering from breast implant disease and related systemic immune disorders.

== Biography ==
Susan Kolb was born on November 26, 1954, in Havre de Grace, Maryland to her parents, Doris and Gene Kolb. She joined the U.S Air Force and deployed to Wilford Hall Medical Center, in San Antonio, Texas. She completed a three-year course of general surgery, followed by a plastic surgery residency. She served as the Chief of Plastic Surgery at Wright Patterson Air Force Base from 1984-88. She established a craniofacial board that helped manage children with facial deformities. She helped plan the surgical hospitals that would be later used in Desert Storm, especially as they pertained to burn care.

She left the Air Force in 1988 and moved to Atlanta, Georgia and joined a private medical practice. In 1990, she left her medical practice for six months to study spiritual medicine. In 1995, she established Plastikos Surgery Center, where she used holistic treatment methods. In 1998, she founded Millennium Healthcare to address a broader range of medical conditions. In 1999, she established Avatar Cancer Center to treat cancer and serious viral illnesses.

=== Breast implant controversy ===
In 1996, Kolb wrote "Doctor, Are You Listening?", an article outlining the symptoms of silicone implant disease. The article was published on various Internet sites, and her practice became known to women seeking treatment for silicone-related conditions. Many women complained that their health concerns were often dismissed or denied by the other doctors. In 2010, she documented her treatment of women with breast implant disease in her book The Naked Truth about Implants: From Harm to Healing. The book includes a detailed history of the implant controversy and a review of the major research into complications of breast implants. Dr. Douglas Shanklin, Emeritus Professor of Pathology, Laboratory Medicine, and Obstetrics and Gynecology, who along with Dr. David L. Smalley, published most of the pertinent research in silicone biochemistry, wrote the foreword. The book outlines Kolb's treatment protocols and includes stories contributed by seven of her patients, as well as her own.

Kolb has been interviewed about her experience treating breast implant problems including chemical and biotoxicity on the Today Show with Katie Couric, Holistic Health Show with Dr. Carl Helvie, and Inside Cosmetic Surgery Today with Barry Lycka. She has been interviewed for articles about breast implants in Glamour Magazine, People Magazine, and in Vanity Insanity, a Canadian television documentary She also appears as a medical expert on three episodes of Animal Planet's Monsters Inside Me; in all three of her appearances, she treats a woman whose breast implants are contaminated with aspergillus fungi.

=== Integrative medicine ===
She has lectured and published articles on other topics, including 21st century medicine, spiritual medicine, environmental toxicity and the benefits of integrating science and spirituality in the practice of medical healing. Kolb is also an author of an anthology and a chapter on energy management. Kolb has hosted the monthly Atlanta Community Group for Noetic Science since 1996.

=== Weekly radio show ===
Since 1998, Kolb has hosted a weekly radio show, The Temple of Health, on BBS Radio. Kolb introduces a variety of medical topics related to traditional and holistic medicine, scientific breakthroughs, and various medical disorders. Her guests have included Dr. Bernie Siegel, Greg Braden, Dr. Andrew Weil and Dr. Amit Goswami.

== Publications ==
- The Naked Truth about Breast Implants: From Harm to Healing (2010)
- "The Spiritual Healer and Synthesis Medicine," in Goddess Shift: Women Leading for a Change by Stephanie Marohn.
- "Energy Management: A Blueprint for Optimism," in Optimism! Cultivating the Magic Quality That Can Extend Your Lifespan, Boost Your Energy and Make You Happy Now by Dawson Church and Stephanie Marohn.
- "Silicone Immune Treatment Protocol"
- "Doctor, Are You Listening?
- "Merging Traditional and Alternative Medicine."
- Holistic Medicine
- "Integrative Team Approach To Breast Carcinoma."
- "Twenty-First Century Healthcare: The Integrated Medical Center."
- "Spiritual Medicine."
- Contributions in Plastic Surgery Tales: A Look behind the Face of the Specialty (2004), by Robert Cooper.
- "Life After Breast Implants" Explant Info: Lynne Hayes (2012) Kolb contributed a condensed version of her story ― The Naked Truth About Breast Implants to "Life After Breast Implants"

== Criticism ==
Kolb's position on breast implant disease and the severity of complications arising from breast implant disease is controversial within the medical establishment. While earlier research studies suggested that certain autoimmune conditions may be related to breast implants, later research resulted in no conclusive epidemiological connection. Many plastic surgeons do not believe that these conditions exist and their position is supported by the American Association of Plastic Surgeons and the United States Food and Drug Administration. After removing silicone breast implants from the market (except in restricted circumstances) in 1992, the FDA re-approved them for consumer sales in 2006 as the result of later research. Kolb has questioned the wisdom of this move and has suggested that corporate interests have taken precedence over public health. She asserts that more recent research studies are flawed for several reasons: the elevation of epidemiological evidence over other traditional methods of diagnosis, such as clinical observation and pathology; breast implant manufacturers and plastic surgeons played a major role in designing and conducting the research; and the studies were conducted over a three to five-year period. Kolb associates the onset of symptoms of breast implant disease with the breakdown of the implants' elastomer shell which contains the silicone gel, which typically occurs between eight and twelve years after implantation.

Oxygen True Crime has investigated Dr. Kolb.
