= Thomas Palmer (burgess) =

Member of Virginia House of Burgesses

Thomas Palmer was an English settler of colonial Virginia. He arrived with his wife, Joan, eleven-year-old daughter Priscilla and servant Richard English on the Tyger in November 1621. The Palmers are listed as living at Jordan's Journey, which almost certainly saved their lives during the Indian Massacre of 1622. (Joan Palmer may have been a relation of Samuel Jordan.)

Palmer was one of the House of Burgesses at Jamestown on October 16 1629, representing Shirley Hundred Island (now Eppes Island).

Palmer was a first cousin of poet Sir Thomas Overbury, whose mother Mary (née Palmer) was the sister of Thomas Palmer's father, the noted antiquarian Edward Palmer.

== Bibliography ==
Palmer, Horace W. “Early Palmers of Virginia.” The William and Mary Quarterly, vol. 14, no. 1, 1934, pp. 16–19., www.jstor.org/stable/1916374.

Virginia. General Assembly. House of Burgesses; McIlwaine, H. R. (Henry Read), 1864–1934, ed; Kennedy, John Pendleton, 1871- , ed; Virginia State Library (https://archive.org/stream/journalsofhousb1619virg/journalsofhousb1619virg_djvu.txt)
