= Raid on Havre de Grace =

1813 engagement of the War of 1812

Coordinates: 39.540678°N 76.084685°W

- Part of the War of 1812
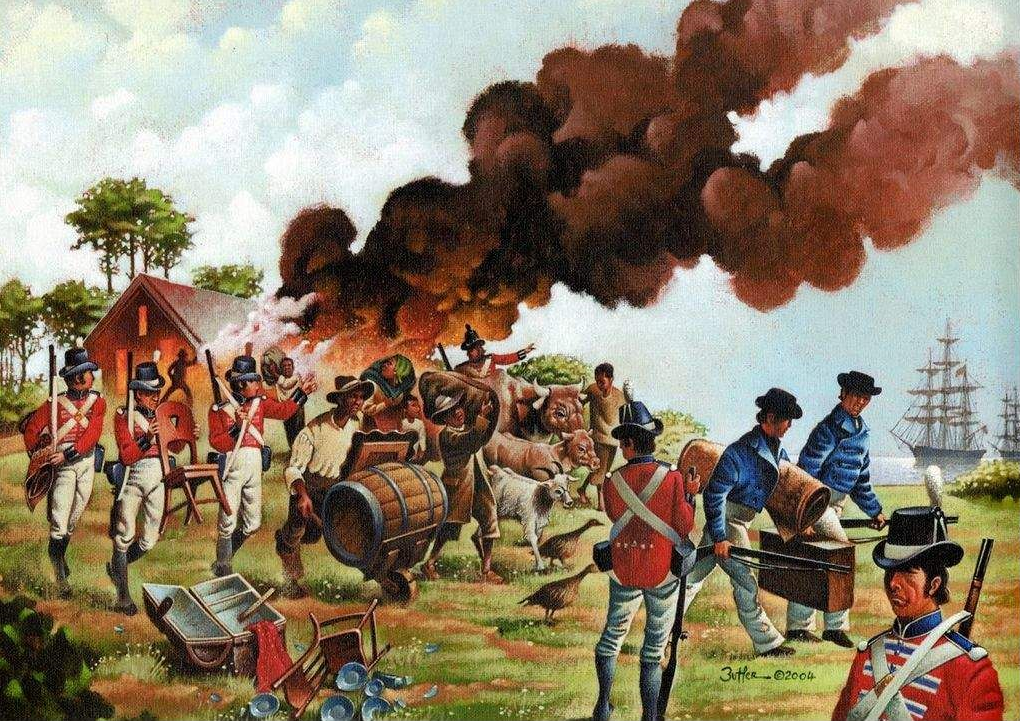
- An illustration of a British raid in the Chesapeake Bay during the war
Date	May 3, 1813
Location	Havre de Grace, Maryland
Result	British victory

Belligerents
United Kingdom	United States

Commanders and leaders
George Cockburn; John Lawrence; George Augustus Westphal (WIA)	John O'Neill

Strength
150 Royal Marines; Royal Regiment of Artillery; Seamen	Fewer than 40 Maryland Militiamen

Casualties and losses
1 wounded	1 dead
- Location within Maryland

The Raid on Havre de Grace was a seaborne raid that took place on 3 May 1813 during the broader War of 1812. A squadron of the British Royal Navy under Rear Admiral George Cockburn attacked the town of Havre de Grace, Maryland, at the mouth of the Susquehanna River. Cockburn's forces routed the town's defenders and sacked and burnt several buildings before withdrawing.

== Background ==
Cockburn sailed for the upper Chesapeake Bay from near Baltimore and occupied Spesutie Island on 23 April 1813. After a successful raid on Frenchtown on the Elk River on 29 April, Cockburn attempted to venture further upriver until forces at Fort Defiance stopped him.

Cockburn had vowed to destroy any American town that decided to violently resist him. He had not initially planned to attack Havre de Grace but when he saw an American flag flying over the town and a local American battery firing shots at his forces, he decided to attack.

== Attack ==
Cockburn's fleet was anchored off Turkey Point, separated from Havre de Grace by an area of shoal water too shallow for large ships to navigate. Cockburn therefore sent Commander John Lawrence at the head of a flotilla of sixteen or nineteen boats to row across the shoals, beginning at midnight on 3 May.

Despite or because of intelligence warning of an impending attack, most of the militia that had been in Havre de Grace had departed before the raid. Fewer than forty troops remained at the Concord Point battery when the flotilla attacked at dawn. These troops briefly returned fire until Congreve rockets were fired at the town, which killed a resident of Havre de Grace. Lieutenant George Augustus Westphal then stormed and captured the battery.

Second Lieutenant John O'Neill single-handedly manned another battery—the so-called "Potato Battery"—until his cannon's recoil struck him. O'Neill retreated to fire on the British with a musket while he unsuccessfully signaled the militia to return.

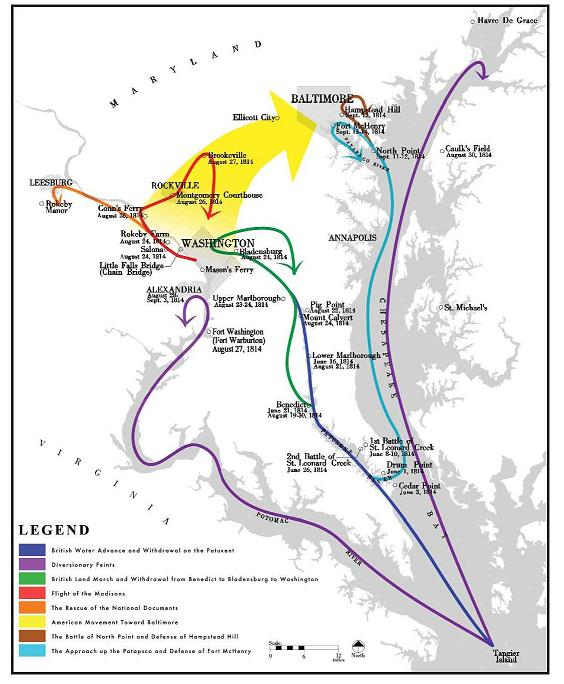

The townspeople and remaining militia retreated as the British drove them further from town. Westphal and his troops entered the town and burnt 40 of its 60 houses. They spared the Episcopal church from being burned, although they did vandalize it.

Cockburn removed six cannons from the town and took O'Neill and two other Americans back to his flagship, HMS Maidstone. However, Cockburn released O'Neill upon appeal from local magistrates. Cockburn reported only one injury: Westphal was shot in the hand.

After the raid on Havre de Grace, Cockburn sent troops up the Susquehanna River to destroy a depot and vessels there. British forces also navigated to nearby Principio Furnace, a large ironworks and cannon foundry, and destroyed the facilities there.

== Aftermath ==
Cockburn's account of the raid appeared in the London Gazette on 6 July 1813.

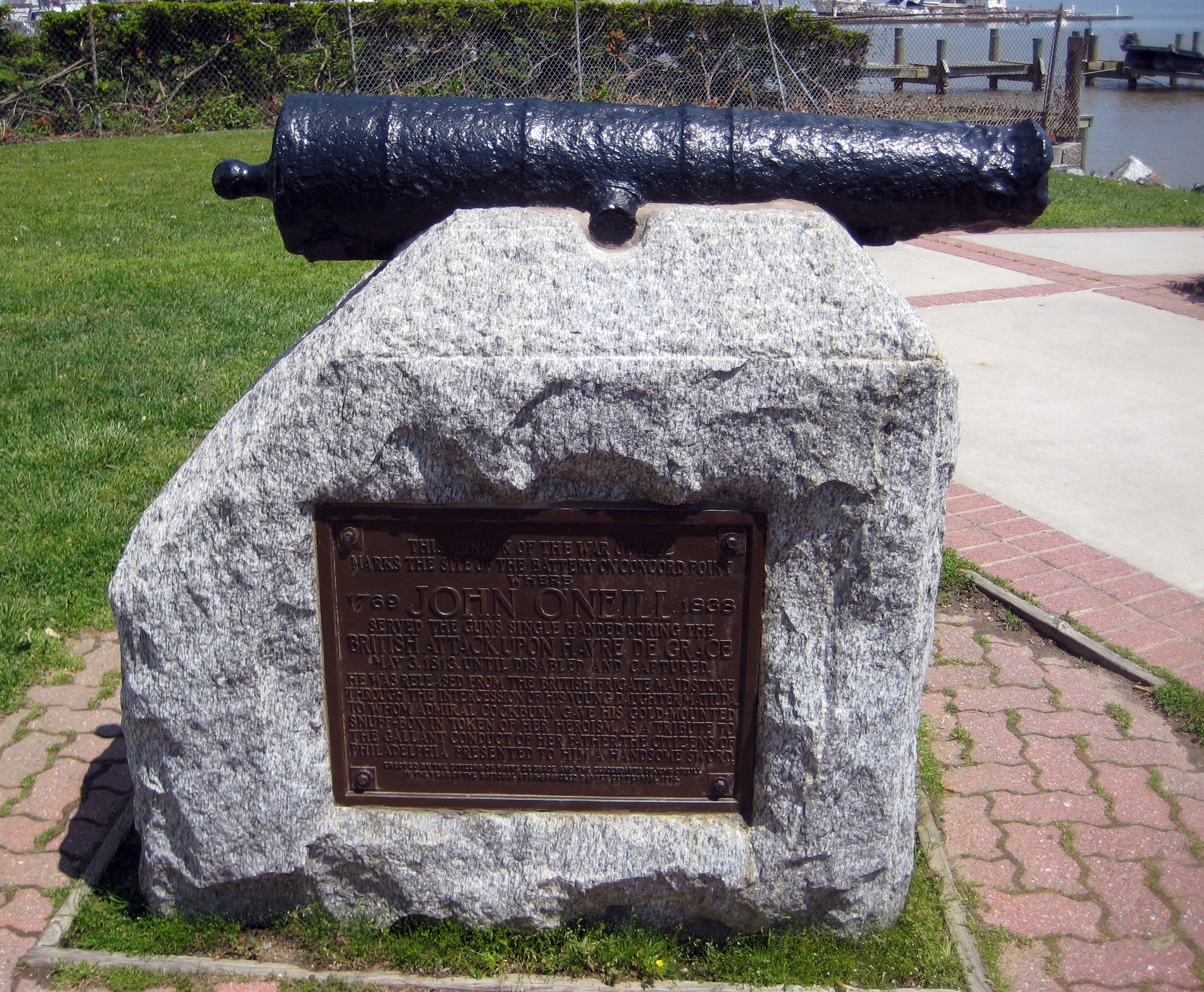
A memorial to John O'Neill featuring a War of 1812 cannon marks the site of the Concord Point battery in Havre de Grace.

Jared Sparks—an educator, historian, and later president of Harvard University—who was tutoring the children of a local family also saw the attack. Sparks wrote an account of the attack that was published in 1817 in the North American Review and Miscellaneous Journal.

James Jones Wilmer was living in Havre de Grace at the time and published an account of the incident soon after it happened.

Benjamin Henry Latrobe did not witness the event but is known to have written to Robert Fulton about it.

The raid was depicted in a near-contemporary etching by William Charles, a Scottish-born engraver who immigrated to the United States. The etching, Admiral Cockburn Burning & Plundering Havre de Grace, is now held by the Maryland Historical Society.

== See also ==
- List of War of 1812 battles
