= John O'Neill (lighthouse keeper) =

American military person and lighthouse keeper (1768–1838)

- Born: November 22, 1768; Ireland
- Died: January 26, 1838 (aged 69)
- Resting place: Angel Hill Cemetery; Havre de Grace, Maryland, U.S.
- Occupations: Military officer; manufacturer; lighthouse keeper
- Spouse: Mary
- Children: 3

John O'Neill (November 22, 1768 – January 26, 1838) was an American military officer, manufacturer and lighthouse keeper. He defended Havre de Grace, Maryland, during the Raid on Havre de Grace on May 3, 1813, during the War of 1812. He then served as lighthouse keeper at Concord Point Light from 1827 to his death.

== Early life ==
John O'Neill was born in Ireland on November 22, 1768. He came to America at the age of 18.

== Career ==
In 1794, O'Neill served under Henry Lee in the Whiskey Rebellion in Pennsylvania. Around 1798, O'Neill joined the United States Navy.

He then moved to Havre de Grace and bought a lot two streets from the shore. He started a nail factory there. He rebuilt the nail factory after it was damaged in the War of 1812.

In 1809, O'Neill was commissioned ensign of a company of militia in Maryland by Governor Edward Lloyd. During the War of 1812, O'Neill was the second lieutenant of a company of militia in the 42nd Regiment in Harford County. He manned the Potato Gun Battery, between Bourbon and Fountain streets in Havre de Grace on May 3, 1813, when the British raided Havre de Grace commanded by Lieutenant George Westphal. Other accounts claim that O'Neill manned a gun battery at Concord Point instead of the Potato Gun Battery. He was later captured in town while trying to rally the militia. He was held prisoner on the HMS Maidstone and was sentenced to be shot by Admiral George Cockburn. O'Neill was injured in the hip while firing the battery and wounded Lieutenant Westphal. His daughter Matilda is credited with helping encourage the release of O'Neill, but President James Madison stepped in to get him released.

For his defense of Havre de Grace, O'Neill was appointed as first keeper of Concord Point Light, a lighthouse in Havre de Grace, by President John Quincy Adams in 1827. He served in that role until his death.

== Personal life ==
O'Neill married Mary. They had two sons and one daughter, William, John and Matilda. His descendant Millard Tydings was a senator. O'Neill was a vestryman at St. John's Episcopal Church.

During the War of 1812, O'Neill lived at a house on Washington Street, between Bourbon and Fountain streets. He later lived at the lighthouse keeper's house, also known as the O'Neill House, across the street from the lighthouse.

O'Neill died on January 26, 1838. He was buried at Angel Hill Cemetery in Havre de Grace.

== Legacy ==
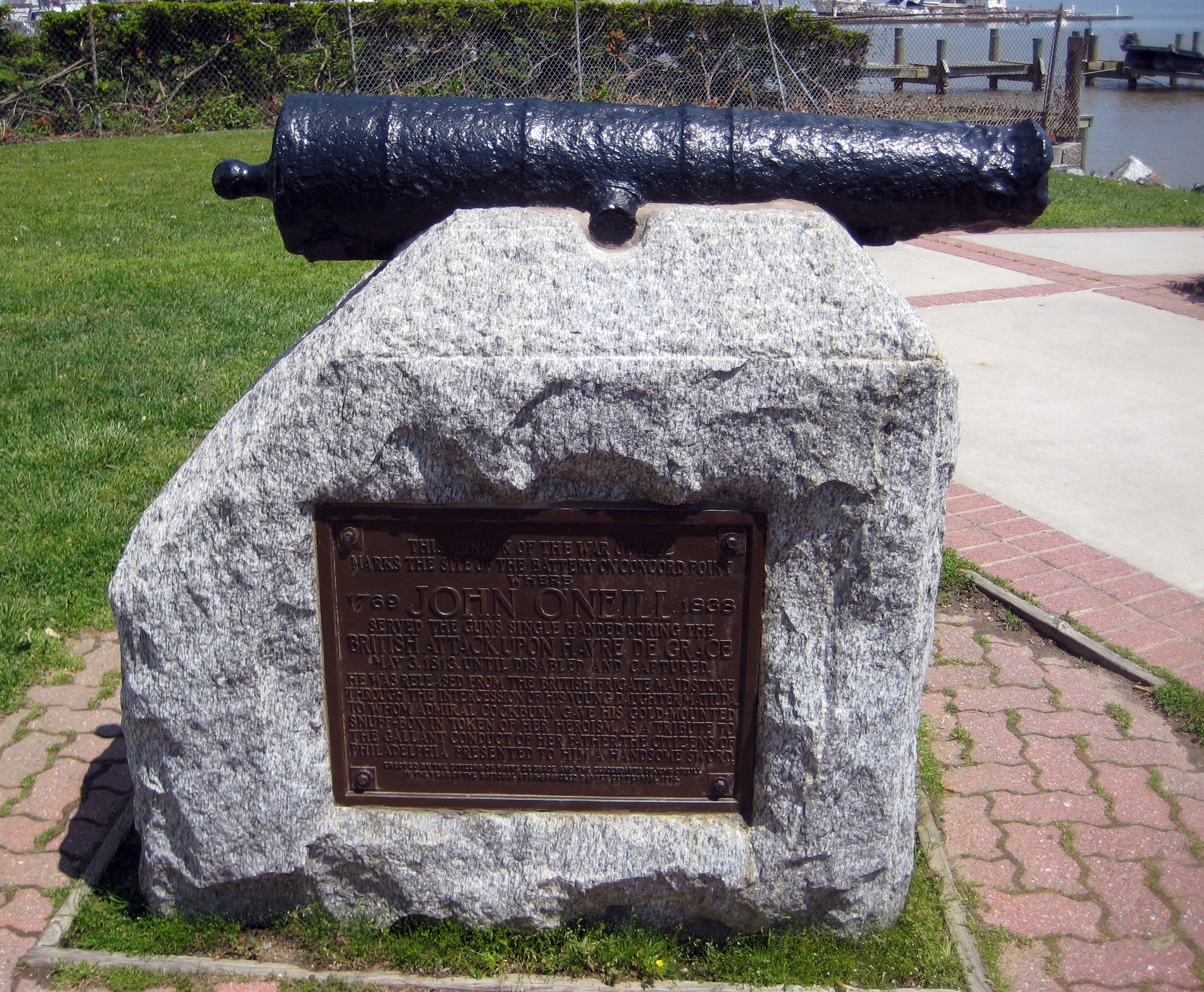
Memorial to O'Neill featuring a War of 1812 cannon marking the site of the Concord Point battery in Havre de Grace.

For his bravery, O'Neill received a sword from the City of Philadelphia on July 4, 1813. On November 14, 1914, a monument and cannon was dedicated at Concord Point to commemorate O'Neill.
