= Edward Palmer (socialist) =

Edward Palmer (1802 – February 25, 1886) was an American religious enthusiast and advocate of socialist reforms. He lectured against the use of money, advocating a simple barter economy among neighbors. His publications include An Address on the Origin and Evil Influences of Money (Boston, 1839).

Appletons' Cyclopedia of American Biography wrote of him: "He became a printer in Boston, Mass., and attracted attention by writing and publishing a pamphlet in which he demanded the abolition of slavery and the suppression of capitalized monopolies. Removing to New York city, he associated himself with a coterie of philosophers, under the leadership of Marcus Spring, and promulgated many eccentric ideas. He claimed that men should work for higher motives than that of pecuniary gain, and emphasized his teachings by refusing to accept money for his services, confining himself to the barest necessities of life. At his death he had passed out of recollection, as he had lived in retirement for nearly a generation."

He travelled and lectured extensively and was known to the Transcendentalists and other early utopian socialist experimenters. On October 14, 1838, Palmer visited with Ralph Waldo Emerson, and Emerson made several entries in his journal about Palmer's ideas and his experiences. Emerson described Palmer as "a gentle, faithful, sensible, well-balanced man for an enthusiast," and wrote: "He has renounced since a year ago last April the use of money. When he travels he stops at night at a house & asks if it would give them any satisfaction to lodge a traveller without money or price? [...] He presents his views with much gentleness; & is not troubled if he cannot show the way in which the destruction of money is to be brought about; he feels no responsibility to show or know the details. It is enough for him that he is sure it must fall & that he clears himself of the institution altogether."

Palmer attended several public conversations with Amos Bronson Alcott, and Alcott described him in 1838: "Palmer is a rare man. Entirely free from all superstitious regard for the past, simple, meek, docile, loving, he seeks for the best in all his thinking. He is a child of Love. He has faith in its might. [...] I have seen him but a few times. My interest in him increases at every interviews. What a noble fact it is that a man, simple, meek, modest, beyond almost all men, should arise, in these days of gold, to expose the selfishness, pride, injustice, cruelty, to which the demon leads, and illustrate the charm and beauty of Love!"

Palmer's views influenced Henry Thoreau as well; his forswearing of social institutions which he found unpalatable is a clear antecedent to Civil Disobedience.
