= Susquehanna River Bridge (Northeast Corridor) =

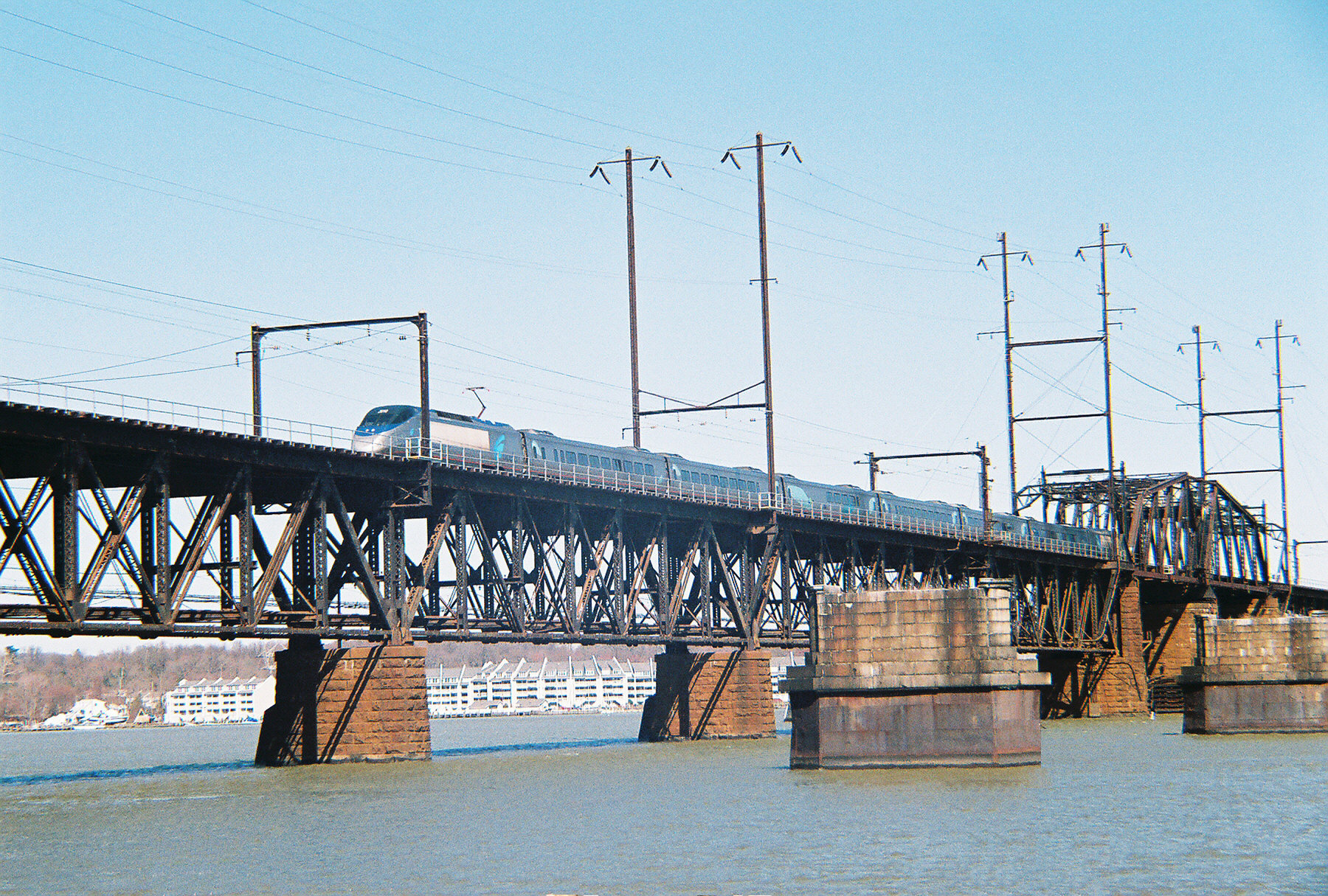
- A southbound Acela Express crosses the bridge in 2008. The since-demolished piers of the predecessor bridge are visible on the right.
- Coordinates: 39.55427°N 76.08625°W
- Carries: Amtrak Northeast Corridor rail line
- Crosses: Susquehanna River
- Locale: Havre de Grace and Perryville, Maryland, United States
- Official name: Susquehanna River Movable Bridge
- Owner: Amtrak

Characteristics
- Design: Howe deck truss
- Material: Steel
- Total length: 4,153.8 ft (1,266.1 m)
- No. of spans: 17 fixed spans, 1 swing span
- Clearance below: 52 ft (15.8 m) closed; 127 ft (38.7 m) open

Rail characteristics
- No. of tracks: 2
- Track gauge: 1,435 mm (4 ft 8 1/2 in) standard gauge

History
- Constructed by: Pennsylvania Steel Company and American Bridge Company
- Opened: November 26, 1866
- Rebuilt: 1904–May 29, 1906; 2020s–2036

Statistics
- Daily traffic: Up to 114 daily passenger and freight trains

Location
- Interactive map of Susquehanna River Bridge

The Susquehanna River Bridge is a deck truss bridge that carries the Northeast Corridor rail line across the Susquehanna River between Havre de Grace and Perryville, Maryland, United States. Both the bridge and the Northeast Corridor are owned by Amtrak. The 4,153-foot-long (1,266 m) two-track bridge has 17 fixed spans and one swing span across the river's navigation channel. It carries up to 114 daily passenger and freight trains.

The first bridge at the site was opened in 1866 by the Philadelphia, Wilmington and Baltimore Railroad, replacing a train ferry service in use since 1837. The Pennsylvania Railroad opened the current bridge in 1906; the older bridge was reused as a road bridge from 1909 to 1940 and demolished in 1942–43. Several rounds of repairs and rehabilitation took place from the 1960s to the 2000s. Construction of a pair of two-track replacement bridges is expected to begin around 2026 and continue through 2036.

== Design and operations ==
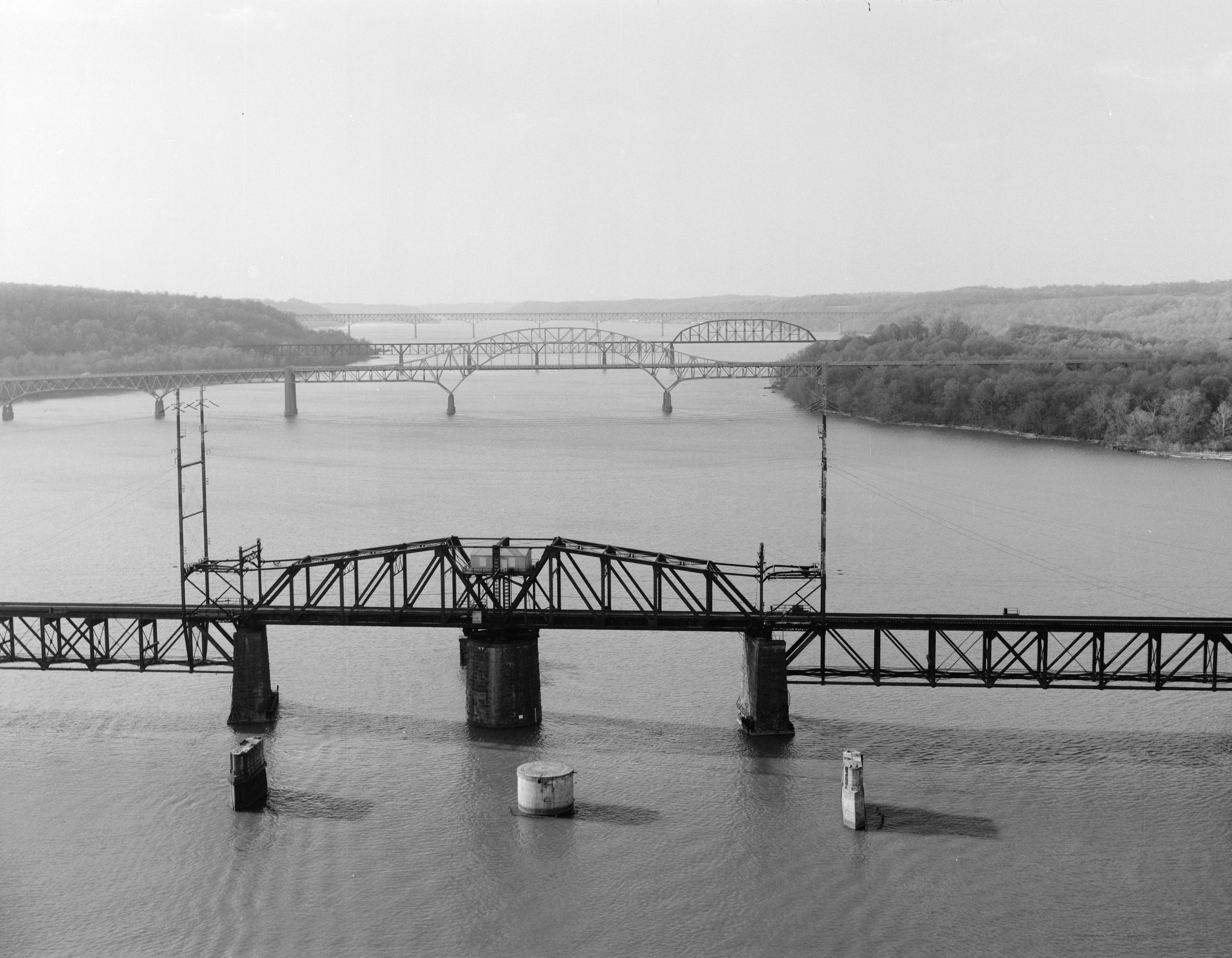
Aerial view of center swing span in 1977. Stone piers of the 1866 bridge can be seen in the foreground.

The bridge crosses the Susquehanna River between Havre de Grace and Perryville, Maryland, 1.0 mile (1.6 km) above its mouth. It is 4,153.8 feet (1,266.1 m) long with 18 steel truss spans on masonry supports. From north to south, there is one span of 197 feet 2 inches (60.10 m), eight of 260 feet (79 m), a swing span of 280 feet (85 m), seven spans of 200 feet (61 m), and one of 196 feet 6 inches (59.89 m). The northernmost two and southernmost two spans are primarily over land; the end spans cross over Broad Street in Perryville and North Union Avenue in Havre de Grace.

The bridge carries two tracks of the Northeast Corridor rail line. As of 2024, it is used by up to 90 Amtrak intercity trains and 14 MARC Penn Line commuter trains per day. Maximum speed over the bridge is 90 miles per hour (140 km/h), slower than the 135 miles per hour (217 km/h) allowed on adjacent sections of the Northeast Corridor. The bridge is also used by up to 10 daily freight trains, which are operated by Norfolk Southern Railway under a trackage rights agreement. Freight trains are limited to 30 miles per hour (48 km/h) over the bridge and are generally operated during nighttime hours to avoid interfering with passenger operations.

The Susquehanna River Bridge is the longest moveable bridge on the Northeast Corridor. Vertical clearance under the swing span is 52 feet (15.8 m) above mean high water when closed and 127 feet (38.7 m) when open. It has two channels, each 100 feet (30 m) wide. The only significant commercial water traffic under the bridge – barges from a Vulcan Materials Company quarry just upstream of Havre de Grace – does not require it to be opened. The bridge's swing span is opened about 10 times a year for barge cranes working on upstream bridges, private vessels using nearby marinas, and occasional upstream trips of the Martha Lewis. Vessels that require an opening must provide 24-hour advance notice. Due to the older design of the swing span, each opening requires more than 30 Amtrak workers on site.

== History ==
=== First bridge ===
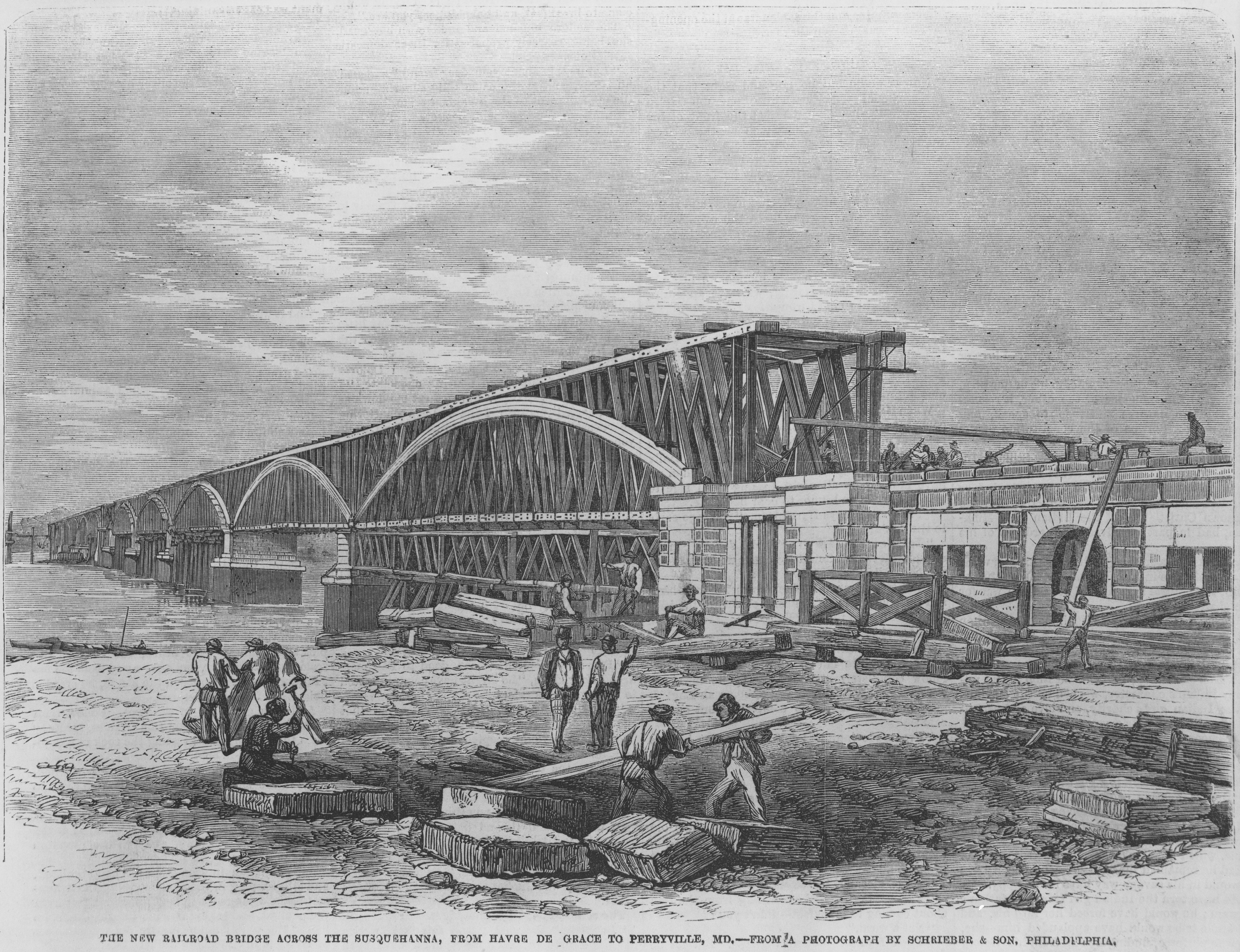
1866 illustration of the first bridge under construction

The Philadelphia, Wilmington and Baltimore Railroad opened north from Baltimore to Havre de Grace on July 6, 1837. The Wilmington and Susquehanna Railroad opened south from Wilmington, Delaware, to Perryville on July 31, 1837. This completed a rail line between Baltimore and Wilmington (and soon Philadelphia) save for the crossing of the Susquehanna. The railroads were merged in 1838 as the Philadelphia, Wilmington and Baltimore Railroad (PW&B). A train ferry, the Susquehanna, carried passengers (on foot) and freight cars across the river. It was replaced in 1854 by the larger Maryland, which also transported passenger cars.

Despite winter ice often stopping ferry service, opposition from upstream interests prevented the PW&B from obtaining legislative permission to bridge the river. Not until May 1852 – after a winter where temporary tracks were laid upon the thick ice to maintain service – was permission issued. The PW&B began construction of a wooden truss bridge in 1862. The masonry and most of the wooden spans were complete in 1866, but a tornado destroyed ten of the spans on July 25, 1866. Repairs were quickly made and the first locomotive crossed the bridge on November 20, 1866. The cost of construction, including rebuilding most of the truss portions, was $2.27 million (equivalent to $38.1 million in 2025). Passenger trains began service over the bridge on November 28, 1866. The bridge was 3,269 feet (996 m) long with 13 spans.

Iron reinforcements were added between 1874 and 1879, followed by a new swing span in March 1880. Granite for the rebuilt piers was quarried in nearby Port Deposit, Maryland. The Pennsylvania Railroad (PRR) took control of the PW&B in 1881. Its rival, the Baltimore and Ohio Railroad (B&O), used trackage rights over the PW&B. The PRR ended the agreement in 1884 before the B&O finished a parallel route between Baltimore and Philadelphia. That route, which included a new bridge about 1 mile (1.6 km) upstream from the PW&B bridge, opened in 1886.

=== Second bridge ===
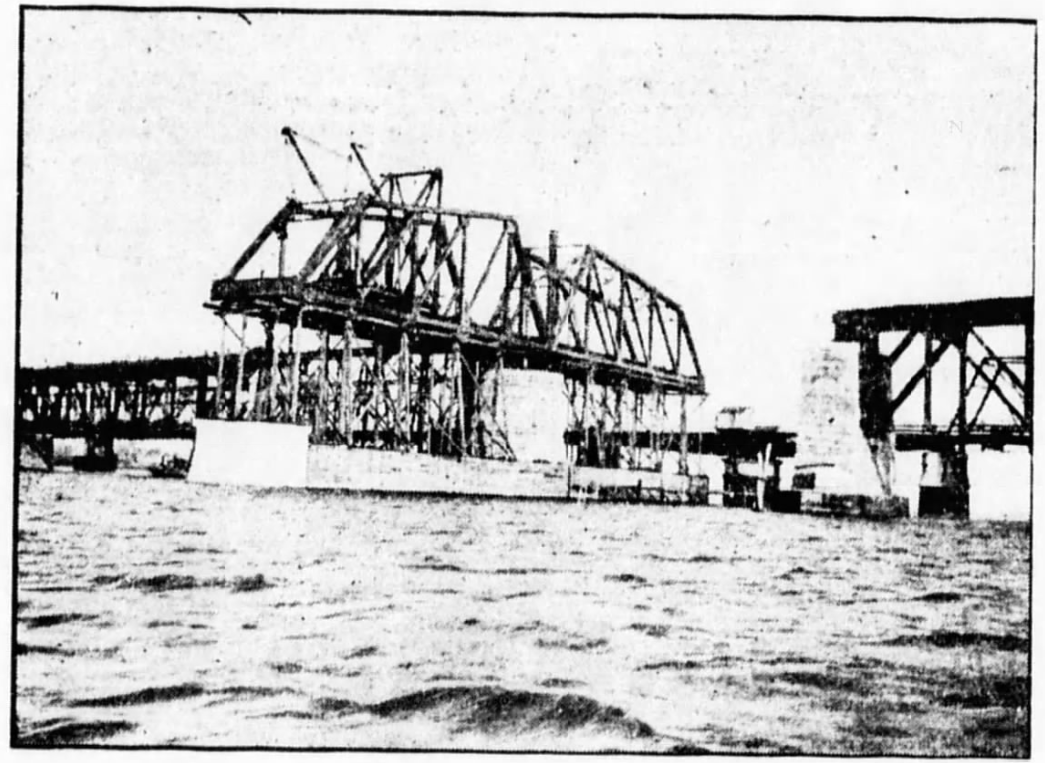
Construction of the second bridge in 1906

In 1904–06, the PRR replaced the PW&B crossing with a new bridge just upstream from the old bridge. Construction on the main structure started on August 5, 1905, and the first train rode over the bridge on May 26, 1906. The Pennsylvania Steel Company erected the west half of the bridge; the American Bridge Company erected the east half. A strike of American Bridge Company's employees delayed construction. The bridge opened for regular traffic on May 29, 1906.

In 1934, the PRR began installing catenary on the 1906-built bridge to help extend 11,000-volt electrification south from Wilmington to Washington, D.C. Passenger service over the bridge began using the electrification on February 10, 1935. Amtrak acquired most of the Northeast Corridor infrastructure, including the bridge, in April 1976. Significant repairs and rehabilitation of the bridge took place in the 1960s, 1985, 1991, and 1998. In 2005 and 2007, Amtrak replaced the ties on the bridge, installed continuous welded rail, and installed new deck-level maintenance walkways – changes meant to extend the life of the bridge by 20 to 25 years.

=== Reuse of first bridge ===
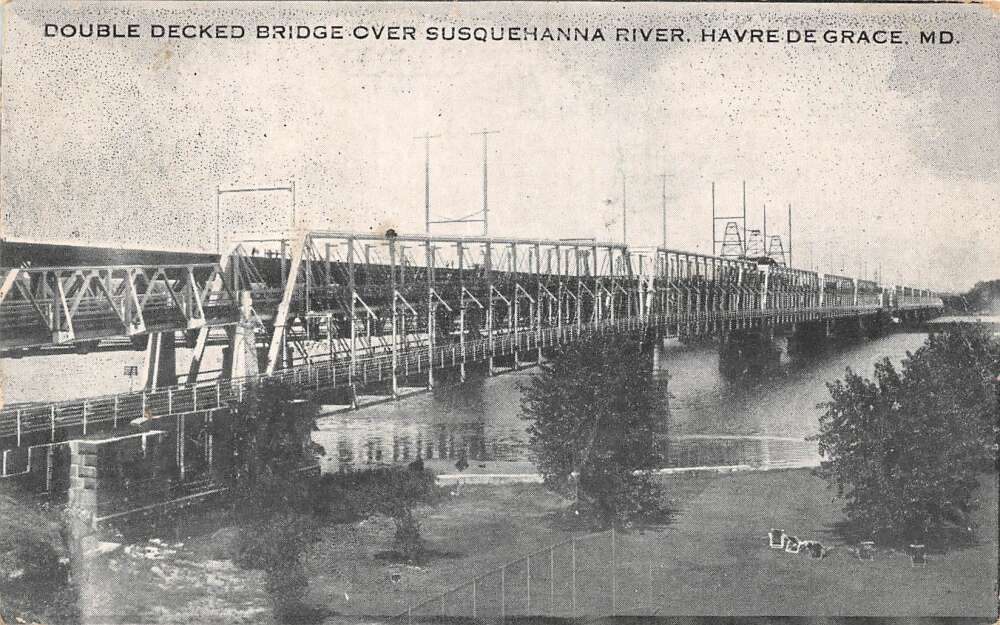
The double-decked road bridge around 1935. The 1906-built rail bridge with overhead lines installed is visible behind.

The PRR offered the old bridge to the city of Havre de Grace and the counties as a road bridge, but the offer was declined. The swing span was removed by request of the War Department to aid navigation. In 1909, the PRR spent about $100,000 (equivalent to $2.49 million in 2025) to convert it to a road bridge with a new swing span and a wider deck. The railroad sold the bridge for $700 (equivalent to $25,000 in 2025) to a private firm, which reopened it as a toll bridge on December 15, 1909. This allowed the PRR to shed its obligation to carry passengers for free between Perryville and Havre de Grace on some trains, which had been a condition of the original construction of the bridge.

The state purchased the road bridge for $585,000 (equivalent to $8.36 million in 2025) in February 1923. During 1927, the state added a second deck at a cost of $450,000 (equivalent to $6.52 million in 2025) to separate directions of traffic. It was claimed to be the first double-deck road bridge in the world. Tolls on the bridge were removed on September 15, 1928. The Susquehanna River Toll Bridge upstream opened on August 28, 1940, and the older road bridge was closed. Demolition of the old bridge for wartime scrap metal began in December 1942 and was completed in April 1943. The piers were not demolished and remained in the river next to the rail bridge.

=== Replacement ===
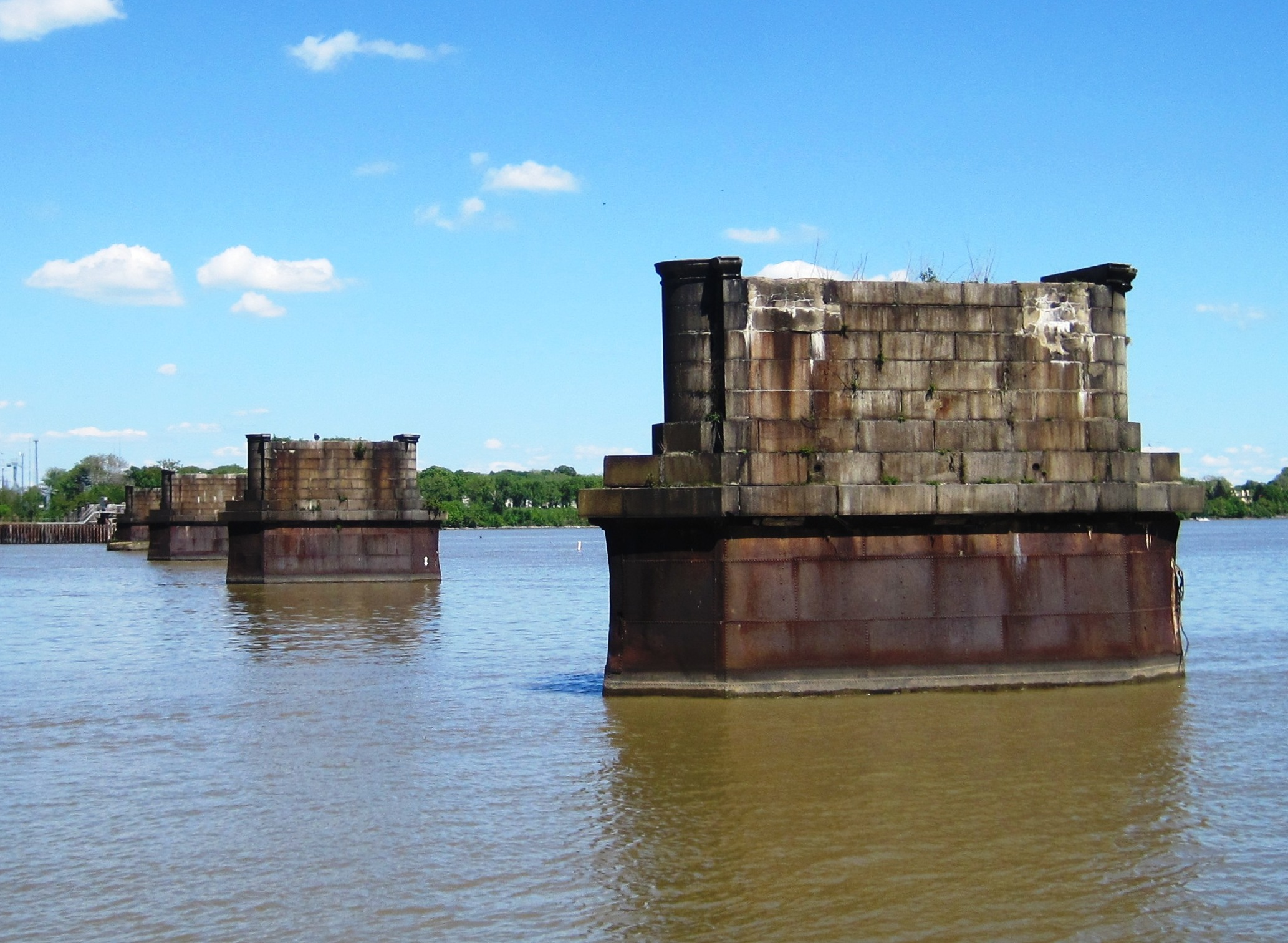
The remaining piers of the first bridge in 2023. The bridge deck was demolished in 1943, but the piers were not removed until 2024.

Amtrak reports in 2009 and 2010 identified replacement of the bridge with a higher fixed span as a high priority for the railroad. In May 2011, the U.S. Department of Transportation awarded $22 million for engineering and environmental work. Preliminary engineering work began in 2013. The environmental impact report was released in 2017. The report analyzed 24 alternatives, including rehabilitation of the existing bridge and construction of one or two new bridges. Both chosen alternatives called for two 2-track bridges – one just upstream with a maximum speed of 90 miles per hour (140 km/h), and one on the site of the existing bridge. They varied only in the maximum speed of the second bridge – 150 miles per hour (240 km/h) or 160 miles per hour (260 km/h) – with the latter requiring reconstruction of an overhead road bridge in Havre de Grace. Girder spans with a tied arch over the navigation channel were chosen. Reuse of the 1866 bridge piers for a bicycle and pedestrian bridge was considered, but was found infeasible due to their poor condition.

In November 2022, Amtrak announced that the bridge replacement would proceed, with design and construction contracts to be awarded in 2023. Amtrak was awarded $2.1 billion for the project from the Infrastructure Investment and Jobs Act in November 2023. It awarded the main construction contract and two supporting contracts in December 2023. Removal of the ten remaining piers of the 1866 bridge began in early 2024 and was completed that December. Several stones were preserved for use by the municipalities of Perryville and Havre de Grace.

The new bridges will have 60 feet (18 m) of vertical clearance and 235 feet (72 m) of horizontal clearance. The south bridge will have a maximum speed of 160 miles per hour (260 km/h). The project includes modernization of 5 miles (8.0 km) of tracks around the bridge, including three interlockings. By March 2024, construction of the new bridges was scheduled to begin in 2025 and finish by 2036 with a total project cost of $2.7 billion. Pre-construction activities including an archeological survey were completed in late 2025, but construction did not begin that year.
