= Edward Palmer (d.1624) =

Edward Palmer (c. 1555–1624) was a gentleman with antiquarian interests from Gloucestershire, England. During his life he was known for his extensive collection, notably of Roman coins: William Camden called him "a curious and diligent Antiquarie". He is perhaps best remembered for his purchase of the then-unnamed Garrett Island in the American colony of Virginia (present-day Maryland), which he designated for the establishment of what would have been the first university in the English colonies.

== Early years and personal life ==
He was the eldest son of Giles Palmer, and grandson of John Palmer, born in Upper Lemington, in the parish of Todenham, Gloucester. He was a student of Magdalen College, Oxford, in about 1570, but did not graduate. He was admitted to the Middle Temple in 1575, where his contemporaries included the antiquaries Henry Ferrers and Richard Carew.

Palmer married Muriel Palmer, a kinswoman, the daughter of Richard Palmer of Compton Scorpin, Ilmington, Warwickshire. They had at least three sons (including Thomas Palmer, who emigrated to colonial Virginia in 1621) and four daughters.

== Plan for University in the Colony of Virginia ==
In 1622, Palmer received a patent for land from the Virginia Company of London.

In his will made 22 November 1624, Palmer bequeathed his lands "in Virginia and New England" to his sons and nephew and declared that, should their issue fail, the land would be used for the founding of a university to be called "Academia Virginiensis et Oxoniensis", the Academy of the Virgin and Oxford. Of note is the peculiar instruction Palmer gave for two resident painters to be retained at the university who were to provide painting instruction to the faculty during their time of recreation. According to one author, Palmer was making preparations for the university when he died. The project died with the embezzlement of Palmer's treasury after his death.

=== Settlement on Garrett Island ===
According to historian Edward Duffield Neill, extant letters from John Pory confirm a settlement of fur traders of nearly 100 men on present-day Garrett Island sometime before Pory returned to England in 1624. In his 1881 work on the history of Cecil County, Maryland, George Johnston further asserts this settlement was established by William Claiborne and that the presence of scholarly books discovered there in 1637 by Lord Baltimore indicate the one-time presence of Palmer on the island. These historians make the case that Palmer's purpose was to establish his university on the island.

== Bibliography ==
- Broadway, Jan (2008) [2004]. "Palmer, Edward (c. 1555–1624), antiquary". Oxford Dictionary of National Biography (online ed.). Oxford University Press. doi:10.1093/ref:odnb/21179. (Subscription, Wikipedia Library access or UK public library membership required.)
- Chandler, Alfred N. (1945). Land Title Origins: a tale of force and fraud. New York: Robert Schalkenbach Foundation. p. 273. ISBN 9781893122895.
- Johnston, George (1881). History of Cecil County, Maryland. Elkton, Maryland. pp. 7–8.
- Neill, Edward D., ed. (1885). Virginia Vetusta. Albany, N.Y.: Joel Munsell's Sons. pp. 184–185.
- The New-England Historical and Genealogical Register. Vol. 32. Boston: New-England Historical, Genealogical Society. 1878. pp. 398–400. ISBN 9780788402920.
- Withington, Lothrop (1980). Virginia Gleanings in England: abstracts of 17th and 18th-century English wills and administrations relating to Virginia and Virginians: a consolidation of articles from published in the Virginia magazine of history and biography between 1903 and 1916. Baltimore: Genealogical Publishing Co. pp. 210–11. ISBN 9780806308692.
