= Havre de Grace, Maryland =

- City
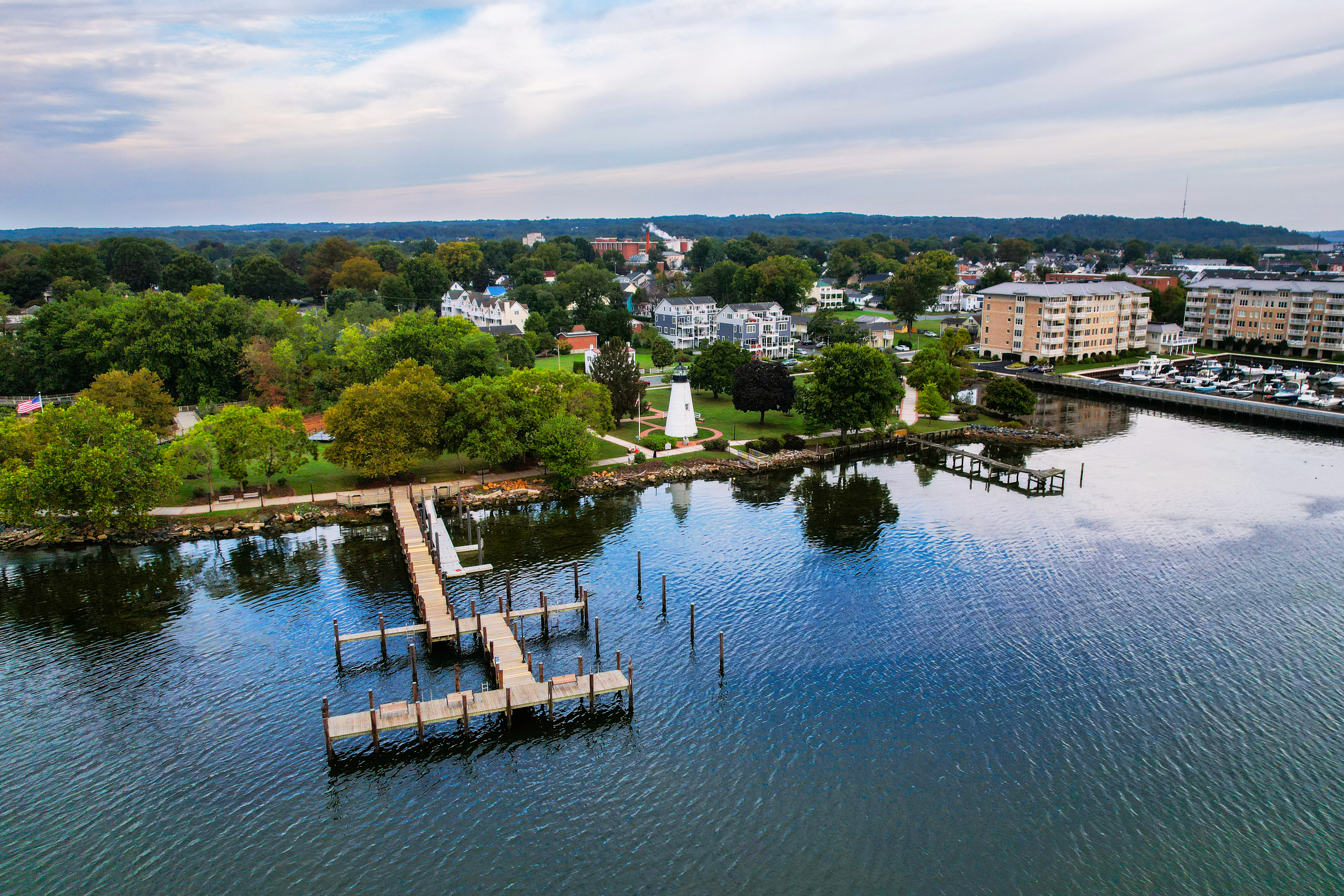
- Havre de Grace waterfront at Concord Point Light

- Flag Seal
- Nickname: "HdG"
- Location in Harford County and Maryland
- Coordinates: 39°32′54″N 76°5′51″W
- Country: United States
- State: Maryland
- County: Harford
- Incorporated: 1785

Government
  - Mayor: William Martin

Area
  - Total: 6.32 sq mi (16.37 km^{2})
  - Land: 5.89 sq mi (15.25 km^{2})
  - Water: 0.43 sq mi (1.12 km^{2}) 20.17%
- Elevation: 56 ft (17 m)

Population (2020)
  - Total: 14,807
  - Density: 2,514.4/sq mi (970.83/km^{2})
- Time zone: UTC−5 (Eastern)
  - Summer (DST): UTC−4 (Eastern)
- ZIP Code: 21078
- Area code: 410
- FIPS code: 24-37600
- GNIS feature ID: 0590437
- Website: https://havredegracemd.gov/

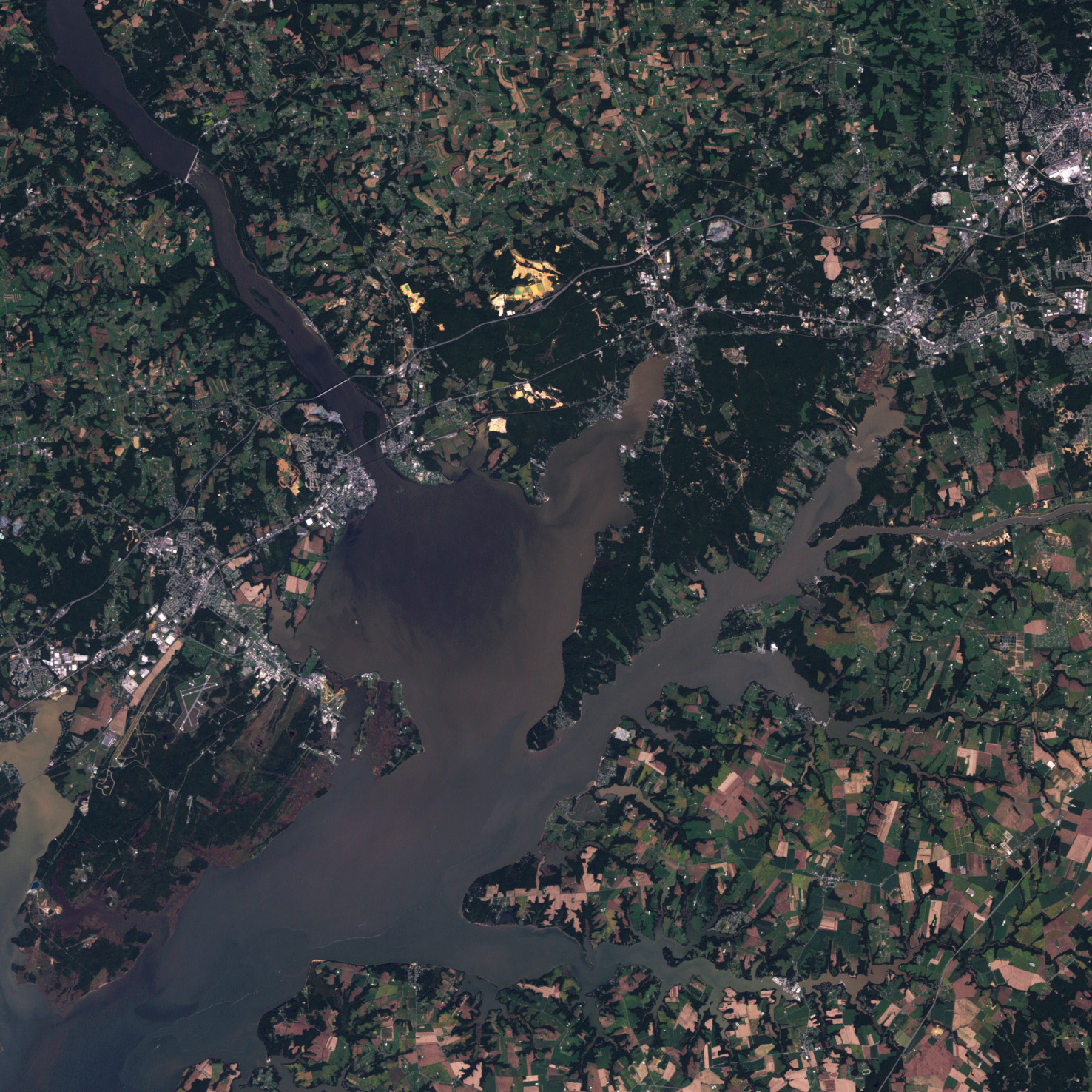
Satellite image of the Chesapeake Bay's confluence with Susquehanna River and the Maryland cities of Havre de Grace (southwest bank) and Perryville (northeast bank)

Havre de Grace (/hævər dɪˈɡreɪs/), abbreviated HdG, is a city in Harford County, Maryland, United States. It is situated at the mouth of the Susquehanna River and the head of the Chesapeake Bay. It is named after the port city of Le Havre, France, which in full was once Le Havre de Grâce (French for 'Harbor of Grace').

As of the 2020 census, Havre de Grace had a population of 14,807. In 2014, Smithsonian magazine called it one of the 20 best small U.S. towns to visit.

== History ==
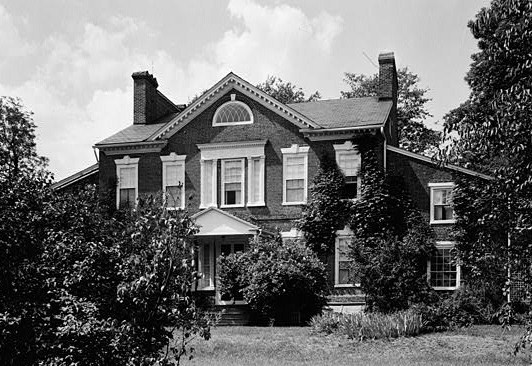
Sion Hill, 1936

=== Early history ===
During the Revolutionary War, the small hamlet known as Harmer's Town was visited several times by General Lafayette, who became considered a hero of the war. He commented that the area reminded him of the French seaport of Le Havre on the English Channel. It had originally been named Le Havre-de-Grâce. Inspired by Lafayette's comments, the residents incorporated the town as Havre de Grace in 1785.

George Washington stayed overnight in the town in 1789, on the journey to New York City for his first inauguration. During the First Congress in 1789, Havre de Grace missed by only one vote being named the capital of the fledgling United States.

=== 19th century ===
On May 3, 1813, during the War of 1812, British forces led by Sir George Cockburn executed a raid on Havre de Grace, routing the American militiamen defending it and burning large parts of the village. American Lieutenant John O'Neill single-handedly manned a cannon to help defend the town. He was wounded, captured by the British, and quickly released. In gratitude, Havre de Grace made O'Neill and his descendants the hereditary keepers of the Concord Point lighthouse, which marks the mouth of the Susquehanna River.

The early industry of Havre de Grace included oyster and crab harvesting. Extensive fruit orchards were cultivated in and near the town. Products were shipped to markets along the East Coast and upriver.

The town was the southern terminus for the Proprietors of the Susquehanna Canal and later the Susquehanna and Tidewater Canal. This was built to bypass difficult navigational areas of the lower Susquehanna River between Havre de Grace and Wrightsville, Pennsylvania, where it connected to the Pennsylvania Canal. It was built between 1836 and 1840. Operations on the canal declined after 1855, because of competition from railroads, which could carry freight more quickly. The Lock Keeper's house and remnants of the canal exist today as a museum.

Havre de Grace was a primary town on the Eastern route of the Underground Railroad in Maryland, as refugee slaves could cross the Susquehanna to havens in the free state of Pennsylvania, traveling on to Philadelphia and New York. Prior to 1840, escaped slaves from communities along the western shore of the Chesapeake Bay came to Havre de Grace and often took the ferry across the Susquehanna River to safe sites in Lancaster and Chester counties in Pennsylvania. When "vigilance increased at the ferry", the African-American refugees were guided upriver to cross to Columbia, Pennsylvania, a town established by abolitionist Quakers. Because Havre de Grace had varied transportation across the river, refugees were often successful in making their way to the North.

In the 19th century, Havre de Grace became known for duck hunting, and was a seasonal destination for hunters. They stayed at the town hotels and hired local guides to escort them hunting on the river and along the bay. Local artisans became known for making high quality decoys, which they carved and painted. Prime examples are displayed today at the Decoy Museum of the city.

By the 1860s, a large population of free African Americans had settled in the town. It had enough business to support independent artisans, and numerous jobs associated with shipping on the river and canal and, increasingly, with the railroads. During the American Civil War, this town was one of seven sites where the Army recruited for volunteers for the U.S. Colored Troops, composed of African-American men. Although located in the tidewater area of Harford County, which still had large plantations and slaveholders, the city's river and canals tied it to northern industry and trade in Pennsylvania and beyond. These provided urban jobs for free blacks, and the town had a strong proportion of Northern sympathizers among whites.

=== S. J. Seneca ===
In 1878, the town became a city and established its own government. Shortly after 1878, Stephen J. Seneca opened a fruit-packing factory in the S. J. Seneca Warehouse, with a tin can factory next to Havre de Grace Waterfront. Seneca made improvements to canning with his patents, such as the "Can-soldering machines" of 1889, and 1891.

The first railroad was constructed along St. Clair Street (now Pennington Ave.) to the river, so Seneca's factory was well-positioned for both water and rail shipping. Farmers in Harford County brought their produce to the Seneca Factory (later operated as Stockham's Cannery) until the time of the Second World War. Seneca served as Mayor of Havre de Grace from 1893 to 1894, and by 1899 he had become a broker of canned goods. In addition to his businesses, Seneca had a home at 200 North Union Avenue and donated funds and land to build the Methodist Church.

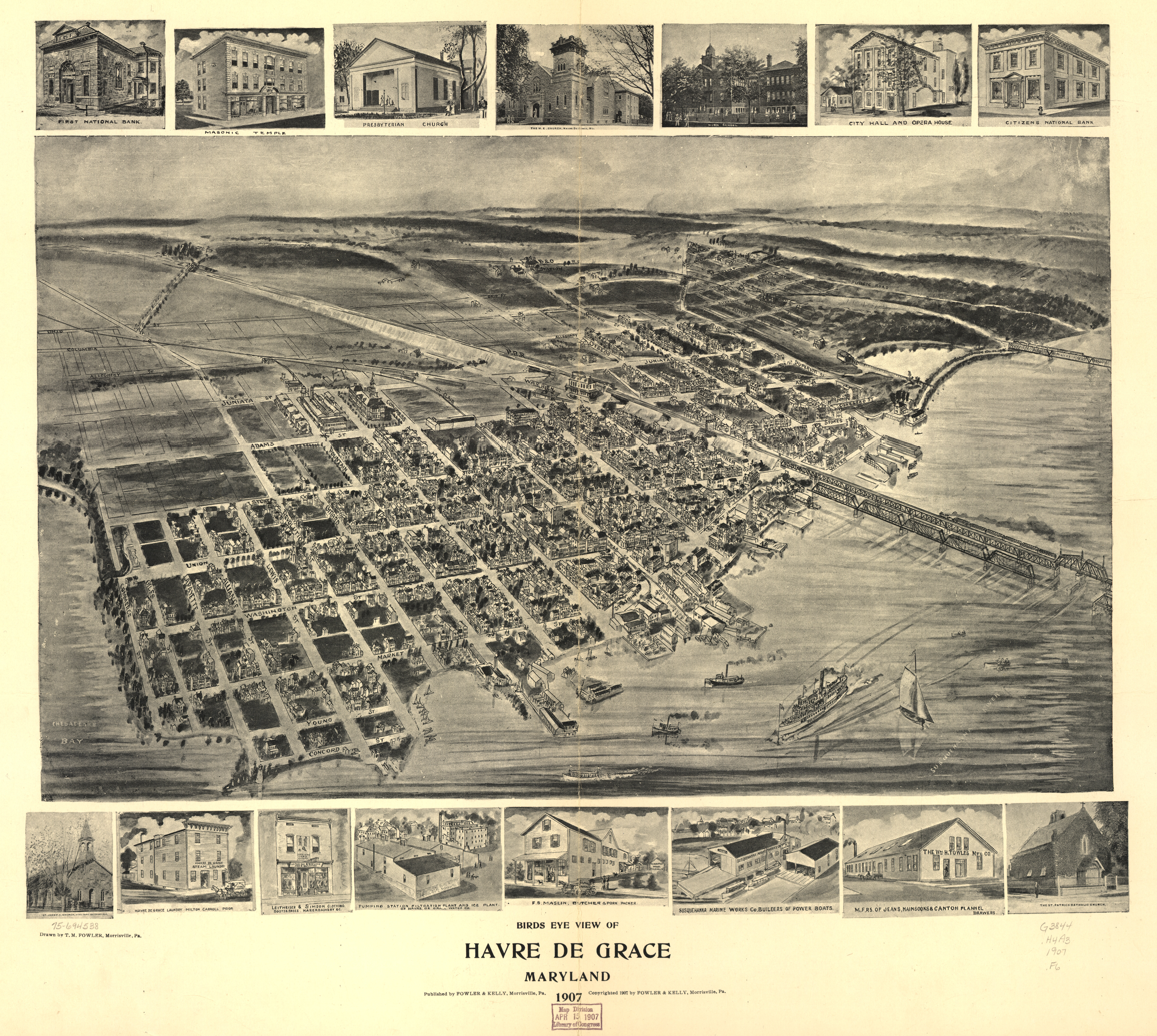
Aerial view of Havre de Grace, 1907

Seneca continued to acquire patents after the turn of the century, including:

- The Baling-press (1901).
- The Cooker (1905).
- The Tomato-scalder (1905).
- Improved Tomato-scalder (1917).
- The Can-opener (1917).
- The Machine for peeling tomatoes (1918).

The Seneca cannery, now used as an antique shop, is a late 19th-century brick industrial building with a classical façade and stone buttresses at the rear.

=== 20th century ===
Havre de Grace was known as "The Graw" from 1912, through the 1950s. It prospered as a stop for north–south travelers. These included gangsters and gamblers en route to New York City from the South following the "pony routes". The Havre de Grace Racetrack operated from 1912 to 1950. Chicago gangster Al Capone was reported to have stayed at the former "Chesapeake Hotel" (now known as "The Vintage Cafe"). At the end of the 1950s, the state removed the horse track. Its race and betting rights were bought by the larger Pimlico Race Course in Baltimore.

In 1949, the city denied a license to use a city park to a Jehovah's Witnesses preacher; when he spoke in the park anyway, he was arrested. The resulting case reached the US Supreme Court; in Niemotko v. Maryland (1951), the court ruled that Jehovah's Witnesses were protected by constitutional rights to the free exercise of religion, and the city should have granted them the permit to speak in the park.

A few tenant farmhouses remain from the large Mitchel plantation that overlooked the city.

In the 1980s, Havre de Grace began to undergo extensive redevelopment as people were attracted to its unique character. Historic properties were renovated and sometimes adapted for new uses. In addition, former farmland was redeveloped for construction of new houses and, later, townhouse communities. Since the late 20th century, the city has benefited through development of new properties, antique stores, and other retail venues. Havre de Grace became a popular location for vacation homes on the bay and retirees. Historic farms and forests have been cleared as upscale home development extends along Chapel Road northwest toward Webster Village.

Per capita income doubled in the city from 1990 to 2000, with the arrival of wealthier residents to the newer suburban projects around and in the city. Some commute to jobs elsewhere; others are retirees. New suburban developments since the 1990s brought thousands of middle-to-upper-class residents to the town. Many working-class citizens who used to live in the city have been displaced by rising property values and gentrification.

=== 21st century ===
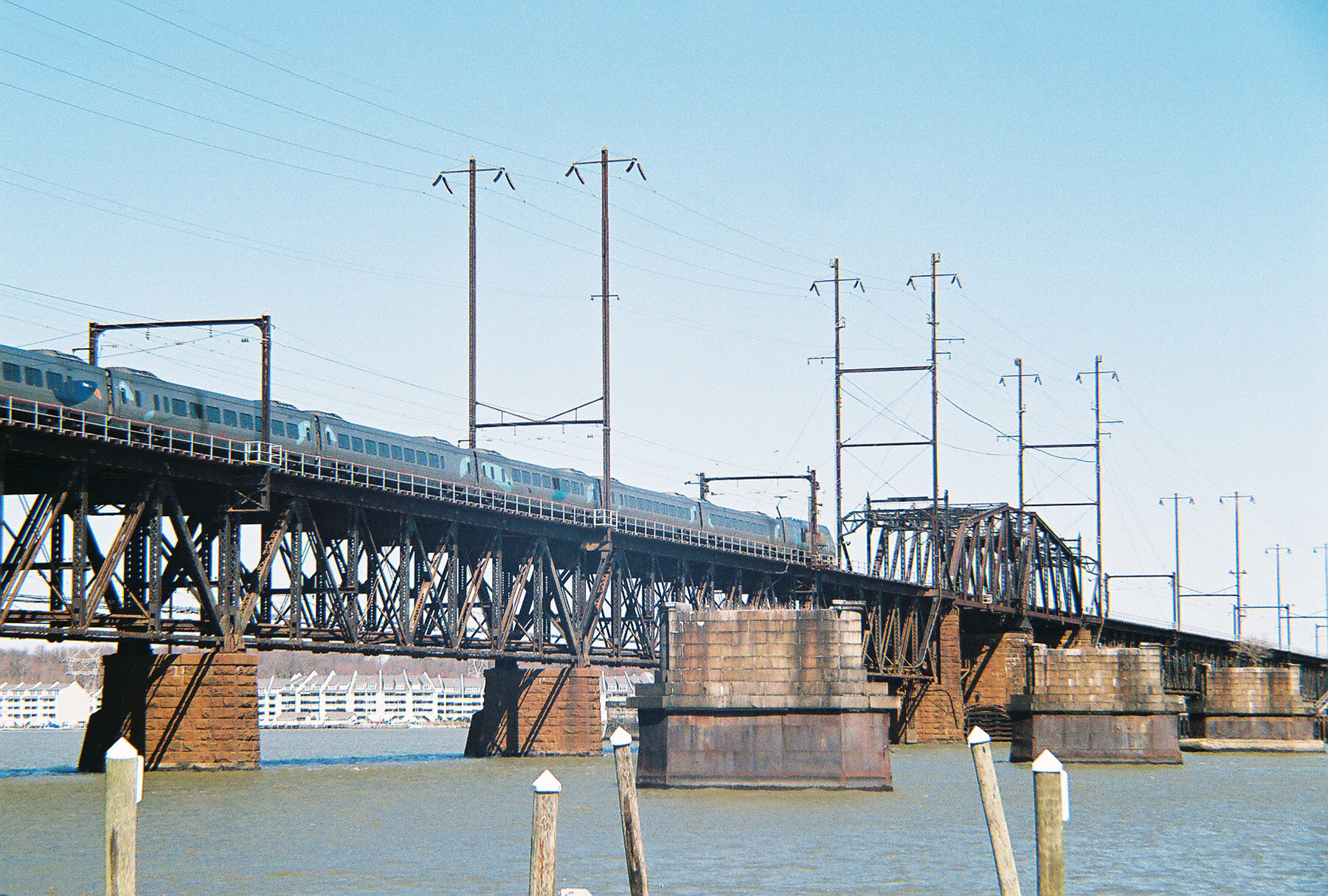
Northbound Acela Express crossing Amtrak Susquehanna River Bridge at Havre de Grace

In September 2003, Hurricane Isabel flooded the city about two blocks into downtown, destroying the promenade. It was rebuilt in 2004, with help from Americorps NCCC. Today, it serves as a waterfront boardwalk and nature walk from Tydings Park to the Maritime Museum, and on to Concord Point Lighthouse.

Havre de Grace expanded in the early 21st century by annexing land. Housing development is moderate but steady.

Havre de Grace has been affected by the BRAC activities of the Department of Defense (DOD). DOD moved activities and personnel from various bases to the Aberdeen Proving Ground (APG), a few miles away, which has added to the demand for housing and services.

== Geography ==
Havre de Grace is located at 39°32′54″N 76°5′51″W (39.548412, −76.097554) at the mouth of the Susquehanna River.

According to the U.S. Census Bureau, the city has a total area of 6.89 square miles (17.85 km^{2}), of which 5.50 square miles (14.24 km^{2}) is land and 1.39 square miles (3.60 km^{2}) is water.

Havre de Grace is 40 miles (64 km) northeast of Baltimore, 40 miles (64 km) west of Wilmington, Delaware, 68 miles (109 km) southwest of Philadelphia, 75 miles (121 km) northeast of Washington, D.C., and 154 miles (248 km) southwest of New York City.

=== Climate ===
The climate in this area is characterized by hot, humid summers and generally mild to cool winters. According to the Köppen Climate Classification system, Havre de Grace has a humid subtropical climate, abbreviated "Cfa" on climate maps.

== Demographics ==
Historical population
Census	Pop.	Note	%±
1850	1,335		—
1860	1,963		47.0%
1870	2,281		16.2%
1880	2,816		23.5%
1890	3,244		15.2%
1900	3,423		5.5%
1910	4,212		23.0%
1920	4,377		3.9%
1930	3,985		−9.0%
1940	4,967		24.6%
1950	7,809		57.2%
1960	8,510		9.0%
1970	9,791		15.1%
1980	8,763		−10.5%
1990	8,952		2.2%
2000	11,331		26.6%
2010	12,952		14.3%
2020	14,807		14.3%
U.S. Decennial Census

=== 2020 census ===
As of the 2020 census, Havre de Grace had a population of 14,807. The median age was 46.0 years. 19.2% of residents were under the age of 18 and 21.0% of residents were 65 years of age or older. For every 100 females there were 90.5 males, and for every 100 females age 18 and over there were 88.9 males age 18 and over.

98.7% of residents lived in urban areas, while 1.3% lived in rural areas.

There were 6,169 households in Havre de Grace, of which 27.0% had children under the age of 18 living in them. Of all households, 47.0% were married-couple households, 17.8% were households with a male householder and no spouse or partner present, and 28.0% were households with a female householder and no spouse or partner present. About 30.1% of all households were made up of individuals and 13.2% had someone living alone who was 65 years of age or older.

There were 6,653 housing units, of which 7.3% were vacant. The homeowner vacancy rate was 1.8% and the rental vacancy rate was 5.8%.

Racial composition as of the 2020 census
Race	Number	Percent
White	10,283	69.4%
Black or African American	2,564	17.3%
American Indian and Alaska Native	52	0.4%
Asian	434	2.9%
Native Hawaiian and Other Pacific Islander	14	0.1%
Some other race	318	2.1%
Two or more races	1,142	7.7%
Hispanic or Latino (of any race)	879	5.9%

=== 2010 census ===
As of the 2010 U.S. census, there were 12,952 people, 5,258 households, and 3,333 families residing in the city. The population density was 2,354.9 inhabitants per square mile (909.2/km^{2}). There were 5,875 housing units at an average density of 1,068.2 per square mile (412.4/km^{2}). The racial makeup of the city was 75.7% White, 16.8% African American, 0.3% Native American, 2.4% Asian, 0.1% Pacific Islander, 1.1% from other races, and 3.7% from two or more races. Hispanic or Latino of any race were 4.7% of the population.

There were 5,258 households, of which 30.3% had children under the age of 18 living with them, 46.6% were married couples living together, 12.7% had a female householder with no husband present, 4.1% had a male householder with no wife present, and 36.6% were non-families. 29.7% of all households were made up of individuals, and 10.3% had someone living alone who was 65 years of age or older. The average household size was 2.42 and the average family size was 3.02.

The median age in the city was 41.9 years. 21.9% of residents were under the age of 18; 7.6% were between the ages of 18 and 24; 25.1% were from 25 to 44; 31.4% were from 45 to 64; and 13.9% were 65 years of age or older. The gender makeup of the city was 48.4% male and 51.6% female.

=== 2000 census ===
As of the 2000 U.S. census, there were 11,331 people, 4,557 households, and 2,870 families residing in the city. The population density was 2,815.1 inhabitants per square mile (1,086.9/km^{2}). There were 4,904 housing units at an average density of 1,218.4 per square mile (470.4/km^{2}). The racial makeup of the city was 79.24% White, 16.15% African American, 0.22% Native American, 1.29% Asian, 0.11% Pacific Islander, 0.80% from other races, and 2.18% from two or more races. Hispanic or Latino of any race were 2.13% of the population.

There were 4,557 households, out of which 31.8% had children under the age of 18 living with them, 46.3% were married couples living together, 12.5% had a female householder with no husband present, and 37.0% were non-families. 31.1% of all households were made up of individuals, and 11.0% had someone living alone who was 65 years of age or older. The average household size was 2.44 and the average family size was 3.07. Over half (54%) of the housing units in the city are renter-occupied.

In the city, the population was spread, with 26.4% under the age of 18, 6.5% from 18 to 24, 32.5% from 25 to 44, 21.5% from 45 to 64, and 13.0% who were 65 years of age or older. The median age was 36 years. For every 100 females, there were 92.7 males. For every 100 females age 18 and over, there were 89.6 males.

The median income for a household in the city was $41,218, and the median income for a family was $53,838. Males had a median income of $37,985 versus $27,173 for females. The per capita income for the city was $21,176. About 7.5% of families and 14.4% of the population were below the poverty line, including 10.8% of those under age 18 and 9.8% of those age 65 or over.

== Transportation ==
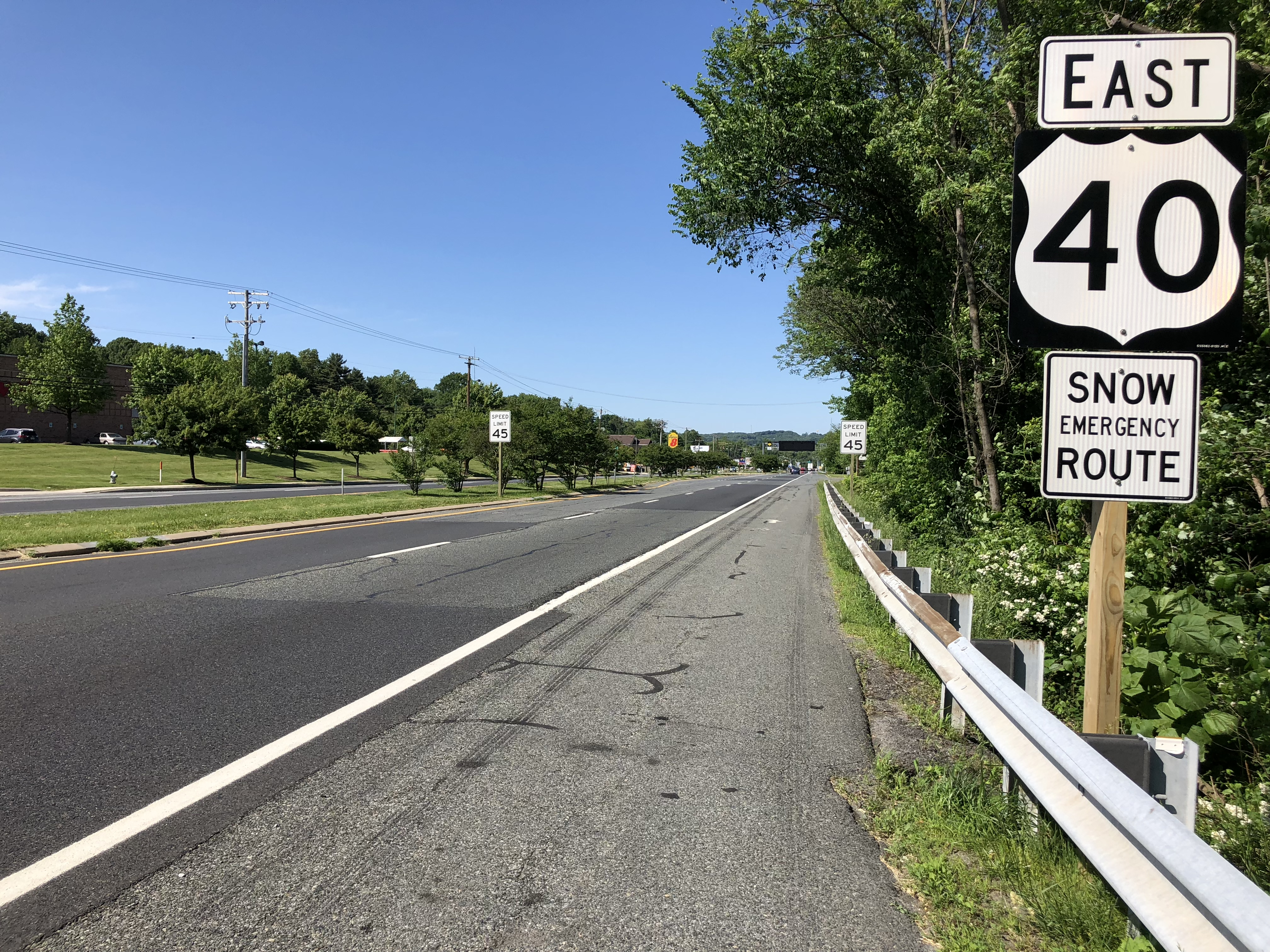
U.S. Route 40 eastbound in Havre de Grace

=== Roads and highways ===
The primary means of travel to and from Havre de Grace is by road. The most prominent highway through the city is U.S. Route 40, which runs east to Wilmington and west to Baltimore. US 40 also includes the Thomas J. Hatem Memorial Bridge, the road bridge that crosses the Susquehanna River directly from the city. Many travelers reach Havre de Grace via Maryland Route 155, which connects to nearby Interstate 95. State highways serving the city include Route 7, Route 490, and Route 763.

=== Railroads ===
Two railroad mainlines pass through Havre de Grace. More than 80 daily passenger trains on Amtrak's busy Northeast Corridor speed through the city at 90 miles per hour (145 km/h) on an elevated line connected to the adjacent Amtrak Susquehanna River Bridge. The double-track bridge was built by the Pennsylvania Railroad between 1904 and 1906 for its New York City–Washington, D.C. line. (The bridge replaced a wooden single-track railroad bridge, completed in 1866 by the Philadelphia, Wilmington, and Baltimore Railroad, whose piers can still be seen from the city's David R. Craig Park.) The Philadelphia Subdivision of CSX Transportation, originally built by the Baltimore and Ohio Railroad, carries a heavy volume of freight across the river on the CSX Susquehanna River Bridge, rebuilt between 1907 and 1910, about 1 mile (1.6 km) upstream of the Amtrak bridge.

== Attractions ==
Havre de Grace's location at the head of the Chesapeake Bay and the mouth of the Susquehanna River makes it popular for recreation and tourism. There are marinas and service operators along the shore line. The city yacht basin and park sponsors various events each year. The restored promenade and boardwalk that runs along the shore from the Concord Point Lighthouse to the yacht basin is a favorite place for locals and tourists to walk and enjoy views of the bay.

In 1987, the central business district was added to the National Register of Historic Places as the Havre de Grace Historic District, which recognizes its architecture and historic fabric. A variety of museums help explain and interpret the city's rich maritime past and present: the Decoy Museum, the Havre de Grace Maritime Museum, Concord Point Lighthouse, the Lockhouse Museum, and the Black Eyed Susan paddle steamer. Havre de Grace also claims a renovated seaplane port. Additionally there resides the Washington Street Books Entertainment Museum. The city has four public schools, including Havre de Grace High School, and Harford Memorial Hospital, the first to be established in Harford County.

A project not completely funded (as of 2022) is the restoration of the Havre de Grace Colored School Museum and Cultural Center.

== Notable people ==
- Harriet Baker (1829–1913), evangelist
- Ed Bakey (1925–1988), actor
- Jerry Bowman (born 1962), racing driver
- Charles Bradley (born 1959), NBA player for the Boston Celtics and Seattle SuperSonics 1981–1984
- David R. Craig (born 1949), Harford County Executive, 2005–2014
- Barry Glassman (born 1962), Maryland Delegate, 1999–2014; County Executive, 2014–2022
- James M. Harkins (born 1953), Maryland Delegate, 1991–1998
- Brionna Jones (born 1995), WNBA player
- Susan Kolb (born 1954), medical doctor and author
- James Miller (1963–2002), parachutist and paraglider
- Ultra Naté (born 1968), house music singer, songwriter, and record producer
- Immanuel Quickley (born 1999), college basketball player for the University of Kentucky, 2019–2020 SEC Player of the Year, and professional basketball player for the Toronto Raptors
- Bill Ripken (born 1964), MLB player for the Baltimore Orioles, Texas Rangers, Cleveland Indians and Detroit Tigers
- Cal Ripken Jr. (born 1960), Major League Baseball player and Hall of Famer for the Orioles
- Frederick Rodgers (1842–1917), United States Navy rear admiral
- William Sleator (1945–2011), author of young adult science-fiction novels including House of Stairs and Interstellar Pig
- Millard Tydings (1890–1961), U.S. Senator 1927–1951
- Kim Waters (born 1965), musician
- Tobias Watkins (1780–1855), physician, editor, and writer

== Local media ==
- The Aegis, Bel Air
- The Sun, Baltimore
- WHGM - A classic hits radio station based in Havre de Grace
- WXCY-FM - A country music radio station based in Havre de Grace

== Town twins and sister cities ==
Havre de Grace has a sister-city relationship with Mumbles, Wales.

Havre de Grace also has a sister-city relationship with Sillamäe, Ida-Viru County, Estonia.

== In popular culture ==
A season-four episode of the television show Boardwalk Empire was named for the city and partially took place there.

The city stood in for Gaffney, South Carolina, Kevin Spacey's character Frank Underwood's hometown in House of Cards.

In July 2007, the movie From Within (2008) was filmed in Havre de Grace.

In 2018, stand-up comedian Tom Myers recorded his CD "Make America Innate Again" in the Black Box at the Cultural Arts Center. Additionally, the opening track is titled "Hello, Havre De Grace."

Since 2022, The State Theater on St. John Street has hosted many shows of Combat Zone Wrestling called “Limelight”.
