= Concord Point Light =

Lighthouse in Maryland, United States

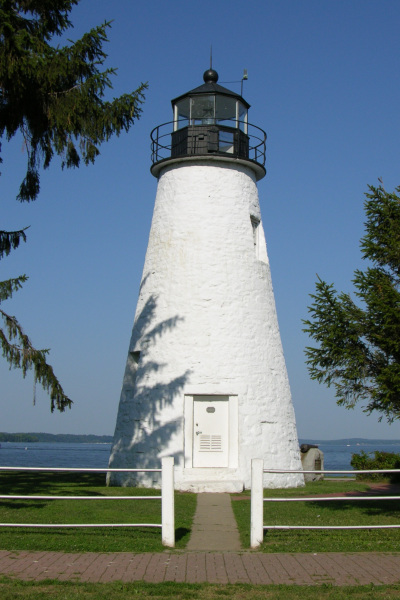
- Location: Concord and Lafayette Streets, Havre de Grace, Maryland, U.S.
- Coordinates: 39°32′27″N 76°05′05″W

Tower
- Constructed: 1827
- Construction: granite (tower)
- Automated: 1920
- Height: 36 ft (11 m)
- Shape: conical
- Markings: Whitewash
- Heritage: National Register of Historic Places listed place

Light
- First lit: 1827
- Deactivated: 1975-1983
- Focal height: 11.5 m (38 ft)
- Lens: fifth order Fresnel lens (1983–), sixth order Fresnel lens (1854–1975)
- Characteristic: F W
- Havre de Grace Lighthouse
- U.S. National Register of Historic Places
- Area: 0.1 acres (0.040 ha)
- Architect: John Donohoo
- NRHP reference No.: 76000999
- Added to NRHP: April 2, 1976

Concord Point Light is a 36-foot (11 m) lighthouse in Havre de Grace, Maryland. It overlooks the point where Susquehanna River flows into the Chesapeake Bay, an area of increasing navigational traffic when it was constructed in 1827. It is the northernmost lighthouse and the second-oldest tower lighthouse still standing on the bay.

Concord Point Light is currently listed as a private aid to navigation.

== Description ==
Concord Point Light is among the many Maryland lighthouses built by John Donahoo, who also built its keeper's house across the street. The tower is constructed of Port Deposit granite. The walls are 31 inches (790 mm) thick at the base and narrow to 18 inches (460 mm) at the parapet.

The lantern was originally lit with nine whale oil lamps with 16-inch (410 mm) tin reflectors. In 1854, a sixth-order Fresnel lens was installed. This was later upgraded to a fifth-order Fresnel lens.

The lighthouse was automated in 1920.

== History ==
Among the lighthouse's keepers from 1827 to the mid-1900s were several members of the O'Neill family. The first O'Neill, John O'Neill had defended the town of Havre de Grace by manning a cannon battery on Concord Point during the War of 1812.

By 1924, local documents describe the lighthouse area as being "seriously blighted"; it apparently remained that way for many years.

The lighthouse was decommissioned by the Coast Guard in 1975; soon after that, the lens was stolen. The structure was added to the National Register of Historic Places in 1976. Extensive restoration work began in 1979. The keeper's house has since been restored and is open to the public as a museum.

In 1983, a fifth-order Fresnel lens borrowed from the Coast Guard was installed in the lantern room.

== See also ==
- National Register of Historic Places listings in Harford County, Maryland
- Lighthouses in Maryland
- Lighthouses in the United States
