= CSX Susquehanna River Bridge =

Bridge in Maryland, United States

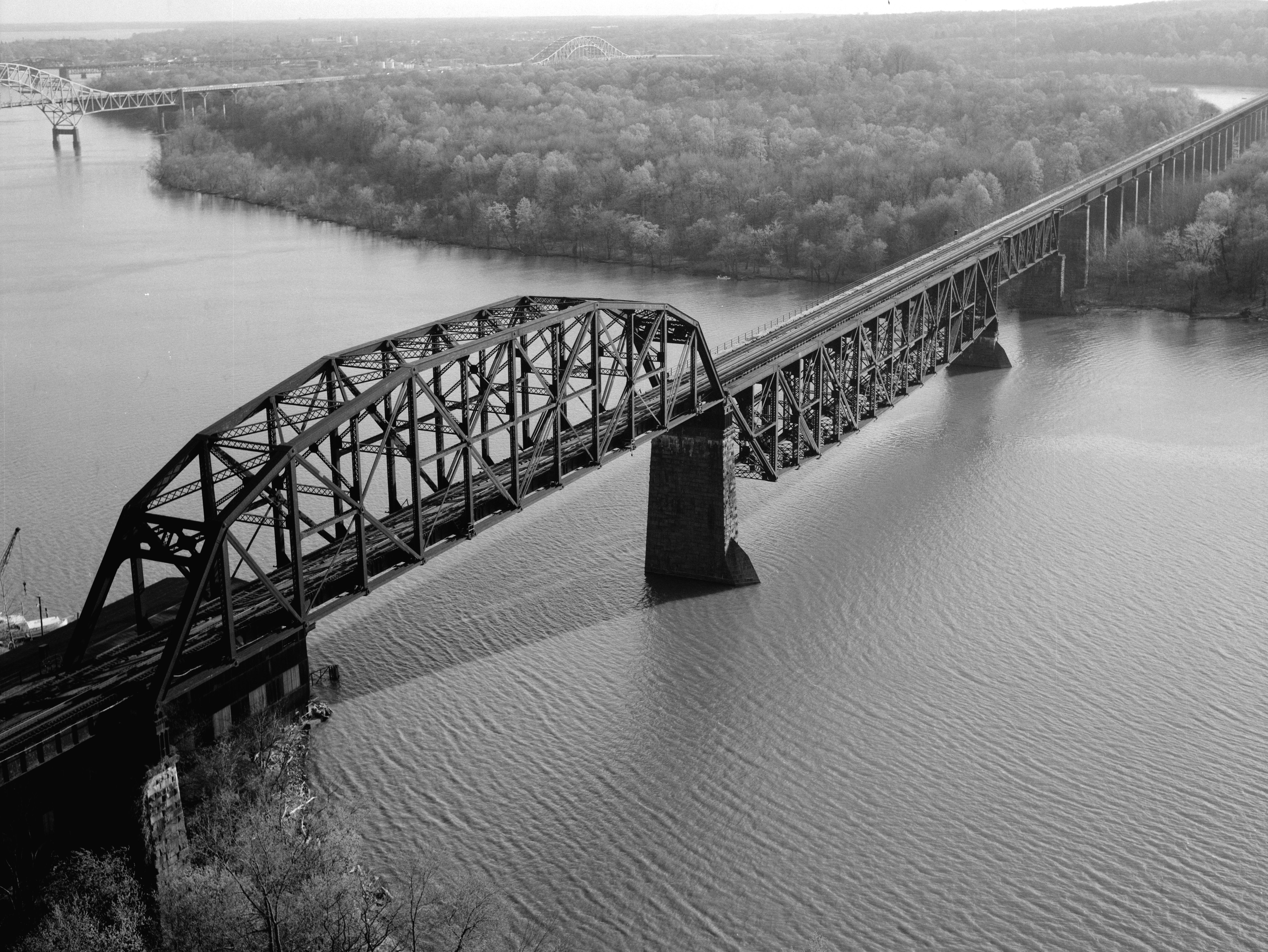
- Susquehanna River Bridge circa 1978
- Coordinates: 39.56884°N 76.0870°W
- Carries: CSX Philadelphia Subdivision (1 track)
- Crosses: Susquehanna River
- Locale: Havre de Grace, Maryland and Perryville, Maryland
- Owner: CSX Transportation

Characteristics
- Design: Through truss and deck truss
- Material: Steel
- Total length: 6,109 feet (1,862 m)
- Longest span: 520 feet (160 m)
- Clearance below: 85 feet (26 m)

History
- Constructed by: American Bridge Company
- Opened: January 6, 1910

The CSX Susquehanna River Bridge is a railroad bridge that carries CSX's Philadelphia Subdivision across the Susquehanna River between Havre de Grace and Perryville, Maryland, via Garrett Island. It was built in 1907–1910 by the Baltimore and Ohio Railroad (B&O) on the same alignment as an 1886 B&O bridge. Like its predecessor, it was the longest continuous bridge on the B&O system.

== History ==
=== 1866–1884: PW&B Bridge ===
The 1866 completion of the nearby Philadelphia, Wilmington, and Baltimore (PW&B) railroad bridge allowed trains between Baltimore and Philadelphia to cross the Susquehanna without the aid of a ferryboat for the first time. The B&O used trackage rights on the PW&B to operate trains to Philadelphia and Jersey City starting at about this time. In this way, the B&O was able to expand its service territory with minimal capital expenditure.

In 1869, the B&O began advertising this route as the "New York and Washington Air Line Railway." Although the PW&B was an independent company at the time, the use of key sections of track in Philadelphia and New Jersey depended upon the cooperation of the Pennsylvania Railroad (PRR). When the B&O's president John W. Garrett was outbid by the PRR for control of the PW&B in early 1881, Garrett realized that B&O's Philadelphia and New York connections were in jeopardy. B&O began planning immediately for its own line between Baltimore and Philadelphia, where a connection to the friendly Reading Railroad would provide access to the New York area.

B&O passenger trains continued crossing the river on the PW&B until the trackage rights agreement expired on October 12, 1884.

=== 1884–1907: First B&O Bridge ===
B&O's new line, the Baltimore and Philadelphia Railroad, was built to higher engineering standards than typical on its system, despite the company's shaky finances. At the Susquehanna, the B&O resolved to create a bridge that was superior to the PW&B bridge it formerly used. As Garrett wrote in an 1884 report:

It...will be one of the largest and most remarkable structures of its class in the world. It is the determination of the company that it shall be of the most substantial, safe and durable character. It will be 6,346 feet [1,934 m] in length, 94 feet [29 m] above low mean tide, and will rest on eleven granite piers, having their foundations on the bed-rock of the river... The foundations for six of the piers have been difficult, reaching, as they do, a depth of 85 feet [26 m] below low water, and necessitating the use of caissons, with air chambers, in which the men, engaged in removing the debris in order to reach bed-rock, have worked under a pressure of 37 pounds per square inch [260 kPa].

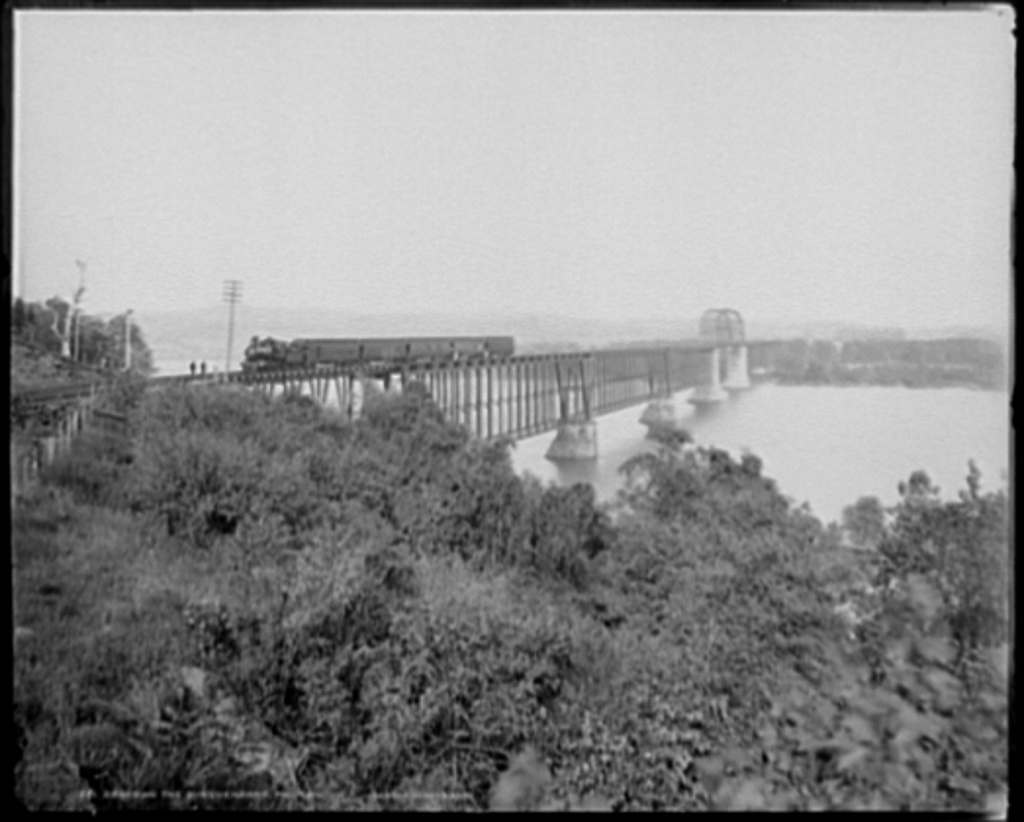
Western end (from Havre de Grace)

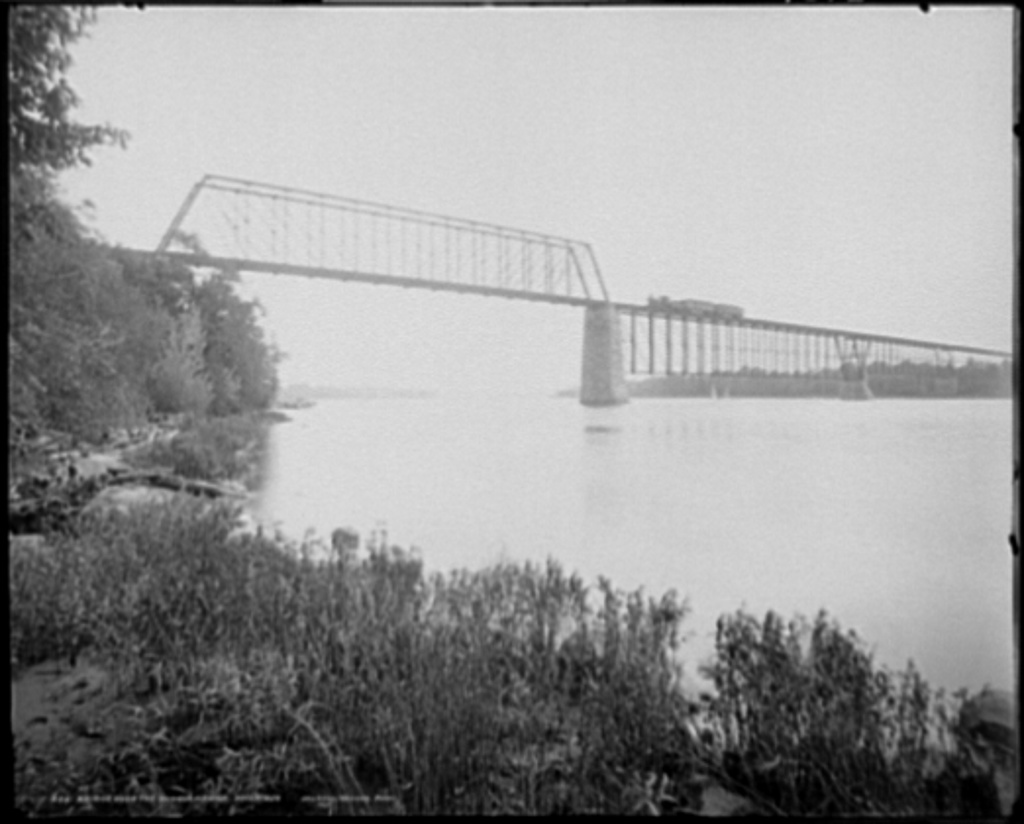
Eastern end (from Perryville)

1886 B&O Susquehanna Bridge

The bridge consisted of the following segments: a 212-foot (65 m) western approach viaduct, four 480-foot (150 m) Whipple deck truss spans, a 520-foot (160 m) through truss span over the western navigation channel, a 200-foot (61 m) deck truss span, a 1,942-foot (592 m) viaduct over Garrett Island, one 380-foot (120 m) and one 520-foot (160 m) Whipple deck truss spans, a 380-foot (120 m) through truss span over the eastern navigation channel, and finally a 242-foot (74 m) eastern approach viaduct. The eastern approach also crossed the PRR's Columbia and Port Deposit Railroad. Unlike the remainder of the Philadelphia line, the bridge contained only a single track. (Note: The lengths of the three spans on the eastern side of the river are surmised from the 1914 B&O truss bridge report. The Baltimore Sun article of May 10, 1886, quoted by McCrain says the through truss section is 520 feet. The B&O report assigns this length to one of the deck truss sections instead.)

The bridge cost $1.7 million to construct. It was opened with a ceremonial train on May 11, 1886. Freight operations began on May 25 of that year; passenger operations followed on August 23. The first Washington to New York train to use the new route crossed on December 15. Starting in 1890, passenger trains that used the bridge were marketed under the name Royal Blue Line.

=== 1908–present: Second B&O Bridge ===
In the early years of the 20th century, the iron bridges on the Philadelphia line could no longer handle the latest locomotive designs at optimal speeds. The Susquehanna Bridge also required an additional track. In November 1907, the American Bridge Company and Eyre-Shoemaker Company began renovating the structure. Timber falsework was used to shore up sections of the bridge under construction, allowing construction to proceed with minimal disruption to traffic.

On September 23, 1908, a coal car derailed on the bridge and struck a mobile crane. The crane collapsed, bringing down the eastern channel through truss, which sank in deep water. One person was injured and 12 cars at the end of the train were lost.

The PRR granted the B&O the right to detour trains over its new double-track bridge, and so track connections between the B&O and PRR were built at Swan Creek (west of Havre de Grace) and Aiken (near Perryville). At Aiken, the steep grade between the two lines required the use of helpers. This detour was maintained while the renovations to the Susquehanna Bridge were completed.

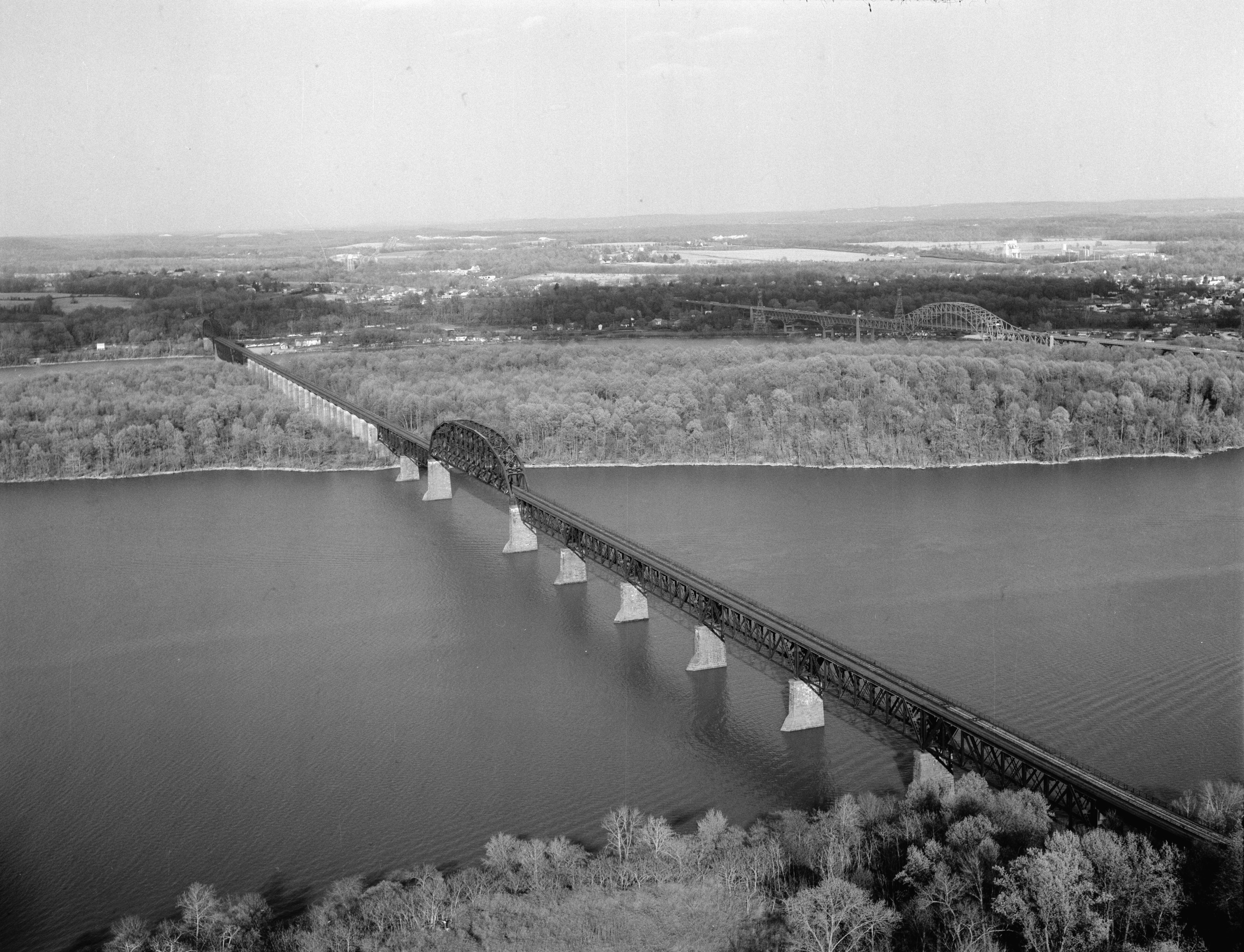
Western end (from Havre de Grace)

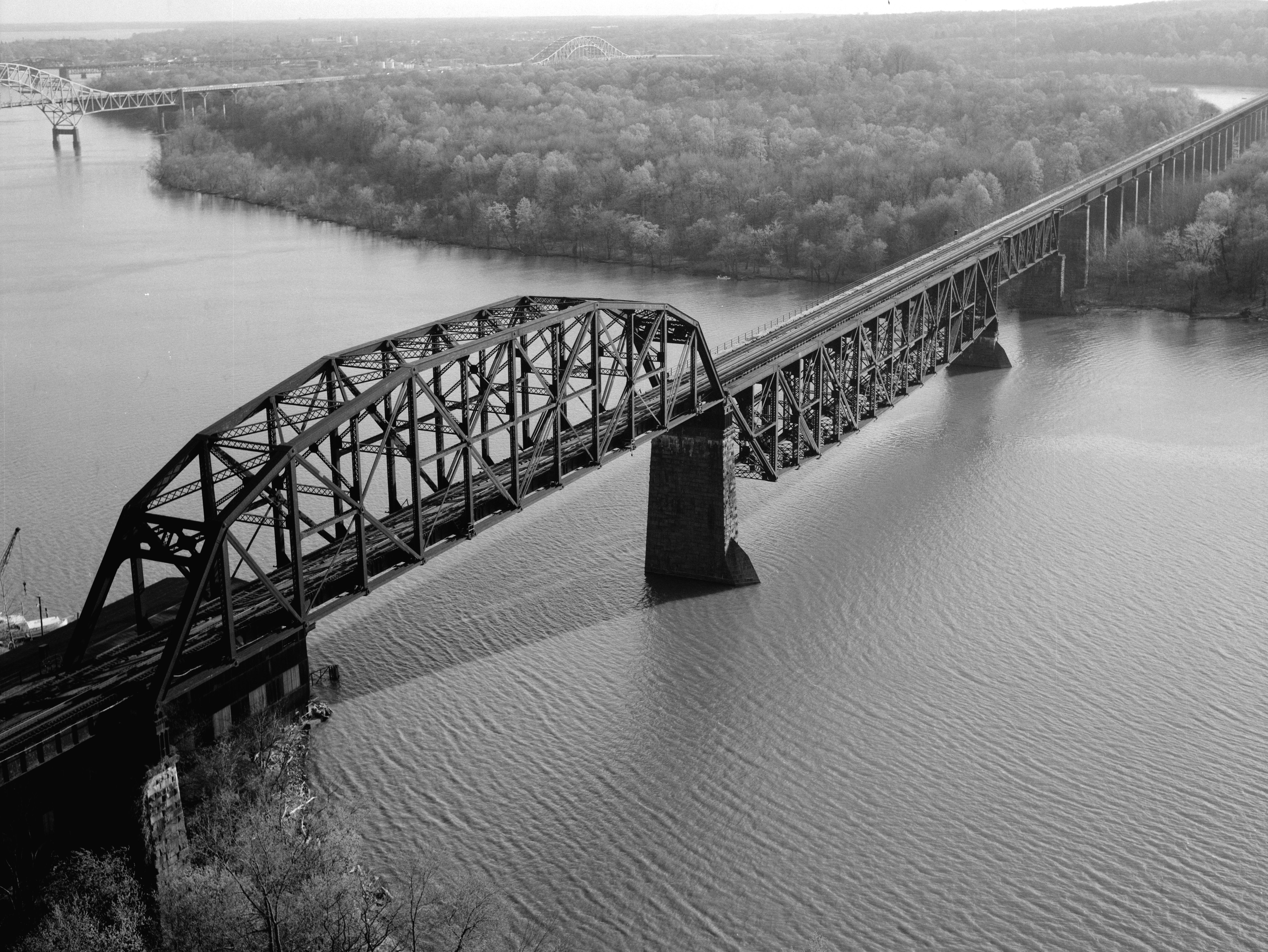
Eastern end (from Perryville)

1908 B&O Susquehanna Bridge

Compared to the original bridge, the new bridge has shorter and more numerous deck truss spans. The superstructure is constructed of 16,000 short tons (15,000 t) of steel and can support two tracks. Pennsylvania through truss spans are used over both navigation channels. 30 new piers were built; 10 were widened and remodeled. Three of the new piers were sunk in the west channel using the caisson process.

The renovations cost more than $2 million. The new bridge opened for traffic on January 6, 1910.

Passenger service east of Baltimore ended on April 26, 1958. By 1960, the entire Philadelphia line including the Susquehanna Bridge was single-tracked. Ownership of the bridge later passed to the Chessie System and CSX along with other B&O assets.

== Present status ==
As of 2006, CSX runs about 24 trains daily on the Philadelphia Subdivision, including intermodal, autorack, and general merchandise freights.

== See also ==
- List of bridges documented by the Historic American Engineering Record in Maryland
