= List of crossings of the Susquehanna River =

List of Susquehanna River crossings proceeding upstream from the river mouth at the Chesapeake Bay in Maryland, United States, generally northward through Pennsylvania toward the main branch headwaters in New York. The West Branch crossings are listed afterward.

This list includes active road, railroad, foot, and trail bridges, dams, fords, ferries, and historic crossings. Presently it does not include historic ferry crossings. Railroad lines are generally as shown on the USGS topographic maps, which may not have been updated to reflect the creation of Conrail in the 1970s, which absorbed many lines in this area.

== Main Branch ==
Main Branch crossings are listed from the mouth of the river in the Chesapeake Bay up to the source at Otsego Lake in Cooperstown, New York.

In a geological sense, the Chesapeake Bay is just the ria, submerged valley, of the Susquehanna River. In that sense the Chesapeake Bay Bridge Tunnel and the Chesapeake Bay Bridge crossings precede those in the conventional list below.

=== Maryland ===
| Bridge | Route | Location | Notes | Coordinates | Image |
|---|---|---|---|---|---|
| P.W. & B. Railroad Bridge (ruins) | later vehicular for MD 7 | Havre de Grace and Perryville | | 39°33′17″N 76°05′01″W | |
| Amtrak Susquehanna River Bridge | Amtrak Northeast Corridor | Havre de Grace and Perryville | | 39°33′17″N 76°05′04″W | |
| Thomas J. Hatem Memorial Bridge | US 40 | Havre de Grace and Perryville via Garrett I. | | 39°33′38″N 76°05′23″W | |
| CSX Susquehanna River Bridge | CSX Philadelphia Subdivision | Havre de Grace and Perryville via Garrett I. | | 39°34′04″N 76°05′26″W | |
| Millard E. Tydings Memorial Bridge | I-95 | Havre de Grace and Perryville | | 39°34′52″N 76°06′14″W | |
| Port Deposit Bridge (ruin) also called Susquehanna River Bridge, Rock Run Bridge | | Harford County and Port Deposit via Roberts I. | Historic first fixed crossing (1817–1857) | 39°36′51″N 76°08′06″W | |
| Conowingo Dam | US 1 | Harford County and Cecil County | | 39°39′45″N 76°10′21″W | |
| Conowingo Bridge (demolished and submerged 1928) | US 1 | Harford County and old Conowingo | Replaced by Conowingo Dam crossing | 39°40′47″N 76°12′09″W | |

=== Pennsylvania ===
==== York County – Lancaster County ====
| Bridge | Route | Location | Coordinates | Image |
|---|---|---|---|---|
| Norman Wood Bridge | PA 372 | York County and Lancaster County | 39°49′00″N 76°19′26″W | |
| Holtwood Dam | No public thoroughfare | York County and Lancaster County | 39°49′36″N 76°20′10″W | |
| York Furnace Bridge (demolished) | | York County and Lancaster County | | Blown over by windstorm in 1855 and completely destroyed by an ice jam in 1857. The bridge was never completed or fully built. |
| Safe Harbor Dam | No public thoroughfare | York County and Lancaster County | 39°55′13″N 76°23′33″W | |
| Columbia-Wrightsville Bridge | PA 462 | Wrightsville and Columbia | 40°01′41″N 76°31′05″W | |
| Pennsylvania Railroad Bridge (demolished) | | Wrightsville and Columbia | 40°01′42″N 76°31′14″W | |
| Wrightsville Dam | (low head, former canal feeder) | Wrightsville and Columbia | 40°01′57″N 76°31′13″W | |
| Wright's Ferry Bridge | US 30 | Wrightsville and Columbia | 40°02′09″N 76°31′20″W | |
| Shocks Mills Bridge (railroad) | Norfolk Southern | Wago Junction and Marietta | 40°03′39″N 76°38′16″W | |

==== Dauphin, York, and Lancaster Counties ====
| Bridge | Route | Location | Notes | Coordinates | Image |
| York Haven Dam | no public thoroughfare | York Haven and Three Mile Island Nuclear Generating Station | | 40°07′22″N 76°43′13″W | |
| Three Mile Island access bridge | no public thoroughfare | Falmouth and Three Mile Island | | 40°07′57″N 76°42′56″W | |
| Three Mile Island low-head dam | No public thoroughfare | Londonderry Township and Three Mile Island | | 40°08′37″N 76°43′17″W | |
| Three Mile Island access bridge | No public thoroughfare | Londonderry Township and Three Mile Island | | 40°09′42″N 76°43′12″W | |

==== Dauphin County – York County ====
| Bridge | Route | Location | Notes | Coordinates | Image |
|---|---|---|---|---|---|
| Susquehanna River Bridge | I-76 Toll / Penna Turnpike | York County and Dauphin County | New 6-lane bridge completed in May 2007, replacing the old 4-lane bridge dated back to 1950. | 40°12′15″N 76°48′18″W | |

==== Dauphin County – Cumberland County (Harrisburg area) ====
| Bridge | Route | Location | Notes | Coordinates | Image |
|---|---|---|---|---|---|
| John Harris Bridge | I-83 | Cumberland County and Harrisburg | | 40°14′54″N 76°52′38″W | |
| Dock Street Dam | no public thoroughfare | Cumberland County and Harrisburg | replacement may be planning under way. | 40°14′55″N 76°52′43″W | |
| Philadelphia & Reading Railroad Bridge | Norfolk Southern | Cumberland County and Harrisburg | | 40°15′01″N 76°52′43″W | |
| South Pennsylvania Railroad Bridge (ruins) | | Cumberland County and Harrisburg | Construction was halted in 1885 and bridge was never finished. | 40°15′04″N 76°52′53″W | |
| Cumberland Valley Railroad Bridge | CorridorOne | Wormleysburg and Downtown Harrisburg via City Island | | 40°15′13″N 76°53′02″W | |
| Camelback Bridge | | Wormleysburg and Downtown Harrisburg via City Island | old covered bridge dating back to 1814, destroyed and replaced | 40°15′18″N 76°53′11″W | |
| Market Street Bridge | | Wormleysburg and Downtown Harrisburg via City Island | | 40°15′18″N 76°53′11″W | |
| Walnut Street Bridge | | Wormleysburg and Downtown Harrisburg via City Island | 3 spans collapsed in 1996 west of City Island | 40°15′24″N 76°53′14″W | |
| M. Harvey Taylor Memorial Bridge | | Wormleysburg and Downtown Harrisburg | | 40°15′44″N 76°53′55″W | |
| George N. Wade Memorial Bridge | I-81 | East Pennsboro Township and Harrisburg | | 40°18′51″N 76°54′34″W | |

==== Dauphin County – Perry County ====
| Bridge | Route | Location | Notes | Coordinates | Image |
|---|---|---|---|---|---|
| Rockville Bridge | Amtrak; Norfolk Southern | Marysville and Harrisburg | | 40°20′02″N 76°54′34″W | |
| Old Rockville Bridge (ruins) | Pennsylvania Rail Road | Marysville and Harrisburg | deck truss bridge dating to 1877, removed. | 40°20′02″N 76°54′39″W | |
| Marysville Bridge (ruins) | Northern Central Railway | Marysville and Dauphin | A replica of the Statue of Liberty is standing on one stone pier. | 40°21′30″N 76°55′46″W | |
| Clarks Ferry or Green's Dam | | Perry County and Dauphin County | (former canal feeder) | 40°23′58″N 77°00′59″W | |
| Clarks Ferry Bridge | US 22; US 322; Appalachian Trail | Dauphin County | | 40°23′58″N 77°00′32″W | |
| Millersburg Ferry wall | No public thoroughfare | Buffalo Township and Millersburg | crooked dam, for low water ferry operations | 40°32′27″N 76°58′26″W | |
| Millersburg Ferry | | Buffalo Township and Millersburg | operates seasonally | 40°32′30″N 76°58′25″W | |

==== Snyder County – Northumberland County ====
| Bridge | Route | Location | Notes | Coordinates | Image |
|---|---|---|---|---|---|
| Trevorton Bridge | | Port Trevorton and Herndon via White I. | 1855, Trevorton, Mahanoy & Susquehanna Railroad and road, dismantled 1870 see USGS Aerial imagery | 40°42′35″N 76°51′10″W | |
| ford | | Little Hoover I. and Lower Augusta Township near Boile Run | connects I. to eastern shore | 40°45′34″N 76°50′34″W | |
| Selinsgrove Bridge | Norfolk Southern Railroad | Selinsgrove and Selinsgrove Junction via Cherry and Fishers Is. | two separate steel truss bridges, built 1890 and 1892, with Fishers Island in between | 40°48′04″N 76°50′42″W | |
| Shamokin Power Plant dam (New Shamokin Dam) | No public thoroughfare | Shamokin Dam and Upper Augusta Township via Byers I. | low head dam for plant | 40°49′58″N 76°49′09″W | |
| Adam T. Bower Memorial Dam | No public thoroughfare | Shamokin Dam and Sunbury | inflatable dam | 40°51′00″N 76°48′28″W | |
| Shamokin Dam | | Shamokin Dam and Sunbury | (original low head navigation and canal feeder) (18??-1904, replaced by Bower Dam) | 40°51′00″N 76°48′28″W | |
| Veterans Memorial Bridge | PA 61; PA 147 | Shamokin Dam and Sunbury | | 40°51′05″N 76°48′25″W | |

==== Northumberland, Montour, and Columbia Counties ====
| Bridge | Route | Location | Notes | Coordinates | Image |
|---|---|---|---|---|---|
| Packers Island bridges | Penn Central Railroad | Northumberland and Sunbury via Packers I. | span on either side of I. | 40°52′57″N 76°47′23″W | |
| Bridge Avenue bridge | PA 405 | Northumberland and Sunbury via Packers I. | span on either side of I. | 40°53′01″N 76°47′16″W | |
| Factory Street Bridge | PA 54 | Danville and Riverside | opened in 2000 | 40°57′28″N 76°37′20″W | |
| Mill Street Bridge(removed) | former PA 54 | Danville and Riverside | replaced in 2000 | 40°57′27″N 76°37′17″W | |
| Main Street Bridge | PA 42 | Rupert and Catawissa | | 40°57′15″N 76°28′05″W | |
| Railroad bridge | Conrail | Rupert and Catawissa | | 40°58′18″N 76°28′03″W | |
| Pennsylvania Route 487 bridge | PA 487 | Bloomsburg and Catawissa Township | Current structure replaced a multiple span truss bridge | 40°59′33″N 76°26′21″W | |
| Interstate 80 bridges | I-80 | Lime Ridge and Mifflinville | | 41°01′42″N 76°19′33″W | |
| Market Street Bridge (Mifflinville) | | Willow Springs and Mifflinville | Current structure replaced a multiple span truss bridge in the mid-1990s | 41°02′07″N 76°18′41″W | |
| Market Street Bridge (Berwick) | PA 93 | Berwick and Nescopeck | Current structure replaced a multiple span truss bridge in 1981–82 | 41°03′08″N 76°13′53″W | |
| Chestnut Street Bridge (Berwick) (ruin) | | Berwick and Nescopeck | southern end was in Luzerne County | 41°03′14″N 76°13′42″W | |

==== Luzerne County ====
| Bridge | Route | Location | Notes | Coordinates | Image |
|---|---|---|---|---|---|
| New Shickshinny-Mocanaqua Bridge | PA 239 | Shickshinny and Mocanaqua | Under construction 1994 | 41°08′43″N 76°08′47″W | |
| Old Shickshinny-Mocanaqua Bridge (removed) | former PA 239 | Shickshinny and Mocanaqua | replaced in 199? | 41°08′53″N 76°08′47″W | |
| Retreat Bridge | | Union Township and Retreat | Original Carey Avenue Bridge, dismantled in 1948 and dedicated to State Correctional Institution – Retreat in 1951. | 41°11′18″N 76°05′12″W | |
| Nanticoke Dam (defunct) | | West Nanticoke and Nanticoke | appears on USGS Ariels,(former canal feeder) 1830–1901 | 41°13′06″N 76°00′54″W | |
| Nanticoke Dam (proposed) | | West Nanticoke and Nanticoke | (proposed, inflatable) | 41°13′06″N 76°00′54″W | |
| Nanticoke Bridge | Conrail | West Nanticoke and Nanticoke | | 41°12′52″N 76°00′20″W | |
| Lower Broadway Street Bridge | | West Nanticoke and Nanticoke | | 41°12′52″N 76°00′20″W | |
| South Cross Valley Expressway | PA 29 | West Nanticoke and Nanticoke | | 41°12′49″N 75°59′07″W | |
| Plymouth-Breslau Bridge (Breslau Bridge) (defunct) | | Plymouth and Lynnwood | 1914 Parker truss bridge demolished 2001. Also referred to as the Fellows Avenue or Hanover Street Bridge. | 41°14′15″N 75°56′37″W | |
| Carey Avenue Bridge | | Larksville and Lynnwood via Richard I. | | 41°14′24″N 75°55′57″W | |
| Delaware and Hudson Railway Bridge | | Plymouth and Wilkes-Barre | Removed after 1999 | 41°14′47″N 75°55′2″W | |
| Wilkes-Barre Railroad Connecting Bridge (Black Diamond Bridge) | | Kingston and Wilkes-Barre | | 41°14′55″N 75°54′18″W | |
| Market Street Bridge | | Kingston and Wilkes-Barre | | 41°14′57″N 75°53′06″W | A stone arch with stone eagle is in the background near the entrance to a bridge that continues beyond it. A stone banister and railing in the foreground. |
| Veterans Memorial Bridge | | Kingston and Wilkes-Barre | Also known as Pierce Street Bridge or North Street Bridge | 41°15′13″N 75°52′47″W | |
| Wilkes-Barre Railroad Connecting Bridge (Gauntlet Bridge) | | Kingston and Wilkes-Barre | | 41°15′42″N 75°52′15″W | |
| North Cross Valley Expressway | PA 309 | Kingston and Wilkes-Barre | 2 1/2 bridges, highway and ramps | 41°16′01″N 75°51′59″W | |
| Wilkes-Barre Dam | | Wilkes-Barre | (proposed, inflatable) | | |
| Eighth Street Bridge | | Wyoming and Port Blanchard | | 41°18′15″N 75°49′48″W | |
| Water Street Bridge (Pittston) (Fireman's Memorial Bridge) | | West Pittston and Pittston | | 41°19′28″N 75°47′34″W | |
| Fort Jenkins Bridge | US 11 | West Pittston and Pittston | 1928 built | 41°19′36″N 75°47′29″W | |
| Railroad bridge | Conrail | West Pittston and Upper Pittston | | 41°20′13″N 75°47′35″W | |
| Rail bridge possibly a trail bridge | possibly Conrail | West Pittston and Pittston Yards | Abandoned appears in USGS Ariels | 41°21′00″N 75°48′04″W | |

==== Wyoming and Bradford Counties ====
| Bridge | Route | Location | Notes | Coordinates | Image |
|---|---|---|---|---|---|
| | PA 92 | West Falls and Falls | | 41°27′42″N 75°51′14″W | |
| Power transmission crossing | | Eaton Township and Osterhout | on USGS aerial imagery | 41°30′34″N 75°54′29″W | |
| Joseph W. Hunter Highway Bridge | PA 29 | Eaton Township and Tunkhannock | old bridge was just west | 41°32′05″N 75°56′52″W | |
| Bridge Road Bridge (ruin) | formerly PA 87 | North Mehoopany and Mehoopany Station | | 41°34′34″N 76°03′30″W | |
| | PA 87 | North Mehoopany and Mehoopany Station | | 41°34′40″N 76°03′33″W | |
| Church Street Bridge | PA SR 3001 | Windham Township and Laceyville | | 41°38′31″N 76°09′39″W | |
| | PA SR 2010 | Terry Township and Wyalusing | | 41°39′24″N 76°15′46″W | |
| Rome Road Bridge | PA 187 | Macedonia, Asylum Township and Wysox Township | | 41°46′04″N 76°23′45″W | |
| Veterans Memorial Bridge | US 6 | Towanda and Wysox Township | 1986 replacement of an open grate bridge located two blocks upstream at Bridge Street. | 41°45′44″N 76°26′19″W | |
| railroad bridge | Norfolk Southern | Towanda and Wysox Township | | 41°46′48″N 76°26′20″W | |
| James Street Bridge | PA SR 1041 | North Towanda and Wysox Township | Open grate bridge destroyed by Hurricane Agnes, replaced shortly thereafter with a concrete structure. | 41°47′28″N 76°26′38″W | |
| Ulster Bridge | PA SR 1022 | Ulster and Sheshequin | Open grate bridge replaced in 2007 with a concrete structure. | 41°50′59″N 76°29′36″W | |
| Athens River Bridge | PA SR 1056 | Athens and Athens Township | 98-year-old open grate bridge replaced in 2006 with concrete structure. | 41°57′27″N 76°30′52″W | |
| Lockhart Street Bridge | | Sayre and Athens Township | | 41°58′52″N 76°30′34″W | |

=== New York ===
==== Tioga County ====
| Bridge | Route | Location | Notes | Coordinates | Image |
|---|---|---|---|---|---|
| Southern Tier Expressway bridges | NY 17 | Ellistown, Barton town and Litchfield, Nichols town | two twin bridges, on either side of island | 42°00′28″N 76°27′55″W | |
| Smithboro and Nichols Bridge (ruin) | | Smithboro and Hoopers Valley | | 42°01′45″N 76°24′01″W | |
| | NY 282 | Smithboro and Nichols village | | 42°01′42″N 76°23′05″W | |
| Court Street Bridge | NY 96 | Owego | Connects NY 434 and NY 17 (future I-86) with NY 17C Fifth bridge on site; completely rebuilt in 2003 | 42°06′01″N 76°15′37″W | |
| Hiawatha Bridge | NY 434 CONN; NY 17 Access Road (Reference Route 960J) | Owego | Connects NY 434 and NY 17 to NY 17C Expressway standard; opened in 1968 | 42°05′28″N 76°13′47″W | |
| Apalachin-Campville Bridge also known as "Millennium Bridge" | NY 962J (Valley View Drive) | Apalachin and Campville | Connects NY 434 and NY 17 (Exit 66) to NY 17C Opened 2001 | 42°04′01″N 76°08′35″W | |

==== Western Broome County (Binghamton Area) ====
| Bridge | Route | Location | Notes | Coordinates | Image |
| Vestal–Endicott Bridge | CR 48 | Vestal and Endicott | Connects Vestal Road and North Main Street with Vestal Avenue Effectively connects NY 434 with NY 26 and NY 17C | 42°05′31″N 76°03′21″W | |
| Thomas J. Watson Memorial Bridge | NY 26 | Vestal and Endicott | Connects NY 434 and NY 17 (Exit 67) with NY 17C Expressway; opened in 1962 | 42°05′45″N 76°02′37″W | |
| | NY 17 | Vestal and Endicott | Four lane | 42°06′01″N 76°01′28″W | |
| Johnson City Power Plant dam | | Willow Point and Johnson City | | 42°06′39″N 75°58′40″W | |
| railroad bridge | Erie Lackawanna Railway | Willow Point and Johnson City | | 42°06′36″N 75°58′36″W | |
| C. Fred Johnson Bridge | NY 201 | Willow Point and Johnson City | Connects NY 434 and Vestal Road with the Johnson City flyover and roundabout and effectively NY 17 (Exit 70) and Harry L. Drive; opened in 1954 | 42°06′12″N 75°58′09″W | |
| dam | | Binghamton | on either side of I. | 42°05′37″N 75°56′46″W | |
| dam | | Binghamton | just above confluence of Chenango River | 42°05′32″N 75°54′59″W | |
| South Washington Street Parabolic Bridge | Closed to vehicular traffic | Binghamton | Connects NY 434 and Conklin Avenue with NY 992E Only pedestrian and bicycle traffic allowed; closed to vehicular traffic since 1969; triple lenticular truss bridge dating to 1886 | 42°05′33″N 75°54′53″W | |
| State Street Bridge | NY 434 | Binghamton | Carries NY 434 to NY 363, NY 992E, and US 11 Interchanges with Conklin Avenue and Tremont Avenue | 42°05′35″N 75°54′41″W | |
| Exchange Street Bridge | | Binghamton | Connects Conklin Avenue with NY 363 | 42°05′47″N 75°54′28″W | |
| Rockbottom Dam | | Binghamton | | 42°05′38″N 75°54′17″W | |
| Rockbottom Street Bridge | | Binghamton | Removed between 1999 and 2002. | 42°05′39″N 75°54′11″W | |
| Tompkins Street Bridge | NY 7 | Binghamton | Connects US 11 with Binghamton's Southside | 42°06′05″N 75°53′49″W | |
| Railroad Bridge | Erie Lackawanna Railway | Binghamton | | 42°06′08″N 75°52′44″W | |
| Conklin-Kirkwood Road Bridge | CR 177 | Conklin and Kirkwood | Connects NY 7 with Spud Lane, Colesville Road, and effectively US 11 and the NY 17 – I-81 concurrency | 42°05′41″N 75°50′17″W | |
| Conklin Forks Road Bridge | CR 20 | Conklin Forks and Kirkwood | Connects County Route 8 and County Route 141 with Bridge Street, US 11 and I-81 (Exit 1). | 42°02′11″N 75°48′10″W | |

=== Pennsylvania ===
==== Susquehanna County ====
| Bridge | Route | Location | Notes | Coordinates | Image |
| Main Street Bridge | US 11 | Hallstead and Great Bend | | 41°57′49″N 75°44′30″W | |
| Interstate Bridges | I-81 | Hallstead and Great Bend | twin spans | 41°57′49″N 75°44′15″W | |
| Railroad bridges | Conrail | Susquehanna and Oakland via I. | bridge on either side of I. | 41°56′34″N 75°37′12″W | |
| Oakland Dam | No public thoroughfare | Susquehanna and Oakland | low head dam | 41°56′37″N 75°37′01″W | |
| Bridge | PA 92; PA 171 | Susquehanna and Oakland | Recent construction (not on topos) | 41°56′52″N 75°36′26″W | |
| Westfall Avenue | | Susquehanna and Oakland | | 41°56′55″N 75°36′16″W | |

=== New York ===
==== Eastern Broome County ====
| Bridge | Route | Location | Notes | Coordinates | Image |
| CR 28 Bridge | CR 28 (Chapel St) | Windsor | | | |
| Ouaquaga Bridge | | Ouaquaga | The bridge is claimed to be the only double lenticular truss bridge in New York State. The bridge, opened in 1889, has since been bypassed, but still exists as a landmark. A parking lot has been built for the bridge and an adjacent river access. | | |
| CR 229 Bridge | CR 229 (Bridge St) | Center Village | Built in 1990 | | |
| Old Center Village Bridge | parallel to CR 229 bridge | | Built in 1890; still stands, but closed to all traffic in 1990. | | |
| I-88 Bridges | I-88 | Nineveh | Double Two lane Concrete bridges that are located in the Town of Colesville, just south of the hamlet of Nineveh | | |
| CR 233 Bridge | CR 233 | Nineveh | | | |

==== Chenango County ====
| Bridge | Route | Location | Notes | Coordinates | Image |
| I-88 Exit 7/State Route 41 Bridge | NY 41 | Village of Afton. | | | |
| I-88 Exit 8/State Route 206 Bridge | NY 206 | Village of Bainbridge, NY | The newest version of the Route 206 bridge was completed in 2007. This bridge sits on the site of the previous bridge, which existed from 1958 to 2007. The newest iteration is the 5th bridge built on that site. The original crossing was a two lane wooden covered bridge from the late 18th century that collapsed during a winter ice jam. Part of the wooden deck of the original bridge can be seen in the river bed below the North end of the bridge, off the western side. | | |

==== Otsego County / Delaware County ====
| Bridge | Route | Location | Notes | Coordinates | Image |
| State Route 8 Bridge | NY 8 | Village of Sidney | A Girder bridge located on the west end of the Village of Sidney. This bridge provides two wide lanes of traffic for I-88's connection to Route 8. | | |
| Main St. Bridge | | Village of Sidney | a Truss bridge located in the Village of Sidney on Main St. | | |
| D&H Trestle | | Village of Sidney | A Delaware and Hudson Railway Trestle bridge located in the East end of the | | |
| I-88 Exit 10 Bridge | I-88 Access Road | Town of Unadilla | A modern concrete crossing that connects Village of Unadilla to | | |
| Bridge Street Bridge | | Town of Unadilla | Demolished. | | |
| I-88 Exit 11 Bridge | NY 357 | Town of Unadilla/Sidney | a.k.a. the Green Bridge, located in the Village of Unadilla, is a large two span iron Truss bridge connects the Village of Unadilla to Interstate 88 via State Route 357. | | |
| Wells Bridge (Original) | | | The original Wells Bridge is a two lane Iron truss Bridge with a "holey deck" that is accessible to pedestrians, only. There are gates at each end of the bridge to prevent vehicle traffic, and the maximum weight is listed as 10 people. | | |
| County Route 44 Bridge, Hamlet of Wells Bridge (1990s) | CR 44 | | An upstream replacement for the old Iron Truss Bridge. Built as a two lane Girder bridge and located in the Hamlet of Wells Bridge. Connects Wells Bridge to the Town of Sidney. | | |

==== Otsego County ====
| Bridge | Route | Location | Notes | Coordinates | Image |
| I-88 Exit 12, Otego Bridge | | | A modern concrete crossing that connects Village of Otego to Interstate 88. | | |
| Otego's River St Bridge | | | An Iron bridge w/ Asphalt deck which had been built in 1905, but was closed to all traffic in 1977 and demolished in 1987. Prior to closing, it provided a quick connection from River Street in Village of Otego to the Village of Franklin via County Route 48 (also known as the Back River Rd). | | |
| D&H Trestle | | | A Delaware and Hudson Railway Through Truss Bridge located approximately 0.35 miles north of River Street in the Village of Otego. | | |
| Ryndes Bridge | | | A Delaware and Hudson Railway Trestle bridge named in honor of D&H Engineer James Ryndes, who died when an earlier bridge at the same location collapsed underneath his train and fell into the Susquehanna River. This bridge is located in the SE corner of Town of Otego just west of the I-88 Town of Otego Bridges and 2.85 miles north of Otego Village. | | |
| I-88 Bridges | I-88 | Town of Otego | twin concrete bridges located in the SE corner of Otego (town), New York provide an East and a West crossing for Interstate 88. | | |
| St Highway 205 bridge | NY 205 | Town of Oneonta | a four lane Girder Bridge located in the Oneonta (town), New York's West End. This bridge provides a crossing of the river for Oneonta's West End Residents, and access to Interstate 88. | | |
| I-88 Exit 14 Bridge | | Town of Oneonta | a four lane Girder Bridge connecting the City of Oneonta to Interstate 88 and State Highway 23 & 28 in the Town of Oneonta. | | |
| I-88 Exit 15 Bridge | NY 23 / NY 28 (James F. Lettis Hwy) | | a four lane Girder Bridge connecting the City of Oneonta to Interstate 88 and State Highway 23 in the Town of Oneonta. | | |
| Emmons Bridge | CR 47 | | a four lane Girder Bridge located SE of Emmons, NY on County Route 47. This bridge provides a crossing of the river for Oneonta's East End Residents. | | |
| I-88 Exit 16 Bridges | I-88 / NY 28 | | twin bridges located just east of Oneonta, New York, provide an east and a west crossing for Interstate 88. | | |
| D&H Trestle | | | A Delaware and Hudson Railway Trestle bridge located just south of the Colliersville Bridge. | | |
| Colliersville Bridge | NY 7 | Milford (town), New York; Hamlet of Colliersville. | | | |
| Route 28 Bridge | NY 28 | North of Colliersville | the main thoroughfare between I-88 and Cooperstown, New York. | | |
| Portlandville Bridge | | inlet of Goodyear Lake | This a new Girder bridge that replaced an older Truss bridge around 2002. | | |
| CACV Trestle 1 | Cooperstown and Charlotte Valley Railroad | | Trestle located just north of the Portlandville Bridge. | | |
| East Main St. Bridge | | | a two lane Girder bridge located on East Main St. in Milford, New York. | | |
| CACV Trestle 2 | Cooperstown and Charlotte Valley Railroad | | Trestle located just south of the Index Bridge. | | |
| Index Bridge | | | Index Bridge is a two lane Truss bridge crossing the river as County Highway 11c outside of Index, New York. | | |
| CACV Trestle 3 | Cooperstown and Charlotte Valley Railroad | | Trestle located just north of the Index Bridge. | | |
| Phoenix Mills Bridge | | | two lane, Iron Truss bridge, located on Phoenix Mills Rd in Phoenix Mills, New York that is now open to pedestrian traffic, only. | | |
| CACV Trestle 4 | Cooperstown and Charlotte Valley Railroad | | Trestle located just north of the Phoenix Mills Bridge. | | |
| Susquehanna St Bridge | | Village of Cooperstown | is a two lane bridge located in Cooperstown, New York that passes over the river near the Clark Sports Center. | | |
| Mill St Bridge | | Village of Cooperstown | is a two-lane Bailey bridge located in Cooperstown, New York that passes over the Otsego Lake dam. | | |
| Cooperstown Footbridge | | | footbridge located between the Main St. and Mill St. Bridges. | | |
| Main Street Bridge | | Village of Cooperstown | is a two lane bridge located in Cooperstown, New York over the mouth of Otsego Lake just after the river begins to form a channel. | | |

== West Branch Susquehanna River ==
From Sunbury up the western branch to the headwaters.

=== Pennsylvania ===
==== Northumberland/Union and Lycoming Counties, Williamsport ====
| Bridge | Route | Location | Notes | Coordinates | Image |
|---|---|---|---|---|---|
| Barry King Bridge | US 11 | Monroe Township and Northumberland | | 40°53′00″N 76°47′54″W | |
| CSVT River Bridge | PA 147 | Union Township and Point Township | | | |
| Purple Heart Highway Bridge | PA 45 | Lewisburg and East Lewisburg | | 40°58′01″N 76°52′43″W | |
| railroad bridge | Penn Central Railroad | Lewisburg and East Lewisburg | | 40°58′04″N 76°52′44″W | |
| railroad bridge | Reading Railroad | West Milton and Milton via Island | | 41°00′48″N 76°51′50″W | Only east side of bridge is shown. |
| road bridges (either side of island) | PA 642 | West Milton and Milton via Island | | 41°01′03″N 76°51′42″W | |
| Interstate bridges | I-80 | White Deer Township and Turbot Township | Twin span | 41°03′06″N 76°51′17″W | |
| West Brimmer Avenue Bridge | | White Deer and Watsontown | | 41°04′50″N 76°51′55″W | |
| Allenwood River Bridge | PA 44 | Allenwood and Dewart | | 41°06′28″N 76°53′24″W | |
| railroad bridge | Conrail | Montgomery and Delaware Township | | 41°00′48″N 76°51′50″W | |
| 2nd Street Bridge | PA 54; PA 405 | Montgomery and Delaware Township | | 41°09′57″N 76°52′11″W | |
| railroad bridge | Conrail | Montgomery and Muncy | | 41°11′28″N 76°48′21″W | |
| | PA 405 | Muncy Station and Muncy | | 41°11′28″N 76°48′21″W | |
| railroad bridge (ruins) | Conrail | South Williamsport and Williamsport | | 41°14′36″N 76°59′07″W | |
| Carl E. Stotz Memorial Little League Bridge | US 15 | South Williamsport and Williamsport | 4 lane bridge | 41°14′14″N 76°59′51″W | |
| Low head dam | No public thoroughfare | South Williamsport and Williamsport | | 41°14′00″N 77°00′22″W | |
| Maynard Street Bridge | | South Williamsport and Williamsport | | 41°13′44″N 77°01′08″W | |
| Arch Street Bridge | | Duboistown and Williamsport | | 41°13′33″N 77°02′38″W | |
| Antler's Truss Railroad Bridge | Lycoming Valley Railroad | Nisbet and Glosser View | 7 Span through-truss bridge. Formerly known as Bridge No. 138 along Eastern Division of the Philadelphia and Erie Railroad. Built in 1907. | 41°13′29″N 77°06′34″W | |
| | PA 44 | Antes Fort and Jersey Shore via Long Island | Bridge on either side of island | 41°12′08″N 77°14′46″W | |

==== Clinton County ====
| Bridge | Route | Location | Notes | Coordinates |
|---|---|---|---|---|
| Katie's Crossing | Pedestrian trail (formerly Conrail) | McElhattan and Avis | | 41°09′55″N 77°20′06″W |
| | US 220 | McElhattan and Avis | twin span | 41°10′09″N 77°20′12″W |
| Bridge Road | | McElhattan and Crestmont | | 41°09′55″N 77°21′58″W |
| River Road bridges | | Lock Haven and Liberty Church via Great Island | Bridge on either side of island | 41°08′27″N 77°24′23″W |
| Woodward Road Bridge (a.k.a. Constitution Bridge) | PA 150 | Lock Haven and Dunnstown | | 41°08′27″N 77°24′23″W |
| Lock Haven Dam | No public thoroughfare | Lock Haven and Woodward School | low head dam | 41°08′18″N 77°25′59″W |
| Jay Street Bridge | PA 664 | Lock Haven and Lockport | | 41°08′21″N 77°26′30″W |
| railroad bridge | Penn Central Railroad | Bald Eagle Township and Farrandsville | | 41°10′22″N 77°29′23″W |
| Hyner Bridge | PA 120 | Chapman Township and Hyner | | 41°08′21″N 77°26′30″W |
| Memorial Bridge | PA 144 | South Renovo and Renovo | | 41°19′32″N 77°44′46″W |
| West End Bridge | | South Renovo and Renovo | dogleg, replaced in 1972 | 41°19′26″N 77°45′01″W |

==== Centre and eastern Clearfield Counties ====
| Bridge | Route | Location | Notes | Coordinates |
|---|---|---|---|---|
| Karthaus Bridge | PA 879 | Burnside Township and Karthaus | | 41°07′01″N 78°06′33″W |
| Rolling Stone Bridge | PA 1011 | Sylvan Grove and Rolling Stone | | 41°03′26″N 78°09′26″W |
| Deer Creek Road Bridge | | Graham Township and Coudley | | 41°04′40″N 78°14′07″W |
| Deer Creek Road Bridge (ruin) | | Graham Township and Coudley | abutments only | 41°04′34″N 78°14′12″W |
| Deer Creek Road Bridge (ruin) | | Graham Township and Coudley | abutments only | 41°04′34″N 78°14′12″W |
| railroad bridge | Conrail | Bradford Township and Shawville | west of Shawville Tunnel | 41°04′03″N 78°21′35″W |
| | PA 970 | Bradford Township and Shawville | | 41°04′08″N 78°21′41″W |
| Shawville Dam | | Bradford Township and Shawville | | 41°04′08″N 78°21′54″W |
| | I-80 | Bradford Township and Lawrence Township | twin bridges | 41°02′17″N 78°23′22″W |
| railroad bridge | Conrail | Bradford Township and Lawrence Township | north of Fulton Tunnel | 41°02′05″N 78°23′12″W |
| railroad bridge | Conrail | Clearfield and Lawrence Township | | 41°01′36″N 78°24′20″W |
| | PA 879 | Clearfield and Lawrence Township | | 41°01′33″N 78°24′50″W |
| railroad bridge | B&O | Clearfield | | 41°01′57″N 78°26′00″W |
| Clearfield Dam | No public thoroughfare | Clearfield | low head dam | 41°01′40″N 78°26′16″W |
| Bridge Street Bridge | US 322; PA 153 | Clearfield | | 41°01′36″N 78°26′20″W |
| Market Street Bridge | Near PA 153 | Clearfield | | 41°01′19″N 78°26′30″W |
| Washington Street Bridge | PA 1001 | Riverview and Hyde | | 41°00′16″N 78°27′26″W |
| Twenty-Eighth Division Highway Bridge | PA 879 | Riverview and Hyde | | 40°59′42″N 78°27′50″W |
| railroad bridge | Conrail | Susquehanna Bridge and Pike Township | | 40°58′51″N 78°29′42″W |
| Porters Bridge | Old Erie Pike | Susquehanna Bridge and Pike Township | | 40°58′26″N 78°29′26″W |
| railroad bridge | B&O | Curwensville | | 40°58′36″N 78°30′46″W |
| Stadium Drive Bridge | | Curwensville | | 40°58′27″N 78°31′12″W |
| railroad bridge | B&O | Curwensville | | 40°58′12″N 78°30′48″W |
| gauging station dam | No public thoroughfare | Pike Township and Curwensville | appears on topographic map | 40°57′40″N 78°31′02″W |
| Susquehanna Avenue Bridge | PA 453 | Pike Township and Curwensville | | 40°57′39″N 78°31′39″W |
| Curwensville Dam | No public thoroughfare | Pike Township south of Curwensville | | 40°57′14″N 78°31′35″W |

==== Western Clearfield County ====
| Bridge | Route | Location | Notes | Coordinates |
|---|---|---|---|---|
| | PA 729 | Ferguson Township and Lumber City | | 40°55′22″N 78°34′35″W |
| | PA 3005 | Greenwood Township and Bells Landing | | 40°54′38″N 78°38′50″W |
| railroad bridge | Conrail | Greenwood Township and Bells Landing | | 40°54′28″N 78°39′33″W |
| Zorger Road Bridge | | Greenwood Township and Cory Run | | 40°54′34″N 78°40′00″W |
| Camp Corbly Road Bridge | | Bower and Camp Corbly | | 40°53′49″N 78°40′38″W |
| railroad bridge | Conrail | Mahaffey | | 40°52′54″N 78°43′47″W |
| Colonel Drake Highway Bridge | PA 36 | Mahaffey | | 40°52′41″N 78°43′48″W |
| railroad bridge | Conrail | Whisky Run confluence, near McGees Mills | | 40°53′04″N 78°45′18″W |
| McGees Mills Covered Bridge | Covered Bridge Road | Bell Township and McGees Mills | | 40°52′48″N 78°45′55″W |
| ford or washed out bridge | | Bell Township south of McGees Mills | appears on topographic map and mapquest | 40°52′15″N 78°45′20″W |
| railroad bridge | Conrail | Bell Township south of McGees Mills | | 40°52′18″N 78°45′55″W |
| Snyder Road Bridge | | Bell Township south of McGees Mills | appears on topographic map, aerials and Google Maps | 40°52′21″N 78°46′13″W |
| dam or narrow bridge | no public thoroughfare | Bell Township south of McGees Mills | appears on topographic map | 40°52′20″N 78°46′13″W |
| foot bridge | | Burnside Township and Bell Township in saw tooth of township borders | appears on topographic map | 40°50′42″N 78°47′04″W |
| railroad bridge | Conrail | Dowler Junction, Burnside Township | | 40°49′51″N 78°47′20″W |
| | US 219 | Burnside | | 40°49′19″N 78°47′19″W |
| | US 219 | Burnside | | 40°48′57″N 78°47′11″W |
| | US 219 | Burnside | | 40°48′32″N 78°47′05″W |
| Kantz Hill Road Bridge | | Burnside Township, south of Burnside | | 40°47′37″N 78°46′54″W |
| foot or narrow bridge | | Chetremon Golf Course, Burnside Township | | 40°45′30″N 78°47′23″W |
| Butterbaugh Road Bridge | | Burnside Township and Stifflertown | or Stifflertown Road sources vary | 40°44′09″N 78°47′49″W |

==== Indiana and Cambria Counties ====
| Bridge | Route | Location | Notes | Coordinates |
|---|---|---|---|---|
| Cherry Street Bridge | PA 580 | Cherry Tree | | 40°43′44″N 78°48′19″W |
| dam | | Cherry Tree | appears on topographic map | 40°43′12″N 78°48′05″W |
| Peg Run Road Bridge | PA 240 | Susquehanna Township near Emeigh | | 40°42′25″N 78°48′07″W |
| railroad bridge (ruin) | Conrail | Susquehanna Township near Emeigh | old grade, bridge status uncertain | 40°42′00″N 78°48′13″W |
| Shawna Road Bridge | US 219 | Susquehanna Township near Greenwich | | 40°41′06″N 78°48′27″W |
| Shawna Road Bridge | US 219 | Garmantown | | 40°40′43″N 78°48′24″W |
| railroad bridge | Conrail | Garmantown | | 40°40′42″N 78°48′25″W |
| Redbud Street Bridge | | Barnesboro | possibly 22nd St. sources vary | 40°40′05″N 78°47′28″W |
| Bethwell Road Bridge | | Barnesboro | possibly Bethwell St. or Maple Ave. sources vary | 40°39′52″N 78°47′06″W |
| Susquehanna Avenue Foot Bridge | | Barnesboro | possibly Susquehanna St. sources vary | 40°39′40″N 78°47′02″W |
| Barr Avenue Bridge | | Barnesboro | | 40°39′27″N 78°47′05″W |
| railroad bridge | Conrail | Barnesboro | | 40°39′05″N 78°46′54″W |
| Twenty Fourth Street Bridge | PA 271 | Spangler | | 40°38′49″N 78°46′43″W |
| Sixteenth Street Bridge | | Spangler | | 40°38′21″N 78°46′15″W |
| Patterson Road Bridge | | North of Watkins, Barr Township | | 40°38′21″N 78°46′15″W |
| Thirteen Hill Road Bridge | | South of Watkins, Barr Township | | 40°37′08″N 78°45′48″W |
| mine bridges | | Barr Township, west of Barnes | also conveyors | 40°36′52″N 78°45′41″W |
| railroad bridge | Conrail | Barnes, West Carroll Township | | 40°36′42″N 78°45′31″W |
| Township Drive Bridge | | Bakerton, West Carroll Township | | 40°36′21″N 78°45′09″W |
| Foot bridge | | Bakerton, West Carroll Township | Shows on USGS ariels | 40°36′11″N 78°44′54″W |
| Reed Street Bridge | | Bakerton, West Carroll Township | | 40°36′05″N 78°44′47″W |
| Goodway Road Bridge | | Bakerton, West Carroll Township | | 40°35′54″N 78°44′40″W |
| railroad bridge | Penn Central Railroad | South of Bakerton, West Carroll Township | mine spur, possibly removed | 40°35′36″N 78°44′30″W |
| Number 6 Road Bridge | | South of Bakerton, West Carroll Township | | 40°35′35″N 78°44′28″W |
| Deveaux Street Bridge | | West of Carrolltown | | 40°35′44″N 78°44′09″W |
| Smith Road Bridge | | West of Carrolltown | | 40°35′38″N 78°44′06″W |
| railroad bridge | Penn Central Railroad | West of Carrolltown | mine spur | 40°35′48″N 78°43′57″W |
| Myers Road Bridge | | West of Carrolltown | | 40°35′55″N 78°43′44″W |
| railroad bridge | Penn Central Railroad | West of Carrolltown | | 40°35′55″N 78°43′39″W |
