= Market Street Bridge =

Market Street Bridge may refer to:

- Market Street Bridge (Chattanooga), officially the Chief John Ross Bridge, across the Tennessee River in Chattanooga, Tennessee
- Market Street Bridge (Clearfield, Pennsylvania), across the Susquehanna River
- Market Street Bridge (Ohio River), between Ohio and West Virginia
- Market Street Bridge (Passaic River), between Passaic and Wallington, New Jersey
- Market Street Bridge (Philadelphia), across the Schuylkill River in Philadelphia, Pennsylvania
- Market Street Bridge (Susquehanna River), in Harrisburg, Pennsylvania
- Market Street Bridge (Wilkes-Barre, Pennsylvania), across the Susquehanna River
- South Market Street Bridge, across the Christina River in Wilmington, Delaware
- Carl E. Stotz Memorial Little League Bridge, formerly Market Street Bridge, across the Susquehanna River in Williamsport, Pennsylvania

== See also ==
- Market Street (disambiguation)
