= Carroll Township, Pennsylvania =

Carroll Township is the name of some places in the U.S. state of Pennsylvania:

- Carroll Township, Perry County, Pennsylvania
- Carroll Township, Washington County, Pennsylvania
- Carroll Township, York County, Pennsylvania

== See also ==
- East Carroll Township, Cambria County, Pennsylvania
- West Carroll Township, Pennsylvania
