= West Carroll =

West Carroll may refer to:

- West Carroll Parish, Louisiana
- West Carroll Township, Pennsylvania

== See also ==
- Carol (disambiguation)
