= South Pennsylvania Railroad Bridge (Harrisburg, Pennsylvania) =

- Coordinates: 40.2493°N 76.8834°W
- Crosses: Susquehanna River
- Locale: (ruins) Cumberland County, Pennsylvania and Harrisburg, Pennsylvania

The South Pennsylvania Railroad Bridge was a proposed structure that would have carried the South Pennsylvania Railroad rail lines across the Susquehanna River between Cumberland County, Pennsylvania and Harrisburg, Pennsylvania. Work began on the South Penn and was abruptly halted by banker J. P. Morgan in 1885 when he called a truce in the railroad wars that threatened to undermine investor confidence in the Pennsylvania and New York Central railroads. Of the twenty three piers originally built, eight piers still rise from the water at the west side of the river near the Philadelphia & Reading Railroad Bridge.

== See also ==
- List of crossings of the Susquehanna River
