= Market Street Railway =

Market Street Railway may refer to:

- Market Street Subway in San Francisco, California, USA
- Market Street Railway (nonprofit), a nonprofit organization that supports the operation of the F Market historic streetcar line in San Francisco
- Market Street Railway (transit operator), a former commercial streetcar operator in San Francisco
- Market–Frankford Line in Philadelphia, Pennsylvania, USA
- SEPTA subway–surface trolley lines in Philadelphia, Pennsylvania, USA
- Market Street tram stop in Manchester, United Kingdom

== See also ==
- Market Street
