= Conrad Luther =

- Bernhard Marianus Luther
- Born: February 28, 1754; Thüringen Germany
- Died: August 13, 1822 (68); Carrolltown, Pennsylvania
- Relatives: Martin Luther (5th grandfather)
- Military career
- Allegiance: Hessians (1776–1778)
- Service years: 1776-1777

Conrad Luther (February 28, 1754 – August 13, 1822) born as Berhard Marianus Luther, was a Hessian soldier who defected to the United States.

== Early life ==
Conrad was born as Bernhard Marianus Luther in 1754 in Thuringen to Johannes Melchoir Luther (1725–1788) and Margarethe Maria Wagner (1723–1793). Johannes was a professor of medicine at the University of Erfurt and a descendant of Martin Luther, the founder of Protestantism.

== Military Life ==
By the 1770s most of Conrad's siblings had immigrated to the American Colonies including his brother Theophilus Luther (1755–1785), who fought for the Continental Army in Pennsylvania during the American Revolution. He deserted while stationed in New Jersey in 1778 and at some point he fled and was sheltered by Elizabeth Bart or Bard, though some sources have her maiden name as Smith, (1770–1835), a young eight-year-girl whom Conrad befriended.

After making his way to Lancaster, he signed an oath of allegiance on November 10, 1782, renouncing any allegiance to George III, Great Britain, or any of its supporting armies.

== Post-Service Life ==
Following his service, he married Elizabeth on December 20, 1789, and had 7 children with her: Christopher Christian Luther (1787–1880), John Luther (1790–1791) George Luther (1792–1809), Mary Anna Luther (1793–1863), Jacob Luther (1794–1862) Jon William Luther (1800–1862) and William Luther (1802–1885). Conrad worked as a common laborer and farmer in Pennsylvania, converted to Catholicism in 1808 and lived in Carrolltown, until his death in 1822.
