= Peter Henry Lemke =

German Roman Catholic missionary in the United States

Peter Henry Lemke (or Lemcke) (b. at Rehna, Mecklenburg, 27 July 1796; d. at Carrolltown, Pennsylvania, 29 November 1882) was a German Roman Catholic missionary in the United States. He served as assistant to Demetrius Augustine Gallitzin.

== Life ==
Peter Henry Lemke was born 27 July 1796 at Rehna in Mecklenburg. His father was a magistrate. His maternal grandfather was the village schoolmaster and lived with the family, as did the elderly village doctor. With the aid of his grandfather and the doctor, who supplied him with story books, he received a good basic education. After the death of his grandfather, Peter ran away at the age of fourteen and applied for admission to the school at Schwerin. His father, who admired his initiative, wished him well, but due to reduced circumstances was unable to provide any financial assistance. Peter supported himself by giving music lessons, supplemented by the charity of the townspeople.

In 1813, at the age of eighteen, Lemke enlisted in the army to fight against Napoleon. He served until the end of the war, after which he enrolled in the Lutheran seminary at the University of Rostock. When not indulging in student dissipation, he read Stolberg's Religion of Jesus Christ, which made a lasting impression. In 1819, he passed his examinations for the ministry and accepted a position as tutor in a wealthy family near his hometown. Having developed religious reservations, he resigned his position and travelled for a while. In Ratisbon, through a former schoolfellow, he met and became friends with Melchior von Diepenbrock. They were of the same age and both war veterans. After Diepenbrock was ordained a Catholic priest, Lemke attended Father Diepenbrock's first Mass. Eight months later, Lemke applied to Bishop Johann Michael Sailer for admission to the Catholic Church. Sailer sent him to the Ratisbon diocesan seminary where he studied under Georg Michael Wittman. On 21 April 1824, he was received into the Church, Diepenbrock standing as godfather. Sailer sent him to one of his old parish priests, Father Buchner, pastor of a country parish near Ratsbon, to study theology, and on 11 April 1826 he was ordained. For the next three years, Father Lemke served as assistant to Buchner.

In 1829, he was called to Ratisbon to instruct the students of the high school, and to preach to the garrison. In 1831, he accepted the position of chaplain on an estate owned by Friedrich Christoph Schlosser near Heidelberg. As his duties there were not overtaxing, he soon took up the responsibilities of estate manager. In Heidelberg, he became friends with Clemens Brentano. A mutual friend, Dr. Raes, showed him a letter from Bishop Kenrick of Philadelphia deploring the lack of German priests to serve his parishioners. With the prodding of Brentano, Lemke determined to go to Philadelphia. Sending his baggage ahead, he set out on foot for Paris, where he took a steamboat to Le Havre. However, his baggage not yet having arrived, his departure was delayed some weeks. He spent the time ministering to other German emigrants awaiting departure. He later learned that the first packet boat had been lost at sea.

== America ==
On 20 August 1834, Lemke arrived in New York on the ship Florida and took a steamer to Philadelphia, where Bishop Kenrick assigned him as an assistant to Father Guth, pastor of Holy Trinity Church, Philadelphia, the first German national parish in the United States. On his first night, he was called out to attend a cholera patient. He went every day to the Bishop's residence to instruct Bishop Kenrick and his brother, Peter Richard Kenrick in German, while they, in turn, taught him English. His skill improved through his missionary tours in which he was often forced to communicate in English. Two months later, he was sent as assistant to the aged and infirm Prince Gallitzin at Loretto, Pennsylvania. In 1835, there were only four German priests in a diocese that covered Pennsylvania, New Jersey, and Delaware.

He took up his residence in the neighbouring town of Ebensburg, from where he attended to a portion of Father Gallitzin's district, about fifty miles in extent. He travelled by rail, stagecoach, wagon, and horseback to visit the scattered settlements. Lemke was a fearless horseman and delighted to give to the admiring settlers exhibitions of his skill in riding and subduing wild and untrained colts. In September 1835, he accompanied Bishop Kenrick on a visitation of the western part of Pennsylvania. One Sunday a month he attended the Catholics working on the Pennsylvania Main Line Canal and the Allegheny Portage Railroad at Johnstown. He and Father Gallitzin were the only priests in the county.

In the spring of 1837 he bought some land on which two years later he laid out a town which, in honour of the first Catholic Bishop in the United States, John Carroll, he called Carrolltown. He succeeded the deceased Father Gallitzin as pastor of Loretto in 1840. In October of that year Lemke became a naturalized citizen.

== Benedictine ==
In 1844, he returned briefly to Germany, partly as a vacation and partly to recruit more priests. At Saltzberg he was present at the consecration of his friend Diepenbrock as Prince-Bishop of Breslau. In Munich he met several Benedictines of the Monastery of Metten. Father Lemke was instrumental in bringing to the United States the first Benedictines, under the leadership of Father Boniface Wimmer, the future Archabbot of St. Vincent's, in Pennsylvania. Lemke himself joined the new Benedictine community in 1852.

In 1855 Lemke went as missionary to Kansas, and prepared the way for the foundation of St. Benedict's Abbey at Atchison. Lemke Hall, a residence hall at Benedictine College near St. Benedict's Abbey in Atchison, is named in his honor. In 1856 he was lost on the Kansas prairie in a driving rainstorm. As a convert, he was not in the habit of praying to Mary, but he did so then and shortly saw a faint light in the distance, where a woman in a distant cabin, whose young child had called out to her, had just lit a lantern. He attributed his rescue to Mary.

From 1861 to 1877 he was stationed at St. Michael's Church in Elizabeth, New Jersey. He was pastor of what is now Our Lady of Fatima Church from 1869 to 1877. He then moved to Carrolltown Monastery, which was built in 1865 as a priory of St. Vincent's Abbey. After an illness of several weeks, Father Henry died at Carrolltown on November 29, 1882 at the age of 86 years. Carrolltown Monastery closed in 1965.

== Works ==
He is the author of a life of Prince Gallitzin: Leben und Wirken des Prinzen Demetrius Augustin von Gallitzin (Münster, 1861).
