= East Bloomsburg Bridge =

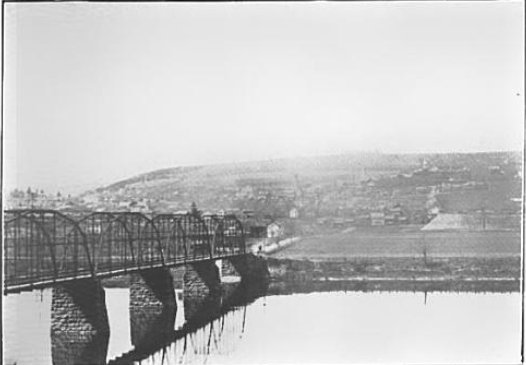
- The East Bloomsburg Bridge some time before 1915
- Coordinates: 40.9925°N 76.4393°W
- Carries: Pennsylvania Route 487
- Crosses: Susquehanna River
- Locale: Bloomsburg, Pennsylvania and Catawissa Township, Pennsylvania

Characteristics
- Total length: 1,150 feet (350 m)

Location
- Interactive map of East Bloomsburg Bridge

The East Bloomsburg Bridge was a bridge in Bloomsburg, Pennsylvania, in the United States. It carried the traffic of Pennsylvania Route 487, which is known as Ferry Road at that point. The bridge crossed the Susquehanna River. It was built in 1894 and torn down in 1987. The East Bloomsburg Bridge was documented by the Historic American Engineering Record in 1992.

== Description ==
The East Bloomsburg Bridge was 1,150 feet (350 m) long. Prior to its demolition and reconstruction, the bridge was made up of six pin-connected through truss spans. Each of these spans is 190 feet (58 m) long. Each of the spans consisted of ten panels that were each 19 feet (5.8 m) long. The panels were made of wrought iron and steel. The pins on the bridge were made of steel. The floor of the bridge was made of 2.5-inch-thick (6.4 cm) oak. The original design of the bridge was such that it could support a static load of 732 pounds (332 kg) per linear foot and a rolling load of 1,440 pounds (650 kg) per linear foot. The bridge's original weight limit was 13 short tons (12 t), but this was later decreased to 10 short tons (9.1 t). Shortly before its demolition, the bridge had two lanes, each 8.25 feet (2.51 m) wide. It had a clearance of 16 feet (4.9 m) at the beginning of the bridge and 16.92 feet (5.16 m) at the center.

The East Bloomsburg Bridge crosses the Susquehanna River between Bloomsburg and Catawissa Township. The bridge is located in the United States Geological Survey (USGS) Catawissa Quadrangle.

The East Bloomsburg Bridge was constructed with Pennsylvania-style trusses, also known as Petit trusses. These were based on a Pratt truss, but had several modifications. These included converting the top chord to a polygonal shape and dividing and deepening the panels.

== History and construction ==
On August 23, 1892, a group of citizens created a petition requesting that a free county bridge be built across the Susquehanna River in the vicinity of Bloomsburg. The citizens delivered this petition to a nearby court. However, on September 21, 1892, a group of citizens from Catawissa created a petition requesting that the money that was to be used for the East Bloomsburg Bridge would instead be used to build a replacement for the existing bridge in Catawissa, which was in poor condition at the time. Due to the opposing petition, the court in Bloomsburg ceased plans to build the bridge at Bloomsburg. However, despite more arguments from the opponents of the planned bridge in Bloomsburg, the court reversed its decision on November 9, 1893, stating that "the said bridge is necessary as a county bridge".

The original plans for the East Bloomsburg Bridge were drawn up on November 29, 1893.

The East Bloomsburg Bridge was built in 1894. The exact site chosen for it was near where a ferry crossed the Susquehanna River. It cost $73,299.67 to build. The cost of the superstructure was $35,500, the cost of the substructure was $35,415.46, and the cost of the filling and riprapping was $2384.21. The King Bridge Company was in charge of building the bridge's superstructure and Joseph Hendler was in charge of building the substructure. J. C. Brown constructed the plans for the bridge and was also the supervising engineer.

The East Bloomsburg Bridge was severely damaged during a flood in 1904, with parts of the bridge being swept away entirely.

The East Bloomsburg Bridge was heavily used from its construction until 1914. In 1914, it was redecked. The floor of the bridge was converted to laminated wood that was 4 inches (100 mm) thick and covered in a bituminous layer. In 1924, 3-inch-thick (7.6 cm) white oak planks were laid diagonally on the bridge. By 1954, the bridge was in a significant state of deterioration, so it was redecked again, this time with steel. Guard rails were also added in this year. By 1984, the bridge was experiencing problems with rusting and its weight limit had been reduced to less than 10 short tons (9.1 t).

By 1985, the bridge's ownership had passed to the Pennsylvania Department of Transportation.

The bridge was determined to be eligible for a listing on the National Register of Historic Places. However, on December 3, 1984, plans were made for the bridge's demolition in 1987. In the same year, it was replaced completely by a new bridge in the same location. Factors contributing to its demolition included its age and the lightweight design of its trusses. This new bridge was designated as the "Fort McClure Veterans Memorial Bridge" on December 5, 1988.

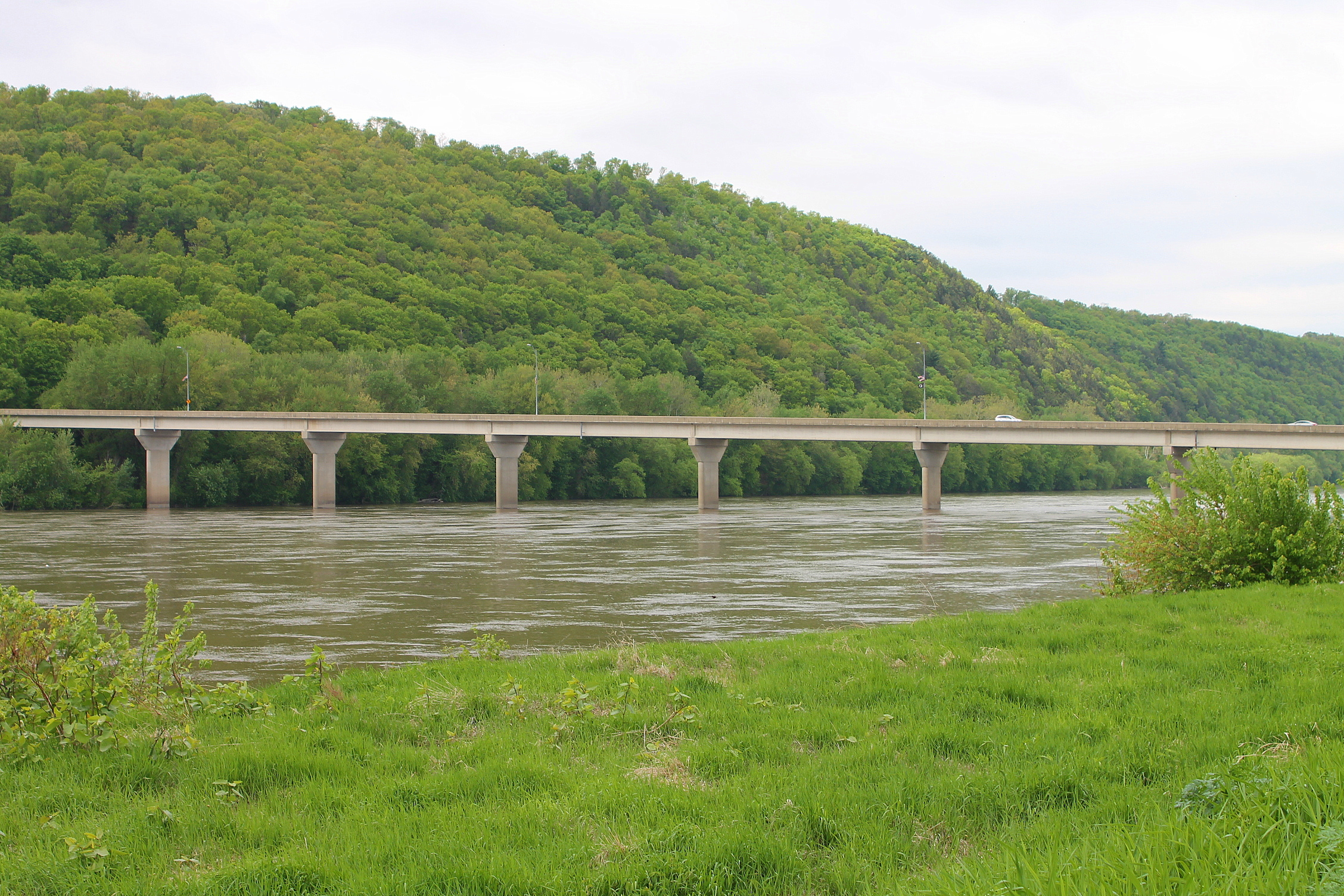
The bridge that replaced the East Bloomsburg Bridge

In 2005, USGS installed a gauging station near the site of the bridge. The things that were installed there included a microwave sensor for measuring stream flow and velocity.

== Uses and legacy ==
After the construction of the East Bloomsburg Bridge, it was easier to directly access the Coal Region, Pottsville and the Centre Turnpike Road (Note: The precursor to the modern-day Pennsylvania Route 61) from Bloomsburg. Around this time, it also aided in the town of Bloomsburg's ability to transition from having iron mining as its main industry to having textile mills as its main industry. The bridge accomplished this by providing easier access to goods. In 1987, the East Bloomsburg Bridge was used by 6000 cars every day on average. The bridge provides access to U.S. Route 11.

As of 1987, the East Bloomsburg Bridge may be been the last bridge in Pennsylvania to have Pennsylvania"style trusses.

== See also ==
- List of bridges documented by the Historic American Engineering Record in Pennsylvania
- List of crossings of the Susquehanna River
