= Boyd Wagner =

American aviator and fighter ace

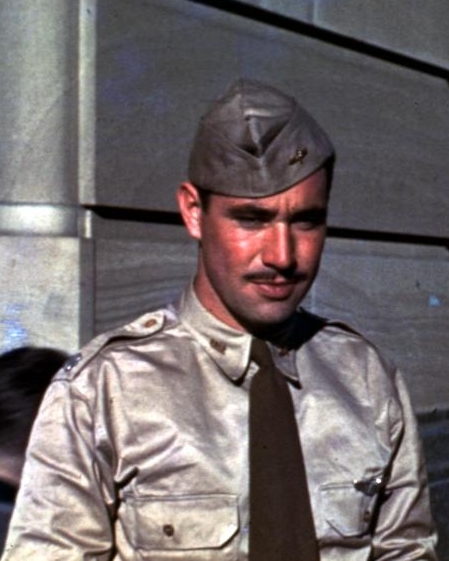
- Major Boyd Wagner
- Born: October 26, 1916; Emeigh, Pennsylvania
- Died: November 29, 1942 (aged 26); Walton County, Florida
- Burial place: Grandview Cemetery, Johnstown
- Military career
- Allegiance: United States
- Branch: United States Army Air Corps (1938–41); United States Army Air Forces (1941–42)
- Service years: 1938–1942
- Rank: Lieutenant Colonel
- Commands: 17th Pursuit Squadron
- Conflicts: World War II
- Awards: Distinguished Service Cross; Distinguished Flying Cross; Purple Heart

Lieutenant Colonel Boyd David "Buzz" Wagner (October 26, 1916 – November 29, 1942) was an American aviator and the first United States Army Air Forces (USAAF) fighter ace of World War II.

== Early life ==
Wagner was born October 26, 1916, in Emeigh, Cambria County, Pennsylvania, the son of Boyd M. and Elizabeth M. Moody Wagner. He grew up in Nanty-Glo, near Johnstown, and studied aeronautical engineering at the University of Pittsburgh for three years before joining the Army Air Corps.

== Military career ==
Wagner completed flight training in June 1938 and was assigned to duty in the Philippines with the 24th Pursuit Group. He was soon given command of the 17th Pursuit Squadron.

He was nicknamed "Buzz" because it was said he could buzz the camouflage off a hangar roof.

Wagner was a first lieutenant commanding the 17th Pursuit Squadron stationed at Nichols Field on December 8, 1941, when the first Japanese air attacks struck the Philippines. On December 12, Wagner took off in a Curtiss P-40 on a solo reconnaissance mission over Aparri, where he was attacked by Japanese Mitsubishi A6M Zero fighters. He dove away from the attacking planes and then returned and shot down two of them. He was attacked by more Zeros as he strafed a nearby Japanese airfield. He destroyed two of the planes before returning to Clark Field.

On December 17, he led an attack on a Japanese airstrip near Vigan, with Lieutenants Allison W. Strauss and Russell M. Church Jr. Church who was killed in the attack and posthumously received the Distinguished Service Cross. Wagner and Strauss continued the strafing attack on the airfield, damaging and destroying numerous Japanese planes. A sole Japanese Zero took off and attacked Wagner's plane, but he chopped his throttle and caused the Zero to overshoot his plane. Once in position behind the Zero, Wagner was able to shoot it down, becoming the first USAAF ace of World War II and earning a Distinguished Service Cross.

At least one source states that Wagner's first five kills were not Zeros, but were IJAAF Nakajima Ki-27 "Nate" fighter planes. This source does confirm his later kills were reported as Zeros, but were impossible to verify from Japanese records.

Attacking the Japanese again at Vigan on December 22, his plane was struck by enemy fire and he was wounded by glass splinters which struck his face and eyes. He returned to base safely and evacuated to Australia in January 1942.

Wagner was promoted to lieutenant colonel and assigned in April to the 8th Fighter Group in New Guinea flying the Bell P-39. At the time, he was the youngest lieutenant colonel in the US Army. On April 30, 1942, he shot down three Zeros, bringing his air-to-air kill total to eight.

It was decided that Wagner's experience and knowledge would be more valuable back in the U.S., training fighter pilots and as a liaison to the Curtiss P-40 plant in Buffalo, New York, to help engineers improve the P-40's combat performance. Despite his protests at being pulled out of combat, he was sent home to the United States.

== Death ==
On a routine flight in a P-40K from Eglin Field, Florida to Maxwell Field, Alabama on November 29, 1942, Wagner's plane disappeared. After an extensive search, what was left of the P-40 and Wagner's remains were found almost six weeks later in January 1943, 25 miles (40 km) east of Eglin. The cause of the crash, if known, was never revealed.

Wagner's partial remains were returned to Johnstown, Pa for burial. An estimated 15,000 to 20,000 mourners attended his funeral at Grandview Cemetery, Johnstown, Pa in January 1943. Both Time and Life covered the event.

After five years of research, retired Air Force Colonel Jim Moschgat rediscovered what he believed to be the crash site of Wagner's plane in Florida and found artifacts that tentatively confirmed the crash site was the correct one. Human remains were found at the site in 2008. In 2010, the remains were confirmed as being Lieutenant Colonel Wagner's. These additional remains were buried with full military honors, to include a fly over by the U.S. Air Force at the Grandview Cemetery, Johnstown, Pennsylvania

== Honors ==
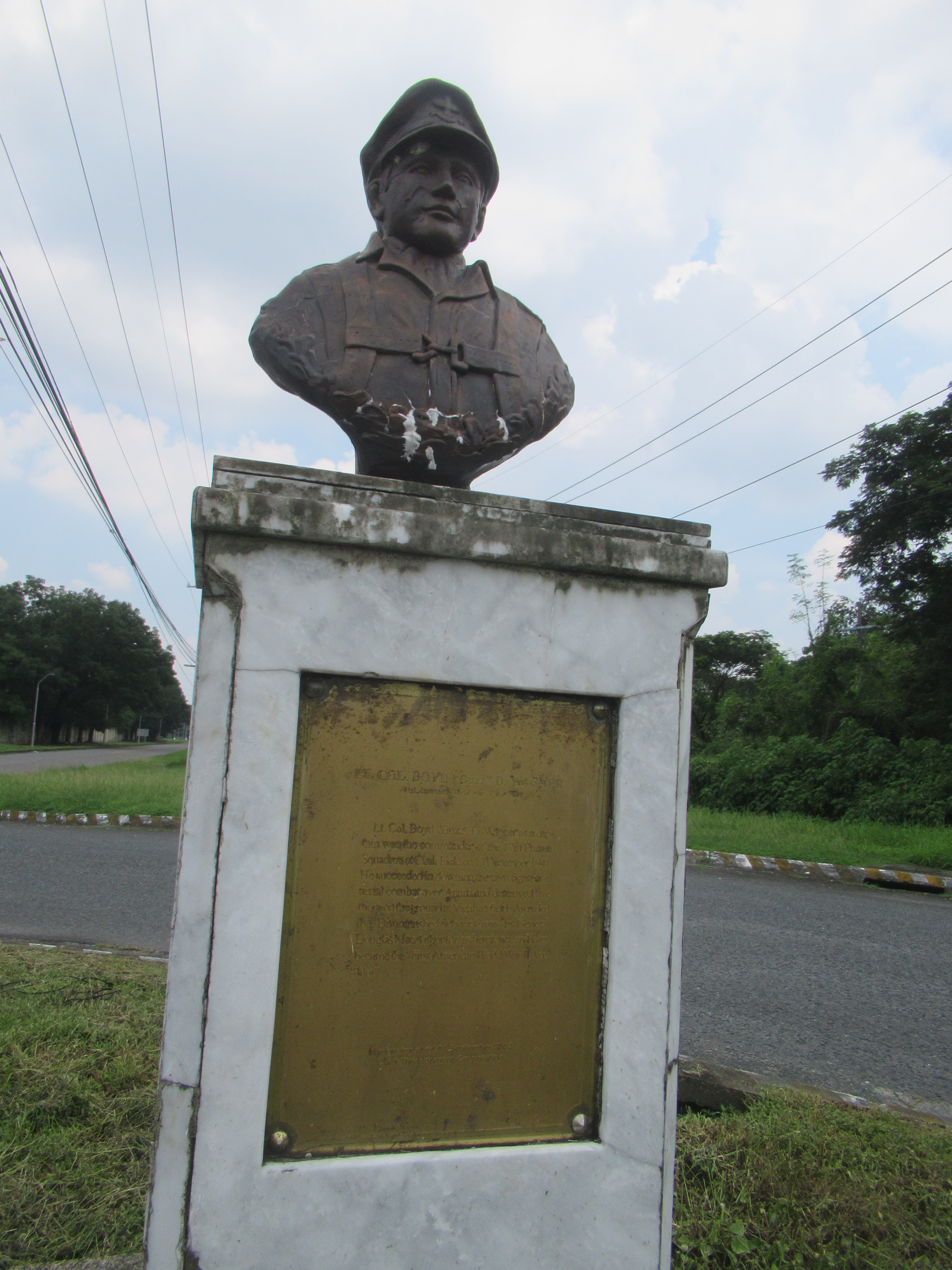
Original Hangars and Flightline - Thirteenth Air Force (Clark Freeport Zone)

United States Army Air Forces pilot badge
Distinguished Service Cross	Distinguished Flying Cross	
Purple Heart	American Defense Service Medal with service star	American Campaign Medal
Asiatic-Pacific Campaign Medal with three bronze campaign stars	World War II Victory Medal	Philippine Defense Medal

Army Presidential Unit Citation with bronze oak leaf cluster	Philippine Presidential Unit Citation

=== Distinguished Service Cross citation ===
For extraordinary heroism in action near Vigan, Abra, Philippine Islands, on December 16, 1941. While leading a reconnaissance mission Lieutenant Wagner left one airplane of his formation above a hostile airfield to continue observation and with a companion drove through heavy enemy anti-aircraft fire to obtain vital information. Observing about twenty-five hostile airplanes on the landing strip he dove directly on them releasing six fragmentation bombs and making several direct hits. In spite of being left unsupported due to the destruction of the accompanying airplane he continued his attack sweeping the hostile airplanes on the ground five times with machine gun fire and setting fire to the enemy's fuel supply before returning to report the accomplishment of his mission.

Two schools at Clark Air Base were named in honor of Boyd Wagner: Wagner High School and Wagner Middle School.

== See also ==
- History of Clark Air Base
- List of solved missing person cases
- List of World War II flying aces
