= Riverside, Pennsylvania =

Borough in Pennsylvania, US

- Borough
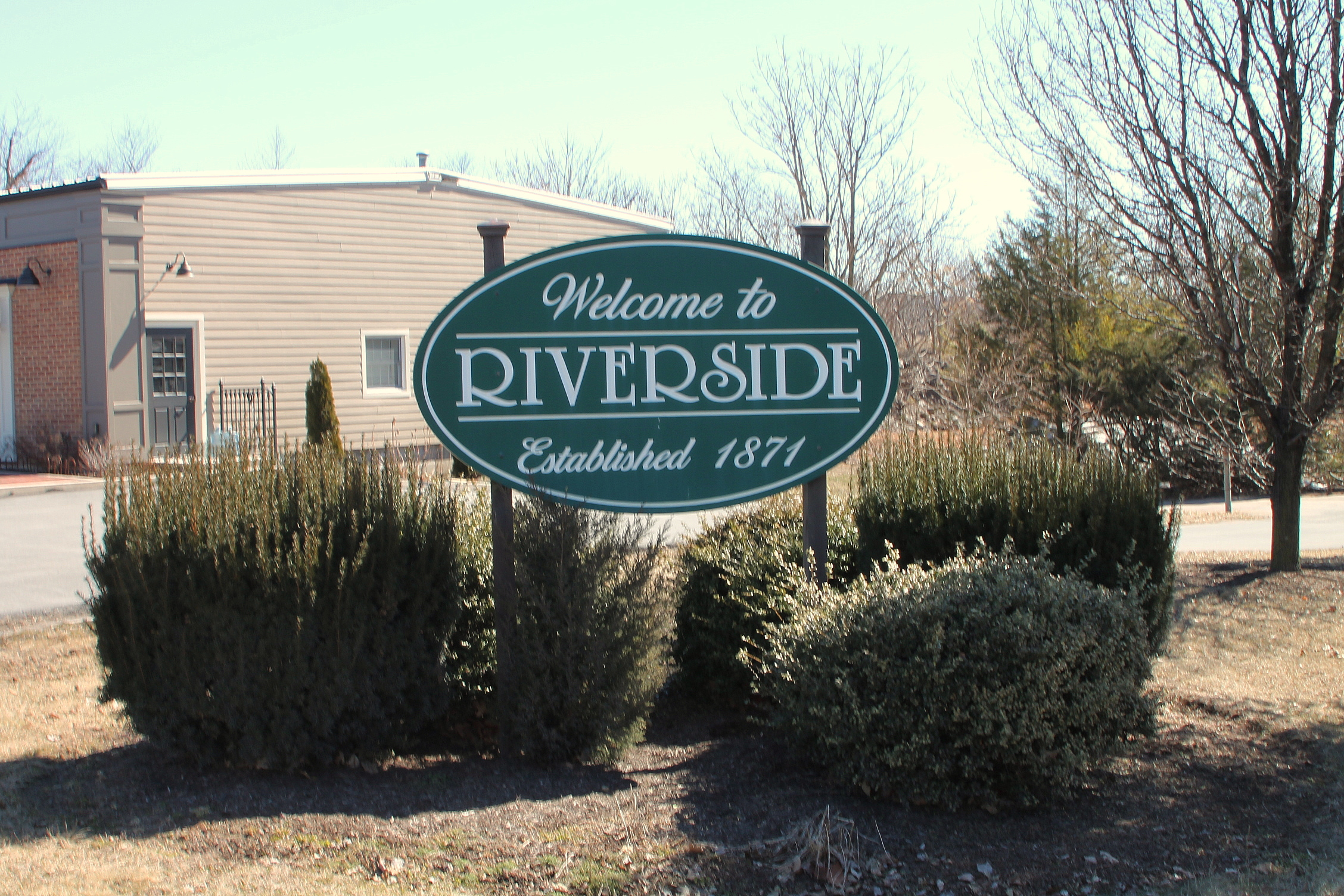
- Welcome sign in Riverside

- Location of Riverside in Northumberland County, Pennsylvania.
- Coordinates: 40°57′13″N 76°38′06″W
- Country: United States
- State: Pennsylvania
- County: Northumberland
- Incorporated: 1871

Government
  - Type: Borough Council
  - Mayor: Todd Oberdorf (as of Feb. 2025)

Area
  - Total: 5.47 sq mi (14.17 km^{2})
  - Land: 4.94 sq mi (12.79 km^{2})
  - Water: 0.53 sq mi (1.37 km^{2})
- Elevation (benchhmark at borough center): 500 ft (150 m)
- Highest elevation (hill at south end of borough): 940 ft (290 m)
- Lowest elevation (Susquehanna River): 440 ft (130 m)

Population (2020)
  - Total: 2,040
  - Density: 412.9/sq mi (159.44/km^{2})
- Time zone: UTC-5 (Eastern (EST))
  - Summer (DST): UTC-4 (EDT)
- Zip code: 17868
- Area code: 570
- FIPS code: 42-65112
- Website: Riverside borough

Riverside is a borough in Northumberland County, Pennsylvania, United States. As of the 2020 census, Riverside had a population of 2,040. The current mayor is John LaMotte.

== History ==
Riverside was established in 1871.

== Geography ==
Riverside is located at 40°57′13″N 76°38′06″W.

According to the United States Census Bureau, the borough has a total area of 5.3 square miles (14 km^{2}), of which 4.8 square miles (12 km^{2}) is land and 0.5 square miles (1.3 km^{2}) (8.85%) is water.

Riverside lies on the south side of the North Branch of Susquehanna River, hence the name. Riverside is connected to Danville by the Factory Street Bridge.

== Demographics ==
Historical population
Census	Pop.	Note	%±
1880	336		—
1890	394		17.3%
1900	418		6.1%
1910	429		2.6%
1920	411		−4.2%
1930	447		8.8%
1940	501		12.1%
1950	524		4.6%
1960	1,580		201.5%
1970	1,905		20.6%
1980	2,266		19.0%
1990	1,991		−12.1%
2000	1,861		−6.5%
2010	1,932		3.8%
2020	2,040		5.6%
U.S. Decennial Census

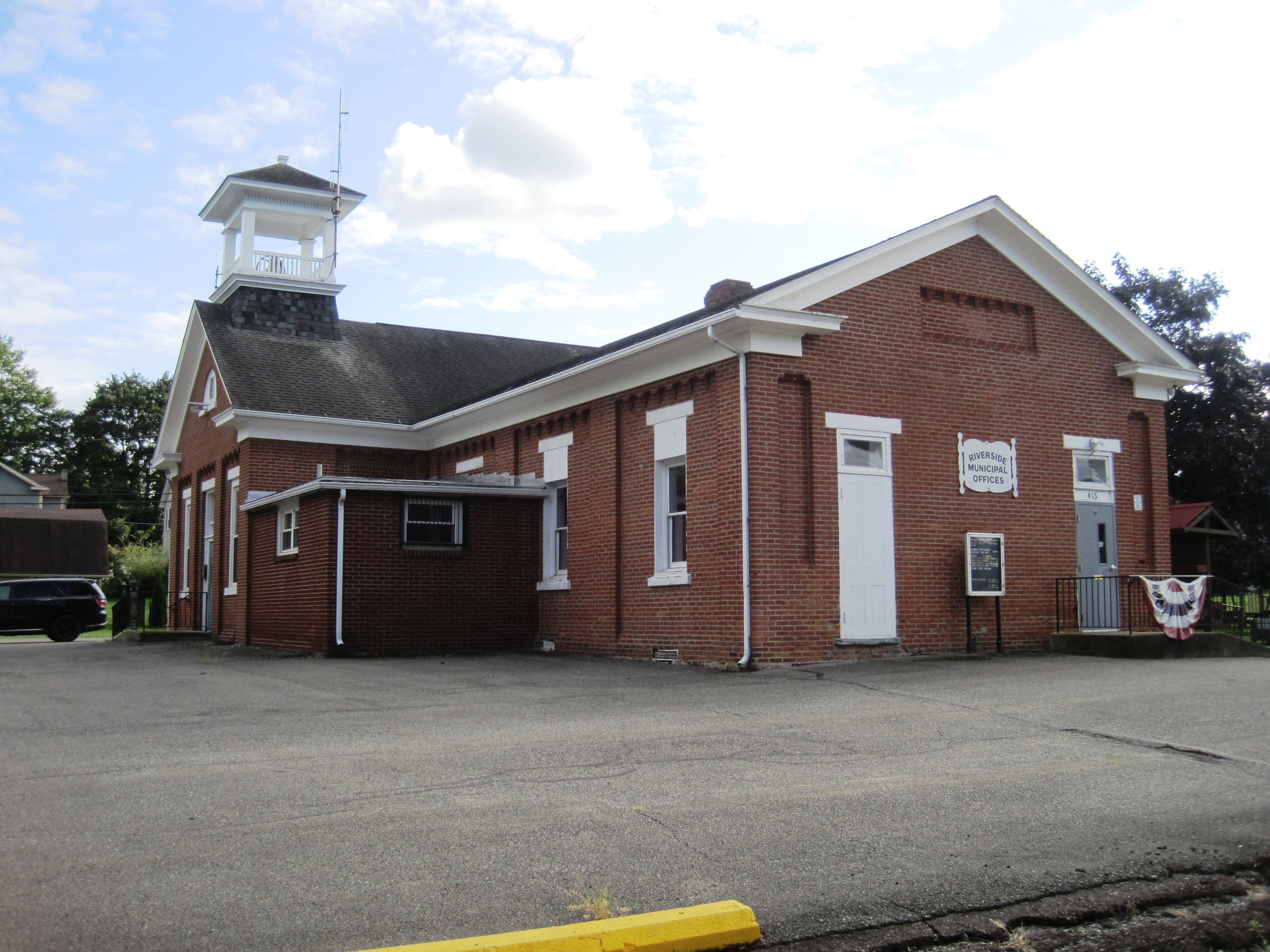
Riverside Borough Hall

As of the census of 2000, there were 1,861 people, 760 households, and 561 families residing in the borough. The population density was 384.4 inhabitants per square mile (148.4/km^{2}). There were 799 housing units at an average density of 165.0 per square mile (63.7/km^{2}). The racial makeup of the borough was 99.19% White, 0.05% African American, 0.21% Asian, 0.11% from other races, and 0.43% from two or more races. Hispanic or Latino of any race were 0.64% of the population.

There were 760 households, out of which 30.5% had children under the age of 18 living with them, 65.0% were married couples living together, 7.0% had a female householder with no husband present, and 26.1% were non-families. 23.2% of all households were made up of individuals, and 10.1% had someone living alone who was 65 years of age or older. The average household size was 2.44 and the average family size was 2.88.

In the borough the population was spread out, with 22.6% under the age of 18, 5.1% from 18 to 24, 27.5% from 25 to 44, 28.9% from 45 to 64, and 16.0% who were 65 years of age or older. The median age was 42 years. For every 100 females, there were 94.3 males. For every 100 females age 18 and over, there were 88.6 males.

The median income for a household in the borough was $45,469, and the median income for a family was $55,515. Males had a median income of $38,929 versus $25,556 for females. The per capita income for the borough was $23,732. About 5.7% of families and 7.1% of the population were below the poverty line, including 10.4% of those under age 18 and 9.2% of those age 65 or over.
