= Carl E. Stotz Memorial Little League Bridge =

Bridge in Pennsylvania, United States

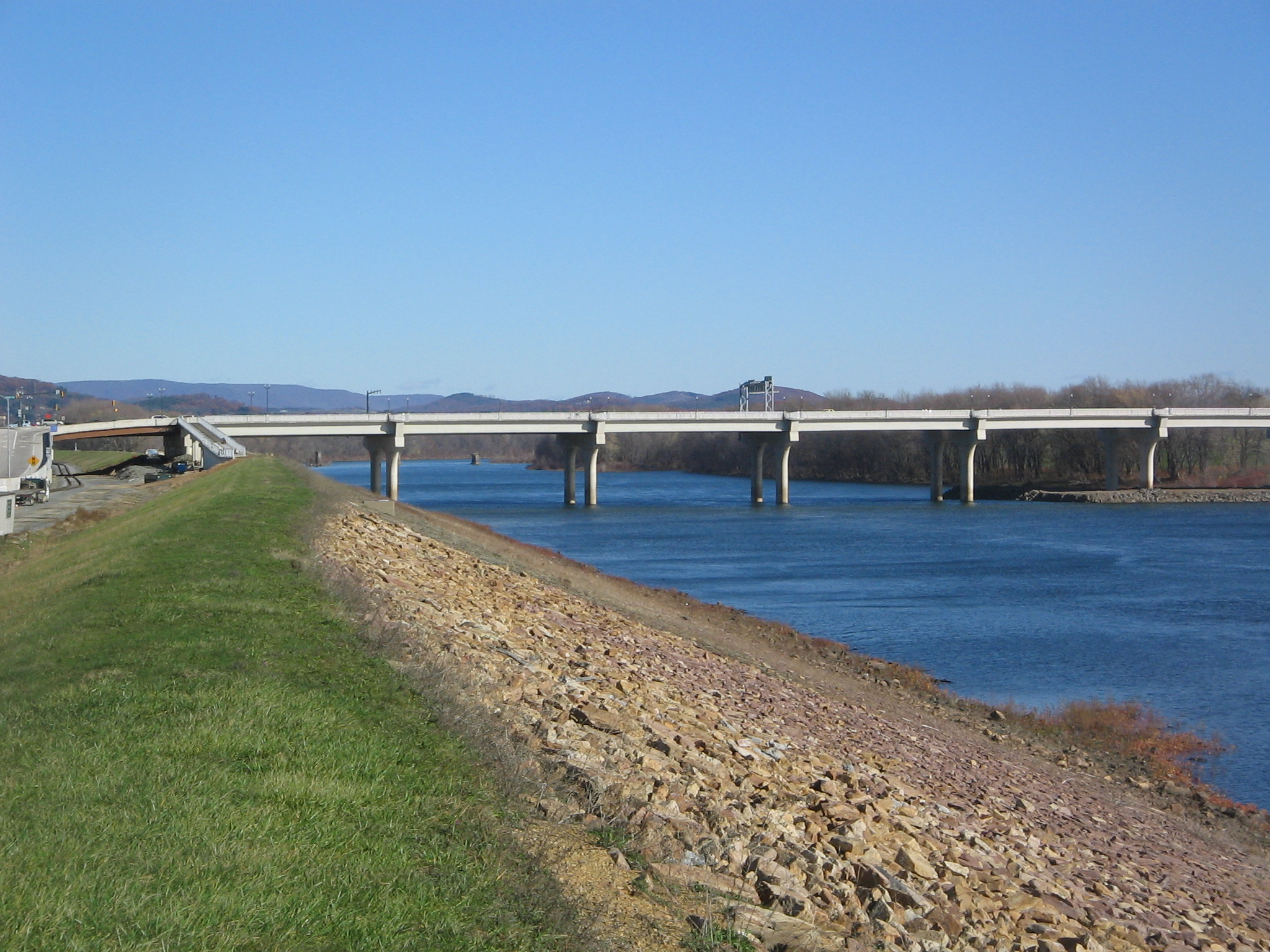
- Carl E. Stotz Memorial Little League Bridge over the West Branch Susquehanna River, from the west
- Coordinates: 41.23742°N 76.997674°W
- Carries: 4 lanes of US 15 pedestrian walkway
- Crosses: West Branch Susquehanna River
- Locale: Williamsport, Pennsylvania
- Maintained by: PennDOT

History
- Opened: October 18, 2007

Location
- Interactive map of Carl E. Stotz Memorial Little League Bridge

The Carl E. Stotz Memorial Little League Bridge, formerly known as the Market Street Bridge, carries approximately 27,700 vehicles a day on U.S. Route 15 over the West Branch Susquehanna River between Williamsport and South Williamsport in Lycoming County, Pennsylvania, in the United States. It is the seventh bridge on the site and was built at a cost of over $60,000,000.

In October 2007 the new northbound bridge over the river and the new "direct connect" single-point urban interchange with Interstate 180 was completed and opened to traffic. The overall project, which included the reconstruction of Via Bella, was completed in summer 2008.

== History ==
The Carl E. Stotz Memorial Little League Bridge is the seventh bridge to span the West Branch Susquehanna River between Williamsport and South Williamsport at Market Street since the 1840s. It was built to replace the sixth Market Street Bridge, a steel deck structure which the Pennsylvania Department of Transportation originally intended to rehabilitate and widen. When this proved to be unfeasible, plans for a new bridge were put into place.

The first permanent bridge between was constructed beginning in 1844 and completed on July 5, 1849 (prior to its completion ferry boat service was available). This first Market Street Bridge, a wooden covered bridge, cost $23,797 to construct. It was owned by a private corporation, operated it as a toll bridge, and stood until March 17, 1865, when it was destroyed by a flood that left 90 percent of Williamsport underwater.

The second Market Street Bridge opened on December 1, 1865, and was a wire suspension bridge built for $58,068. The bridge was dismantled in 1886. It was also owned by a private corporation. The bridge, redesigned by Alfred P. Boller in 1886, was apparently a unique looking structure that caused some embarrassment to the owners.

The third Market Street Bridge was built in 1886 at a cost of $30,000 to $40,000. It was an iron truss bridge built by the Berlin Iron Company of Connecticut. It was partially destroyed by a flood on June 1, 1889, when the bridge was forced off its piers by timber that was swept down the river. This came from the Susquehanna Boom, part of the lumbering industry that helped make Williamsport one of the wealthiest cities in the world during the late 1800s.

The fourth Market Street Bridge was built upon the piers of the third bridge, using parts of the third truss bridge that had been swept downstream in 1889. The fourth bridge was opened in 1890 at a cost of $38,000, and was purchased in 1891 by the Lycoming County commissioners for $113,700, who declared to be free of tolls. Improvements to the bridge included raising it by 5 feet (1.5 m) and adding a sidewalk for pedestrian traffic. The fourth Market Street Bridge was destroyed by a flood on May 21, 1894.

The West Branch Susquehanna River was spanned by a fifth Market Street Bridge from 1894 until 1949. The two lane truss bridge was built by the Crofton Bridge and Manufacturing Company of Croton, New York. The bridge was nearly destroyed in 1909 when a discarded cigarette set a fire among the wooden planks of the bridge. Market Street Bridge number five was dynamited into the river and dismantled in 1949.

Market Street Bridge number six was a steel deck bridge. Construction was completed in 1951 at a cost of over $3,000,000. The sixth bridge was constructed by George Vang Inc. of Pittsburgh, Pennsylvania. It was dynamited and dismantled in 2007.

== Construction ==
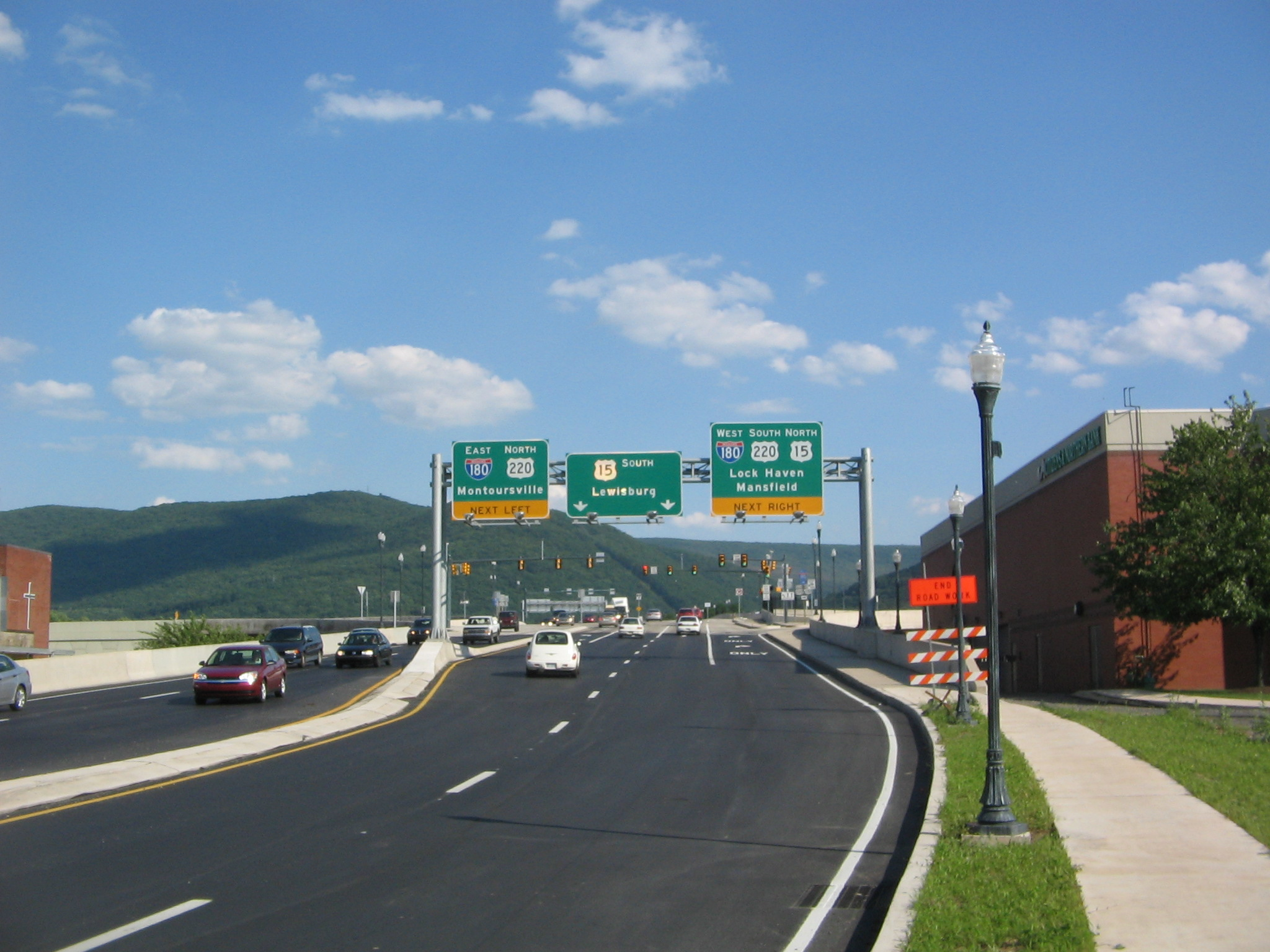
View south from Williamsport on Carl E. Stotz Memorial Little League Bridge, showing Single Point Urban Interchange

The Pennsylvania Department of Transportation announced its plans for the seventh Market Street Bridge in the year 2000. A groundbreaking ceremony for the new bridge was held on May 7, 2004, with the actual construction beginning on May 10. The original estimated cost of the project was $60,000,000. The new bridge was built as two spans, with the southbound span constructed first, just west (upstream) of the sixth bridge. The southbound bridge was opened to traffic on July 11, 2006. In August 2006, the old Market Street bridge was demolished.

After the demolition of the old bridge, the southbound bridge carried traffic in both directions as single lanes separated by a temporary concrete barrier. Meanwhile, the new northbound span was built in the same location as the old bridge, just east (downstream) of the southbound span. The northbound bridge opened to traffic on October 10, 2007, originally as a single lane. There were two lanes of traffic in both directions on the bridge by October 15, 2007, the day that three of the four "direct connect" ramps between Interstate 180 and the bridge officially opened. The traffic lights controlling the new single-point urban interchange were activated the same day, and the last ramp, from the bridge to westbound I-180, opened by October 18. (The ramp from eastbound I-180 to the bridge had been open over a year, but only to traffic then going south.)

The new Market Street Bridge was officially dedicated on October 18, 2007, at a ribbon-cutting ceremony with speeches by Mayor Mary B. Wolf of Williamsport, Lycoming County Commissioner Rebecca Burke, State Senator Roger A. Madigan, State Representative Steven W Capelli, and others. The bridge was renamed in August 2011 to honor Carl Stotz, the founder of Little League Baseball. In addition to the river, Carl E. Stotz Memorial Little League Bridge crosses Via Bella, the street parallel to the river, I-180, and the Lycoming Valley Railroad (LVRR) on the Williamsport side, and the Norfolk Southern Railway on the South Williamsport side. Participants in the ribbon-cutting ceremony rode to it in restored passenger cars on the LVRR line. The LVRR track was moved several feet south to accommodate the new bridge.

As of summer 2008, roadwork on the project was complete, but some final touches were still planned for the site. The Court Street roundabout will be the site of a negative relief sculpture depicting scenes from the history of Williamsport and Lycoming County, and will serve as a "welcome portal" to the city. The new bridge has pedestrian ramps to the flood control levee on the north bank of the river. This will be developed into a "river walk" attraction. The final cost of the new bridge and associated construction is expected to be $67 million, about 12% over the original budget.

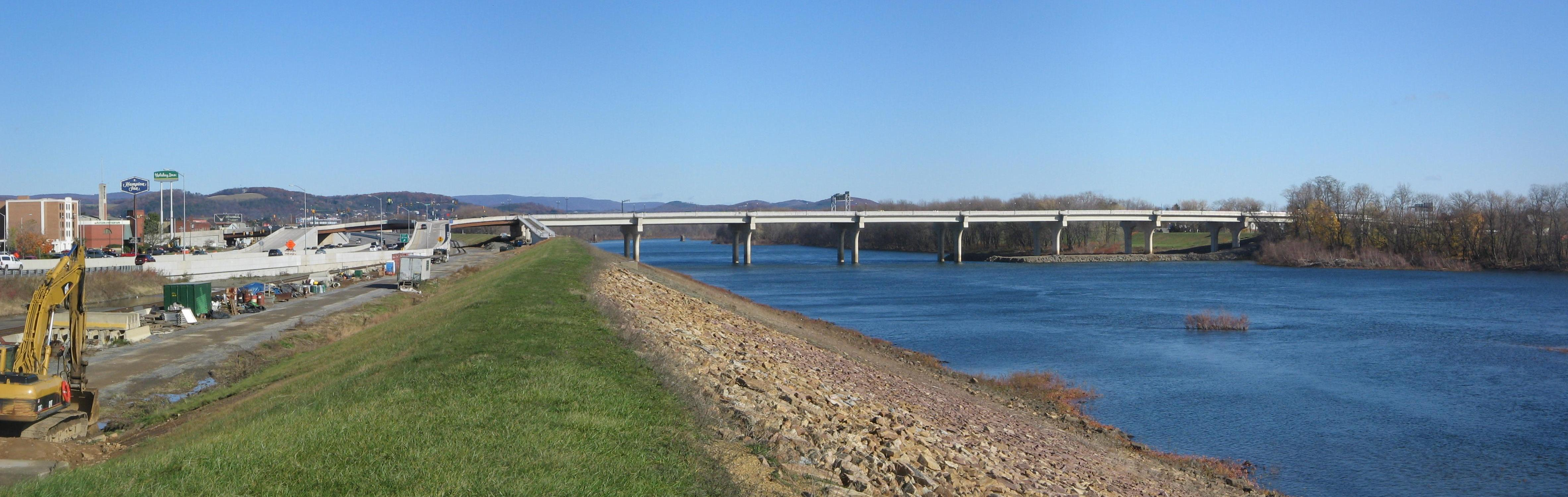
Panoramic view looking east to the new Carl E. Stotz Memorial Little League Bridge from the flood control levee on the north bank of the West Branch Susquehanna River: Williamsport, Via Bella, eastbound ramp from I-180 to the bridge, I-180, westbound ramp from the bridge to I-180 (ramps are for the single point urban interchange), the Lycoming Valley Railroad tracks, and the pedestrian ramp to the flood control levee are at left, South Williamsport is at right.

== See also ==
- List of crossings of the Susquehanna River
