= Philadelphia & Reading Railroad Bridge (Harrisburg, Pennsylvania) =

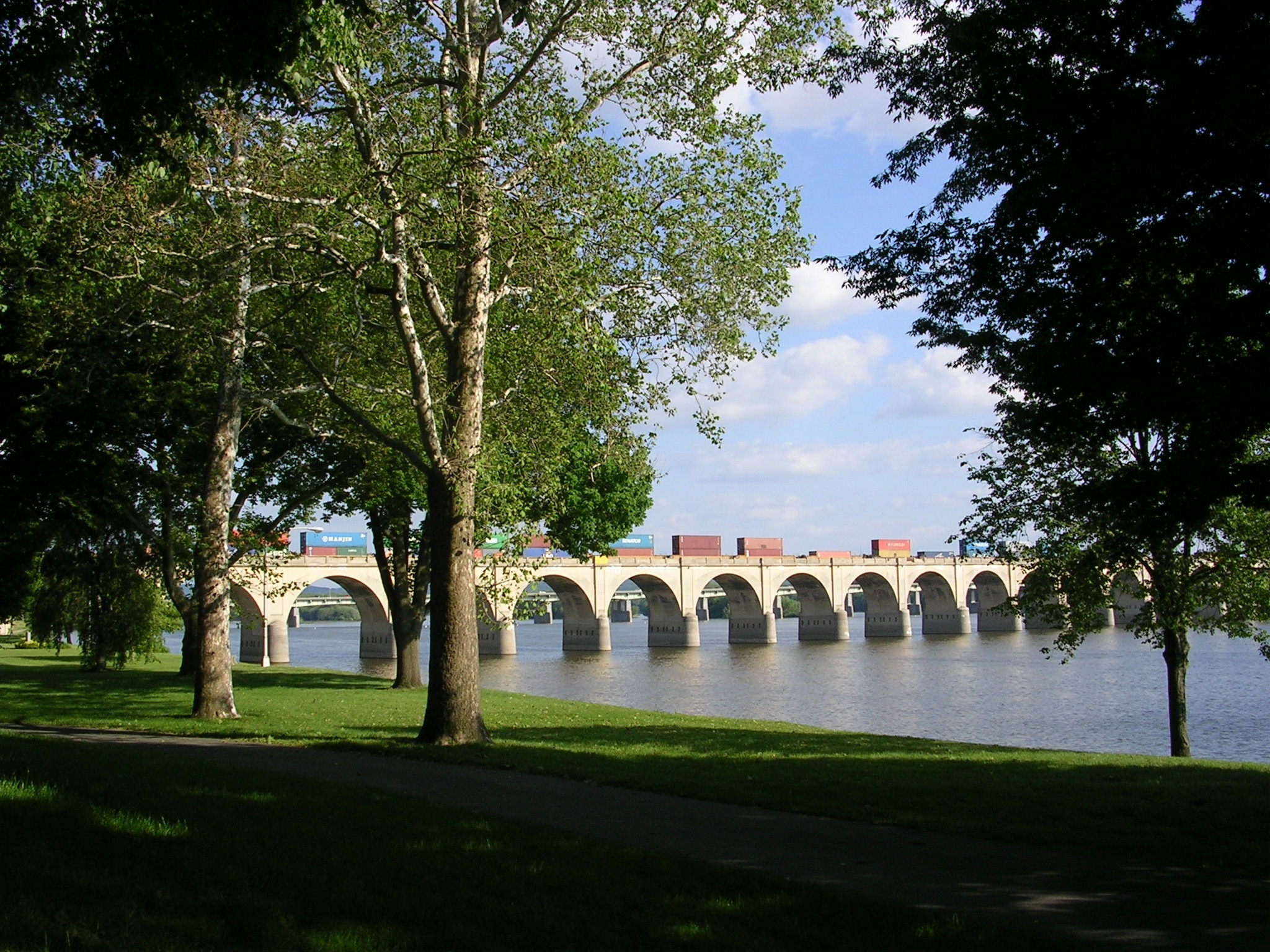
- Coordinates: 40°14′57″N 76°52′58″W
- Carries: Norfolk Southern Railway
- Crosses: Susquehanna River
- Locale: Lemoyne, Pennsylvania and Harrisburg, Pennsylvania
- Maintained by: Norfolk Southern Railway

Characteristics
- Design: Concrete arch bridge

History
- Opened: 1924

Location
- Interactive map of Philadelphia & Reading Railroad Bridge

The Philadelphia & Reading Railroad Bridge carries Norfolk Southern rail lines across the Susquehanna River between Lemoyne, Pennsylvania and Harrisburg, Pennsylvania. Some of its concrete piers encase stone masonry piers from an earlier truss bridge on this site, completed in 1891 by the Philadelphia, Harrisburg and Pittsburgh Railroad, which was then acquired by the Philadelphia and Reading Railroad to connect its Harrisburg and Lurgan lines. The current structure was constructed from 1920 to 1924 by replacing the trusses with concrete arches one track at a time. The bridge has fifty-one concrete arches, three more than the nearby Rockville Bridge.

== History ==
In Harrisburg, the first bridge over the Susquehanna was built at the beginning of the 19th century on the site of today's Market Street Bridge. This led over the river island City Island, which is today surrounded by six bridges, including two railway bridges, with only the Philadelphia and Reading Railroad Bridge is used. Their predecessor structure was built between 1890 and 1891 by the Philadelphia, Harrisburg and Pittsburgh Railroad (PH&P), an association of several smaller railway companies that Harrisburg associated with about 75 kilometers southwest Shippensburg. The PH&P was later acquired by the Philadelphia and Reading Railroad (P&R), which thus made the connection of their rail network to the Western Maryland Railway in the southwest and strengthened their position in the competition with the Pennsylvania Railroad (PRR). The PRR controlled until then all railway bridges over the Susquehanna in Pennsylvania below Selinsgrove, as well as the upstream Cumberland Valley Railroad Bridge and Rockville Bridge.

In the immediate vicinity of the Philadelphia and Reading Railroad Bridge - upriver on the Lemoyne side - are some pillars of a never-completed railway bridge of the South Pennsylvania Railroad. Planned in the midst of a fierce power struggle between the then major railway companies, construction of that bridge was halted in 1885 in the wake of a compromise negotiated by the banker JP Morgan.

The originally single-track P&R bridge consisted of 23 wrought-iron truss girders with a length of 45.5 meters each, whereby the pillars of sandstone had already been designed for a later twin-rail expansion. Since such an expansion never came about, the one-sided load on the pillars over time led to their damage. With the emergence of more powerful and heavier steam locomotives at the beginning of the 20th century, the maximum load capacity of the bridge was reached. The P & R decided therefore for the conversion to a double-railed arch bridge made of reinforced concrete.

The reconstruction of the bridge took place in the years 1920 to 1924. First, new concrete was built between the original pillars, then reinforced the old sandstone brick by a concrete coating and finally all pillars connected by 46 sheets of reinforced concrete, where one after the other always a complete Half of the bridge between the two banks was built. To ensure the ongoing operation of about 75 trains daily, used in the first conversion phase, the track on the old trusses. From July 1922 it was then used the first track on the downstream newly created first half of the arch bridge and continued with the construction of the second half.

A later extension of the bridge on the Harrisburg side increased the total number of bows to 51. The exact date of this extension is unknown. However, it took place at the latest in the 1940s, as images from this decade prove.

As a result of the bankruptcy of several railway companies in the 1970s - including the successors of the P&R (Reading Company) and the PRR (Penn Central) - 1976, the state rescue company Conrail was formed, in their possession of the Susquehanna railway bridges went over. In 1999, Conrail was acquired by Norfolk Southern Railway and CSX Transportation. The Philadelphia and Reading Railroad Bridge went to the Norfolk Southern Railway, which it uses for its rail freight service between Harrisburg in Pennsylvania and Hagerstown in Maryland (Lurgan Branch), but also partially approved use by CSX Transportation.

== Description ==
The 1924 completed part of the arch bridge consists of 45 arches with a span of just over 23 m (75 ft) and a final arc on the west bank (Lemoyne side) with 21.5 m (71 ft) (each measured from the center of the arrow). This is followed by the abutment a 21 m-long (69 ft) girder bridge with solid wall girders. The total length of the original bridge is about 1,090 m (3,580 ft). Later, the bridge was extended by five arches of similar span on the east bank (Harrisburg side) and thus extended by about 100 m (330 ft). From the west to the east bank, the bridge has a gradient of 7 ‰, which reduces the height of the track level above normal water level from 24 m (79 ft) to 17 m (56 ft). The bridge was designed to guarantee a minimum clear height of 8.7 m (29 ft), based on the highest known flood level at that time.

== See also ==
- List of bridges documented by the Historic American Engineering Record in Pennsylvania
- List of crossings of the Susquehanna River
