= Oakland, Susquehanna County, Pennsylvania =

Borough in Pennsylvania, US

Oakland, Pennsylvania
- Borough
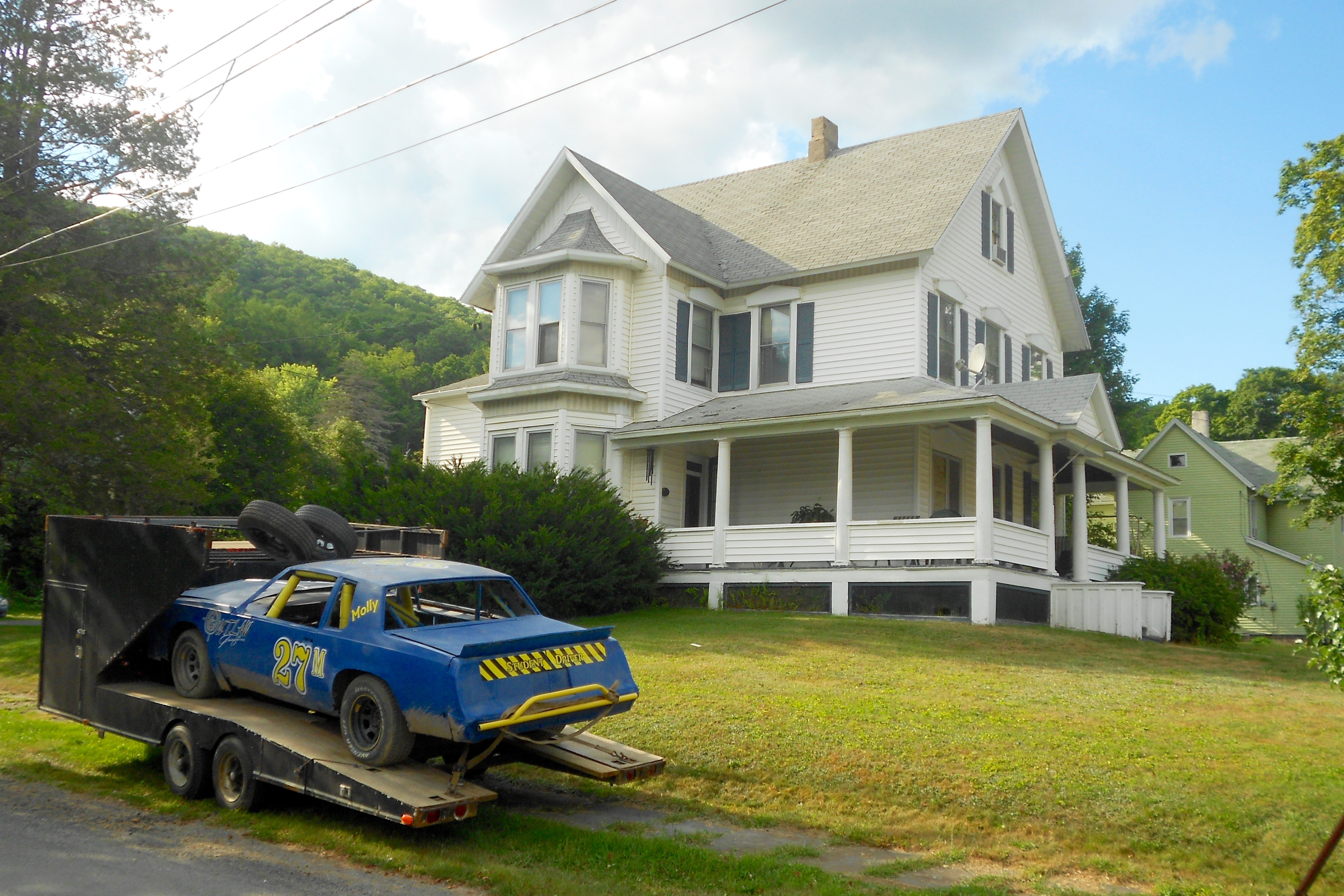
- House and stock car

- Location of Oakland in Susquehanna County, Pennsylvania.

- Location of Oakland in Pennsylvania Oakland (the United States)
- Coordinates: 41°56′58″N 75°36′30″W
- Country: United States
- State: Pennsylvania
- County: Susquehanna
- Established: 1884

Government
  - Mayor: Randy Glover

Area
  - Total: 0.50 sq mi (1.30 km^{2})
  - Land: 0.45 sq mi (1.16 km^{2})
  - Water: 0.058 sq mi (0.15 km^{2}) auto%

Population (2020)
  - Total: 563
  - Density: 1,261.7/sq mi (487.14/km^{2})
- Time zone: UTC-5 (Eastern (EST))
  - Summer (DST): UTC-4 (EDT)
- ZIP Code: 18847
- Area code: 570
- FIPS code: 42-56008
- GNIS feature ID: 1215616
- Website: oaklandborough.com

Oakland is a borough in Susquehanna County, Pennsylvania, United States. The population of Oakland borough was 564 at the 2020 census.

== History ==
Oakland Borough was formed from part of Oakland Township on November 14, 1883. It was originally known as North or West Susquehanna, then Oakland village.

Novelist, essayist, literary critic, and university professor John Gardner, author of Grendel, The Art of Fiction, On Becoming a Novelist etc., died in a motorcycle accident here.

== Geography ==
Oakland is located at 41°56′58″N 75°36′30″W (41.949506, -75.608428).

According to the United States Census Bureau, the borough has a total area of 0.51 square miles (1.3 km^{2}), of which 0.45 square miles (1.2 km^{2}) is land and 0.06 square miles (0.16 km^{2}) (11.76%) is water.

== Demographics ==
Historical population
Census	Pop.	Note	%±
1890	955		—
1900	1,003		5.0%
1910	915		−8.8%
1920	1,120		22.4%
1930	1,040		−7.1%
1940	964		−7.3%
1950	871		−9.6%
1960	889		2.1%
1970	817		−8.1%
1980	734		−10.2%
1990	641		−12.7%
2000	622		−3.0%
2010	616		−1.0%
2020	564		−8.4%
2021 (est.)	562		−0.4%

As of the census of 2010, there were 616 people, 229 households, and 163 families residing in the borough. The population density was 1,368.9 people per square mile (528.5 people/km^{2}). There were 256 housing units at an average density of 568.9 per square mile (219.7/km^{2}). The racial makeup of the borough was 98.4% White, 0.5% African American, 0.6% Asian, and 0.5% from two or more races. Hispanic or Latino of any race were 1.3% of the population.

There were 229 households, out of which 28.8% had children under the age of 18 living with them, 46.7% were married couples living together, 14.4% had a female householder with no husband present, and 28.8% were non-families. 21.4% of all households were made up of individuals, and 7% had someone living alone who was 65 years of age or older. The average household size was 2.69 and the average family size was 3.05.

In the borough the population was spread out, with 24.7% under the age of 18, 63.8% from 18 to 64, and 11.5% who were 65 years of age or older. The median age was 38.7 years.

The median income for a household in the borough was $36,750, and the median income for a family was $40,179. Males had a median income of $28,684 versus $19,643 for females. The per capita income for the borough was $16,352. About 10.6% of families and 11.7% of the population were below the poverty line, including 9% of those under age 18 and 12.3% of those age 65 or over.
