= Market Street =

Market Street may refer to:

== Roads ==
=== Australia ===
- Market Street, Fremantle, Western Australia
- Market Street, Melbourne, Victoria
- Market Street, Sydney, New South Wales

=== England ===
- Market Street, Cambridge
- Market Street, Manchester
- Market Street, Oxford
- Market Street (York)

=== United States ===
- Market Street (Philadelphia), Pennsylvania
- Market Street (San Francisco), California
- Market Street (St. Louis), Missouri
- State Street (Boston), Massachusetts, originally known as Market Street

=== Elsewhere ===
- Market Street, George Town, Penang, Malaysia

== See also ==
- Market Street Bridge (disambiguation)

=== Transit ===
- Market Street Metrolink station, a Manchester light-rail station
- Market Street Railway (nonprofit), organization that supports the operation of the F Market streetcar line in San Francisco
- Market Street Railway (transit operator), commercial streetcar and bus operator in San Francisco
- Market Street subway in San Francisco, California
- Market Street Railway Substation in San Francisco, California
- Market–Frankford Line, rapid transit line in Philadelphia, Pennsylvania

=== Other ===
- Market Street, a Lego building set in the Lego Modular Houses Theme series
- United Supermarkets, a supermarket chain in Texas that contains a division called Market Street
- High Street, the main business street in many British Commonwealth towns
  - High Street (disambiguation)
