= Elmora, Pennsylvania =

Unincorporated community in Pennsylvania, US

Bakerton (Elmora PO), Pennsylvania
- Unincorporated community
- Location within Pennsylvania
- Coordinates: 40°36′06″N 78°44′47″W
- Country: United States
- State: Pennsylvania
- County: Cambria
- Elevation: 1,640 ft (500 m)
- Time zone: UTC-5 (Eastern (EST))
  - Summer (DST): UTC-4 (EDT)
- ZIP code: 15737
- Area code: 814
- GNIS feature ID: 1198318

Bakerton (Elmora PO) is an unincorporated community in the township of West Carroll, Cambria County, Pennsylvania, United States. The community is 4.4 miles (7.1 km) south-southeast of Northern Cambria. Bakerton, is the official town name, but it has an address of Elmora with ZIP code 15737.

== Demographics ==
Historical population
| Census | Pop. | Note | %± |
|---|---|---|---|
| 2023 (est.) | 421 |

The United States Census Bureau defined Elmora as a census designated place (CDP) in 2023.
