= Lynnwood, Luzerne County, Pennsylvania =

Human settlement in Luzerne County, Pennsylvania, United States

Coordinates: 41°14′05″N 75°55′54″W

Lyndwood is an area of Luzerne County, Pennsylvania in the United States of America. It is north of the Wyoming Valley Country Coub.

Notable individuals who have lived in Lyndwood include actor Jerry Orbach.
