= McGees Mills, Pennsylvania =

Unincorporated community in Pennsylvania, US

- Unincorporated community
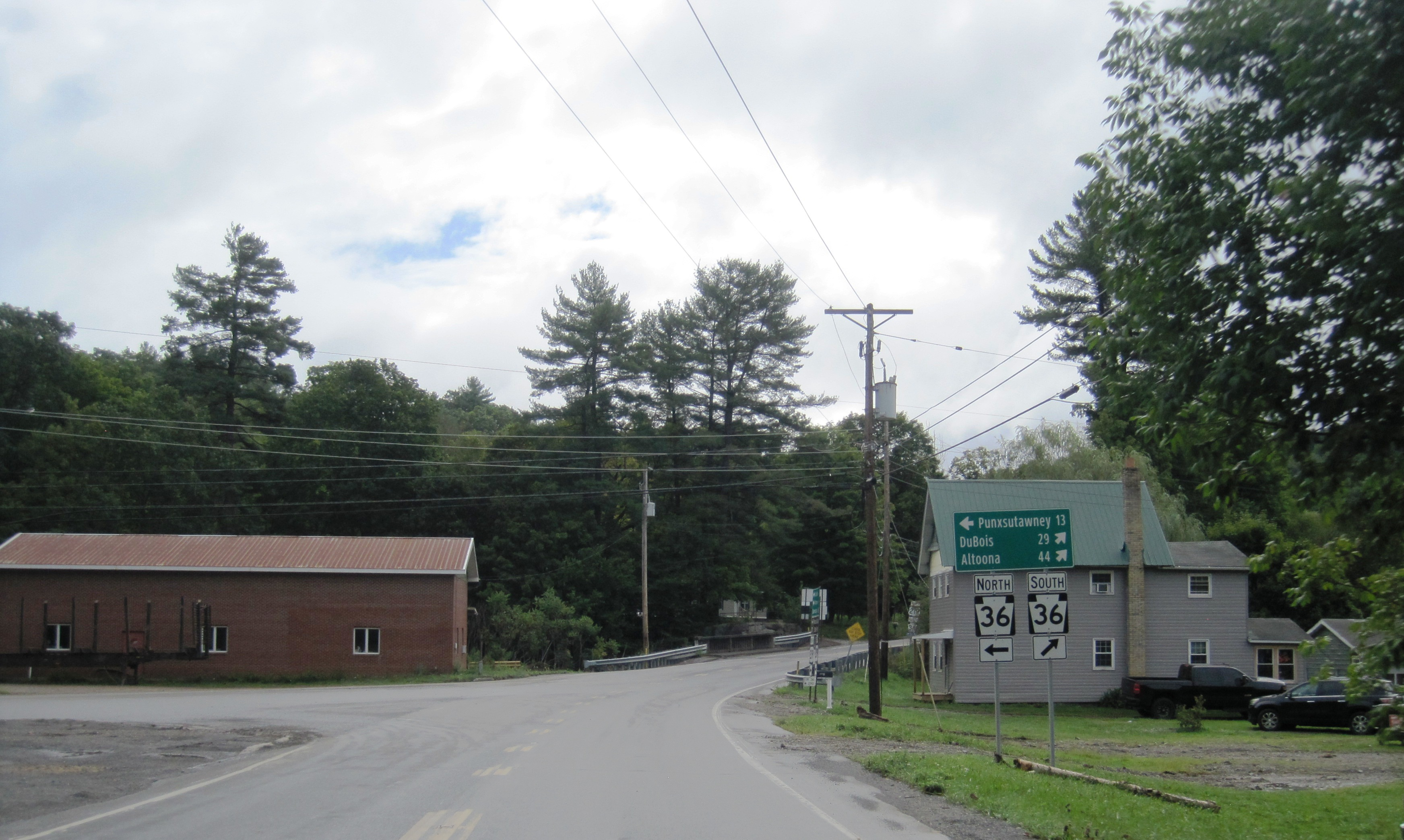
- US 219 northbound at PA 36 in McGees Mills

- Location within Pennsylvania
- Coordinates: 40°52′54″N 78°45′45″W
- Country: United States
- State: Pennsylvania
- County: Clearfield
- Elevation: 1,296 ft (395 m)
- Time zone: UTC-5 (Eastern (EST))
  - Summer (DST): UTC-4 (EDT)
- Area code: 814
- GNIS feature ID: 1180714

McGees Mills is an unincorporated community in Clearfield County, Pennsylvania, United States. A gristmill operated by Henry Holmes McGee eventually resulted in the name. The community is located at the junction of U.S. Route 219 and Pennsylvania Route 36, two miles (3.2 km) west-northwest of Mahaffey. The McGees Mills Covered Bridge crosses the West Branch of the Susquehanna River at McGees Mills.
