= Emeigh, Pennsylvania =

Unincorporated community in Pennsylvania, US

- Unincorporated community
- Location within Pennsylvania
- Coordinates: 40°41′41″N 78°47′13″W
- Country: United States
- State: Pennsylvania
- County: Cambria
- Elevation: 1,503 ft (458 m)
- Time zone: UTC-5 (Eastern (EST))
  - Summer (DST): UTC-4 (EDT)
- ZIP code: 15738
- Area code: 814
- GNIS feature ID: 1174212

Emeigh is an unincorporated community in Cambria County, Pennsylvania, United States. The community is located to the east of U.S. Route 219, 2.5 miles (4.0 km) north of Northern Cambria. Emeigh has a post office with ZIP code 15738, which opened on June 15, 1905.

== Demographics ==
Historical population
Census	Pop.	Note	%±
2023 (est.)	260

The United States Census Bureau defined Emeigh as a census designated place (CDP) in 2023.

== Notable people ==
- Duffy Daugherty, American football coach
- Boyd Wagner, WWII Ace
