= West Carroll Township, Pennsylvania =

Township in Pennsylvania, US

Coordinates: 40°36′00″N 78°44′29″W

- Township
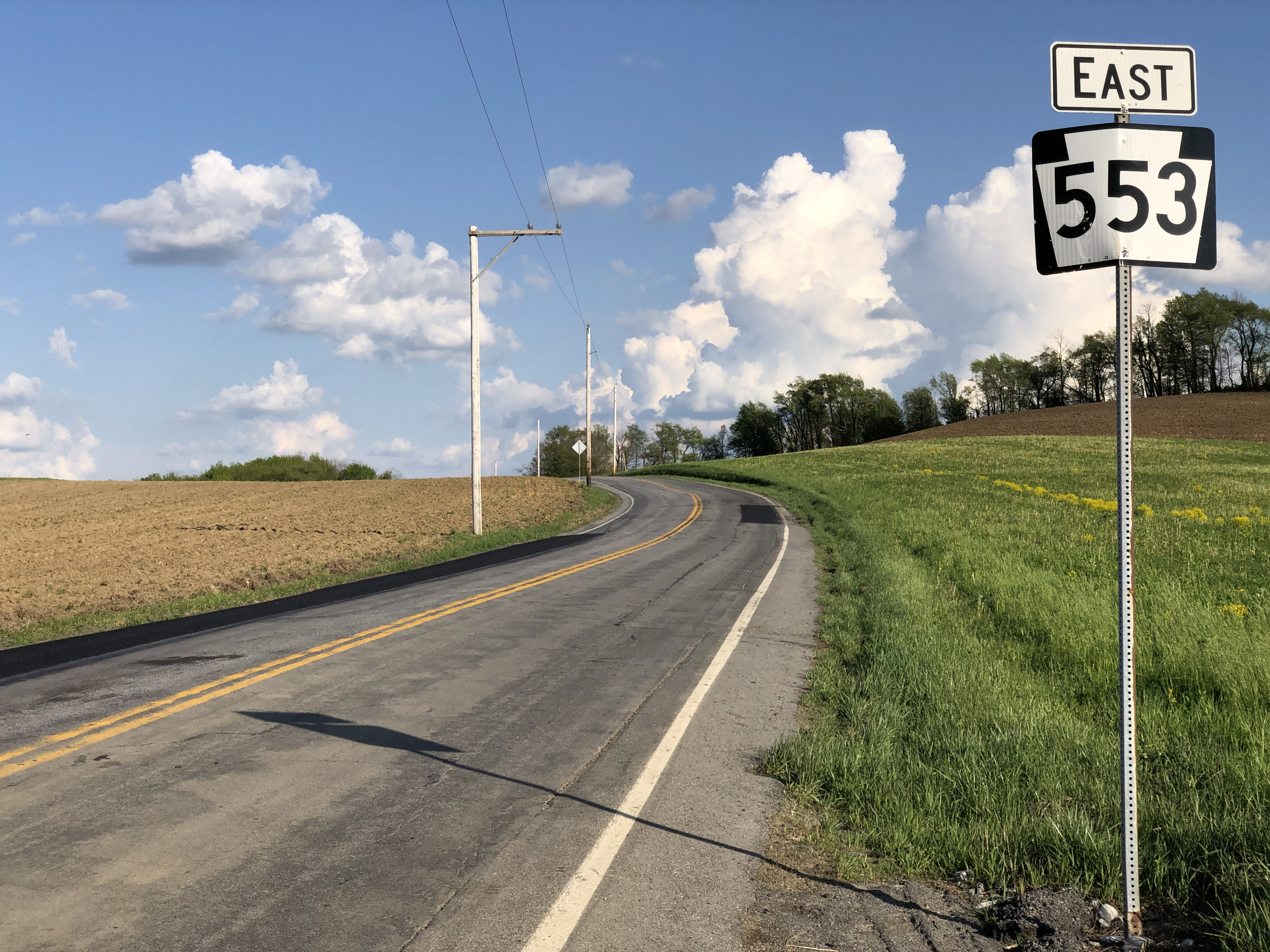
- PA 553 in West Carroll Township

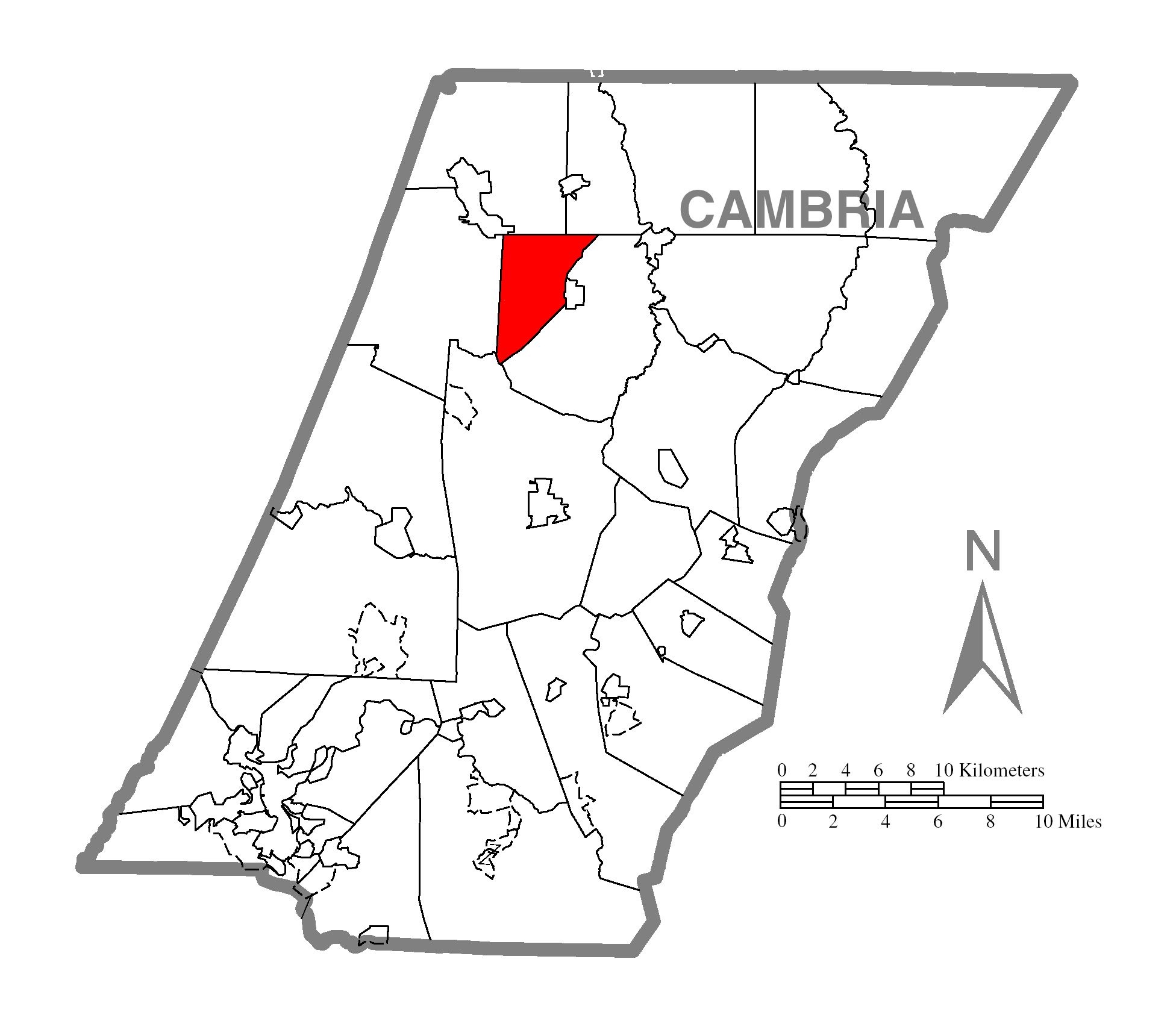
- Map of Cambria County, Pennsylvania highlighting West Carroll Township

- Map of Cambria County, Pennsylvania
- Country: United States
- State: Pennsylvania
- County: Cambria
- Incorporated: 1910

Area
  - Total: 10.72 sq mi (27.76 km^{2})
  - Land: 10.71 sq mi (27.74 km^{2})
  - Water: 0.0077 sq mi (0.02 km^{2})

Population (2010)
  - Total: 1,296
  - Estimate (2016): 1,232
  - Density: 115.0/sq mi (44.41/km^{2})
- Time zone: UTC-5 (Eastern (EST))
  - Summer (DST): UTC-4 (EDT)
- Area code: 814
- FIPS code: 42-021-82688

West Carroll Township is a township in Cambria County, Pennsylvania, United States and consists of the communities of Bakerton, Barnes, Carrolltown Road, Elmora and St. Benedict. The population was 1,296 at the 2010 census. It is part of the Johnstown, Pennsylvania Metropolitan Statistical Area.

== Geography ==
The township is located in northwestern Cambria County, bordered partially by the borough of Carrolltown to the east. The borough of Northern Cambria touches the northwestern corner of the township. Ebensburg, the Cambria County seat, is 9 miles (14 km) to the south.

According to the United States Census Bureau, the township has a total area of 10.7 square miles (27.8 km^{2}), of which 0.008 square miles (0.02 km^{2}), or 0.06%, is water. The headwaters of the West Branch Susquehanna River are in the township, at the East Carroll Township border.

== Communities ==
=== Unincorporated communities ===
- Carrolltown Road
- Elmora
- Foxburg
- Saint Benedict

== Demographics ==
Historical population
Census	Pop.	Note	%±
2000	1,445		—
2010	1,296		−10.3%
2016 (est.)	1,232		−4.9%
U.S. Decennial Census

As of the census of 2000, there were 1,445 people, 534 households, and 410 families residing in the township. The population density was 135.5 inhabitants per square mile (52.3/km^{2}). There were 570 housing units at an average density of 53.4 per square mile (20.6/km^{2}). The racial makeup of the township was 99.58% White, 0.07% African American, and 0.35% from two or more races.

There were 534 households, out of which 28.1% had children under the age of 18 living with them, 58.4% were married couples living together, 12.4% had a female householder with no husband present, and 23.2% were non-families. 22.1% of all households were made up of individuals, and 12.7% had someone living alone who was 65 years of age or older. The average household size was 2.60 and the average family size was 3.02.

In the township, the population was spread out, with 21.5% under the age of 18, 7.3% from 18 to 24, 25.2% from 25 to 44, 23.7% from 45 to 64, and 22.4% who were 65 years of age or older. The median age was 43 years. For every 100 females, there were 98.2 males. For every 100 females age 18 and over, there were 94.3 males.

The median income for a household in the township was $27,917, and the median income for a family was $32,031. Males had a median income of $26,029 versus $19,583 for females. The per capita income for the township was $13,177. About 12.1% of families and 12.8% of the population were below the poverty line, including 15.5% of those under age 18 and 7.8% of those age 65 or over.
