= Market Street Bridge (Clearfield, Pennsylvania) =

Market St. Bridge (Clearfield, PA)
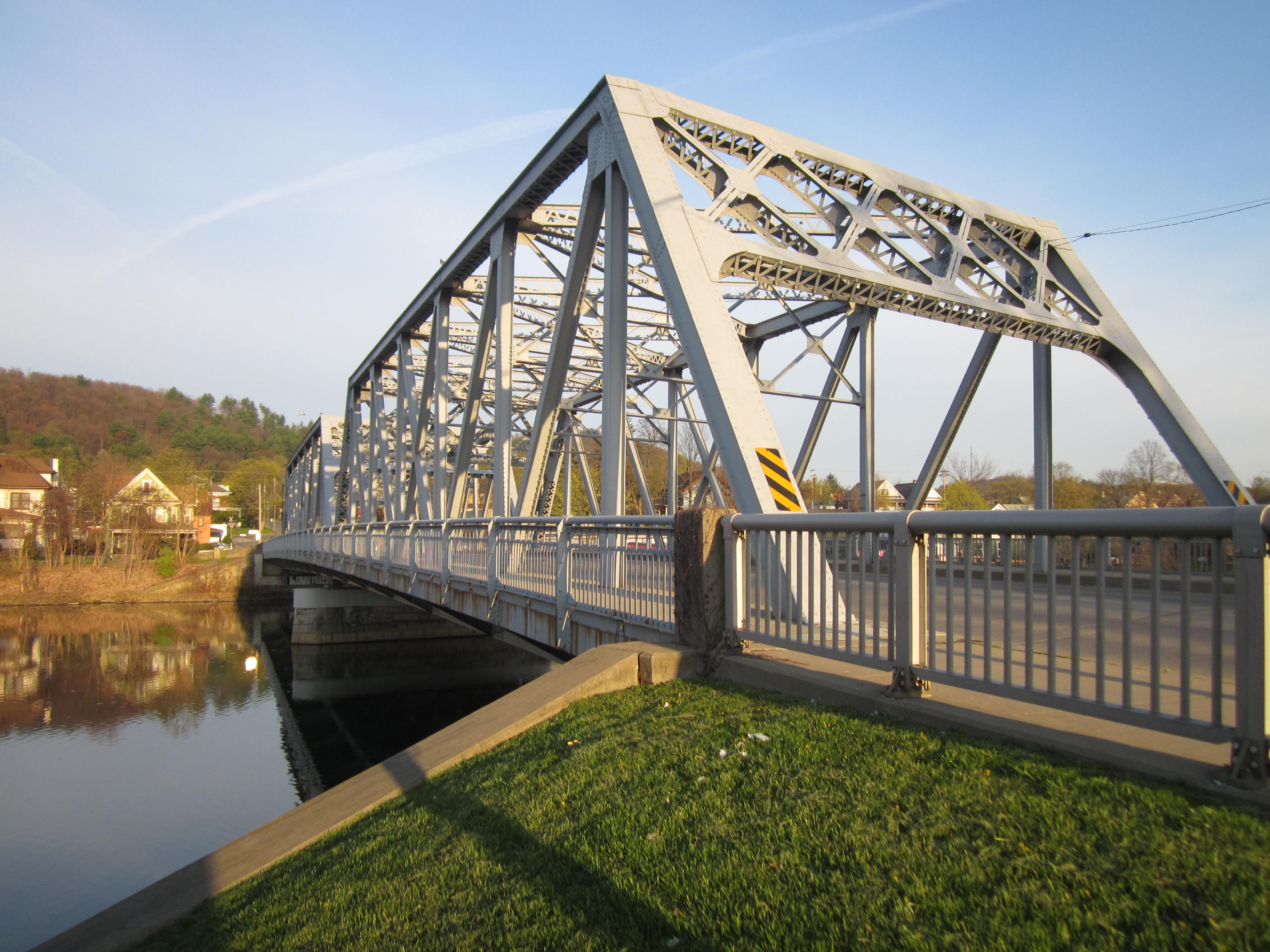
- Coordinates: 41°01′19″N 78°26′30″W
- Carries: Motor vehicles, 2 lanes, pedestrians
- Crosses: West Branch Susquehanna River
- Locale: Clearfield, Pennsylvania

Characteristics
- Design: Truss bridge
- Total length: 322 feet (98 m)
- Width: 34.5 feet (10.5 m)
- Height: 11 meter

The Market Street Bridge (Clearfield, PA) is a bridge that is located in the borough of Clearfield, Pennsylvania. It connects East Market Street and West Market Street, and crosses the West Branch Susquehanna River as one of three bridges in the town that span this river.

== History ==
The Market Street Bridge was built in 1938 by on-site contractor Clyde Thomson of Bethlehem Steel of Bethlehem, Pennsylvania. The steel for the structure was produced by the Pittsburgh-Des Moines Steel Company of Pittsburgh, Pennsylvania and Des Moines, Iowa. The bridge was rehabilitated in 1994.
