= Carrolltown, Pennsylvania =

Borough in Pennsylvania, US

- Borough
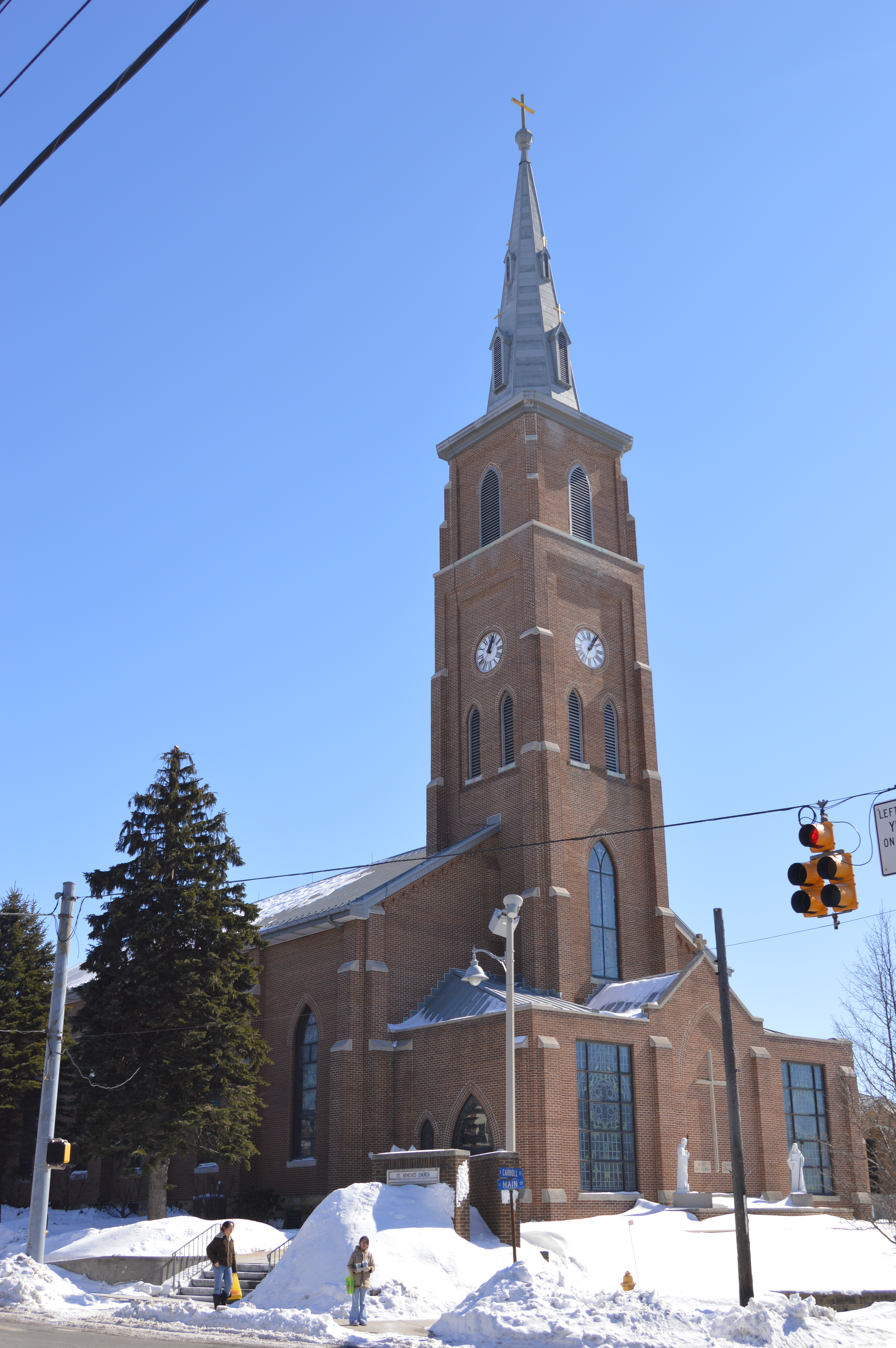
- St. Benedict's Church on Main Street
- Motto: Now and in the Future
- Location of Carrolltown in Cambria County, Pennsylvania.

- Location within Pennsylvania
- Coordinates: 40°36′N 78°43′W
- Country: United States
- State: Pennsylvania
- County: Cambria
- Incorporated: 1858

Government
  - Type: Borough council

Area
  - Total: 0.71 sq mi (1.84 km^{2})
  - Land: 0.71 sq mi (1.84 km^{2})
  - Water: 0 sq mi (0.00 km^{2})
- Elevation: 2,136 ft (651 m)

Population (2020)
  - Total: 1,051
  - Density: 1,479.8/sq mi (571.35/km^{2})
- Time zone: UTC-5 (Eastern (EST))
  - Summer (DST): UTC-4 (EDT)
- Zip code: 15722
- Area code: 814
- FIPS code: 42-11456
- GNIS feature ID: 1215011
- Website: www.carrolltown.pa.us

Carrolltown is a borough in Cambria County, Pennsylvania, United States. As of the 2020 census, Carrolltown had a population of 1,051. It is part of the Johnstown, Pennsylvania Metropolitan Statistical Area.

== Geography ==
Carrolltown is located in northern Cambria County at 40°36′N 78°43′W (40.603, -78.709), approximately 20 miles west of Altoona. U.S. Route 219 passes through the borough, leading northwest 6 miles (10 km) to Northern Cambria and south 8 miles (13 km) to Ebensburg, the county seat.

According to the United States Census Bureau, Carrolltown has a total area of 0.69 square miles (1.8 km^{2}), all land.

== Demographics ==
Historical population
| Census | Pop. | Note | %± |
|---|---|---|---|
| 1860 | 249 | | — |
| 1870 | 416 | | 67.1% |
| 1880 | 502 | | 20.7% |
| 1890 | 634 | | 26.3% |
| 1900 | 790 | | 24.6% |
| 1910 | 1,348 | | 70.6% |
| 1920 | 1,369 | | 1.6% |
| 1930 | 1,227 | | −10.4% |
| 1940 | 1,289 | | 5.1% |
| 1950 | 1,452 | | 12.6% |
| 1960 | 1,525 | | 5.0% |
| 1970 | 1,507 | | −1.2% |
| 1980 | 1,395 | | −7.4% |
| 1990 | 1,286 | | −7.8% |
| 2000 | 1,049 | | −18.4% |
| 2010 | 853 | | −18.7% |
| 2020 | 1,051 | | 23.2% |

As of the census of 2000, there were 1,049 people, 407 households, and 295 families living in the borough. The population density was 1,583.8 inhabitants per square mile (611.5/km^{2}). There were 440 housing units at an average density of 664.3 per square mile (256.5/km^{2}). The racial makeup of the borough was 99.62% White, 0.19% African American, and 0.19% from two or more races.

There were 407 households, out of which 29.2% had children under the age of 18 living with them, 59.0% were married couples living together, 10.8% had a female householder with no husband present, and 27.5% were non-families. 25.3% of all households were made up of individuals, and 17.0% had someone living alone who was 65 years of age or older. The average household size was 2.56 and the average family size was 3.06.

In the borough the population was spread out, with 22.2% under the age of 18, 7.2% from 18 to 24, 27.4% from 25 to 44, 23.7% from 45 to 64, and 19.4% who were 65 years of age or older. The median age was 41 years. For every 100 females there were 102.5 males. For every 100 females age 18 and over, there were 98.1 males.

The median income for a household in the borough was $32,833, and the median income for a family was $39,792. Males had a median income of $33,056 versus $17,500 for females. The per capita income for the borough was $16,250. About 6.2% of families and 8.0% of the population were below the poverty line, including 4.7% of those under age 18 and 9.8% of those age 65 or over.

== Notable people ==
- Bishop John Carroll, first Catholic bishop and archbishop in the United States
- Peter Henry Lemke, Roman Catholic missionary
- Victoria Lipnic, Commissioner of the Equal Employment Opportunity Commission
