= Millersburg, Pennsylvania =

Borough in Pennsylvania, US

- Borough
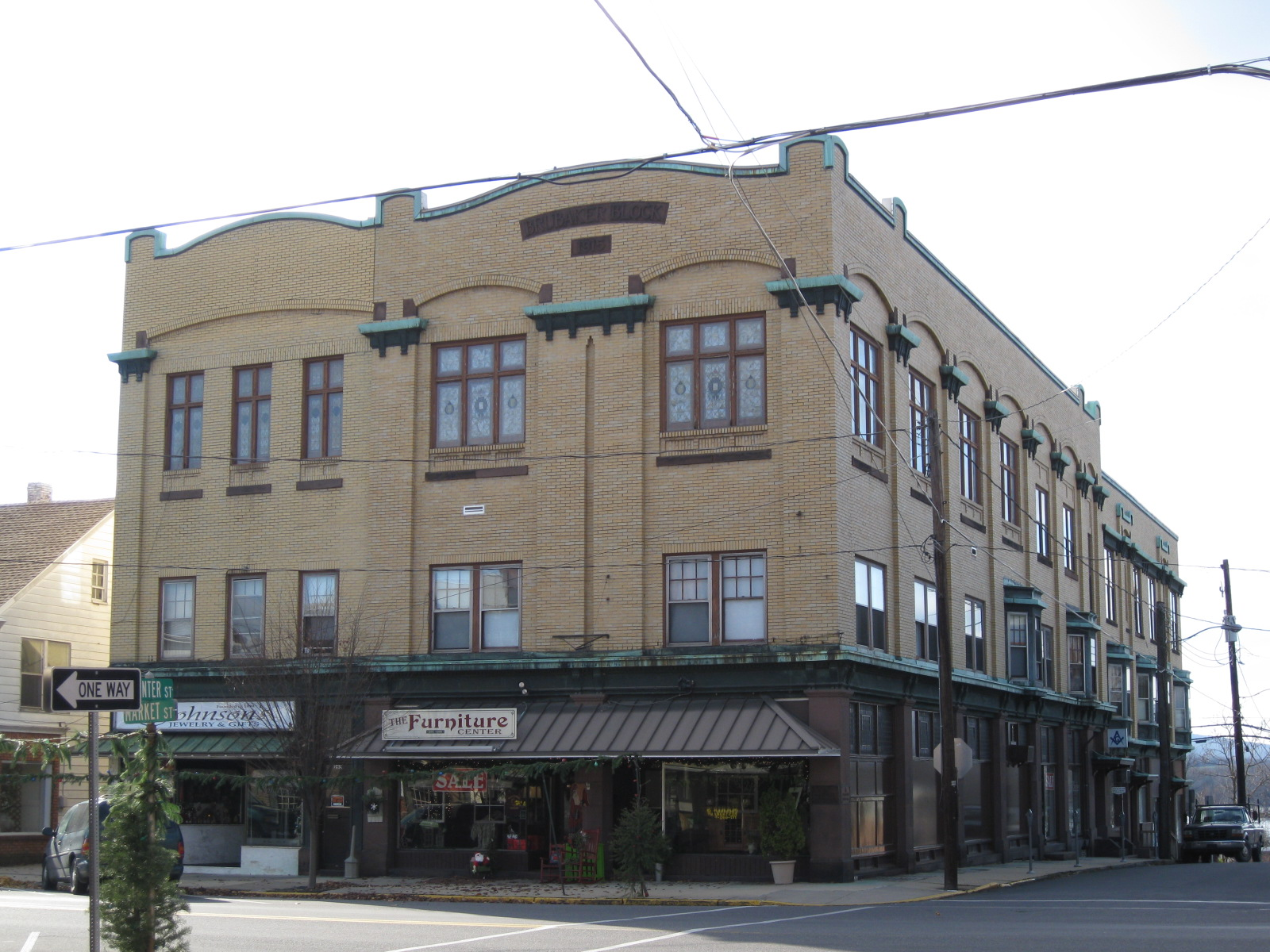
- Millersburg, Pennsylvania

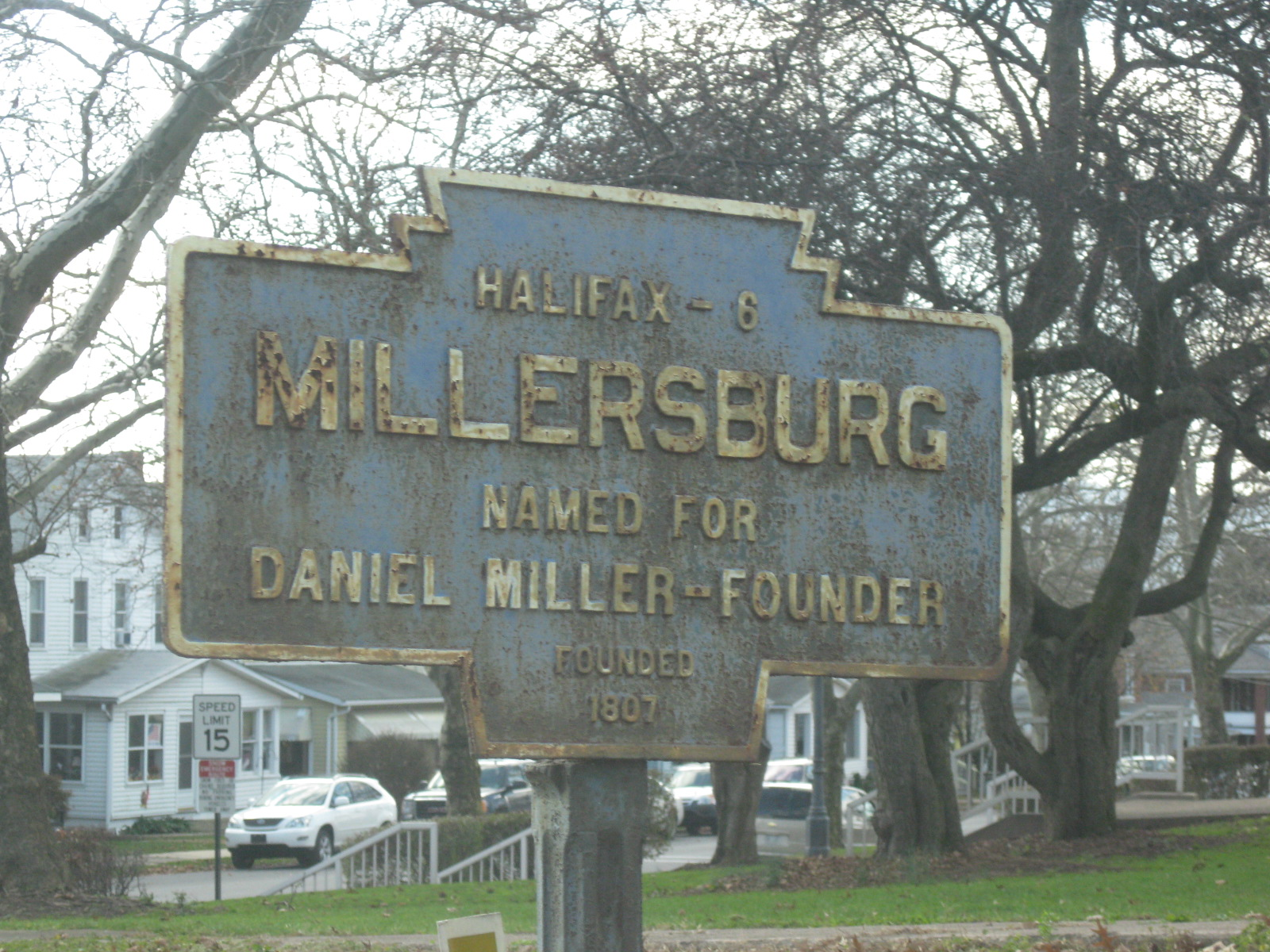
- Seal Keystone Marker

- Location in Dauphin County and the U.S. state of Pennsylvania.

- Location in Pennsylvania and the United States Millersburg (the United States)
- Coordinates: 40°32′30″N 76°57′26″W
- Country: United States
- State: Pennsylvania
- County: Dauphin
- Settled: 1807
- Incorporated: 1850

Government
  - Type: Borough Council
  - Mayor: Richard Ibberson

Area
  - Total: 0.76 sq mi (1.97 km^{2})
  - Land: 0.76 sq mi (1.97 km^{2})
  - Water: 0 sq mi (0.00 km^{2})
- Elevation: 430 ft (130 m)

Population (2020)
  - Total: 2,545
  - Density: 3,352.4/sq mi (1,294.37/km^{2})
- Time zone: UTC-5 (Eastern (EST))
  - Summer (DST): UTC-4 (EDT)
- ZIP code: 17061
- Area code: 717
- FIPS code: 42-49680
- Website: www.millersburgpa.org

Millersburg is a borough in Dauphin County, Pennsylvania, United States. The population was 2,541 at the 2020 census. It is part of the Harrisburg metropolitan area.

== Geography ==
Millersburg is located in northwestern Dauphin County on the east bank of the Susquehanna River at 40°32′30″N 76°57′26″W (40.541676, -76.957283). Wiconisco Creek enters the Susquehanna at the southern edge of the borough. According to the United States Census Bureau, Millersburg has a total area of 0.76 square miles (1.97 km^{2}), all land.

Millersburg is the southwestern terminus of U.S. Route 209, which leads northeast 44 miles (71 km) to Pottsville and 211 miles (340 km) to its northeastern terminus north of Kingston, New York. Pennsylvania Route 147 passes through the center of Millersburg as Market Street, leading north (upriver) 29 miles (47 km) to Sunbury and south (downriver) 13 miles (21 km) to U.S. Route 22 near Duncannon. The Millersburg Ferry leads west across the Susquehanna to Buffalo Township in Perry County, allowing a connection to U.S. Routes 11 and 15.

== History ==
Millersburg was formed in 1807 from a portion of Upper Paxton Township. Its founder was Daniel Miller, for whom the community was named.

The Millersburg Ferry and Millersburg Passenger Rail Station are listed on the National Register of Historic Places.

During the spring of 1790, Daniel Miller and his brother, John were traveling north along the Susquehanna River. When they arrived at the north side of Berry's Mountain, tradition has it, Daniel was so taken with the beauty of the area where the Wiconisco Creek joined with the Susquehanna that he resolved to purchase the land at that location. On June 2, 1790, Miller received a deed for 979-1/4 acres at the mouth of the Wiconisco Creek from William Von Phul of Philadelphia, the owner of the land upon which Millersburg is now situated.

In 1794, Miller built his first cabin that later served as a school in which he taught the children of the surrounding area without compensation. The building was on the site of the old Johnson-Baillie Shoe Company factory on Pine near Market Street. It was not until 1805, upon completion of a more suitable dwelling which still stands on the northeast corner of Pine and Walnut streets that Miller brought his wife, Elizabeth, and their two children to their new home. In 1807, Miller's dream of a town on the banks of the Susquehanna became a reality. During that year, he had the land surveyed and laid out into lots, reserving land for churches, the town square and a riverside park. Until a church could be built, Miller, who was a lay minister of the Methodist Church, held services in his own home.

Transportation in Millersburg has always been a very important commodity to the community. Two major transportation projects were planned for Millersburg in the 19th century: one was the Lykens Valley R.R. & Coal Company, and the other was the extension of the Pennsylvania Canal, both proposed in the 1830s. The state began construction of the Wiconisco Canal as part of the Eastern Division of the Pennsylvania Canal in 1837. Millersburg was the northern terminus of the Dauphin County Canal network.

== Demographics ==
Historical population
Census	Pop.	Note	%±
1860	961		—
1870	1,518		58.0%
1880	1,440		−5.1%
1890	1,527		6.0%
1900	1,675		9.7%
1910	2,394		42.9%
1920	2,936		22.6%
1930	2,909		−0.9%
1940	2,959		1.7%
1950	2,861		−3.3%
1960	2,984		4.3%
1970	3,074		3.0%
1980	2,770		−9.9%
1990	2,729		−1.5%
2000	2,562		−6.1%
2010	2,557		−0.2%
2020	2,545		−0.5%
2021 (est.)	2,535	▼	−0.4%

As of the census of 2000, there were 2,562 people, 1,213 households, and 695 families residing in the borough. The population density was 3,290.2 inhabitants per square mile (1,270.4/km^{2}). There were 1,315 housing units at an average density of 1,688.7 units per square mile (652.0 units/km^{2}). The racial makeup of the borough was 98.52% White, 0.23% African American, 0.12% Native American, 0.51% Asian, 0.31% from other races, and 0.31% from two or more races. Hispanic or Latino of any race were 1.09% of the population.

There were 1,213 households, out of which 24.4% had children under the age of 18 living with them, 44.0% were married couples living together, 9.3% had a female householder with no husband present, and 42.7% were non-families. 37.8% of all households were made up of individuals, and 20.4% had someone living alone who was 65 years of age or older. The average household size was 2.11 and the average family size was 2.78.

In the borough the population was spread out, with 20.6% under the age of 18, 9.2% from 18 to 24, 28.4% from 25 to 44, 20.6% from 45 to 64, and 21.2% who were 65 years of age or older. The median age was 39 years. For every 100 females, there were 84.8 males. For every 100 females age 18 and over, there were 84.8 males.

The median income for a household in the borough was $34,970, and the median income for a family was $44,327. Males had a median income of $29,625 versus $23,205 for females. The per capita income for the borough was $19,217. About 4.7% of families and 6.8% of the population were below the poverty line, including 5.8% of those under age 18 and 7.8% of those age 65 or over.

== Millersburg ferry ==
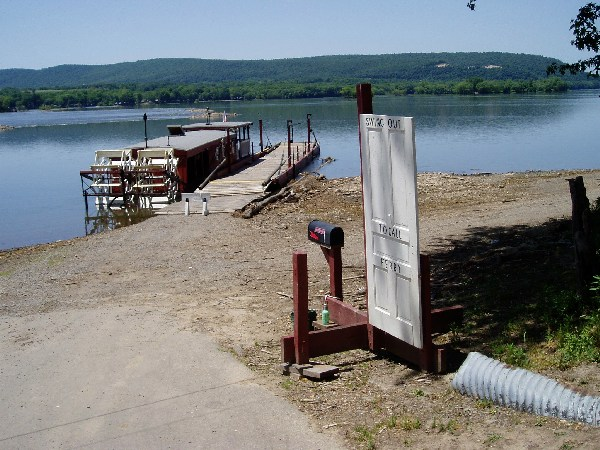
The Millersburg Ferry

The Millersburg Ferry, the last surviving ferry which crosses the Susquehanna River, and the last wooden-stern paddle-wheel ferry operating within the United States, operates out of Millersburg, which sits on the east side of the river. According to a sign posted at the ferry dock, a ferry has operated here since 1825. The original ferries were poled across the river. Paddle-wheel boats went into operation in 1873. The current ferries are wooden-stern paddle-wheelers which can carry up to four automobiles. The one-mile crossing goes to a point on the west side of the Susquehanna, in a campground near the point where Pennsylvania Route 34 meets U.S. Route 11 and U.S. Route 15, and near Liverpool. The ferry boats were officially listed on the National Register of Historic Places in 2006.

The river at this location is very wide (approximately 1 mile) but is typically very shallow, sometimes only 2 feet (0.61 m) deep. The ferry follows a course across the river near a submerged man-made wall composed of river rocks and debris which provides slightly deeper clearance and prevents the ferry from grounding out.

== Ned Smith Center for Nature and Art ==
Millersburg is the home of the Ned Smith Center for Nature and Art, opened on October 9, 2004 which is named after local wildlife artist and frequent columnist of "Gone for the Day" featured in the Pennsylvania Game News. The Center features three gallery spaces, a gift shop, offices, classrooms, and over 500 acres of trails and streams for outdoor activities. The Ned Smith Center is also well known for its environmental and arts education. A variety of youth summer camps, family "discovery programs" and school field trips are available.

During the Spring and Summer months, the Ned Smith Center hosts a variety of live performances on the DeSoto Amphitheater. The amphitheater was built through the patronage of Carole Desoto in 2014 and has featured shows including ballet performances, rock concerts, and "Shakespeare in the Woods", the cumulative show of an acting camp for children hosted at the Center by Gamut Theatre Group.
