= Millersburg Ferry =

Susquehanna River ferry

- U.S. National Register of Historic Places
- Pennsylvania state historical marker
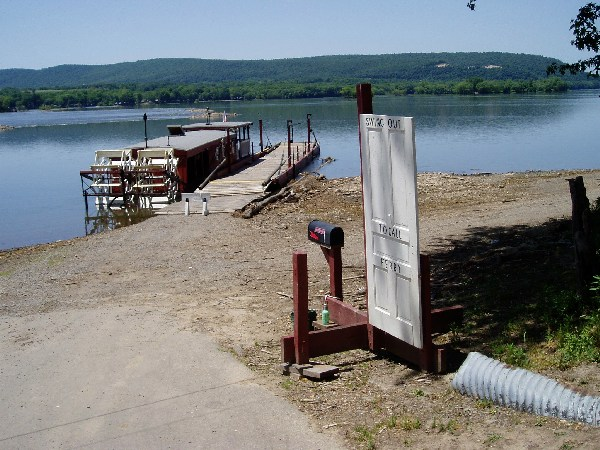
- The Millersburg Ferry as viewed from the eastern shore. Note the ferry wall to the downstream side of the boat, midway across the river.

- Location within Pennsylvania Location within the United States
- Location: Susquehanna R. bet. Millersburg and Buffalo Township, Millersburg, Pennsylvania
- Coordinates: 40°32′39″N 76°58′25″W
- Area: 146 acres (0.59 km^{2})
- Built: 1817
- NRHP reference No.: 06000663

Significant dates
- Added to NRHP: August 2, 2006
- Designated PHMC: May 20, 1973

The Millersburg Ferry, also known as the Crow's Ferry, is the last operating ferry on the Susquehanna River. It crosses the river between Millersburg in Dauphin County and Buffalo Township in Perry County, Pennsylvania in the United States. The ferry was established in the early 19th century. The Millersburg Ferry crossing was placed on the National Register of Historic Places in 2006. Its ferry boat is believed to be the last "wooden double stern-wheel paddle boat" to be operating in the United States. It is owned by the Millersburg Chamber of Commerce and operated by the Millersburg Ferryboat Association from May until October when water levels permit.

== History ==
Ferries have been crossing the Susquehanna River at Millersburg since at least the early 19th century. The one mile (1.6 km) crossing was first served by a pole ferry that was much like a bateau. The ferry predates the establishment of Millersburg in 1807. The borough's founder Daniel Miller reserved the ferry and shad fishery rights along the Susquehanna for himself.

Records from 1817 and 1820 show that the ferry was operated by George Carson or Michael Crow. Crow was to have built a road from the ferry landing on the west shore in Perry County to the "Great Road", modern U.S. Routes 11 and 15, and Carson would operate the ferry. It is not known if Carson ever took over operation of the ferry, but Crow did petition to have the road built in 1819. The 1820 tax records show that Crow was assessed for a farm, sawmill and ferry. This west shore landing became known as "Crow's Landing". An 1826 sheriff's sale showed that the proprietary rights for the eastern landing were transferred from Daniel Miller to David Kramer for $60.00 (equal to $1,707.35 today).

Ownership and rights to the ferry were hotly contested between the 1820s and 1866. These conflicts were not settled until 1866 when the Millersburg Ferry was licensed by the Pennsylvania State Legislature.

Joseph Kramer, son of David Kramer, was granted by the Act of March 21, 1866 P.L. 358, the right to operate the ferry at his own expense. Part of the act stipulated that Kramer build and maintain landings on both shores of the river.

Steam powered ferry boats replaced the old pole boats in 1873. These boats were much heavier and required deeper water to cross the Susquehanna River. This was accomplished by building a ferry wall or dam from shore to shore. These walls are still used today and are an important part of the ferry's designation as a Registered Historic Place.

The Millersburg Ferry grew in importance over the years and ownership was transferred from David Kramer to his sons George and Joseph. The ferry was sold at least ten times between the 1870s and 1907. Joseph Matthias Johnson owned, and operated in his own individual right, Kramer's Ferry from 1873 until 1877. Thomas Radel and his family and Warren "Pop" Hunter and his family operated the ferry from 1907 until 1968 when it was sold to Robert and Bud Wallis and Jim Zeiders. Robert Wallis became the sole owner in 1972. Wallis sold the ferry operation to Community Banks, N.A. of Millersburg in 1990. The bank then donated the historic ferry boat operation to the Millersburg Chamber of Commerce in 1990, which formed the Millersburg Ferryboat Association.

The construction of bridges over the Susquehanna River led to the closing of all the ferries on the river. The Millersburg Ferry remains for its historic significance and for practical reasons as well. It is the only crossing of the river for forty miles between Duncannon and Sunbury.

== Transportation ==
The Millersburg Ferry was a crucial part of transportation in the central Susquehanna River Valley from 1866 until 1956. The construction of the railroad through Millersburg and establishment of a station there increased the importance of the ferry. Citizens from the western shore used the ferry on a regular basis to transport their goods from Perry and Juniata Counties to the commercial centers of Harrisburg, Lancaster and Philadelphia. People on the eastern shore used the ferry to reach recreational destinations on the western shore.

The Millersburg Ferry used as many as four boats to shuttle produce, livestock, building supplies and people and their horses, wagons, and eventually motor vehicles. This boom period for the ferry lasted from 1905 until 1936. The Great Depression resulted in the ferry service being cut to three boats. The ferry company now has a fleet of two boats.

== Fleet and operation ==
The Millersburg Ferry consists of two boats. The Roaring Bull V is a red paddle wheeler that was built in 1998. The "flat" of the ferry is 83 feet (25 m) long and the power unit is 50 feet (15 m). It is powered by a 57 horsepower (43 kW) Deutz diesel engine with a hydraulic drive system. The Falcon III was built in 1974. It is gray and is 8.3 feet (2.5 m) longer than the Roaring Bull V. It also has a Deutz diesel air-cooled engine and a hydraulic drive system.

According to Captain Donald Lebo, the trip is 4,785 feet (1,458 m) shore to shore, about nine-tenths of a mile, and takes about 20 minutes. Passenger traffic in 2009 was above normal because the water level was high and operations did not have to shut for low water. About 20,000 passengers, who were mostly tourists, were served, paying either by the person or by the car. As of the 2025 season, the rates are $5 for a one-way walk on passenger, $10 for a round trip walk on passenger. Other one-way fares: $10 for a motorcycle and rider; $15 for a car, pickup, van, or SUV and driver. All other passengers in a vehicle are charged the $5 fare. There are also fares for specialty vehicles such as horse and buggy and golf carts. The Millersburg Ferry is reached from Pennsylvania Route 147 on the eastern shore in Millersburg and from U.S. Route 11/15 on the western shore just south of Liverpool. The Ferry does not run on a set schedule, but as traffic warrants and water levels allow. Also as per wind and weather conditions. Ferry service is available from May through mid-October. Please call or text 717.692.2442 to see if the ferry is operating or visit the Millersburg Ferry Facebook page for daily schedule updates.

== Gallery ==
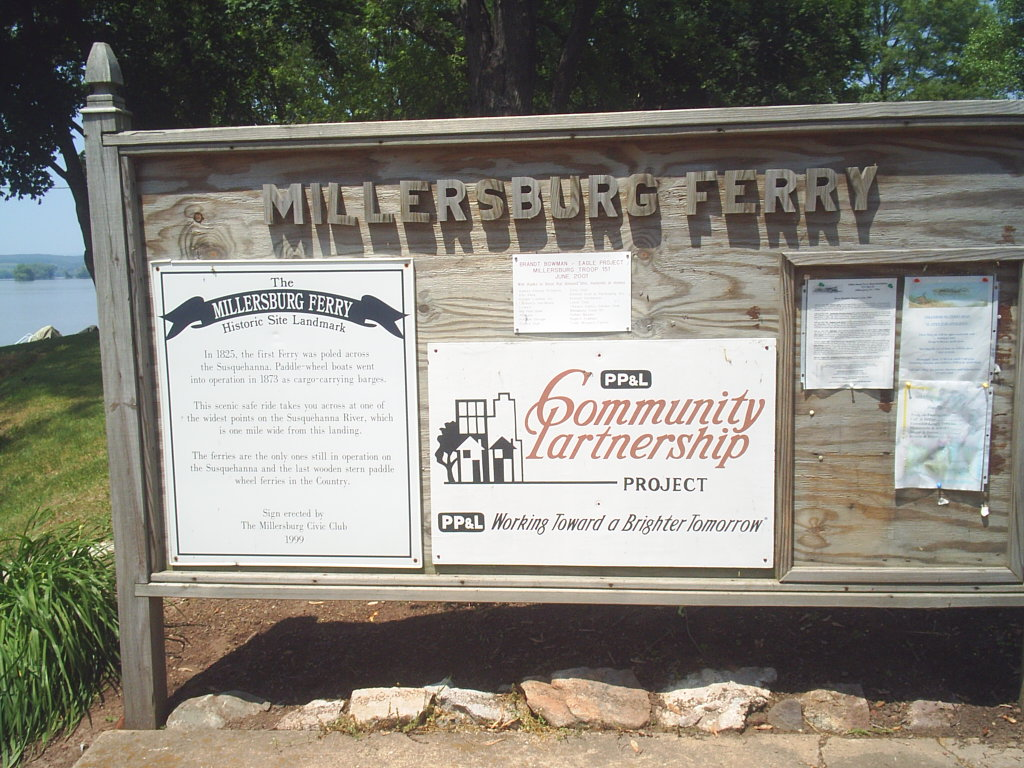

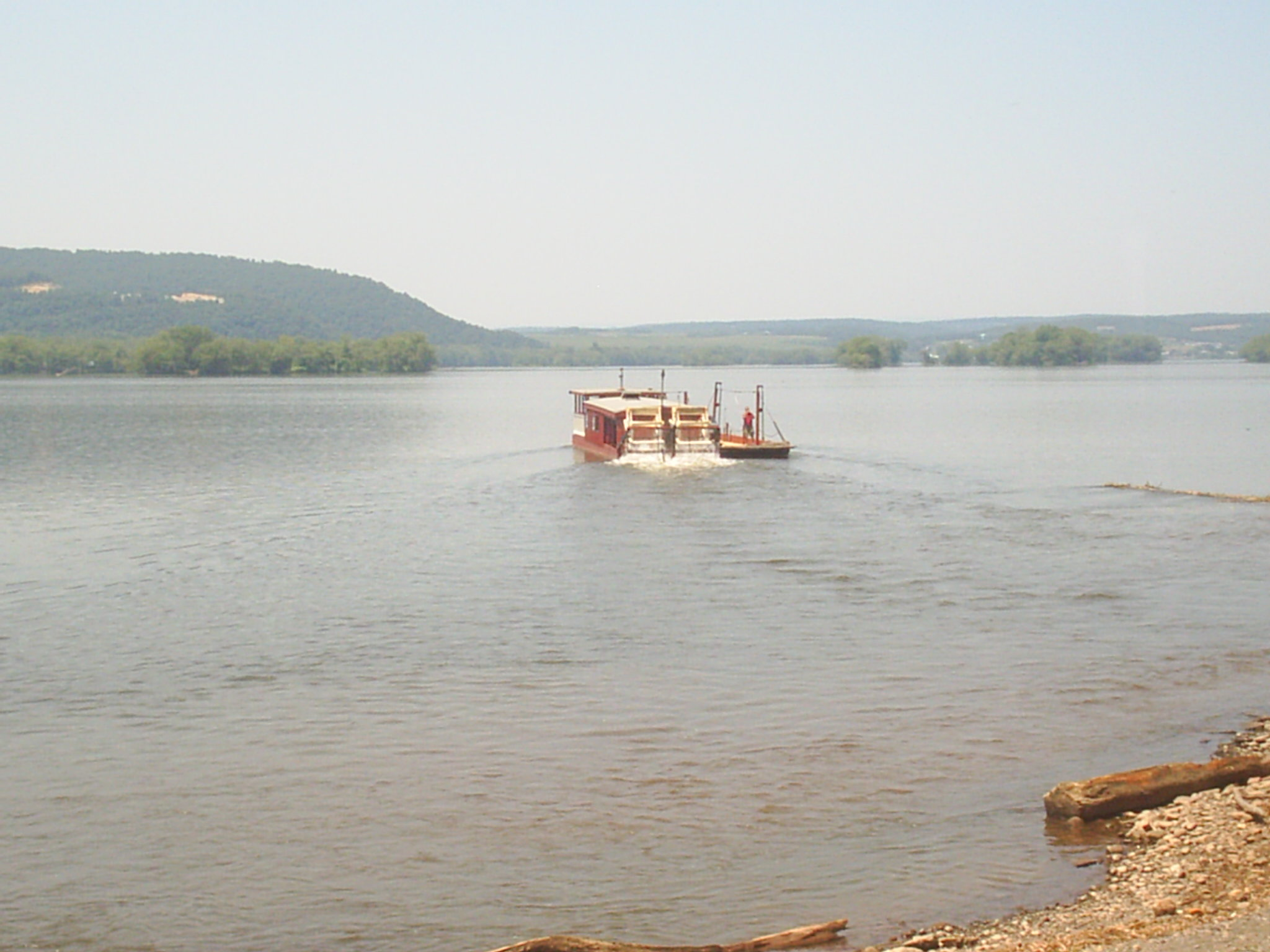

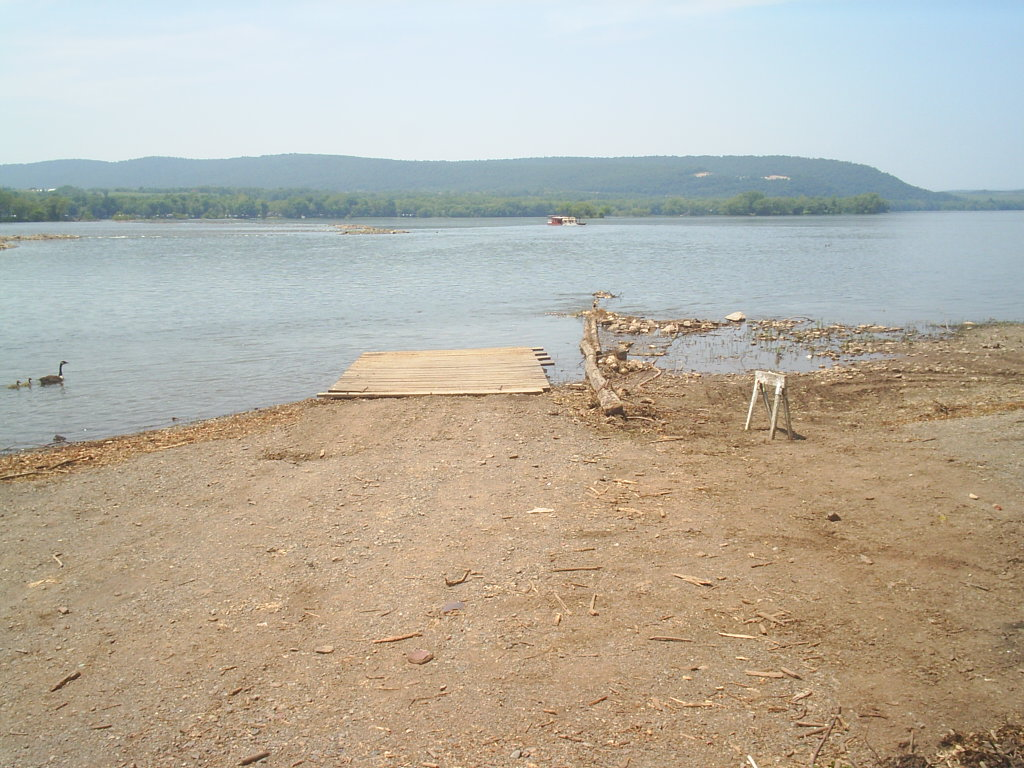
