= Millersburg station =

- Millersburg
- U.S. National Register of Historic Places
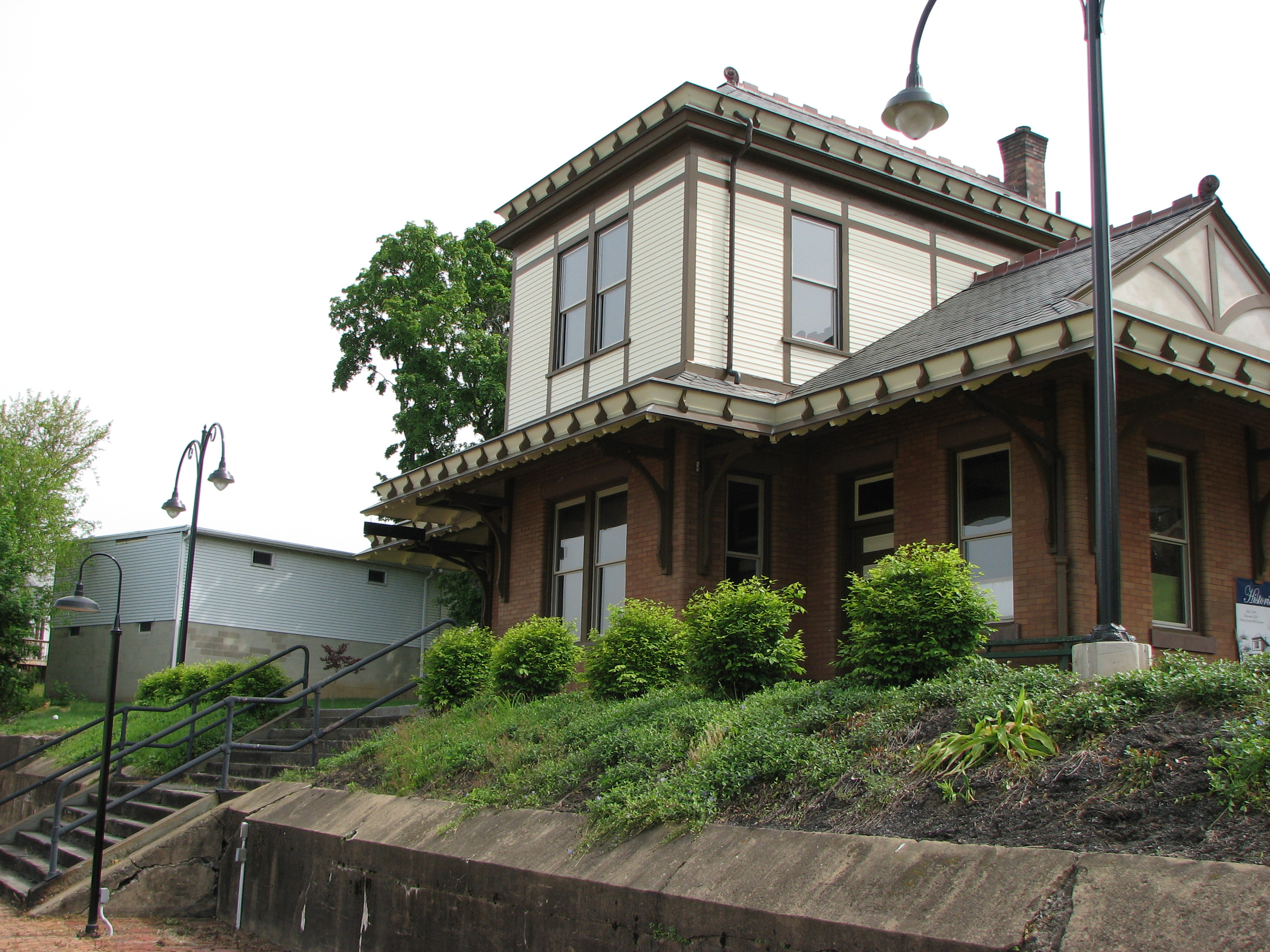
- Millersburg Passenger Rail Station, May 2009

- Location within Pennsylvania Location within the United States
- Location: 127 W. Center St., Millersburg, Pennsylvania
- Coordinates: 40°32′25″N 76°57′48″W
- Area: less than one acre
- Built: 1898
- Built by: Harnon & Jones, Builder
- Architectural style: Queen Anne
- NRHP reference No.: 02001430
- Added to NRHP: November 27, 2002

The Millersburg station is an historic railway station that is located in Millersburg, Dauphin County, Pennsylvania, United States.

It was added to the National Register of Historic Places in 2002 as Millersburg Passenger Rail Station.

== History and architectural features ==
Built in 1898 by the Northern Central Railway, this historic structure is a two-story, brick and frame building that was designed in the Queen Anne style. It features a deep porch that wraps around three sides of the building. The property also includes the stone foundation of the original baggage house. This building was used as a passenger station until 1960.

In 1982, it was acquired by the Historical Society of Millersburg. It is used as an information center for tourists and visitors and houses offices of the Millersburg Ferry Boat Association and Millersburg Area Chamber of Commerce.

Preceding station	Pennsylvania Railroad	Following station
Liverpool toward Canandelaigua	Northern Central Railway; Susquehanna & Elmira Division	McClellan toward Harrisburg
