= Spades Wharf Island =

Coordinates: 40°11′24″N 76°46′7″W

Spades Wharf Island is a small island in the Susquehanna River in Lower Swatara Township, Pennsylvania, near Highspire, Pennsylvania. Near the Harrisburg International Airport, the island itself is part of the Pennsylvania State Game Lands and is known for its small shape.
