= Susquehanna River =

Major river in the Northeastern United States

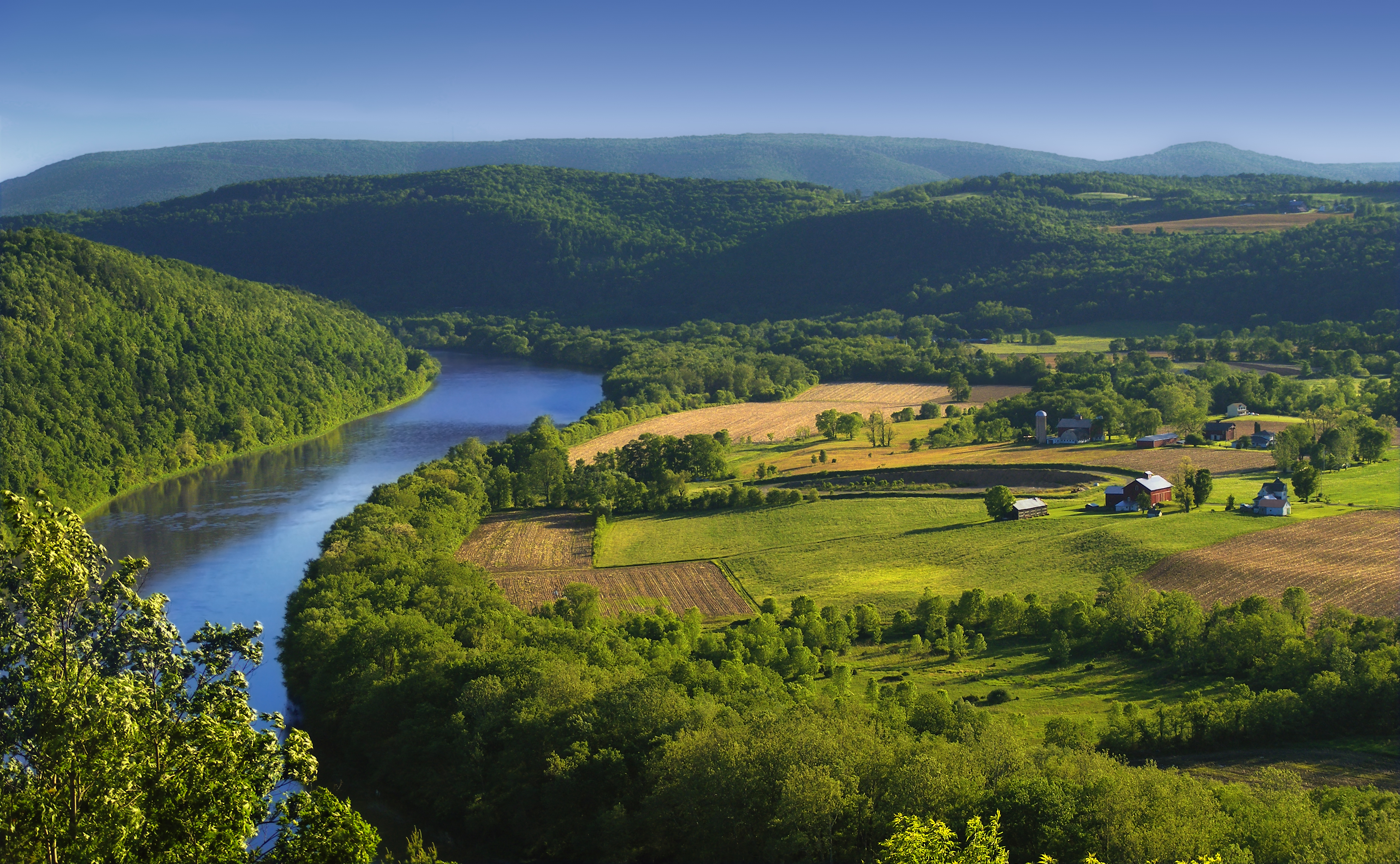
- Susquehanna River in Bradford County, Pennsylvania

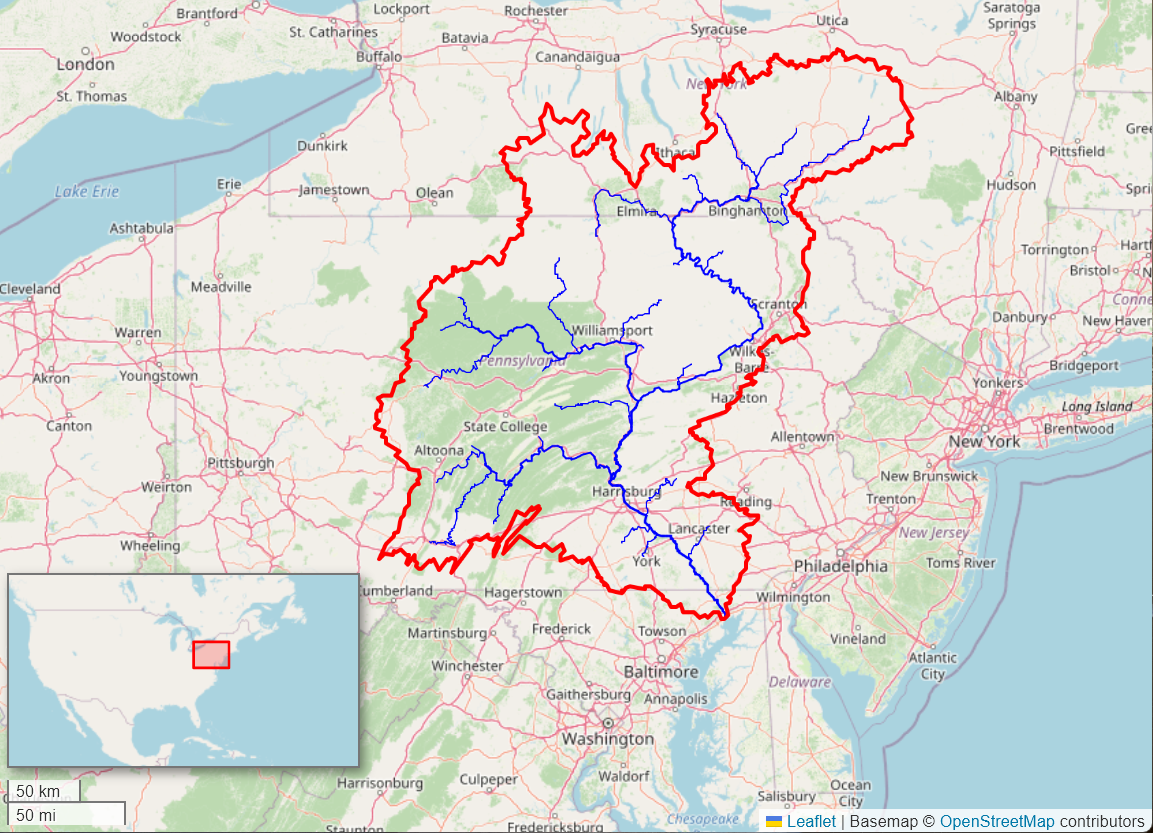
- Map of the Susquehanna River drainage basin
- Native name: Siskëwahane (Unami)

Location
- Country: United States
- States: New York, Pennsylvania, Maryland
- Cities: (in order starting north and ending south) Binghamton, NY, Pittston, PA, Wilkes-Barre, PA, Williamsport, PA, Bloomsburg, PA, Northumberland, PA, Sunbury, PA, Harrisburg, PA (PA state capital), Port Deposit, MD, Havre de Grace, MD

Physical characteristics
- Source: Otsego Lake
  - location: Cooperstown, Otsego County, New York, USA
  - coordinates: 42°42′02″N 74°55′10″W
  - elevation: 1,191 ft (363 m)
- Mouth: Chesapeake Bay
  - location: Havre de Grace, Cecil County / Harford County, Maryland, USA
  - coordinates: 39°32′35″N 76°04′32″W
  - elevation: 0 ft (0 m)
- Length: 444 mi (715 km)
- Basin size: 27,500 sq mi (71,000 km^{2})
- Discharge
  - location: Conowingo Dam, MD
  - average: 40,670 cu ft/s (1,152 m^{3}/s)
  - minimum: 2,990 cu ft/s (85 m^{3}/s)
  - maximum: 1,130,000 cu ft/s (32,000 m^{3}/s)June 24, 1972
- Discharge
  - location: Danville, PA
  - average: 16,850 cu ft/s (477 m^{3}/s)(Water years 1968-2019)

Basin features
- Tributaries
  - left: Lackawanna River, Mahanoy Creek, Swatara Creek, Conestoga River, Little Mehoopany Creek
  - right: Oaks Creek, Unadilla River, Chenango River, Chemung River, West Branch, Juniata River

The Susquehanna River (/ˌsʌskwəˈhænə/ SUSS-kwə-HAN-ə; Lenape: Siskëwahane) is a major river located in the Mid-Atlantic region of the United States, crossing three lower Northeast states (New York, Pennsylvania and Maryland). At 444 miles (715 km) long, it is the longest river on the East Coast of the United States. By watershed area, it is the 16th-largest river in the United States, and also the longest river in the early 21st-century continental United States without commercial boat traffic.

The Susquehanna River forms from two main branches: the North Branch, which rises in Cooperstown, New York, and is regarded by federal mapmakers as the main branch or headwaters, and the West Branch, which rises in western Pennsylvania and joins the main branch near Northumberland in central Pennsylvania.

The river drains 27,500 square miles (71,000 km^{2}), including nearly half of the land area of Pennsylvania. The drainage basin includes portions of the Allegheny Plateau region of the Appalachian Mountains, cutting through a succession of water gaps in a broad zigzag course to flow across the rural heartland of southeastern Pennsylvania and northeastern Maryland in the lateral near-parallel array of mountain ridges. The river empties into the northern end of the Chesapeake Bay at Perryville and Havre de Grace, Maryland, providing half of the bay's freshwater inflow. The bay lies in the flooded valley, or ria, of the Susquehanna.

== Geology ==
The Susquehanna River is likely an old river, cutting across the grain of ancient rift basins in the Piedmont as well as faults and folds of the Appalachians. It may have been established during the late Jurassic, Cretaceous or Tertiary Periods, tens to more than one hundred million years ago, when southeasterly drainage to the Atlantic Ocean Basin was established. The list of rivers by age gives its age as 270-340 million years.

== Course ==
Both branches and the lower Susquehanna were part of important regional transportation corridors. The river was extensively used for muscle-powered ferries, boats, and canal boat shipping of bulk goods in the brief decades before the Pennsylvania Canal system was eclipsed by the coming of age of steam-powered railways. While the railroad industry has been less prevalent since the closures and mergers of the 1950s–1960s, a wide-ranging rail transportation infrastructure still operates along the river's shores.

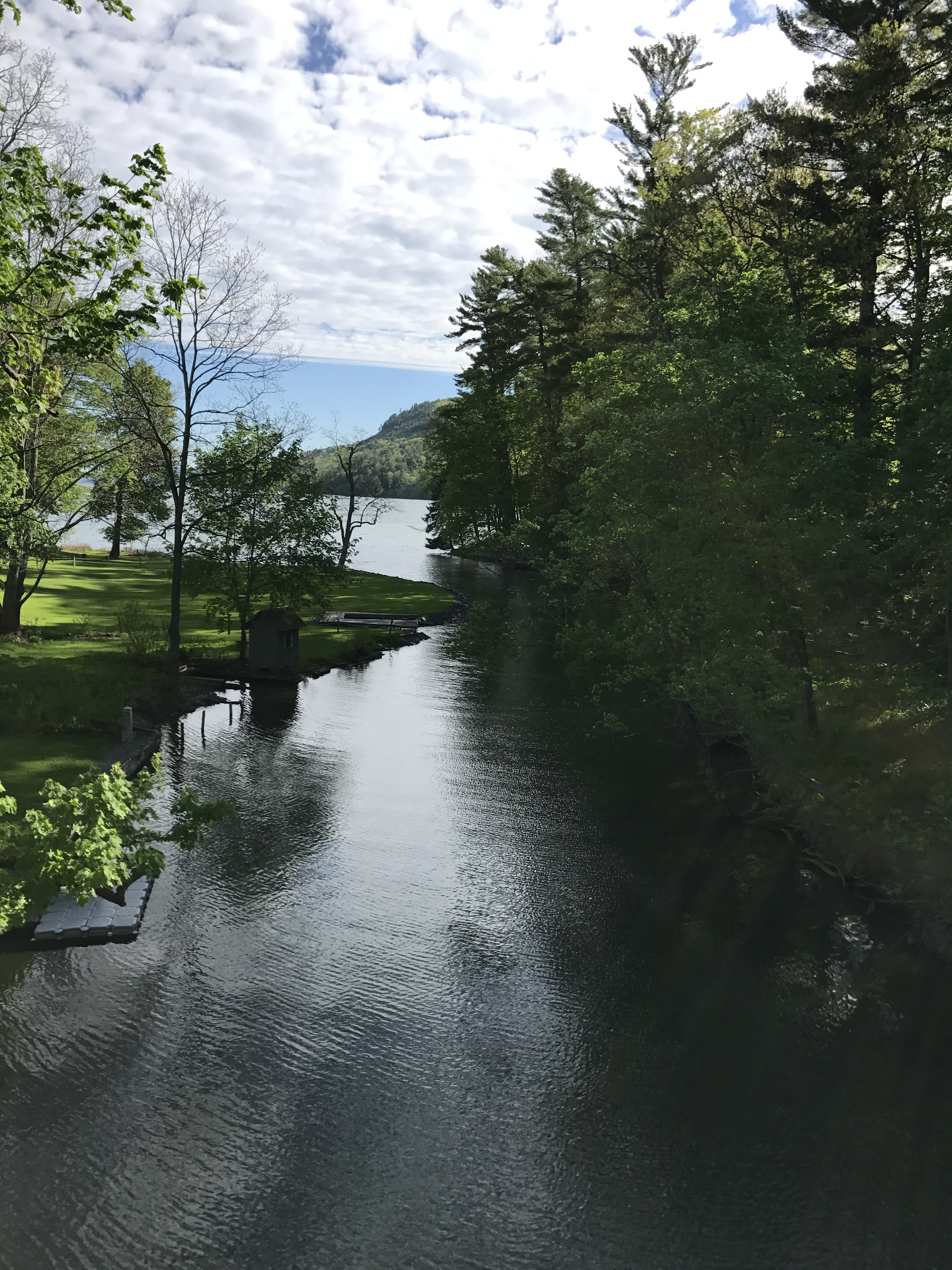
Susquehanna River at source, looking at Otsego Lake

=== North Branch Susquehanna ===
Also called the Main Branch Susquehanna, the longer branch of the river rises at the outlet of Otsego Lake in Cooperstown, New York. From there, the north branch of the river runs west-southwest through rural farmland and dairy country, receiving the Unadilla River at Sidney. It dips south into Pennsylvania briefly to turn sharply 90 degrees west at Susquehanna and again 90 degrees north at Great Bend hooking back into New York. It receives the Chenango in downtown Binghamton. After meandering westwards, it turns south crossing the line again through the twin towns of Waverly, New York, and Sayre, Pennsylvania, and their large right bank railyard, once briefly holding the largest structure in the United States devoted to the maintenance and construction of railroad locomotives.

A couple of miles south, in Athens Township, Pennsylvania, it receives the Chemung from the northwest. It makes a right-angle curve between Sayre and Towanda to cut through the Endless Mountains in the Allegheny Plateau of Pennsylvania. It receives the Lackawanna River southwest of Scranton and turns sharply to the southwest, flowing through the former anthracite industrial heartland in the mountain ridges of northeastern Pennsylvania, past Pittston City (Greater Pittston), Wilkes-Barre, Nanticoke, Shickshinny, Berwick, Bloomsburg, and Danville, before receiving the West Branch at Northumberland.

=== West Branch Susquehanna ===
The origin of the official West Branch is near Elmora, Pennsylvania, in northern Cambria County near the contemporary junction of Mitchel Road and US Route 219 (locally Plank Road). It travels northeasterly through the towns of Northern Cambria, Cherry Tree, Burnside, Mahaffey and Curwensville (where the river is dammed to form a lake), into and through Clearfield, where it receives Clearfield Creek.

The West Branch turns to the southeast and passes Karthaus (at Mosquito Creek), Keating (at Sinnemahoning Creek), Renovo and Lock Haven, where it receives Bald Eagle Creek. At Jersey Shore, Pennsylvania, Pine Creek, the largest tributary of the West Branch Susquehanna River, is received. Pine Creek has the largest watershed of all the West Branch's tributaries. It passes Williamsport, where both Lycoming Creek and Loyalsock Creek empty into it, then turns south, passing Lewisburg, before joining the North Branch flowing from the northwest at Northumberland.

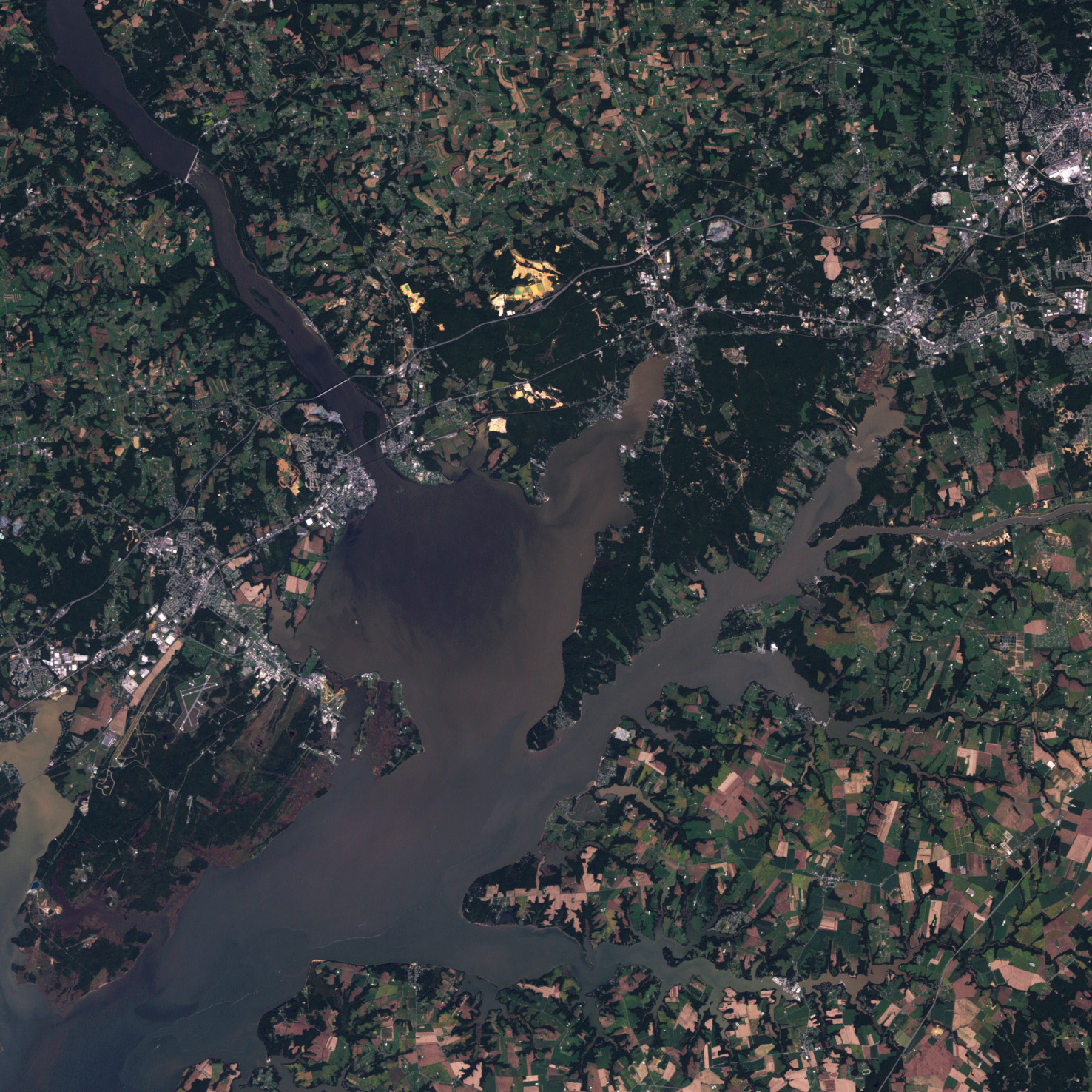
Satellite photo of the river (upper left) where it empties into the Chesapeake Bay (center)

=== Main Susquehanna flow ===
Downstream from the confluence of its branches in Northumberland, the river flows south past Selinsgrove, where it is joined by its Penns Creek tributary, and cuts through a water gap at the western end of Mahantongo Mountain. It receives the Juniata River from the northwest at Duncannon, then passes through its last water gap, the Susquehanna Gap through the Blue Mountain Ridge, just northwest of Harrisburg.

Downtown Harrisburg developed on the east side of the river, which is nearly a mile wide here. Harrisburg is the largest city located on the lower river, which flows southeast across South Central Pennsylvania, forming the border between York and Lancaster counties, and receiving Swatara Creek from the northeast. It crosses into northern Maryland approximately 30 miles (48 km) northeast of Baltimore and is joined by Octoraro Creek from the northeast and Deer Creek from the northwest. The river enters the northern end of the Chesapeake Bay at Havre de Grace. Concord Point Light was built here in 1827 to accommodate the increasing navigational traffic.

== Naming ==
"Susquehanna" may come from the Lenape word siskëwahane, meaning "Muddy River". Alternatively, it may come from another Lenape term, Sisa'we'hak'hanna, which means "Oyster River". Oyster beds were widespread in the bay near the mouth of the river, which the Lenape farmed. They left oyster shell middens at their villages. A third account translates "Susquehanna" from the Susquehannock language, of the Iroquoian family, as "the stream that falls toward the south" or "long-crooked-river".

The Lenape are an Algonquian-speaking Native American people who had communities ranging from coastal Connecticut through New York and Long Island, and further south into New Jersey and Delaware in the mid-Atlantic area. Their settlements in Pennsylvania included Con'esto'ga ("Roof-place" or "town", modern Washington Boro, Lancaster County), also called Ka'ot'sch'ie'ra ("Place-crawfish", modern Chickisalunga, Lancaster County), or Gasch'guch'sa ("Great-fall-in-river", modern Conewago Falls, Lancaster County). They were called Minquas ("quite different"), or Sisa'we'hak'hanna'lenno'wak ("Oyster-river-people") by others. The Lenape also called the area Sisa'we'hak'hanna'unk ("Oyster-river-place").

== History ==
The Susquehanna River has played an important role in the history of the United States. In the late 17th century, William Penn, the founder of the Province of Pennsylvania, negotiated with the Lenape (Delaware) to allow European settlement along the lower Delaware River—part of Lenapehoking, the ancestral homeland of the Lenape. He then negotiated with the Haudenosaunee (Iroquois) to open land for settlement along the Susquehanna. In the first half of the 18th century, thousands of German and Scots-Irish immigrants flooded into the lower Susquehanna River valley and established farms and villages. By the late 18th century, the river became an important transportation corridor as goods and foodstuffs were brought to markets downriver. In the early 19th century, the construction of canals beside the river allowed anthracite coal mined in Northeastern Pennsylvania to be shipped downriver to ports and cities along the Atlantic coast.

=== 17th century ===
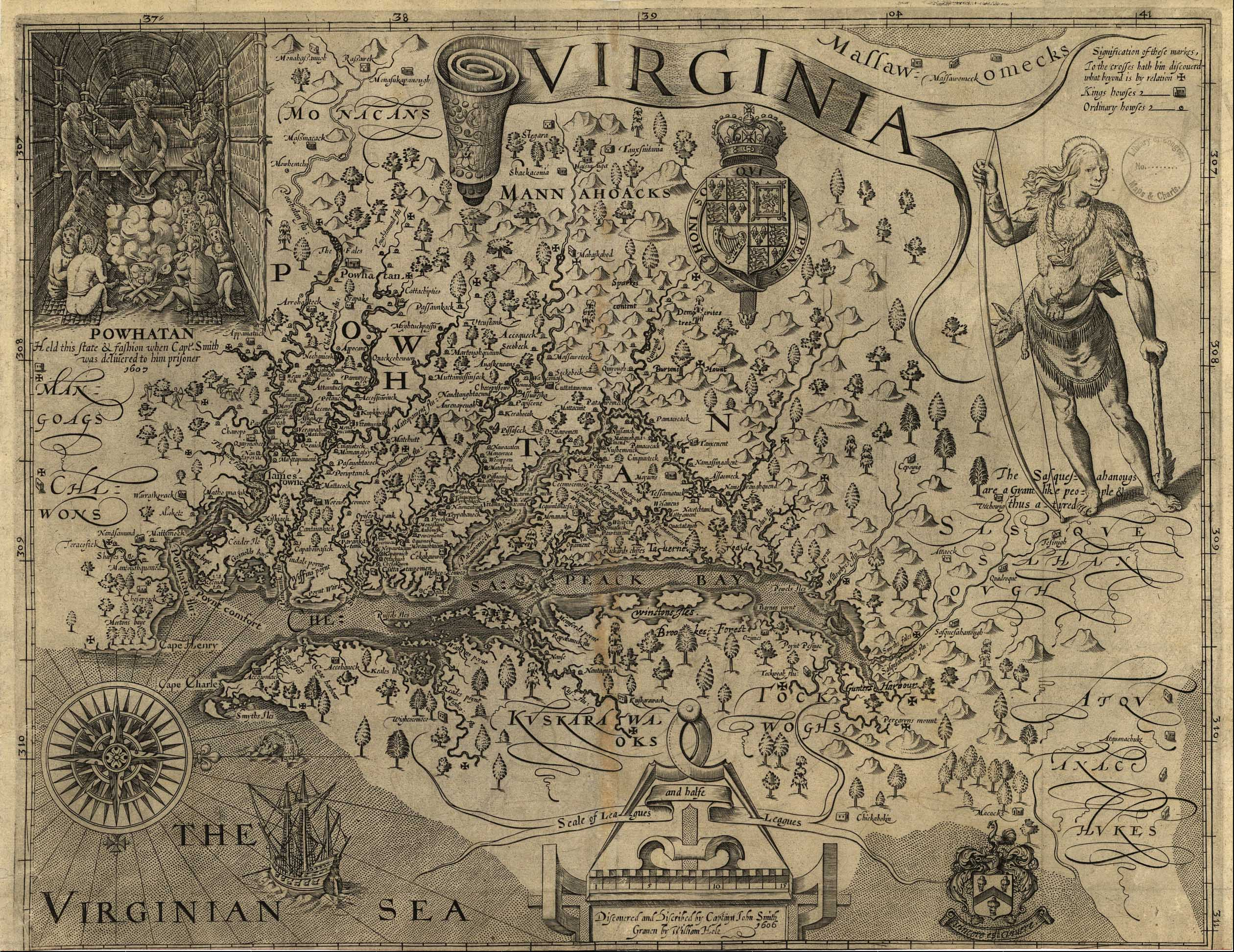
John Smith's Map of Virginia (1624). The Susquehanna River and a Susquehannock male are shown on the right.

At the time of European contact, the lower valley was occupied by the Susquehannock. They were first described by John Smith, who explored the upper reaches of Chesapeake Bay in 1608. The Susquehannock were active in the fur trade and established trading relationships with Virginia, New Sweden and New Netherland. They were in conflict with Maryland until a treaty was negotiated in 1652, and were the target of intermittent attacks by the Haudenosaunee. By the 1670s, their population had declined sharply as a result of disease and war. Some Susquehannock migrated south into Maryland while others were absorbed by the Haudenosaunee. In the late 1680s, a remnant group of Susquehannock established a settlement on the Conestoga River and became known as the Conestoga.

In 1615, French explorer Étienne Brûlé may have descended the Susquehanna River from its confluence with the Chemung River to Chesapeake Bay. Although he left no written record, Brûlé later reported to Samuel de Champlain that he had travelled "along a river which discharges on the coast of Florida," and that he had "proceeded along the said river to the sea, past islands and the coasts near them."

In the first half of the 17th century, the North Branch of the Susquehanna River may have been the home of the Scahentoarrhonon. The name appears in the Jesuit Relations in a list of Iroquoian-speaking nations and has been translated as "Nation of the Great Meadow." Pioneer ethnolinguist J. N. B. Hewitt believed that this referred to the Wyoming Valley and that the area was known as Scahentowanen by the Haudenosaunee. Archaeologists, however, have not been able to find any evidence of permanent Indigenous occupation in this area during the 17th century.

=== 18th century ===
Following the demise of the Susquehannock, the Haudenosaunee claimed control of the Susquehanna River valley by right of conquest. They allowed displaced Lenape, Shawnee, Conoy, Nanticoke, and Mahican groups fleeing European encroachment to settle in the Wyoming Valley and at Shamokin, located near the confluence of the West and North Branches. In 1728, the Haudenosaunee sent the Oneida leader Shikellamy to oversee the new settlements. Moravian missionaries began visiting the region in the 1740s and worked among these communities. Notable among the missionaries was David Zeisberger, who would spend more than sixty years living among the Lenape.

The influx of German and Scots-Irish immigrants in the 1720s led to the establishment of Lancaster County in 1729, and the founding of the town of Lancaster in 1734. The county straddled the Susquehanna, but settlement was limited to lands east of the river due to Pennsylvania's policy of prohibiting homesteading on unceded land, and because of a border dispute with Maryland that led to the armed skirmishes known as Cresap's War. In 1736, the Penn family purchased the right to the land from the Haudenosaunee to support Pennsylvania's claim, officially opening the territory to settlers. In 1738, King George II intervened and ordered both colonies to cease fighting. The border dispute was finally resolved in the 1760s with the surveying of the Mason-Dixon Line.

During the French and Indian War, the central Susquehanna valley became a target for raids by French-allied Shawnee and Lenape warriors. In October 1755, a Lenape war party attacked the isolated settlement of Penn's Creek, located just west of the main branch of the Susquehanna. 14 of the inhabitants were killed and 11 were taken captive. An expedition organized by John Harris to investigate the tragedy was ambushed near the river as it returned from Shamokin. Events such as the Penn's Creek Massacre forced many settlers to abandon their frontier farms and seek refuge in Lancaster and York.

In December 1763, driven by a desire for revenge, a Scots-Irish vigilante group known as the Paxton Boys massacred the remaining Susquehannock living on the Conestoga River, falsely believing they had aided the raiders during the war.

Overlapping royal charters had given both Pennsylvania and Connecticut claims to the river's North Branch, including the Wyoming Valley. In 1753, Connecticut speculators formed the Susquehanna Company to settle the area. The first settlers arrived in 1763 but fled after 20 were killed by the Lenape at the Mill Creek Massacre. When Connecticut settlers returned a few years later, both they and Pennsylvanian authorities built competing forts, leading to the Pennamite Wars.

In 1774, Connecticut established Westmoreland County, and controlled the area during the Revolutionary War. In the summer of 1778, a combined force of Loyalist soldiers and Seneca warriors led by Major John Butler descended the Susquehanna River to attack settlements in the Wyoming Valley. On July 3, most of the Patriot militiamen who marched out to meet them were killed at the Battle of Wyoming. Widespread looting and burning of buildings occurred throughout the valley in the days after the battle. Non-combatants were not harmed but fled across the Pocono Mountains or down the Susquehanna River to Fort Augusta. News of the massacre triggered the Big Runaway, a mass panic in which thousands of settlers along the river's West Branch abandoned their homes and headed for safety.

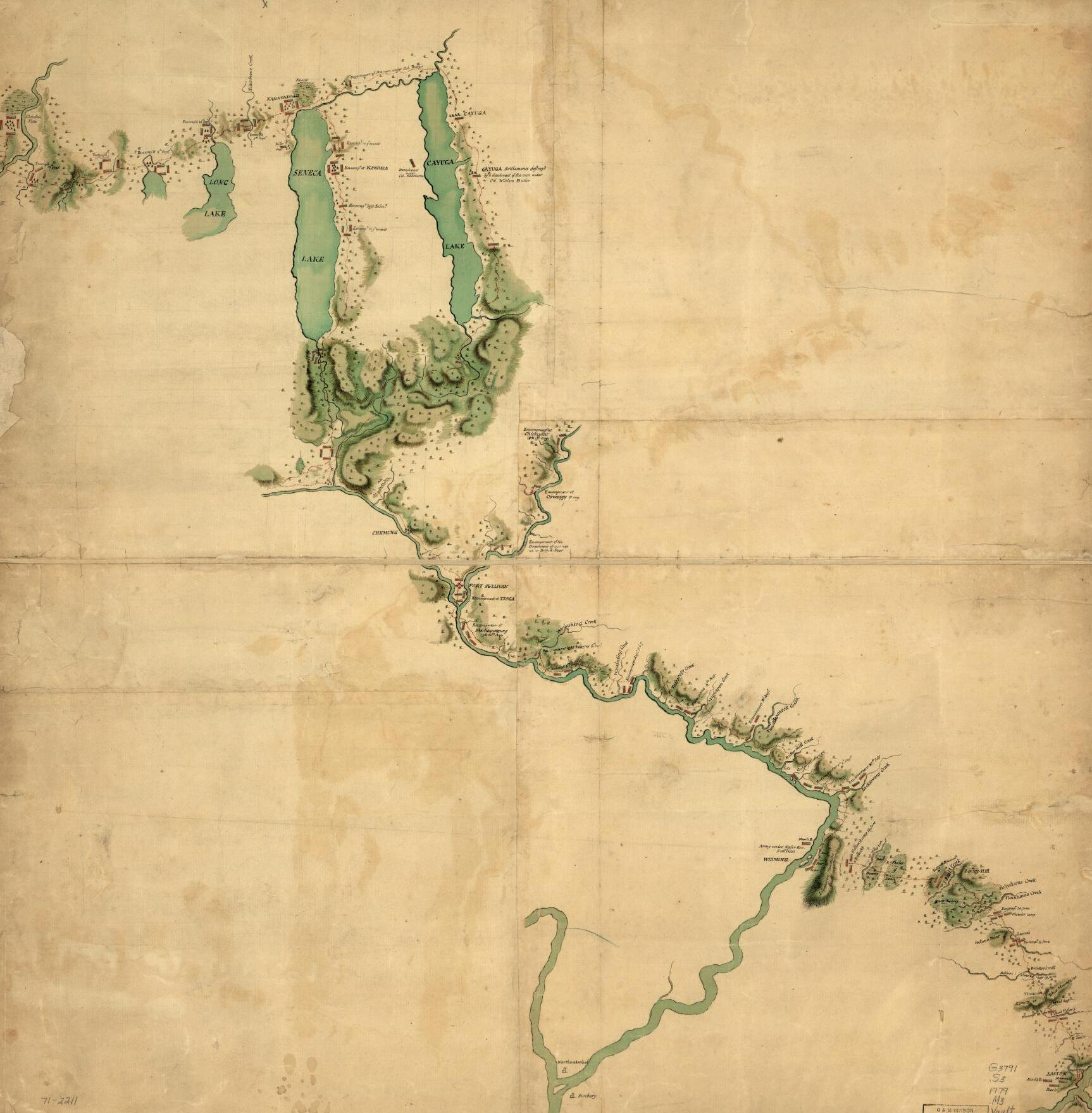
Map showing the route of the Sullivan Expedition in 1779

In response to attacks on frontier settlements such as Cobleskill, German Flatts, the Wyoming Valley, and Cherry Valley, General George Washington ordered a retaliatory scorched-earth campaign in 1779. As part of this offensive, Brigadier General James Clinton led a brigade from Canajoharie on the Mohawk River, down the Susquehanna from its source at Otsego Lake. His men made the upper river temporarily navigable by damming the lake's outlet, then breaking the dam to float their flotilla downstream on the sudden torrent—an event James Fenimore Cooper later described in his 1823 novel The Pioneers.

At Tioga Point (now Athens, Pennsylvania), Clinton rendezvoused with Major General John Sullivan's three brigades, which had marched north from Easton through the Wyoming Valley. From there, the combined army ascended the Chemung River, defeating Butler's Loyalist troops and their Indigenous allies at the Battle of Newtown. The expedition then headed north into Seneca and Cayuga territory, destroying 40 villages and winter food stores, which forced thousands of displaced people to flee to Fort Niagara. Hundreds died from exposure and starvation that winter.

In December 1782, a Continental Congress commission issued the Decree of Trenton, awarding Pennsylvania jurisdiction over the territory north of the 41st parallel claimed by both Pennsylvania and Connecticut. Two years later, Pennsylvania militia evicted Connecticut settlers from their homes, sparking the Third Pennamite War. Peace was achieved through the Confirming Act of 1787, a compromise in which Pennsylvania maintained political control over the territory but validated the land titles of the original Connecticut settlers.

In 1790, Colonel Timothy Matlack, Samuel Maclay and John Adlum were commissioned by the Pennsylvania government to survey the headwaters of the West Branch. Their goal was to find a route for a canal to connect the West Branch with the Allegheny River, which flowed past Pittsburgh to the Ohio River. In 1792, construction began on the Union Canal in order to provide a water link between the Susquehanna and Philadelphia.

In 1794, English poets Samuel Taylor Coleridge and Robert Southey formulated a plan for a "Pantisocracy"—a utopian community based on equal government by all. Along with their friend Robert Lovell, they planned to marry three sisters from the Fricker family and emigrate to the banks of the Susquehanna River in Pennsylvania. While the marriages did take place—with Lovell, Coleridge, and Southey respectively marrying Mary, Sarah, and Edith Fricker—the idea fell apart before they could leave when Southey backed out to pursue law and visit an uncle in Portugal.

=== 19th century ===
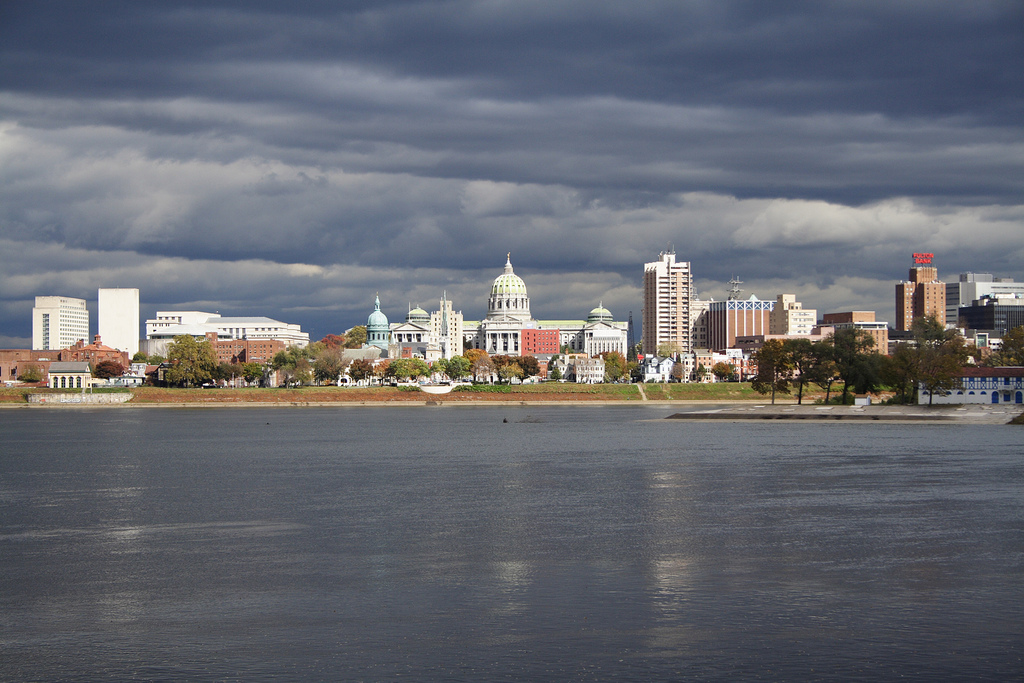
Harrisburg, with the Pennsylvania State Capitol dome, seen from Wormleysburg

In the 19th century, many industrial centers developed along the Susquehanna, using its water power to drive mills and coal machinery, to cool machines, and as a waterway for the transport of raw and manufactured goods. In 1812, Harrisburg, laid out by John Harris in 1785, became the state capital replacing Lancaster.

In 1833, John B. Jervis began a canal system to extend the Chenango River and connect the waters of the Susquehanna from Chenango Point to the Erie Canal, which ran through the Mohawk Valley of New York, ultimately connecting with Lake Erie through the Wood Canal. In October 1836, water from the Susquehanna was connected to the Erie Canal at Utica, New York. Water travel was the main form of transportation during that era. The Erie Canal dramatically expanded trade between communities around the Great Lakes and markets in New York and Pennsylvania. With the expansion of construction of railroad lines, canal-transport became unprofitable, as it could not compete in speed or flexibility. Boats had to climb a net height of 1,009 feet (308 m) between basins, requiring the use of more than 100 water locks, which were too expensive to be maintained under the new competition.

The Susquehanna River figures in the history of the Latter Day Saint movement. It holds that Joseph Smith and Oliver Cowdery received the priesthood from heavenly beings at a site along the Susquehanna and performed their first baptisms of Latter Day Saints in the North Branch of the river. Smith and Cowdery said that they were visited on May 15, 1829, by the resurrected John the Baptist and given the Aaronic priesthood. Following his visit, Smith and Cowdery baptized each other in the river. Later that year, they said they were visited near the river by the apostles Peter, James and John. Both events took place in unspecified locations near the river's shore in Susquehanna County, Pennsylvania.

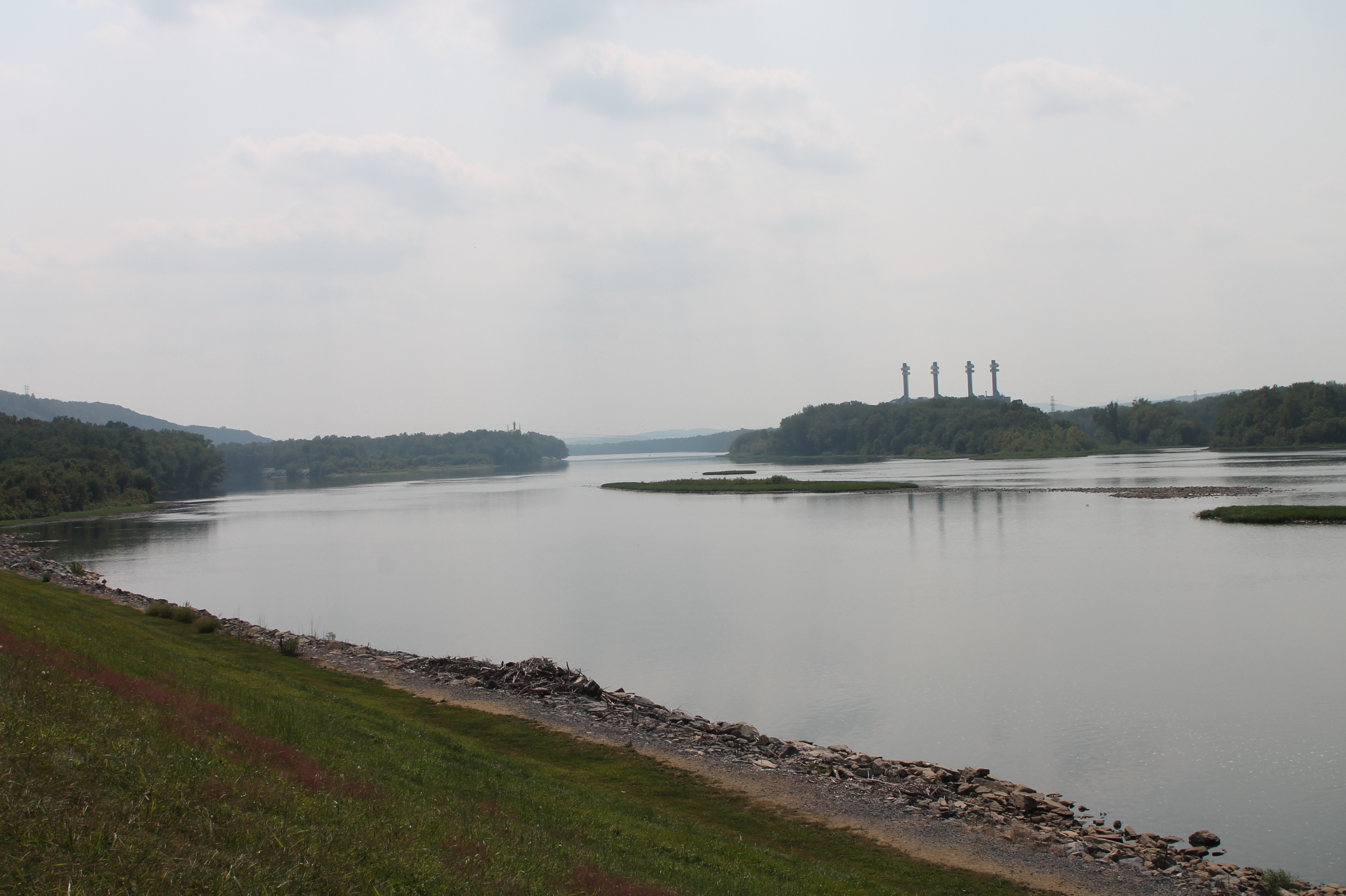
Looking downriver at Sunbury, Pennsylvania

During the Civil War's 1863 Gettysburg campaign, Union Major General Darius N. Couch, commander of the Department of the Susquehanna, resolved that Robert E. Lee's Confederate Army of Northern Virginia would not cross the Susquehanna. He positioned militia units under Major Granville Haller to protect key bridges in Harrisburg and Wrightsville, as well as nearby fords. Confederate forces reached the river at several locations in Cumberland and York counties.

=== 20th century ===
In 1972, the remnants of Hurricane Agnes stalled over the New York-Pennsylvania border, dropping as much as 20 inches (510 mm) of rain on the hilly lands. Much of that precipitation was received into the Susquehanna from its western tributaries, and the valley suffered disastrous flooding. Wilkes-Barre, Pennsylvania, was among the hardest-hit communities and the capital Harrisburg was flooded. The Chesapeake Bay received so much fresh water that it altered the ecosystem, killing much of the marine life that depended on saltwater.

In 2006, a flood caused by a stalled jet stream-driven storm system, affected portions of the river system. The worst affected area was Binghamton, New York, where record-setting flood levels forced the evacuation of thousands of residents.

In September 2011 the Susquehanna River and its communities were hit by Tropical Storm Lee, which caused the worst flooding since Agnes in 1972.

== Bridges, ferries, canals, and dams ==
The Susquehanna River is important in the transportation history of the United States. Before the Port Deposit Bridge opened in 1818, the river formed a barrier between the northern and southern states, as it could be crossed only by ferry. The earliest dams were constructed to support ferry operations in low water. The presence of many rapids in the river meant that while commercial traffic could navigate down the river in the high waters of the spring thaws, nothing could move up.

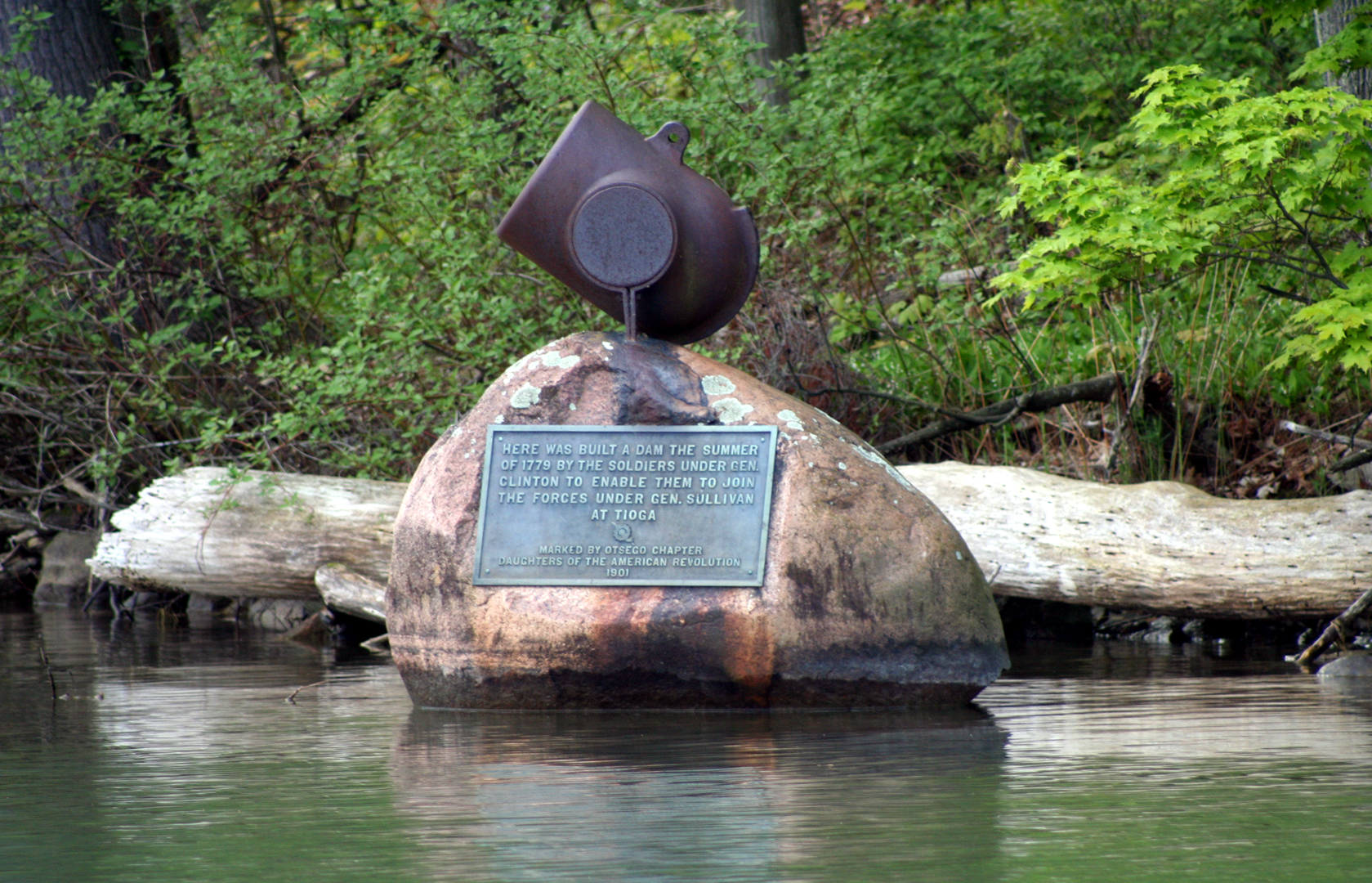
Monument at the site of General James Clinton's dam at the river's source at Otsego Lake in Cooperstown, New York

The Susquehanna was improved by navigations throughout the 1820s and 1830s as the Pennsylvania Canal. Together with facilities of the Allegheny Portage Railroad, loaded barges were transferred from the canal and hoisted across the mountain ridge into the Pittsburgh area with access to the Monongahela, Allegheny Rivers and their confluence into the Ohio River flowing southwest towards the Mississippi River. The 82-mile (132 km) Union Canal was completed in 1828 to connect the Schuylkill River (flowing southeast towards the Delaware River at Philadelphia) at Reading westwards to the Susquehanna River above the state capital of Harrisburg. Competition from faster transport via the railroad industry by the 1850s resulted in reducing the reliance on the river for transport.

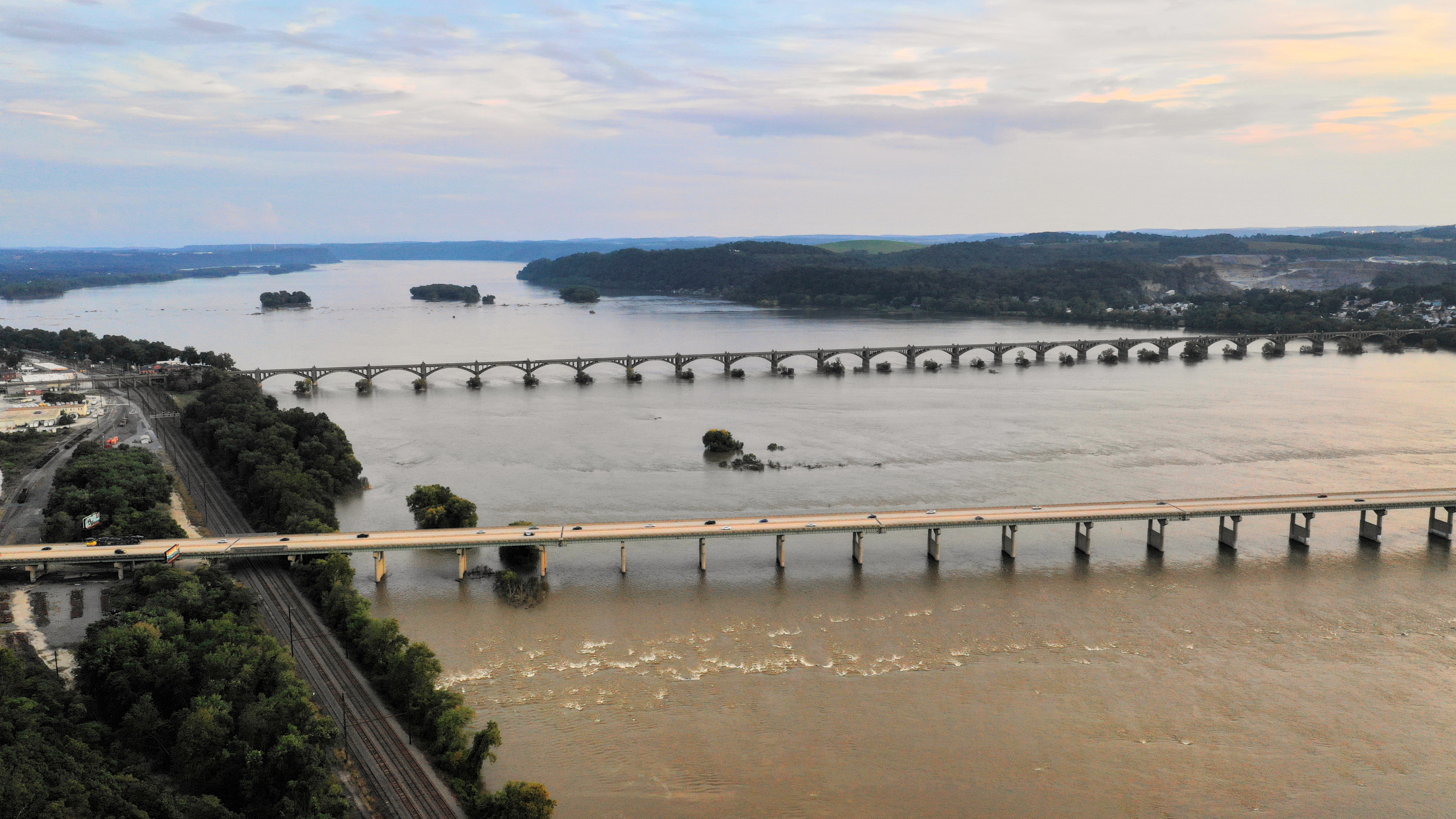
An aerial view looking south over the Wrights Ferry Bridge (front) and the Veterans Memorial Bridge (behind). Columbia, Pennsylvania, is located off the eastern side of the river (left) and Wrightsville, Pennsylvania, is located on the western side (right).

Two canal systems were constructed on the lower Susquehanna to bypass the rapids. The first was the Susquehanna Canal, also called the Conowingo Canal or the Port Deposit Canal, completed in 1802 by a Maryland company known as the Proprietors of the Susquehanna Canal. The second was the much longer and more successful Susquehanna and Tidewater Canal. The canals required dams to provide canal water and navigation pools.

As the industrial age progressed, bridges replaced ferries, and railroads replaced canals. The railroads were often constructed on top of the canal right-of-way along the river. Many canal remnants can be seen; for example, in Havre de Grace, Maryland, along US Route 15 in Pennsylvania, and in upstate New York at various locations. These latter remnants are parts of the upstream divisions of the Pennsylvania Canal, of privately funded canals, and of canals in the New York system.

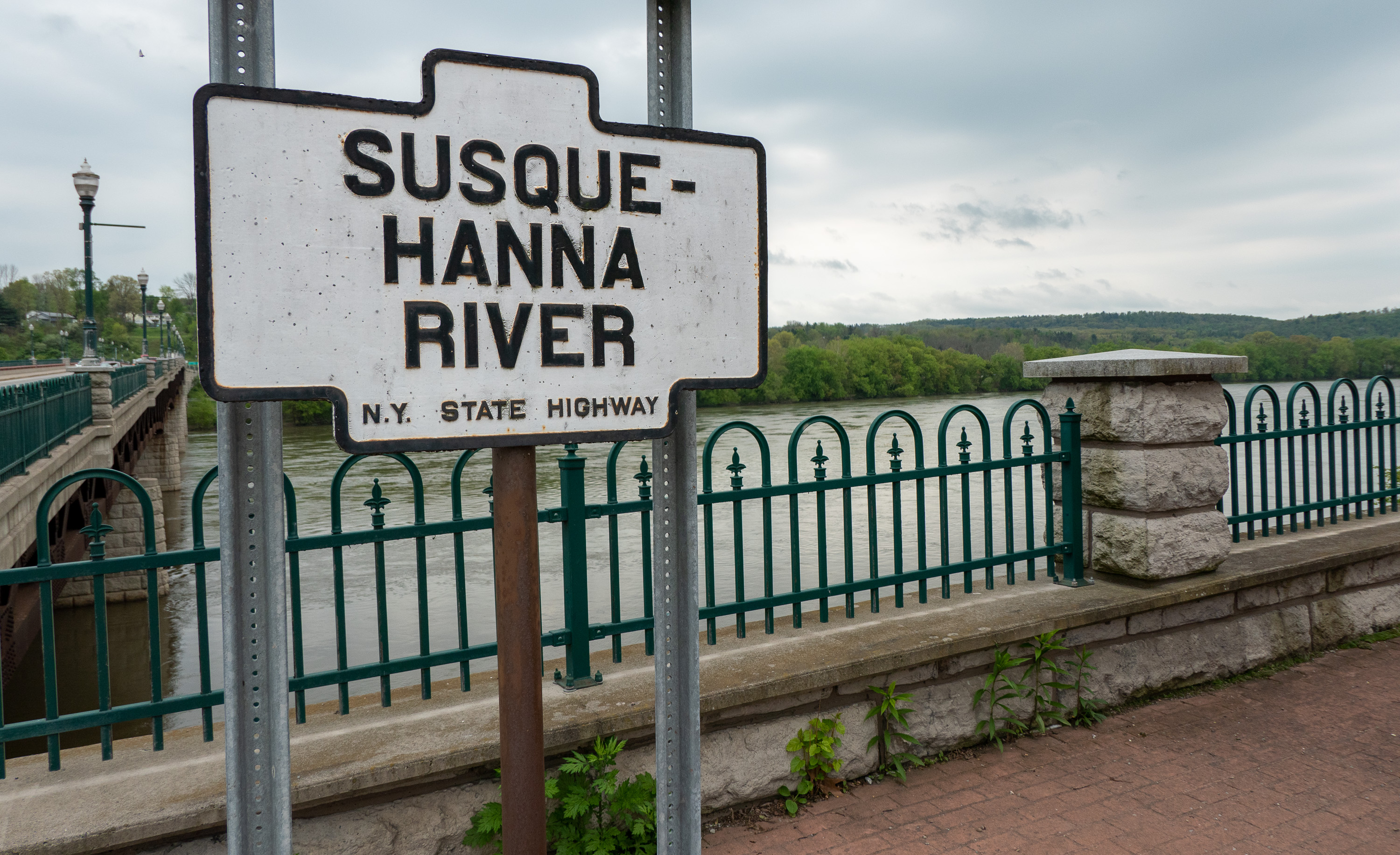
A bridge crosses the Susquehanna at Owego, New York

Today 200 bridges cross the Susquehanna. The Rockville Bridge, which crosses the river from Harrisburg to Marysville, Pennsylvania, is the longest stone masonry arch bridge in the world. It was built by the Pennsylvania Railroad in 1902, replacing an earlier iron bridge. Two seasonal ferries operate across the Susquehanna. The Millersburg Ferry at Millersburg, Pennsylvania, is a practical ferry for up to four vehicles and 50 passengers, while the Pride of the Susquehanna, based at Harrisburg, provides a passenger-only pleasure cruise.

Most of the canals have been filled in or are partially preserved as a part of historical parks. Dams generally are used to generate power or to provide lakes for recreation.

== Environmental threats ==
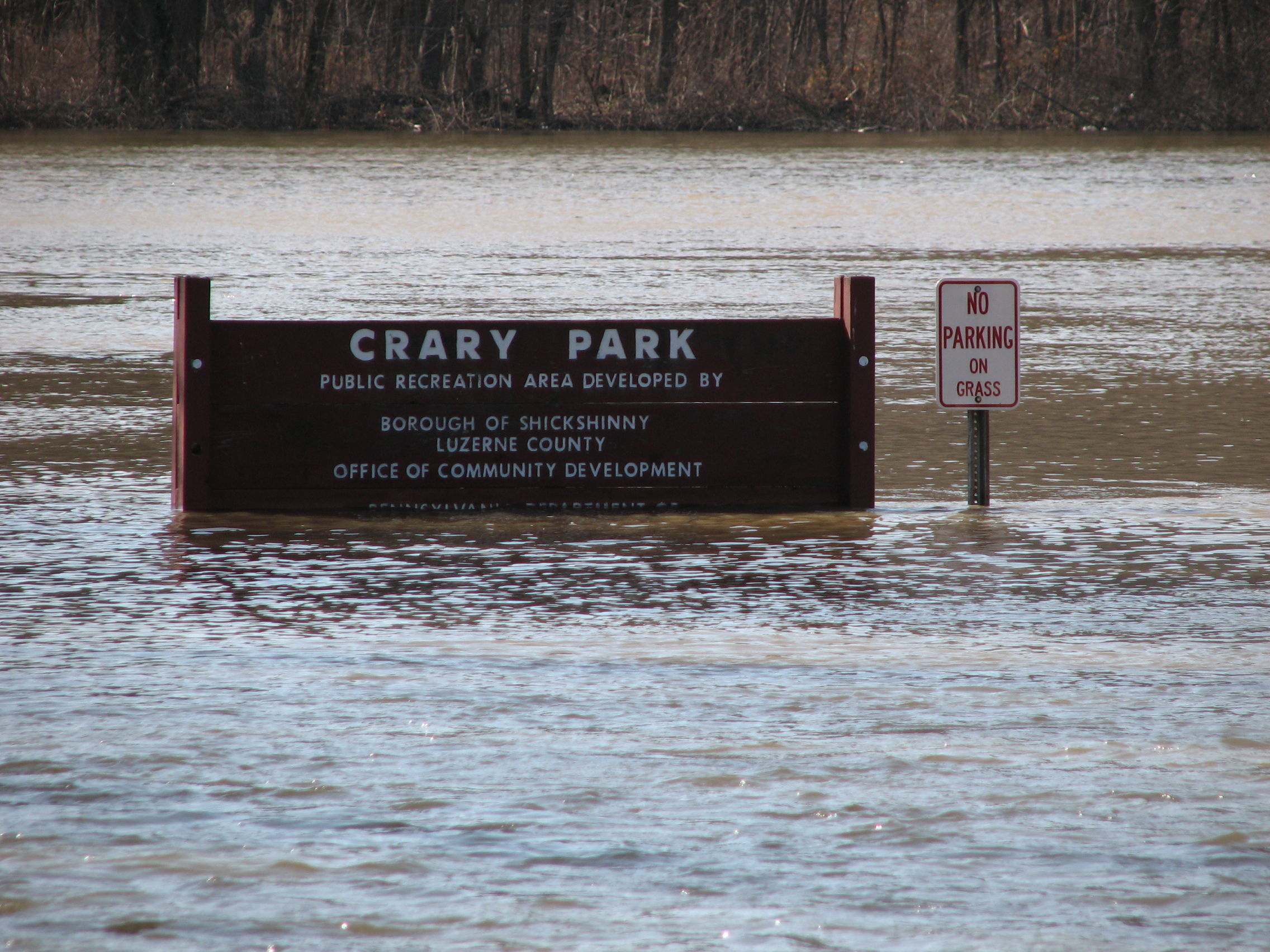
In March 2011, Crary Park in Shickshinny, Pennsylvania, was inundated with a flood when the river rose above 27 feet at Wilkes-Barre. Six months later, the town was devastated by a 42-foot record flood.

The environmental group American Rivers named the Susquehanna "America's Most Endangered River for 2005" because of the excessive pollution it receives. Most of the pollution in the river is caused by excess animal manure from farming, agricultural runoff, urban and suburban stormwater runoff, and raw or inadequately treated sewage. In 2003 the river contributed 50% of the freshwater, 44% of the nitrogen, 21% of the phosphorus, and 21% of the sediment flowing into the Chesapeake Bay.

It was designated as one of the American Heritage Rivers in 1997. The designation provides for technical assistance from federal agencies to state and local governments working in the Susquehanna watershed.

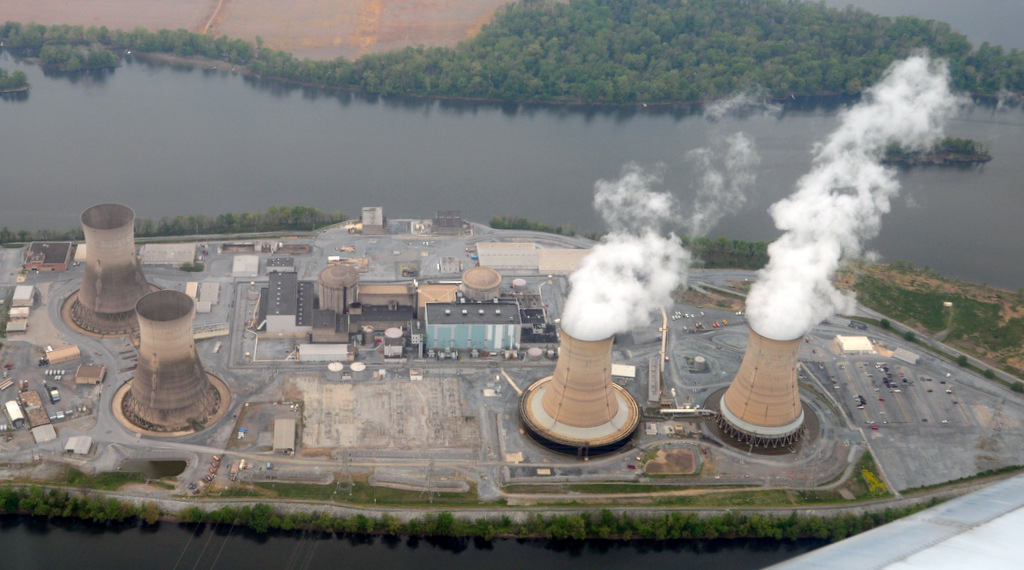
Three Mile Island Nuclear Generating Station on the Susquehanna River

Another environmental concern is radioactivity released during the 1979 Three Mile Island accident. However, extensive radionuclide studies over a 25-year period from 1979 through 2003, confirm that the Three Mile Island accident has not resulted in any harmful radiation effects. The areas in and along a 262-km length of the Susquehanna River in Pennsylvania were monitored for the presence of radioactive materials. This study began two months after the 1979 Three Mile Island (TMI) partial reactor meltdown; it spanned the next 25 years. Monitoring points included stations at the PPL Susquehanna and TMI nuclear power plants. Monthly gamma measurements documented concentrations of radionuclides from natural and anthropogenic sources. During this study, various series of gamma-emitting radionuclide concentration measurements were made in many general categories of animals, plants, and other inorganic matter, both within and near the river. Sampling began in 1979 before the first start-up of the PPL Susquehanna power plant. Although all species were not continuously monitored for the entire period, an extensive database was compiled. In May 1986, ongoing measurements from several monitoring stations along the river near Three Mile Island, Peach Bottom and Calvert Cliffs detected iodine-131 beta particles attributable to fallout from the Chernobyl nuclear accident. The remaining reactor at Three Mile Island Nuclear Generating Station was shut down in 2019.

In 2015, a smallmouth bass with a rare, cancerous tumor was caught from the river, raising renewed concerns about toxic materials and water pollution. The Environmental Protection Agency reported, "we do not have sufficient data at this time to scientifically support listing the main stem of the Susquehanna as impaired."

== Recreation ==
The Susquehanna River has attracted boaters who watch or fish for its migratory species. Many tourists and local residents use the Susquehanna in the summer for recreation purposes such as kayaking, canoeing, and motor-boating. Due to the high volume of smallmouth bass in the river, it is the host of numerous bass fishing tournaments each year and is regarded by many as one of the premier bass fishing rivers in North America. Canoe races are held annually on various sections of the river, such as the amateur race held in Oneonta, New York.

Susquehanna rowing and paddling have a long history. Starting in 1874, rowers from Shamokin Dam, Pennsylvania, raced men from Sunbury. The General Clinton Canoe Regatta, a 70-mile (110 km) flat-water race, takes place each year in Bainbridge, New York, on Memorial Day weekend. Binghamton University Crew and Hiawatha Island Boat Club are also located on the river, in the Southern Tier of New York.

The Appalachian Trail passes through Duncannon, Pennsylvania, and crosses the Susquehanna on the Clarks Ferry Bridge.

== See also ==
- City Island (Pennsylvania)
- List of crossings of the Susquehanna River
- Garrett Island (Maryland)
- McCormick Island
- List of rivers of Maryland
- List of rivers of New York
- List of rivers of Pennsylvania
- Spades Wharf Island
- Three Mile Island accident
