= Mollie Woods Hare =

American educator (1881–1956)

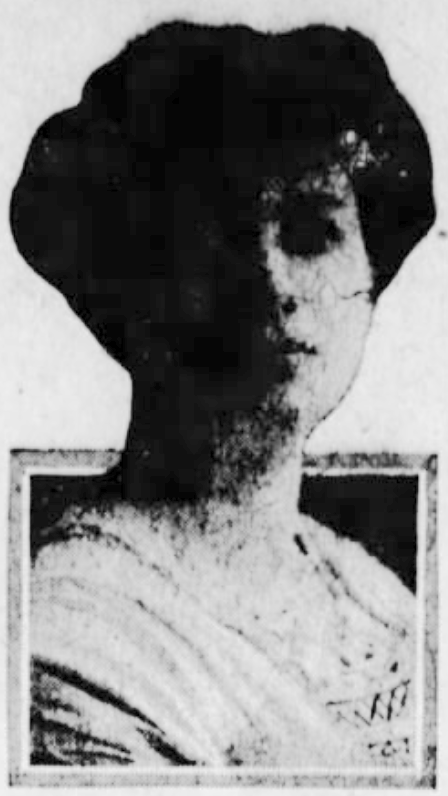
- Mollie A. Woods (later Hare), from a 1917 newspaper
- Born: Mollie Ainscow Woods; August 30, 1881; Duncannon, Pennsylvania, U.S.
- Died: January 19, 1956 (aged 74); Langhorne, Pennsylvania, U.S.
- Occupation: Educator

Mollie Woods Hare (August 30, 1881 – January 19, 1956) was an American educator. In 1913, she founded the Woods Schools in Langhorne, Pennsylvania, serving students with intellectual disabilities.

== Early life ==
Mollie Ainscow Woods was born in Duncannon, Pennsylvania, the daughter of McClellan Woods and Jean (Jennie) Harkinson Woods. She trained as a teacher at a normal school in Philadelphia, with further studies under Edward Ransom Johnstone at the Vineland Training School in New Jersey.

== Career ==
In 1902, Woods became principal of a Philadelphia public school for "retarded and truant boys". In 1913, Woods and her sister, a nurse, founded the Woods Schools to educate students with intellectual disabilities. It was located in their home in Roslyn, Pennsylvania until 1921, then in Langhorne. On the later, larger campus, she added housing and a Child Research Clinic to expand the school's mission. There were more than 40 buildings in the schools' complex by 1948. The schools became a private non-profit run by a board of trustees when she retired as its director in 1949.

In 1939, Hare received an honorary degree from Temple University, and traveled to Geneva as a delegate to the Congress of the International Association for the Education of Exceptional Children.

== Personal life and legacy ==
Mollie A. Woods married John Ridgeway Hare in 1919. Her husband died in 1944, and she died in 1956, at the age of 74, in Langhorne. A historical marker about Hare was placed in Langhorne in 2010. The Woods Schools continued after her death, though changing professional practices, laws, and social expectations shaped the school over the decades. Woods Services is now a national network of programs for disabled clients of all ages. Woods Services gives an annual Mollie Award, named for Hare, to outstanding employees.
