= Buffalo Township, Perry County, Pennsylvania =

Township in Pennsylvania, US

Coordinates: 40°31′00″N 77°00′59″W

- Township
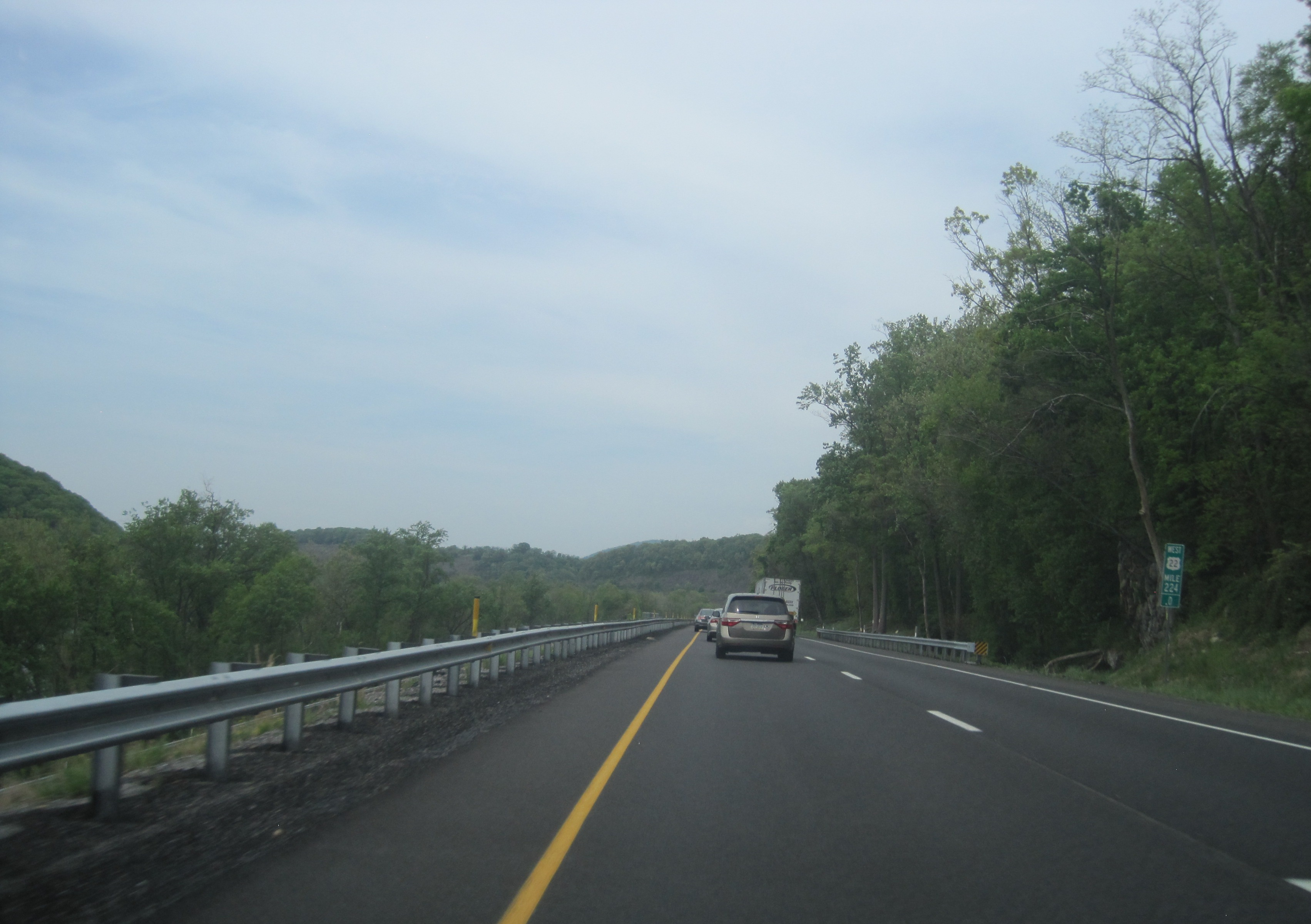
- Westbound US 22/US 322 in Buffalo Township

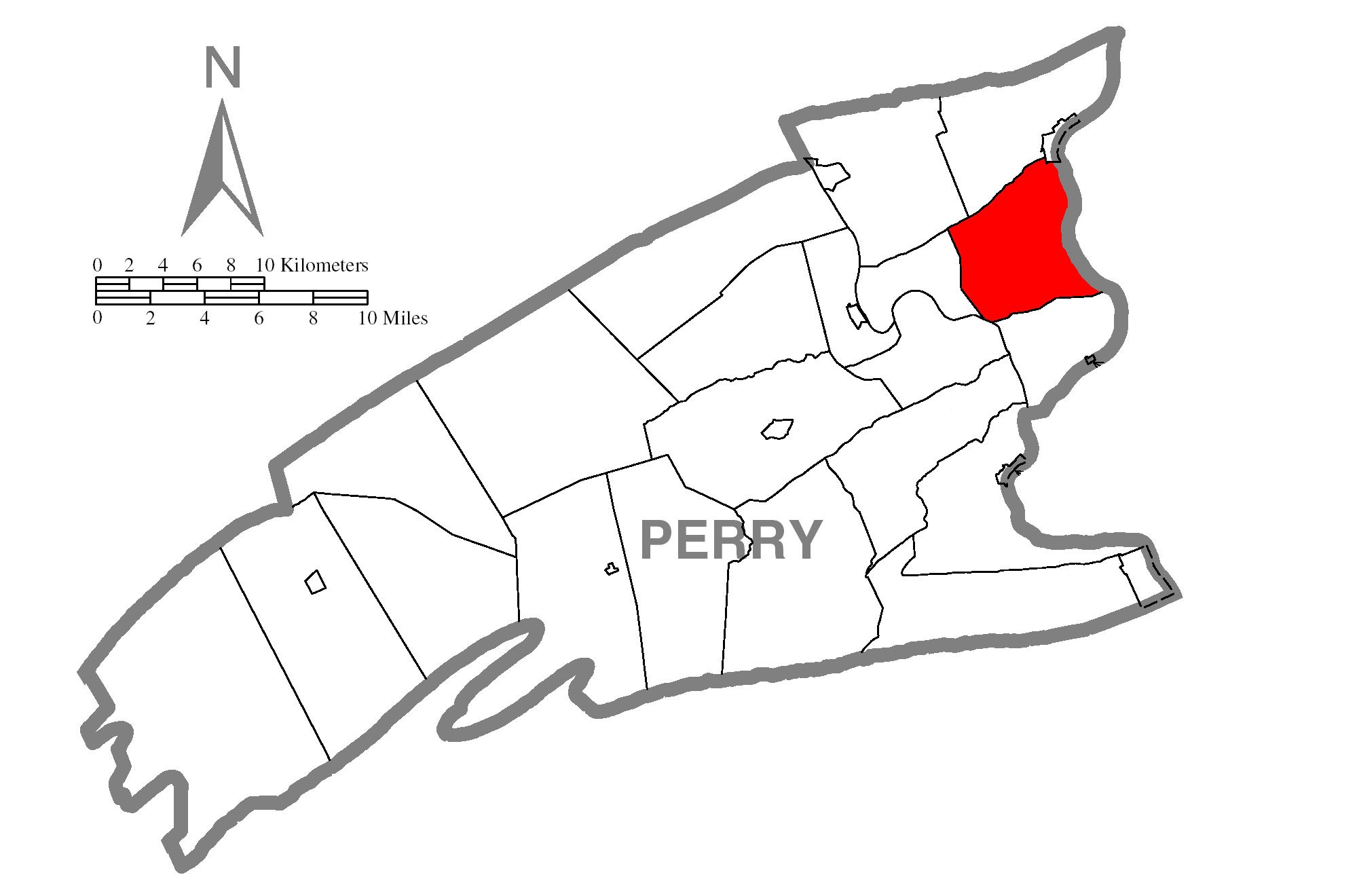
- Map of Perry County, Pennsylvania highlighting Buffalo Township

- Map of Perry County, Pennsylvania
- Country: United States
- State: Pennsylvania
- County: Perry
- Settled: 1772
- Incorporated: 1799

Area
  - Total: 20.17 sq mi (52.24 km^{2})
  - Land: 20.10 sq mi (52.07 km^{2})
  - Water: 0.069 sq mi (0.18 km^{2})

Population (2020)
  - Total: 1,225 ▲
  - Estimate (2023): 1,236
  - Density: 60.6/sq mi (23.41/km^{2})
- Time zone: UTC-5 (Eastern (EST))
  - Summer (DST): UTC-4 (EDT)
- Area code: 717
- FIPS code: 42-099-10008
- Website: https://www.perrybuffalotwp.org/

Buffalo Township is a township in Perry County, Pennsylvania, United States. The population was 1,225 at the 2020 census.

== History ==
The Millersburg Ferry was added to the National Register of Historic Places in 2006.

== Geography ==
According to the United States Census Bureau, the township has a total area of 20.2 square miles (52 km^{2}), of which 20.2 square miles (52 km^{2}) is land and 0.04 square miles (0.10 km^{2}) (0.15%) is water.

== Demographics ==
Historical population
Census	Pop.	Note	%±
2010	1,219		—
2020	1,225		0.5%
2023 (est.)	1,236		0.9%
U.S. Decennial Census

As of the census of 2010, there were 1219 people, 420 households, and 325 families residing in the township. The population density was 55.8 inhabitants per square mile (21.5/km^{2}). There were 472 housing units at an average density of 23.3/sq mi (9.0/km^{2}). The racial makeup of the township was 99.29% White, 0.09% Asian, 0.27% from other races, and 0.35% from two or more races. Hispanic or Latino of any race were 0.80% of the population.

There were 420 households, out of which 34.8% had children under the age of 18 living with them, 66.4% were married couples living together, 6.0% had a female householder with no husband present, and 22.6% were non-families. 19.5% of all households were made up of individuals, and 6.9% had someone living alone who was 65 years of age or older. The average household size was 2.69 and the average family size was 3.10.

In the township the population was spread out, with 25.1% under the age of 18, 8.2% from 18 to 24, 28.9% from 25 to 44, 25.7% from 45 to 64, and 12.1% who were 65 years of age or older. The median age was 39 years. For every 100 females, there were 102.5 males. For every 100 females age 18 and over, there were 103.1 males.

The median income for a household in the township was $47,011, and the median income for a family was $49,563. Males had a median income of $37,039 versus $26,250 for females. The per capita income for the township was $21,434. About 3.1% of families and 4.0% of the population were below the poverty line, including 1.7% of those under age 18 and 4.4% of those age 65 or over.
