= Duncannon, Pennsylvania =

Borough in Pennsylvania, US

- Borough
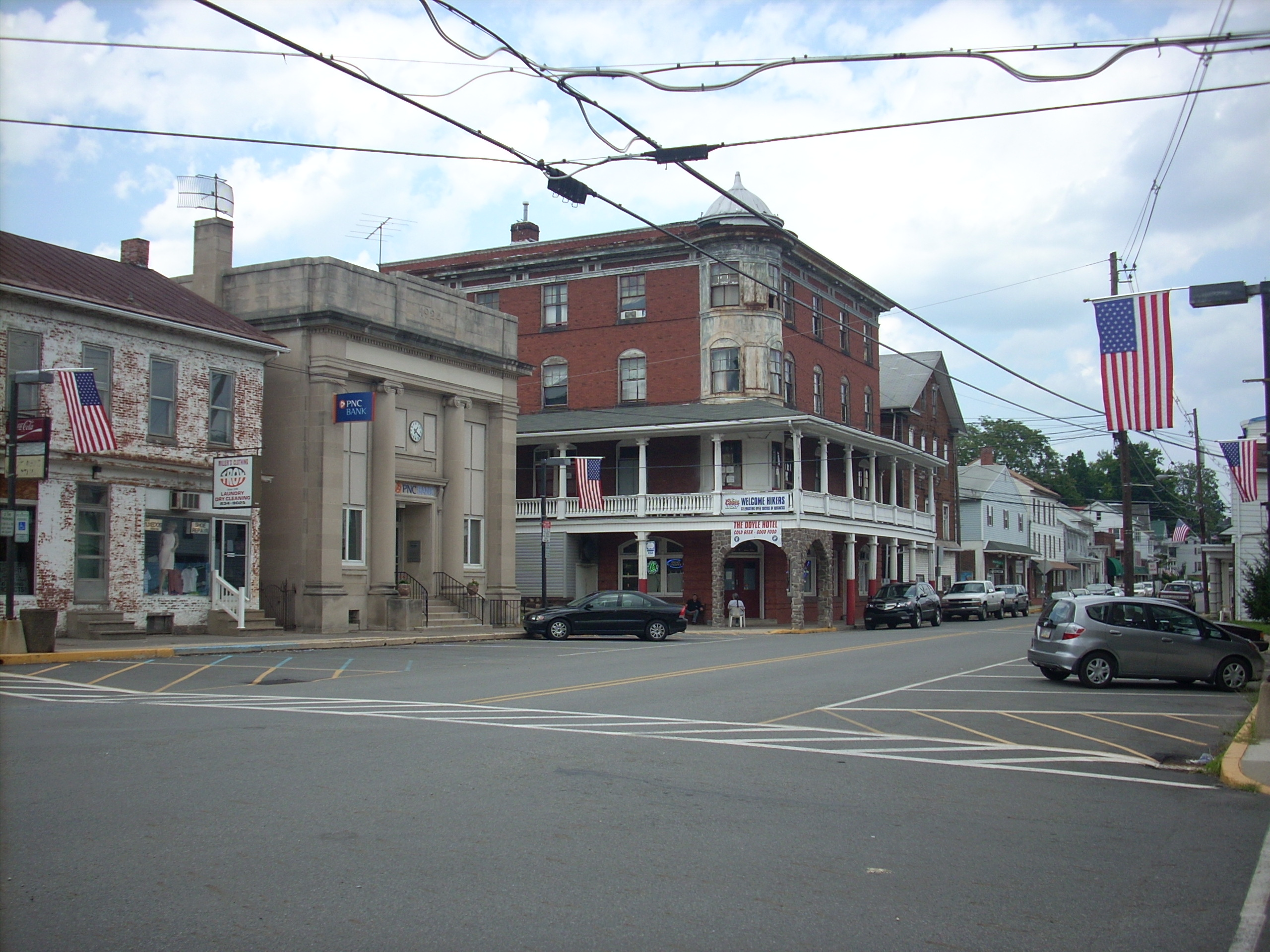
- Duncannon

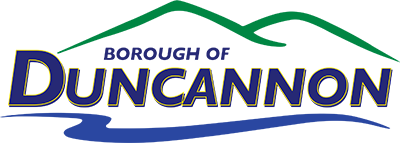
- Logo

- Location of Duncannon in Perry County, Pennsylvania.

- Location within Pennsylvania Location within the United States
- Coordinates: 40°23′38″N 77°01′14″W
- Country: United States
- State: Pennsylvania
- County: Perry
- Settled: 1792
- Incorporated: 1844

Area
  - Total: 0.41 sq mi (1.05 km^{2})
  - Land: 0.41 sq mi (1.05 km^{2})
  - Water: 0 sq mi (0.00 km^{2})
- Elevation (center of borough): 370 ft (110 m)
- Highest elevation (western edge of borough): 506 ft (154 m)
- Lowest elevation (Susquehanna River): 340 ft (100 m)

Population (2020)
  - Total: 1,478
  - Density: 3,630.5/sq mi (1,401.74/km^{2})
- Time zone: UTC-5 (Eastern (EST))
  - Summer (DST): UTC-4 (EDT)
- Zip code: 17020
- Area code: 717
- FIPS code: 42-20240
- Website: Borough's website

Duncannon is a borough in Perry County, Pennsylvania, United States. The population was 1,473 at the 2020 census. It is part of the Harrisburg–Carlisle Metropolitan Statistical Area. The center of population of Pennsylvania is located in Duncannon. Lightning Guider Sleds were manufactured in Duncannon from 1904 until 1988. The Appalachian Trail makes its way through the town, going on various streets, and runs mainly along North High Street. It comes off the mountain at 40.3813, -77.0292 lat/long, onto Inn Road.

== History ==
Duncannon was originally called Petersburg, and under the latter name was laid out in 1792. The present name is derived from Duncan's Island in the Susquehanna River.

The Puritan missionary David Brainerd visited the area in the 1740s. In his journal he describes his trip on the Susquehanna and his brief stay with an Indian tribe on Duncan's Island, across the river from present-day Duncannon.

== Geography ==
Duncannon is located at 40°23′38″N 77°1′44″W (40.393986, -77.028891). According to the U.S. Census Bureau, the borough has a total area of 0.4 square miles (1.0 km^{2}), all land.

== Demographics ==
Historical population
Census	Pop.	Note	%±
1870	960		—
1880	1,027		7.0%
1890	1,074		4.6%
1900	1,661		54.7%
1910	1,474		−11.3%
1920	1,679		13.9%
1930	1,732		3.2%
1940	1,707		−1.4%
1950	1,852		8.5%
1960	1,800		−2.8%
1970	1,739		−3.4%
1980	1,645		−5.4%
1990	1,450		−11.9%
2000	1,508		4.0%
2010	1,522		0.9%
2020	1,478		−2.9%
2021 (est.)	1,468	▼	−0.7%

As of the census of 2000, there were 1,508 people, 667 households, and 386 families residing in the borough. The population density was 3,566.5 inhabitants per square mile (1,377.0/km^{2}). There were 714 housing units at an average density of 1,688.7 per square mile (652.0/km^{2}). The racial makeup of the borough was 98.28% White, 0.53% African American, 0.07% Asian, 0.73% from other races, and 0.40% from two or more races. Hispanic or Latino of any race were 1.59% of the population.

There were 667 households, out of which 25.8% had children under the age of 18 living with them, 41.8% were married couples living together, 12.3% had a female householder with no husband present, and 42.1% were non-families. 36.1% of all households were made up of individuals, and 16.8% had someone living alone who was 65 years of age or older. The average household size was 2.26 and the average family size was 2.94.

In the borough the population was spread out, with 23.1% under the age of 18, 9.6% from 18 to 24, 28.7% from 25 to 44, 20.3% from 45 to 64, and 18.3% who were 65 years of age or older. The median age was 38 years. For every 100 females, there were 91.1 males. For every 100 females age 18 and over, there were 85.3 males.

The median income for a household in the borough was $33,000, and the median income for a family was $38,750. Males had a median income of $31,643 versus $21,477 for females. The per capita income for the borough was $15,883. About 6.2% of families and 8.5% of the population were below the poverty line, including 8.0% of those under age 18 and 8.2% of those age 65 or over.

== Culture ==
On S. Market Street, there is a mural with various artistic depictions of life and scenery in Duncannon, the Perry County area, Pennsylvania as a whole, and even of the entire United States.

A high percentage of the population identifies as Christian, and denominations with churches within Duncannon include Lutheranism, United Church of Christ, Assembly of God, Presbyterianism, Catholicism, and the Church of God. Many other churches, including multiple Methodist churches, are located within a few miles of the borough.

== Notable people ==
- Spencer Charters, character actor
- Marie Doro, silent screen actress
- Mollie Woods Hare, educator
- William J. Kirkpatrick (1838-1921, hymnwriter
- Robert Noaker, racing driver
- Langhorne Wister (1834–1891), Union army officer

== Gallery ==
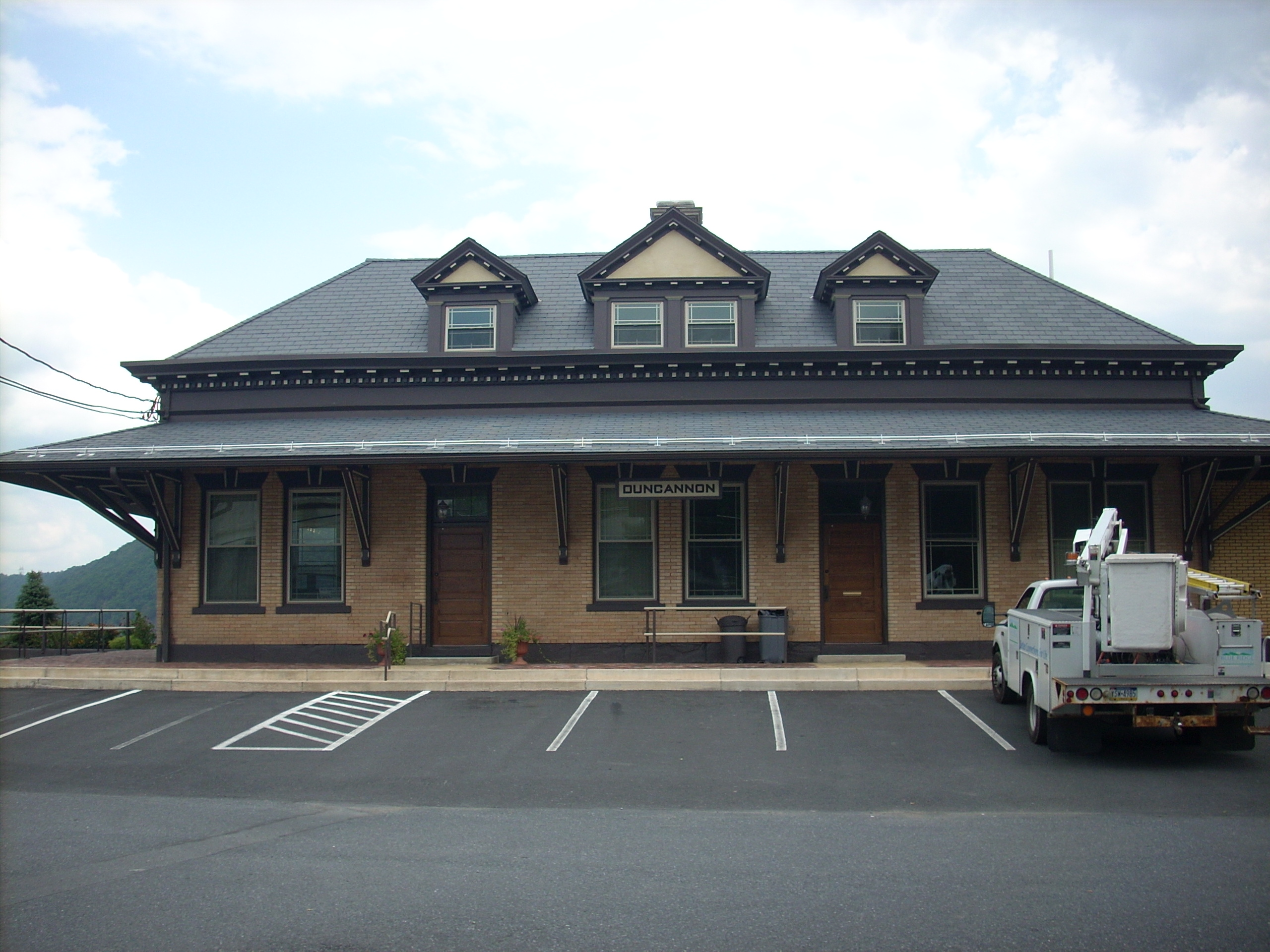
Former Duncannon train depot

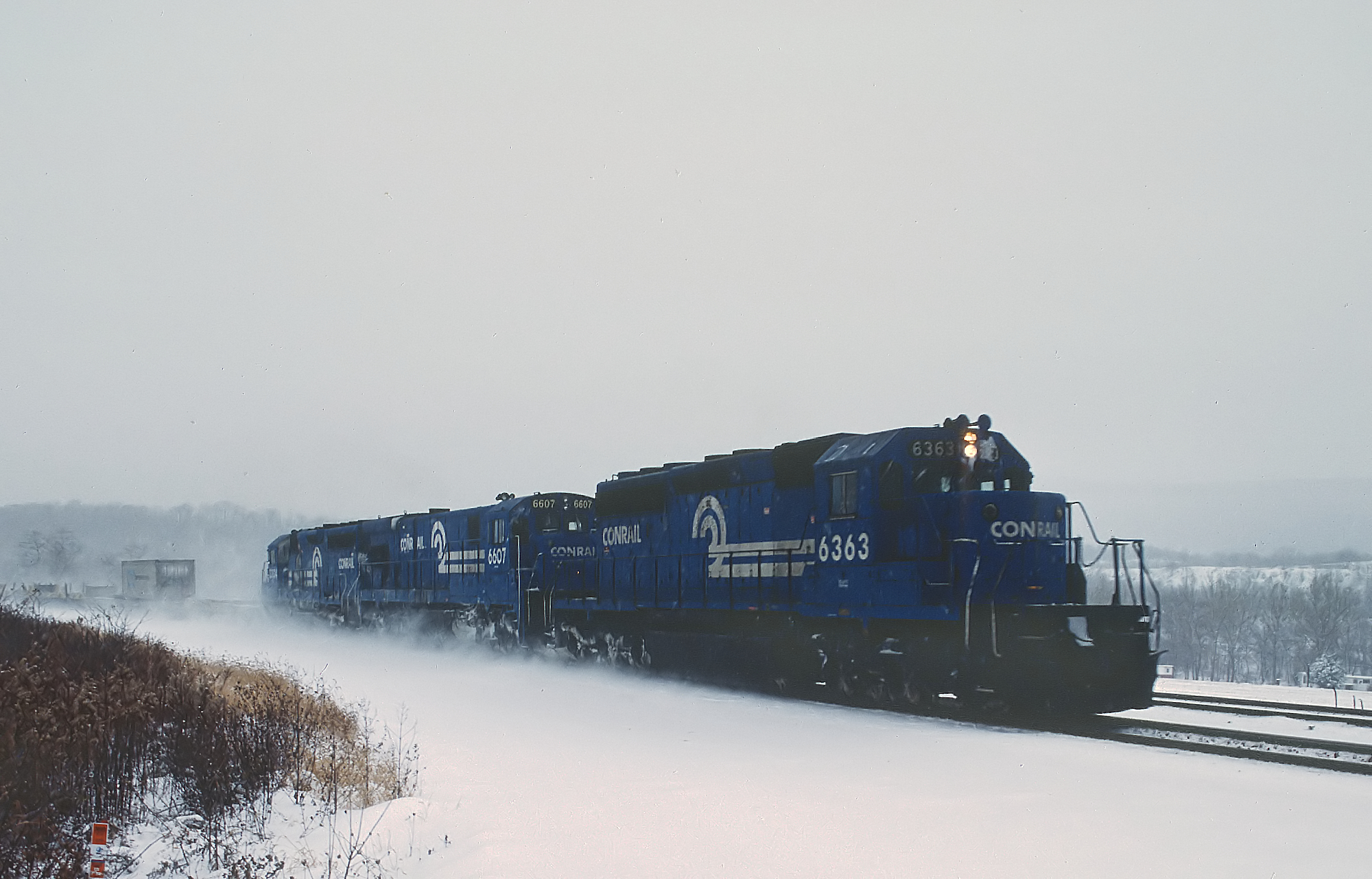
A train passing through Duncannon

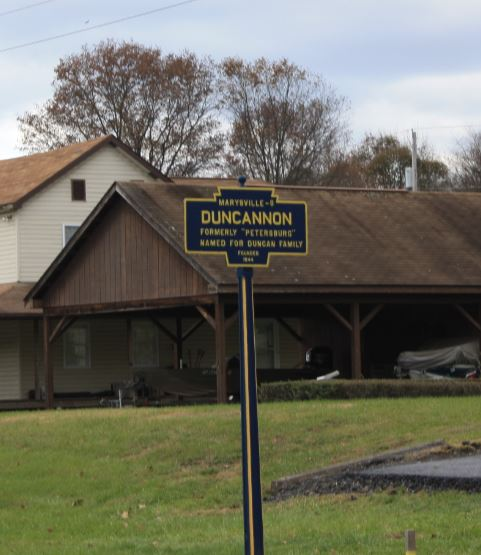
A historical name marker

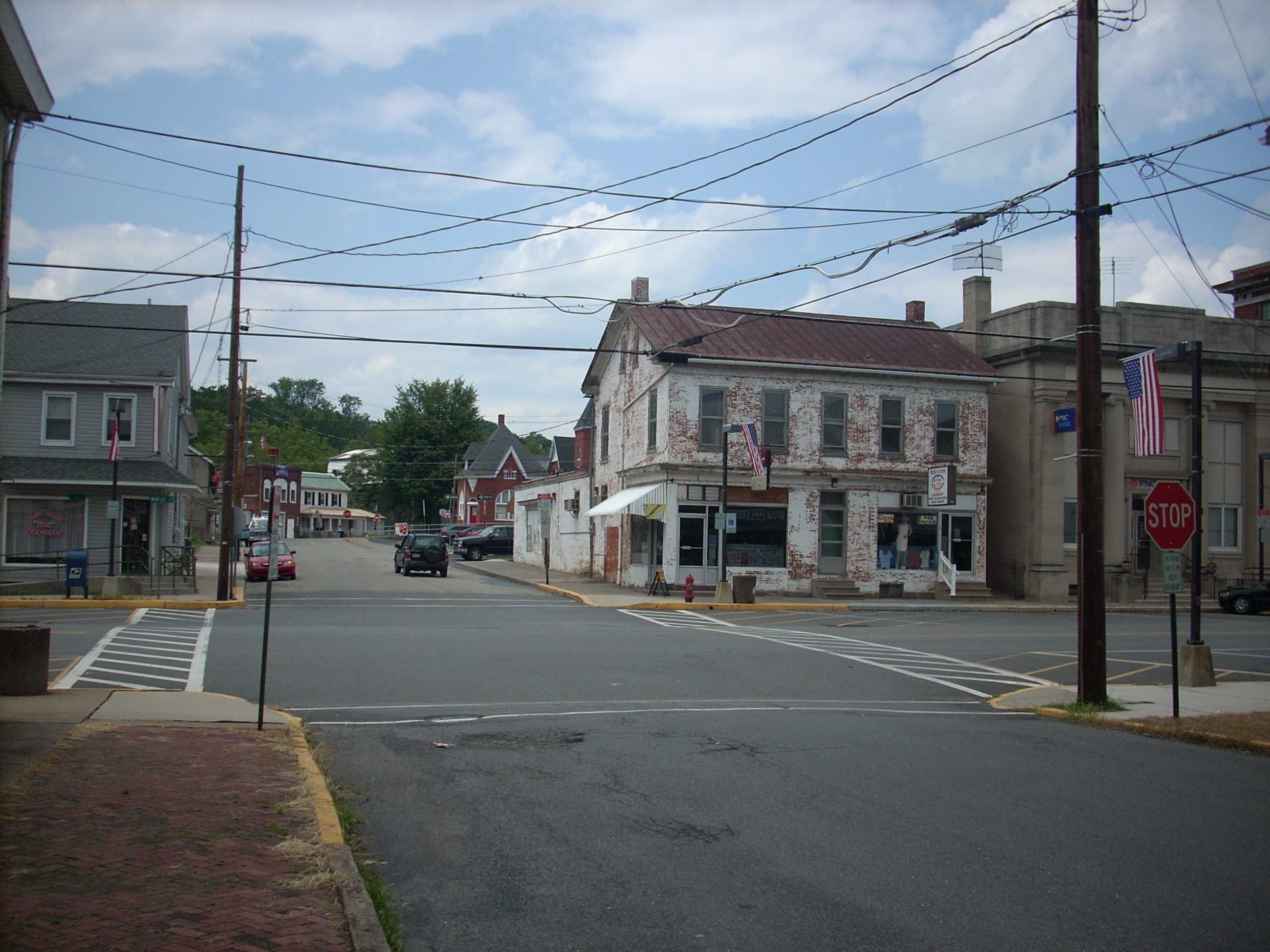
A view of a crossroads
