= Boile Run =

Boile Run Boyle Run
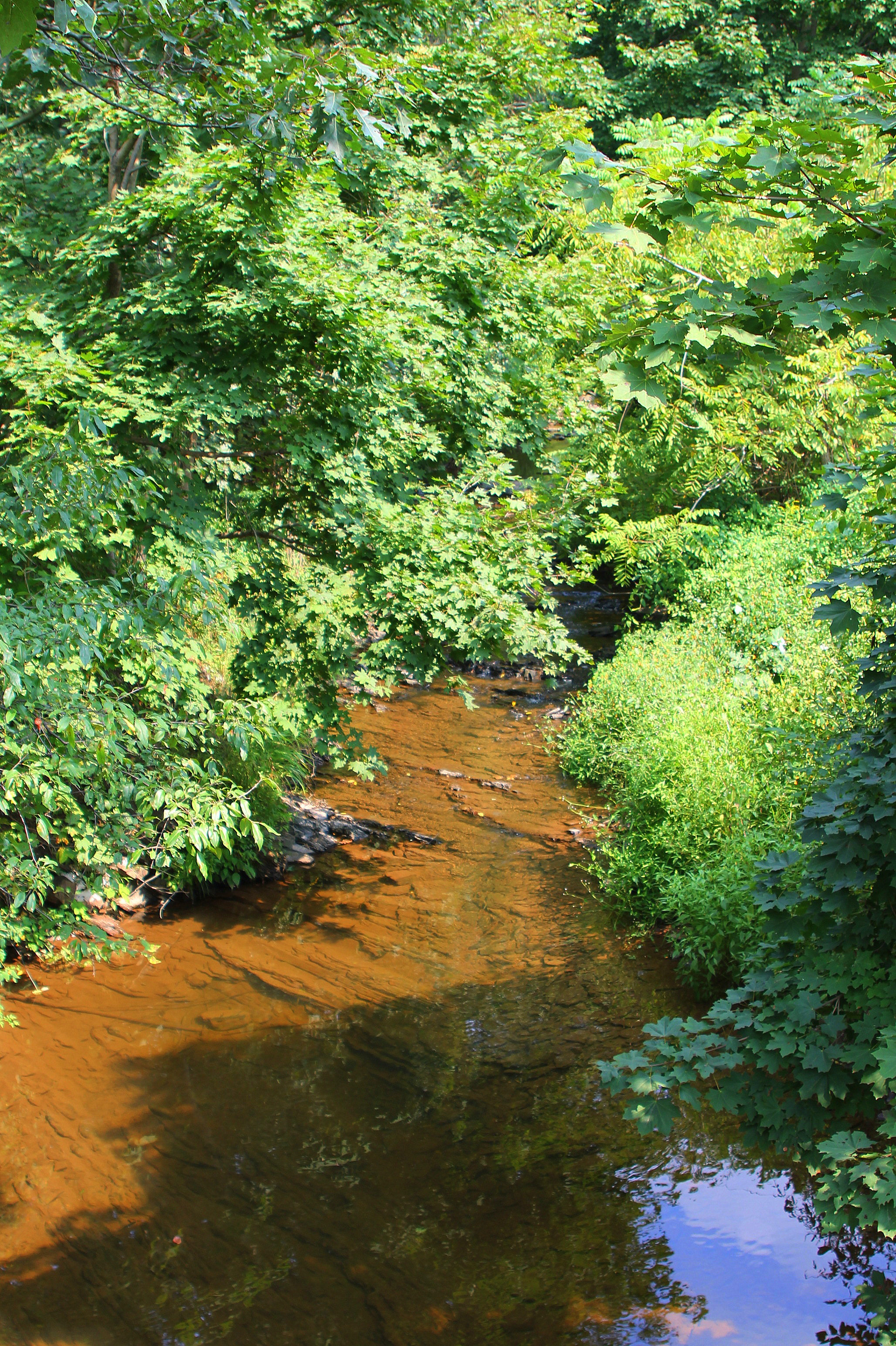
- Boile Run in its lower reaches

Physical characteristics
- Source
  - location: pond or small lake at the base of Little Mountain in Lower Augusta Township, Northumberland County, Pennsylvania
  - elevation: between 760 and 780 feet (232 and 238 m)
- Mouth
  - location: Susquehanna River in Lower Augusta Township, Northumberland County, Pennsylvania
  - coordinates: 40°45′31″N 76°50′30″W
  - elevation: 413 ft (126 m)
- Length: 4.7 mi (7.6 km)
- Basin size: 5.97 mi^{2} (15.5 km^{2})

Basin features
- Progression: Susquehanna River → Chesapeake Bay
- Tributaries
  - left: two unnamed tributaries
  - right: three unnamed tributaries

Boile Run (also known as Boyle Run) is a tributary of the Susquehanna River in Northumberland County, Pennsylvania, in the United States. It is approximately 4.7 miles (7.6 km) long and flows through Lower Augusta Township. The watershed of the stream has an area of 5.97 square miles (15.5 km^{2}). The stream is not designated as an impaired waterbody and is a relatively small stream. There was a mill on Boile Run in the second half of the 1800s and several bridges have been built over the stream. Its watershed is designated as a Warmwater Fishery and a Migratory Fishery.

== Course ==
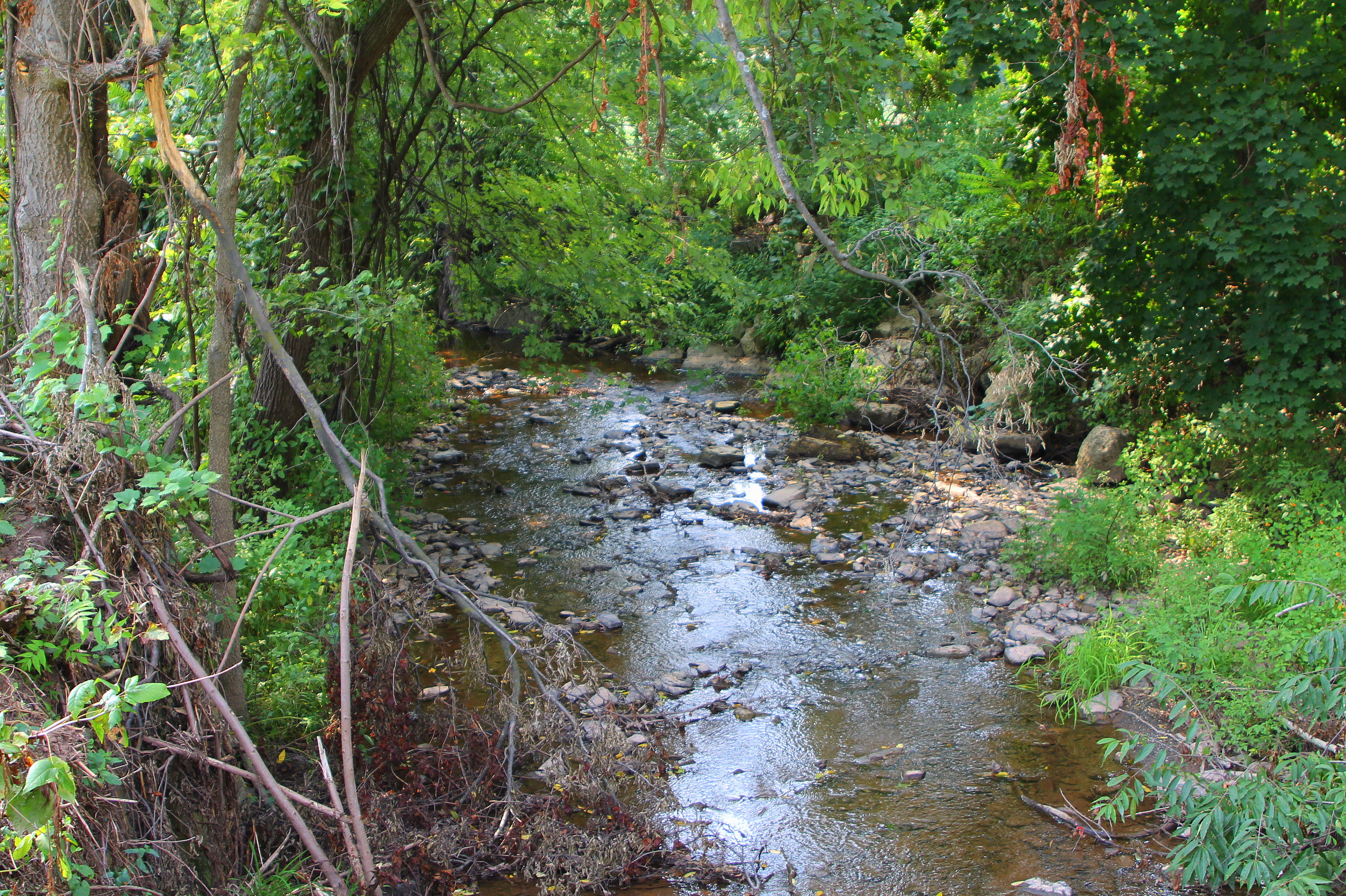
Boile Run as seen from Pennsylvania Route 147

Boile Run begins in a pond or small lake at the base of Little Mountain in Lower Augusta Township. It flows west-northwest into a valley for several tenths of a mile and passes through another pond or small lake before turning west-southwest for more than a mile, receiving two unnamed tributaries from the right. The stream then turns west for a short distance before receiving an unnamed tributary from the left and turning southwest. It flows in this direction for more than a mile, receiving another unnamed tributary from the right along the way, before meandering west, receiving another unnamed tributary from the left, and then turning south. It then leaves its valley, crosses Pennsylvania Route 147 and a railroad, and reaches its confluence with the Susquehanna River.

Boile Run joins the Susquehanna River 116.32 miles (187.20 km) upriver of its mouth.

== Hydrology ==
Boile Run is not designated as an impaired waterbody. At least one person has a National Pollutant Discharge Elimination System to discharge sewage into an unnamed tributary of the stream from a single residence.

The peak annual discharge of Boile Run at its mouth has a 10 percent chance of reaching 1,000 cubic feet per second (28 m^{3}/s). It has a 2 percent chance of reaching 2,200 cubic feet per second (62 m^{3}/s) and a 1 percent chance of reaching 3,000 cubic feet per second (85 m^{3}/s).

== Geography and geology ==
The elevation near the mouth of Boile Run is 413 feet (126 m) above sea level. The elevation of the stream's source is between 760 and 780 feet (232 and 238 m) above sea level.

Boile Run is a small stream. Its headwaters are 0.25 miles (0.40 km) west of Resler and its mouth is 0.5 miles (0.80 km) south of Fishers Ferry.

== Watershed ==
The watershed of Boile Run has an area of 5.97 square miles (15.5 km^{2}). The stream is entirely within the United States Geological Survey quadrangle of Sunbury. Its designated use is for aquatic life.

Boile Run is one of two major creeks in Lower Augusta Township, the other being Hallowing Run.

Flooding occurred on Boile Run in June 1972.

== History ==
Boile Run was entered into the Geographic Names Information System on August 2, 1979. Its identifier in the Geographic Names Information System is 1169949. The stream is also known as Boyle Run, a name which appears on a 1953 United States Geological Survey map.

The original spelling of the stream's name was "Boile Run"; this was corrupted to "Boyle Run" on some maps, though the earlier name had appeared on maps as far back as 1874. In 1965, the USGS recommended that the name "Boile Run" be formally adopted. Many of the early settlers in the valley of Boile Run were of Scotch-Irish descent. John Snyder built a mill on the stream in 1858 and operated it until it burned down in 1880.

A concrete tee beam bridge carrying State Route 4022 over Boile Run was built in 1922 and is 23.0 feet (7.0 m) long. A steel stringer/multi-beam or girder bridge carrying the same road over the stream was built in 1934 and is 24.0 feet (7.3 m) long. Another bridge of that type and carrying State Route 4022 was built over the stream in 1934 and is 37.9 feet (11.6 m) long. A concrete slab bridge carrying that road over Boile Run was built in 1961 and is 30.8 feet (9.4 m) long. A concrete tee beam bridge carrying T-394 over the stream is 27.9 feet (8.5 m) long and was built in 1989. In 1991, a prestressed slab bridge carrying Pennsylvania Route 147 was built over the stream and is 28.9 feet (8.8 m) long.

A bridge carrying State Route 4022 over Boile Run was slated for replacement in 2015.

== Biology ==
The drainage basin of Boile Run is designated as a Warmwater Fishery and a Migratory Fishery.

== See also ==
- Penns Creek, next tributary of the Susquehanna River going downriver
- Hallowing Run, next tributary of the Susquehanna River going upriver
- List of rivers of Pennsylvania
