= Sealholtz Run =

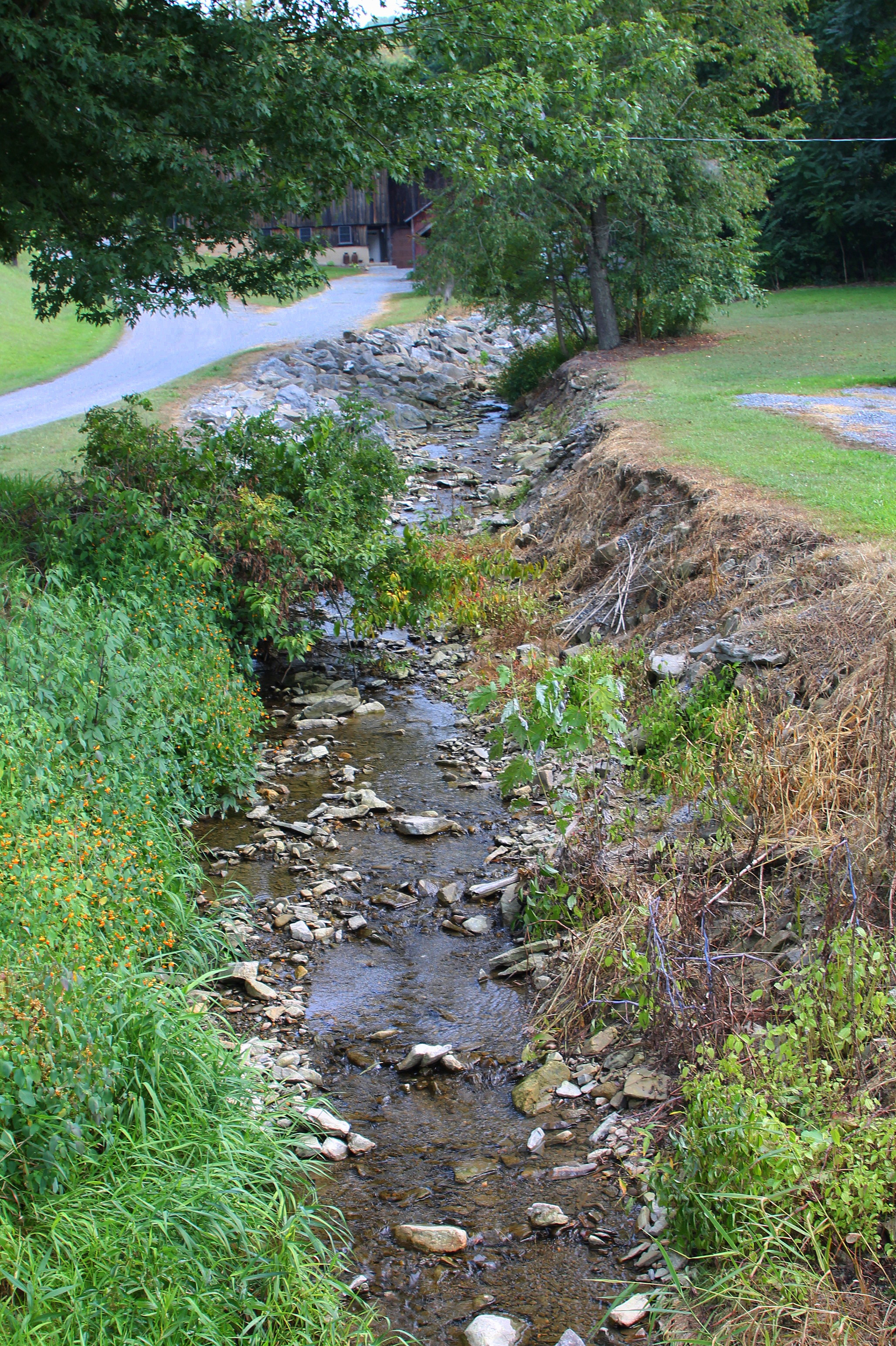
- Sealholtz Run looking upstream

Physical characteristics
- Source
  - location: Valley in Lower Augusta Township, Pennsylvania
  - elevation: between 820 and 840 feet (250 and 260 m)
- Mouth
  - location: Susquehanna River in Upper Augusta Township, Pennsylvania
  - coordinates: 40°48′44″N 76°50′11″W
  - elevation: 427 ft (130 m)
- Length: 2.0 mi (3.2 km)
- Basin size: 0.77 sq mi (2.0 km^{2})

Basin features
- Progression: Susquehanna River → Chesapeake Bay

Sealholtz Run is a tributary of the Susquehanna River in Northumberland County, Pennsylvania. It is approximately 2.0 miles (3.2 km) long and flows through Lower Augusta Township and Upper Augusta Township. The watershed of the stream has an area of 0.77 square miles (2.0 km^{2}). The stream is not designated as an impaired waterbody. Its drainage basin is designated as a Warmwater Fishery and a Migratory Fishery.

== Course ==
Sealholtz Run begins in a valley in Lower Augusta Township. It flows west-southwest for several tenths of a mile before turning west-northwest, while the sides of its valley become steeper. After a few tenths of a mile, the stream turns south and then west before turning northwest. A short distance further downstream, it turns west-northwest, and leaves its valley. After a short distance, it crosses Pennsylvania Route 147 and a railroad, and reaches its confluence with the Susquehanna River.

Sealholtz Run joins the Susquehanna River 120.24 miles (193.51 km) upriver of its mouth.

== Hydrology ==
Sealholtz Run is not designated as an impaired waterbody. PPL Corporation was once given a National Pollutant Discharge Elimination System permit to discharge stormwater into the stream for construction purposes.

== Geography and geology ==
The elevation near the mouth of Sealholtz Run is 427 feet (130 m) above sea level. The elevation of the stream's source is between 820 and 840 feet (250 and 260 m) above sea level.

Sealholtz Run joins the Susquehanna River on the river's left bank.

== Watershed ==
The watershed of Sealholtz Run has an area of 0.77 square miles (2.0 km^{2}). The stream is entirely within the United States Geological Survey quadrangle of Sunbury. Its designated use is for aquatic life.

== History ==
Sealholtz Run was entered into the Geographic Names Information System on August 2, 1979. Its identifier in the Geographic Names Information System is 1187195.

== Biology ==
The drainage basin of Sealholtz Run is designated as a Warmwater Fishery and a Migratory Fishery. The stream is affected by catch and release regulations for bass.

== See also ==
- Hallowing Run, next tributary of the Susquehanna River going upriver
- Rolling Green Run, next tributary of the Susquehanna River going upriver
- List of rivers of Pennsylvania
