= Egg Hill =

Coordinates: 40°49′54″N 77°36′07″W

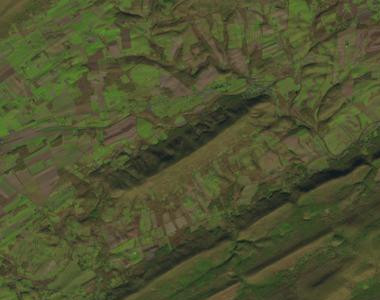
2016 Landsat image of Egg Hill

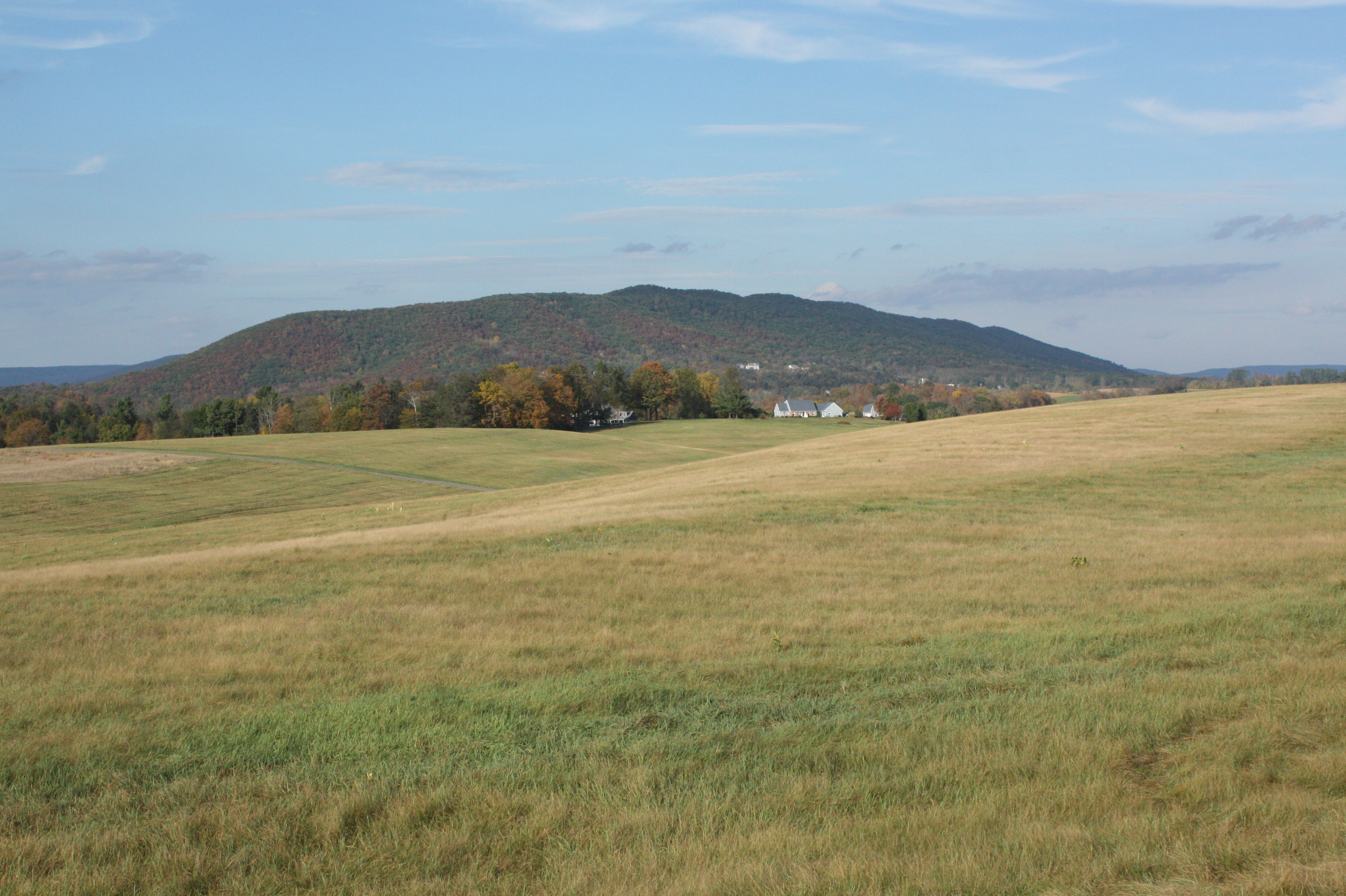
Egg Hill, viewed facing north from Route 322

Egg Hill is an elongate hill trending northeast–southwest in southern Centre County, Pennsylvania. It is mostly forested and uninhabited. Sinking Creek flows northeastward along the northern foot of Egg Hill. The town of Spring Mills is located at the northeastern end.

The historic Egg Hill Church is located at the southwestern end of the hill.

== Geology ==
The crest of Egg Hill is along the axis of a minor syncline, within the larger Nittany Anticlinorium. The bedrock along the axis is the Ordovician Bald Eagle Formation, which is mostly sandstone. The crest of the hill is over 1,900 feet (580 m) elevation.
