= Elk Creek (Pine Creek tributary) =

Tributary of Pine Creek in Pennsylvania

Coordinates: 40°52′05″N 77°27′20″W

Elk Creek is a 19.2-mile-long (30.9 km) tributary of Pine Creek in Centre County, Pennsylvania in the United States. Via Penns Creek, it is part of the Susquehanna River watershed.

Elk Creek flows through Centre County, rising in a valley between Hough Mountain and Brush Mountain, east of Livonia, and flowing west-southwest through Brush Valley, passing the villages of Smullton and Rebersburg, before turning south at Spring Bang to cut through Brush Mountain and Shriner Mountain. Entering Penns Valley, Elk Creek passes through the borough of Millheim and continues south-southeast to its mouth at Pine Creek, just upstream from that creek's end at Penns Creek in Coburn.

== See also ==
- List of rivers of Pennsylvania
