= Hallowing Run =

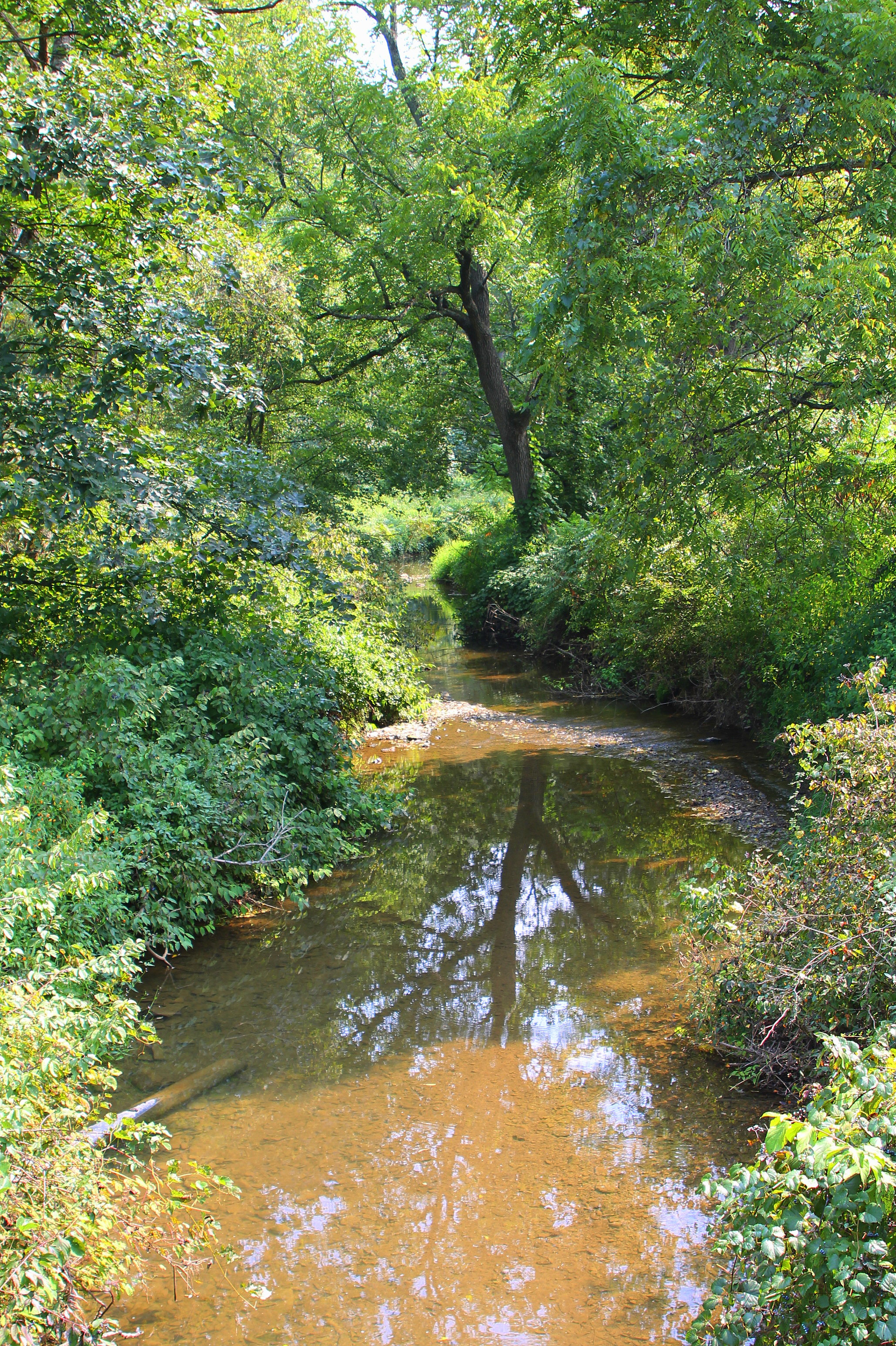
- Hallowing Run looking downstream in its lower reaches

Physical characteristics
- Source
  - location: small valley in Lower Augusta Township, Northumberland County, Pennsylvania
  - elevation: between 760 and 780 feet (232 and 238 m)
- Mouth
  - location: Susquehanna River in Lower Augusta Township, Northumberland County, Pennsylvania
  - coordinates: 40°46′19″N 76°50′46″W
  - elevation: 413 ft (126 m)
- Length: 6.1 mi (9.8 km)
- Basin size: 7.71 mi^{2} (20.0 km^{2})

Basin features
- Progression: Susquehanna River → Chesapeake Bay
- Tributaries
  - left: seven unnamed tributaries
  - right: three unnamed tributaries

Hallowing Run (also known as Hollowing Run) is a tributary of the Susquehanna River in Northumberland County, Pennsylvania, in the United States. It is approximately 6.1 miles (9.8 km) long and flows through Lower Augusta Township. The watershed of the stream has an area of 7.71 square miles (20.0 km^{2}). The stream is not designated as an impaired waterbody. It is a stream of "local importance" according to History of Northumberland County, Pennsylvania, and is located between Little Mountain and the Shamokin Hills. The area in its vicinity was settled by the first half of the 1800s and several bridges have been constructed over the stream. Its watershed is designated as a Warmwater Fishery and a Migratory Fishery.

== Course ==
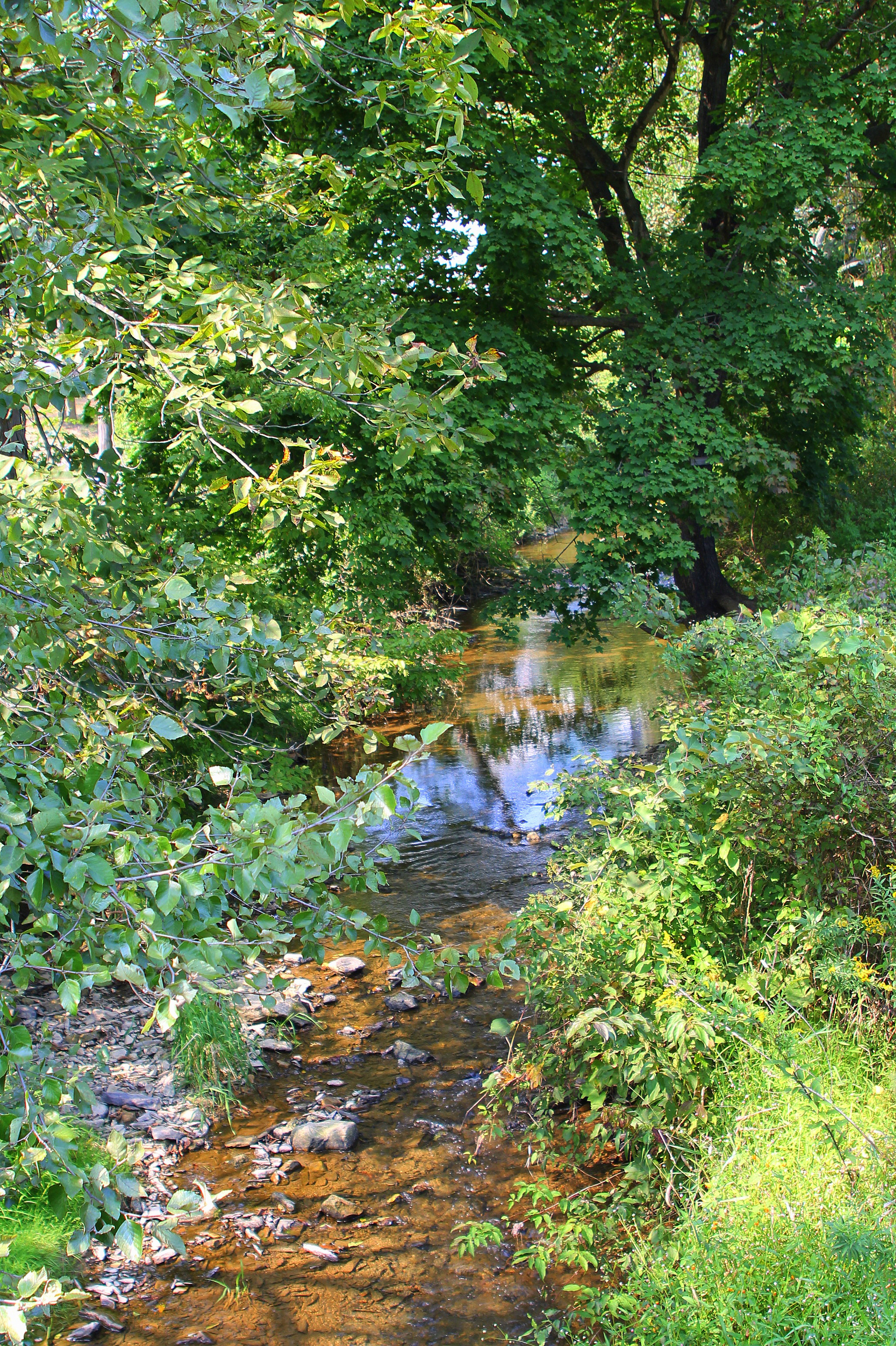
Hallowing Run looking upstream in its lower reaches

Hallowing Run begins in a small valley in Lower Augusta Township. It flows north for a few tenths of a mile and enters a much larger and deeper valley. Here, the stream flows north-northwest for a short distance before turning west-southwest for a few miles. In this reach, it flows through the valley alongside Hallowing Run Road and receives several unnamed tributaries: seven from the left and three from the right. The stream then turns south-southwest and its valley narrows. It begins flowing alongside Pennsylvania Route 147. Several tenths of a mile further downstream, it leaves its valley and turns west. The stream then crosses Pennsylvania Route 147 and a railroad and reaches its confluence with the Susquehanna River.

Hallowing Run joins the Susquehanna River 117.22 miles (188.65 km) upriver of its mouth.

== Hydrology ==
Hallowing Run is not designated as an impaired waterbody.

== Geography and geology ==
The elevation near the mouth of Hallowing Run is 413 feet (126 m) above sea level. The elevation of the stream's source is between 760 and 780 feet (232 and 238 m) above sea level.

A total of 125 tons of riprap were once placed along 120 feet (37 m) of Hallowing Run. Dark olive rocks of the Chemung Formation occur in the vicinity of the stream's mouth.

Hallowing Run was described as a stream of "local importance" in J.J. John's 1891 book History of Northumberland County, Pennsylvania. It is situated between the Shamokin Hills and Little Mountain.

== Watershed ==
The watershed of Hallowing Run has an area of 7.71 square miles (20.0 km^{2}). The stream is entirely within the United States Geological Survey quadrangle of Sunbury. The stream's designated use is for aquatic life.

Flash flooding impacts some reaches of Hallowing Run. Such flooding damages agricultural land in the area and causes streambank erosion. However, stormwater drainage and moderate flooding does not typically cause problems on the stream. Hallowing Run and some other streams in its vicinity experienced bank flooding in January 1996. However, recovery and damage repair were underway later that year. In 2013, the Northumberland County Conservation District was awarded a $356,000 Growing Greener grant from the Pennsylvania Department of Environmental Protection for Hallowing Run and Schwaben Creek.

== History ==
Hallowing Run was entered into the Geographic Names Information System on August 2, 1979. Its identifier in the Geographic Names Information System is 1176401. The stream is also known as Hollowing Run. This name appears in Israel C. White's 1883 book The geology of the North Branch Susquehanna River Region in the six counties of Wyoming, Lackawanna, Luzerne, Columbia, Montour and Northumberland.

By the early to mid 1800s, the area in the vicinity of Hallowing Run was somewhat settled, with farms, mills, and a small number of schoolhouses. A roadway known as Hallowing Run Road also passed through the area, connecting with Harrisburg Road and Tulpehocken Road. Many of the early settlers in the area were Scotch-Irish. A Mr. DeWitt constructed a mill 6 miles (9.7 km) from Sunbury in 1840 and used Hallowing Run as a power source.

A steel stringer/multi-beam or girder bridge carrying Township Road T-394 over Hallowing Run in 1904. It is located south of Sunbury and is 26.9 feet (8.2 m) long. A concrete tee beam bridge carrying State Route 4020 over the stream was built in the village of Asherton in 1921. This bridge is 30.8 feet (9.4 m) long. A steel stringer/multi-beam or girder bridge carrying the same road over Hallowing Run was built in 1973. It is 24.9 feet (7.6 m) long and is located 1.5 miles (2.4 km) west of Augustaville. At least one wooden covered bridge historically crossed Hallowing Run.

== Biology ==
The drainage basin of Hallowing Run is designated as a Warmwater Fishery and a Migratory Fishery. The lower 0.5 miles (0.80 km) stream is affected by catch and release regulations by the Pennsylvania Fish and Boat Commission for bass.

== See also ==
- Boile Run, next tributary of the Susquehanna River going downriver
- Sealholtz Run, next tributary of the Susquehanna River going upriver
