= Egg Hill Church =

Historic church in Pennsylvania, United States

- U.S. National Register of Historic Places
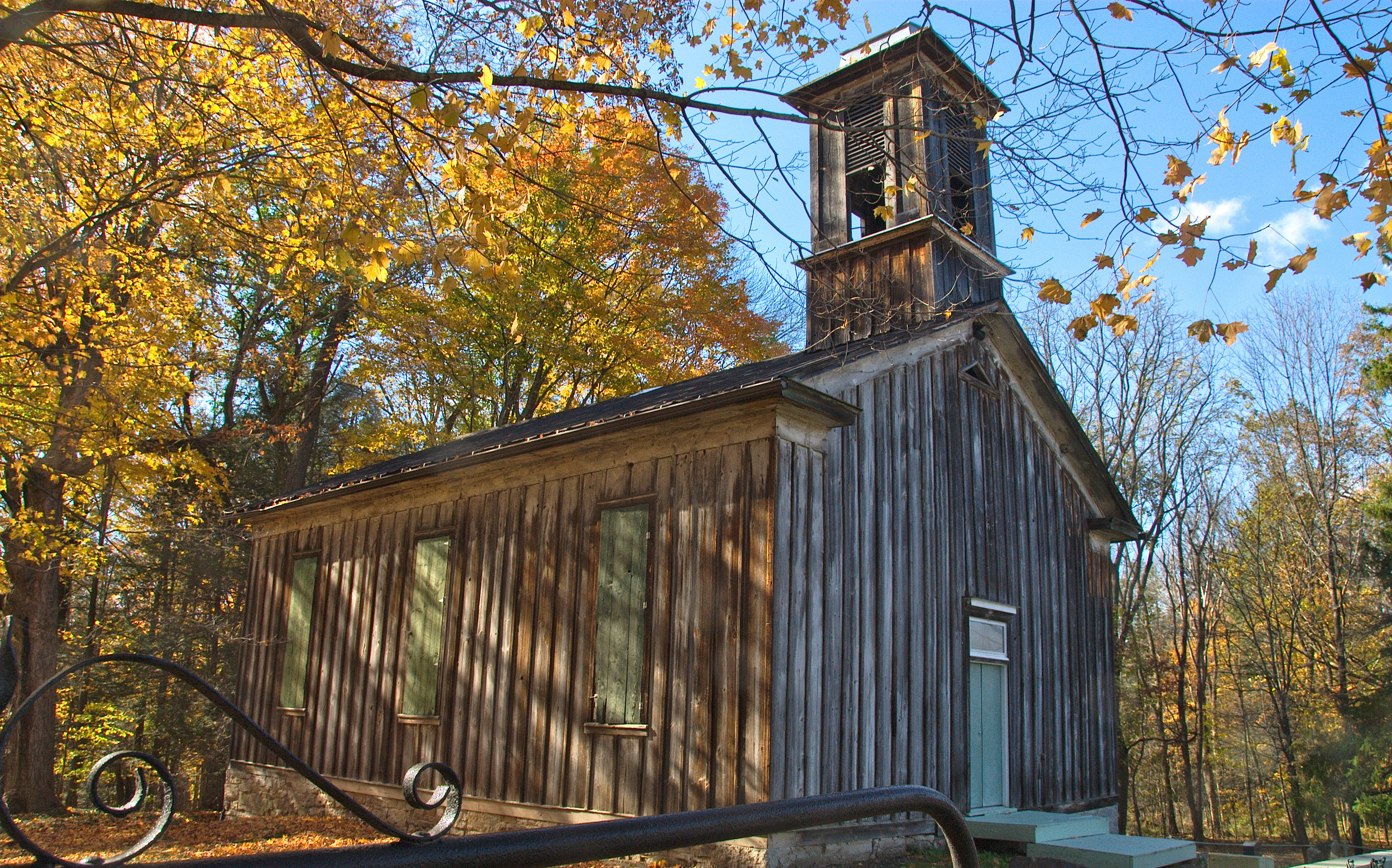

- Location within Pennsylvania Location within the United States
- Location: Southwest of Spring Mills on Egg Hill Road, Potter Township, Pennsylvania
- Coordinates: 40°49′42″N 77°37′32″W
- Area: 2.3 acres (0.93 ha)
- Built: 1860
- NRHP reference No.: 79002189
- Added to NRHP: June 04, 1979

Egg Hill Church is a historic church located in Potter Township, Centre County, Pennsylvania, United States. It was built in 1860, and is a one-story, banked building built of pine on a stone foundation. It measures 35 feet (11 m) wide and 42 feet (13 m) long. Regular services at the church were suspended in 1927. The church is located at the southwest end of Egg Hill.

It was added to the National Register of Historic Places in 1979.

== History ==
Before the 1800s, German immigrants were settling this area. Most of the immigrants were farmers. They had a circuit-riding minister who traveled on horseback to the area. During his six-week trip, he would travel in a circle and visit as many homes as possible and conduct church services. People would have church in their homes. Reverend Philip Fithian was one of these ministers. He traveled Penns Valley as early as 1775.

Jacob Albright started the Evangelical movement. He started to preach in 1796 and had many followers. In 1806, there was a major revival movement and Jacob Albright was elected Bishop. During this time he came to Centre County to preach in pioneer homes, including John Dauberman’s home on Egg Hill.

By the 1830s, there were enough followers and it was realistic to build a church. Circuit-riding ministers would have as many as four to six homes where they held services.

By 1838, the first Evangelical log church was built on Egg Hill, on land owned by the Dauberman family. Dauberman family members have been buried on this property since their relocation from Union County to the western end of Egg Hill in Penns Valley, Centre County, about 1799.

In 1860, the old log church was replaced with the current building. The simple wooden structure was built entirely of pine, reflecting the simplicity and humility of its evangelical founders.

Regular weekly services were held at Egg Hill until 1927 when the church closed due to diminishing attendance. They would continue to have an annual Homecoming Service, usually held the last Sunday in September.

This section is attributed to Centre County historian, Vonnie Henninger, and Jennifer Weaver Tate, descendant of the Dauberman family.

Chronological order of events:

- 1800 – Evangelical Association was founded by Jacob Albright. These associations were popular in the predominately German communities of central Pennsylvania.
- 1838 – John and Mary Dauberman donated land on what the locals called Egg Hill. The property on which the original log church was built contained the original Dauberman Lutheran Cemetery where family members are buried since relocating to the western end of Egg Hill in Penns Valley, Centre County, about 1799.
- 1838 – The cemetery became known as Egg Hill Cemetery and saw its first recorded burial of Daniel Waggoner, a Revolutionary War veteran who lived near the church. The last burial allowed in the Cemetery occurred in 2016. See the link below for a list of those buried here.
- 1860 – The original log church was replaced by the current building. Congregation members built the simple wooden structure using pine wood which reflected the simplicity and humility of its founders.
- 1927 – For many years, the Daubermans, Daubs, Daups, Fraziers, Groves, Hennig(h)s, Leisters, Millers, Tresslers and other local families supported the Egg Hill Church until it suspended regular services in 1927. The only time the church was used after 1927 was for an annual Homecoming Service, along with sporadic weddings and other special events.
- 1970 – The church steeple was removed after it was determined to be beyond repair.
- 1978 – Paperwork nominating the Egg Hill Church to the National Register of Historic Places was completed by William Burke, Centre County Historic Registration Project, and certified by Ed Weintraub, State Historic Preservation Officer for the National Historic Preservation Act of 1966 and Director of the Office of Historic Preservation, on October 16, 1978.
- 1979 – With the church in need of many repairs, a group of church trustees, family descendants and other interested parties reached out to the Centre County Historical Society and the Methodist District Conference to save the church from demolition. The church is now on the National Register of Historic Places (#79002189) as of June 4, 1979.
- 1979 – Egg Hill Church's local trustees, with E. Lynn Miller serving as the lead, submitted an application to become incorporated as a non-profit corporation in the Commonwealth of Pennsylvania and was named Egg Hill Conservancy, Inc. on November 28, 1979. The application was approved by the Acting Secretary of the Commonwealth on December 11, 1979.
- 1980 – Harrisburg attorney Robert Knupp, who represented the Methodist Conference of Pennsylvania, said the conference approved an offer made by the local trustees, through Attorney Amos Goodall, to form a cemetery association which would then lease the church to the Egg Hill Conservancy formed in 1979 for $100 a year. In addition to the $100 yearly lease, the cemetery association would receive proceeds from a free-will offering at the church's yearly Homecoming Service in September, and would assure perpetual care for the cemetery as well as saving the church.
- 1980 – The Egg Hill Cemetery Association was formed. Trustees of the congregation of United Evangelical Church of Egg Hill, Potter Township, Centre County, and the Board of Trustees of the Central Pennsylvania Conference of the United Methodist Church signed a deed granting the property to the Egg Hill Cemetery Association for One Dollar ($1.00) on November 14, 1980.
- 1980 – Had the actions of the church's trustees, the Egg Hill Conservancy, Inc. and the Egg Hill Cemetery Association not occurred, Egg Hill Church would have been sold and the building razed.
- 1988 – The church was used in a film documentary on William Penn’s vision of creating a utopian community where religious freedom and toleration would be observed.
- 2019 – After inspections were completed on the church, the building itself was deemed safe, however, the foundation was found to be in poor condition and needed replaced. A "GoFundMe" account was established by Centre County Historian, Vonnie Esterline Henninger, to raise funds so this work could be done.
- 2020 – Foundation work and other associated repairs on the Egg Hill Church were completed.
- 2024 – Several repairs are needed to the building, including replacing some exterior wood siding on the rear of the building, wood shutters and windows; eaves and soffit need immediate attention; and it is not known how soon the roof will need to be replaced. After many years supervising repairs and managing donated funds for such repairs, Vonnie Esterline Henninger, asked Beth Kennedy to take her place. A new group was formed on 2025 with the intention of raising funds to cover these repairs. A Facebook page (Friends of Egg Hill Church) was created to highlight activity at the church.
- 2026 - A grant from the William G. Pomeroy Foundation was approved for a roadside historic marker and the sign was installed in April 2026. Three events have been scheduled for the year, a spring service on April 26th, the Fall Homecoming service on September 27th, and the second annual Christmas Concert on December 6th. Repairs have begun with money raised from several sources.
