= Rolling Green Run =

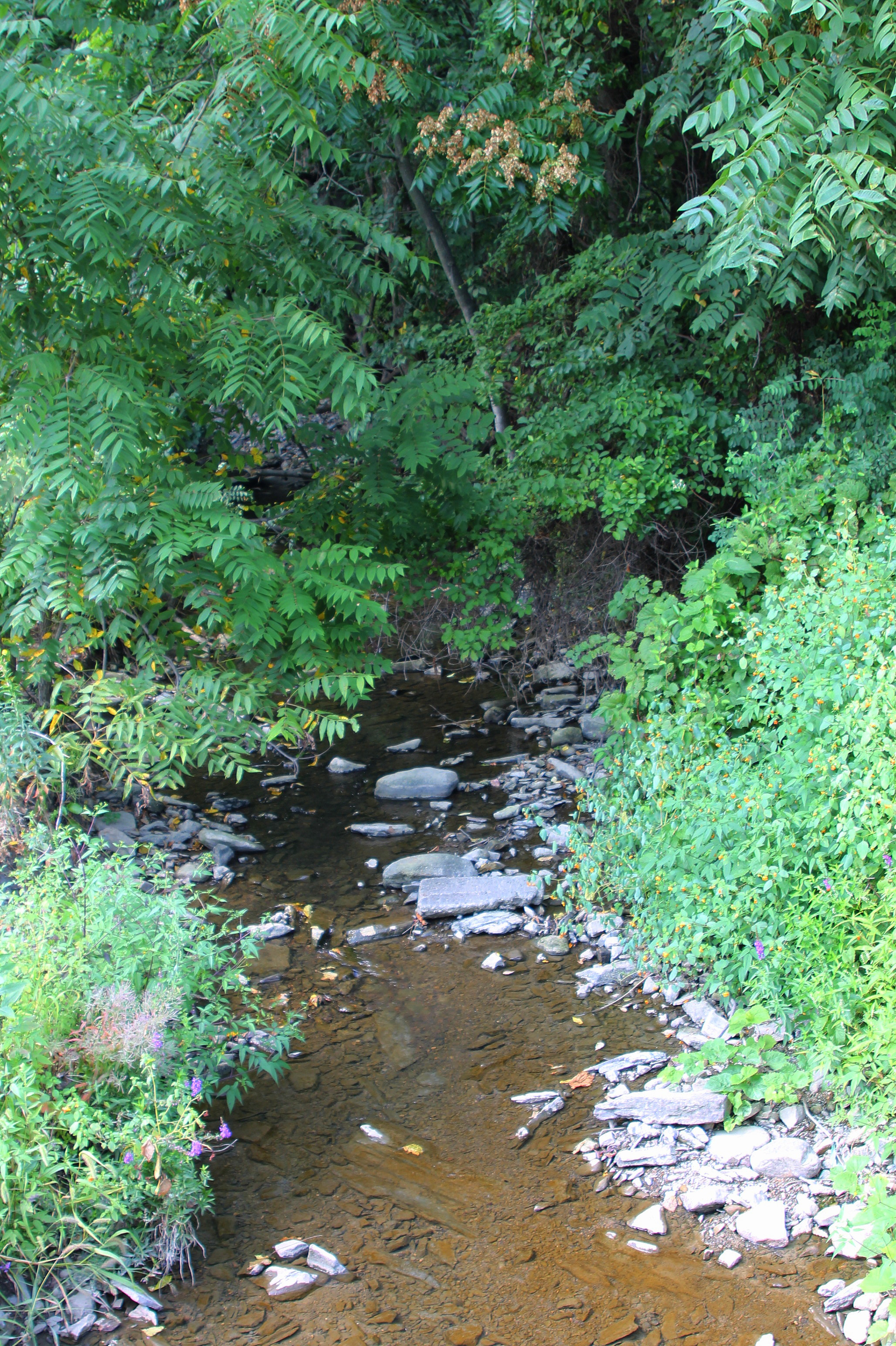
- Rolling Green Run looking downstream in its lower reaches

Physical characteristics
- Source
  - location: small valley in Monroe Township, Snyder County, Pennsylvania
  - elevation: between 780 and 800 feet (240 and 240 m)
- Mouth
  - location: Susquehanna River in Hummels Wharf in Monroe Township, Snyder County, Pennsylvania
  - coordinates: 40°49′58″N 76°49′41″W
  - elevation: 410 ft (120 m)
- Length: 3.3 mi (5.3 km)
- Basin size: 2.04 sq mi (5.3 km^{2})

Basin features
- Progression: Susquehanna River → Chesapeake Bay
- Tributaries
  - left: one unnamed tributary
  - right: one unnamed tributary

Rolling Green Run is a tributary of the Susquehanna River in Snyder County, Pennsylvania, in the United States. It is approximately 3.3 miles (5.3 km) long and flows through Monroe Township. The watershed of the stream has an area of 2.04 square miles (5.3 km^{2}). The stream is designated as an impaired waterbody due to habitat alteration from golf courses. Its drainage basin is designated as a Warmwater Fishery and a Migratory Fishery.

== Course ==
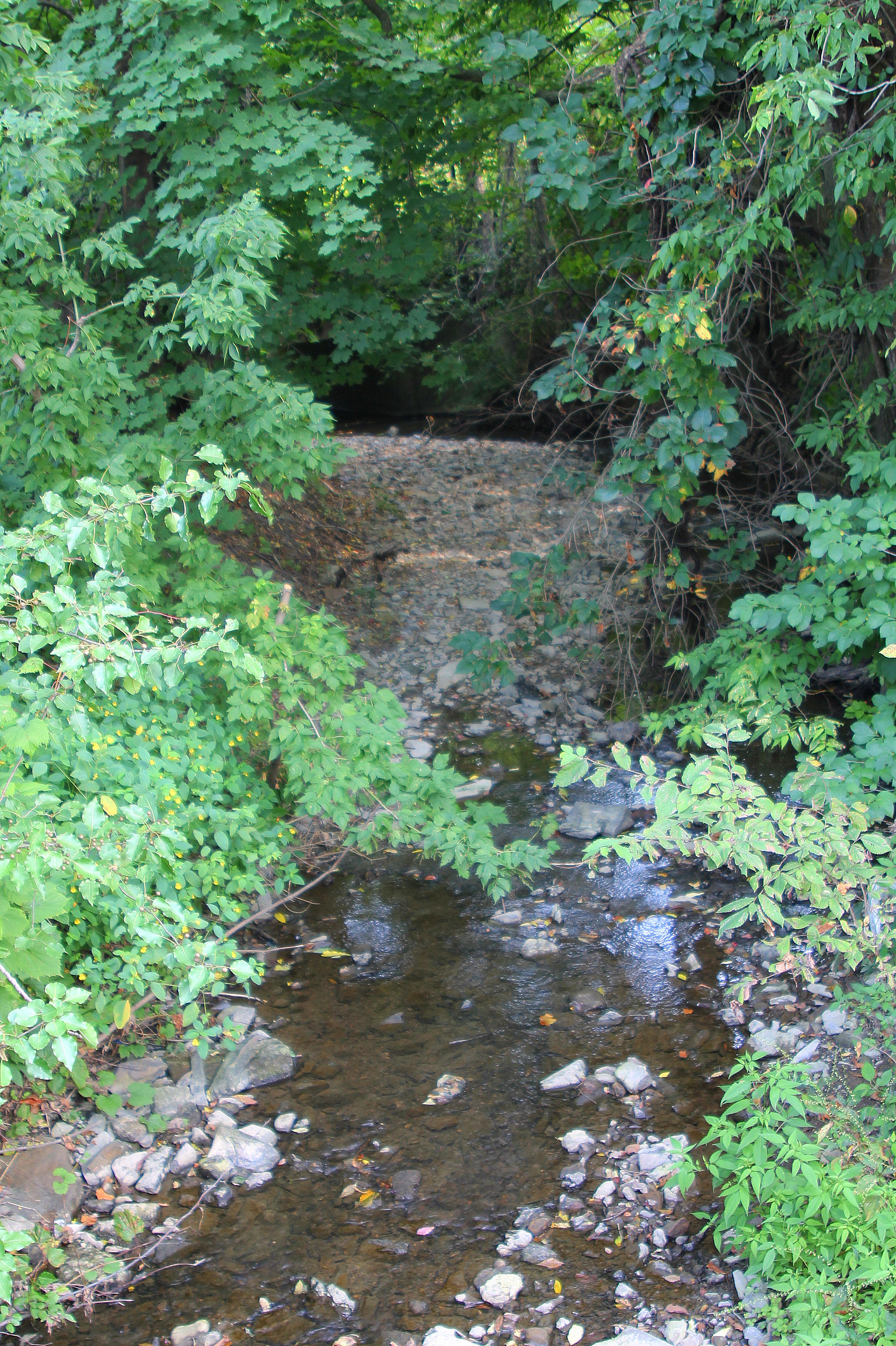
Rolling Green Run looking upstream in its lower reaches

Rolling Green Run begins in a small valley in Monroe Township. It flows west for a few tenths of a mile and enters a larger valley. Here, the stream turns south-southeast for several tenths of a mile before turning southeast. Several tenths of a mile further downstream, it leaves the valley, receives two unnamed tributaries (one from the left and one from the right), and enters the census-designated place of Hummels Wharf. In Hummels Wharf, the stream turns south-southeast for more than a mile before crossing US Route 11/US Route 15 and turning northeast. It flows parallel to the Susquehanna River for several tenths of a mile before reaching its confluence with the Susquehanna River.

Rolling Green Run joins the Susquehanna River 121.78 miles (195.99 km).

== Hydrology ==
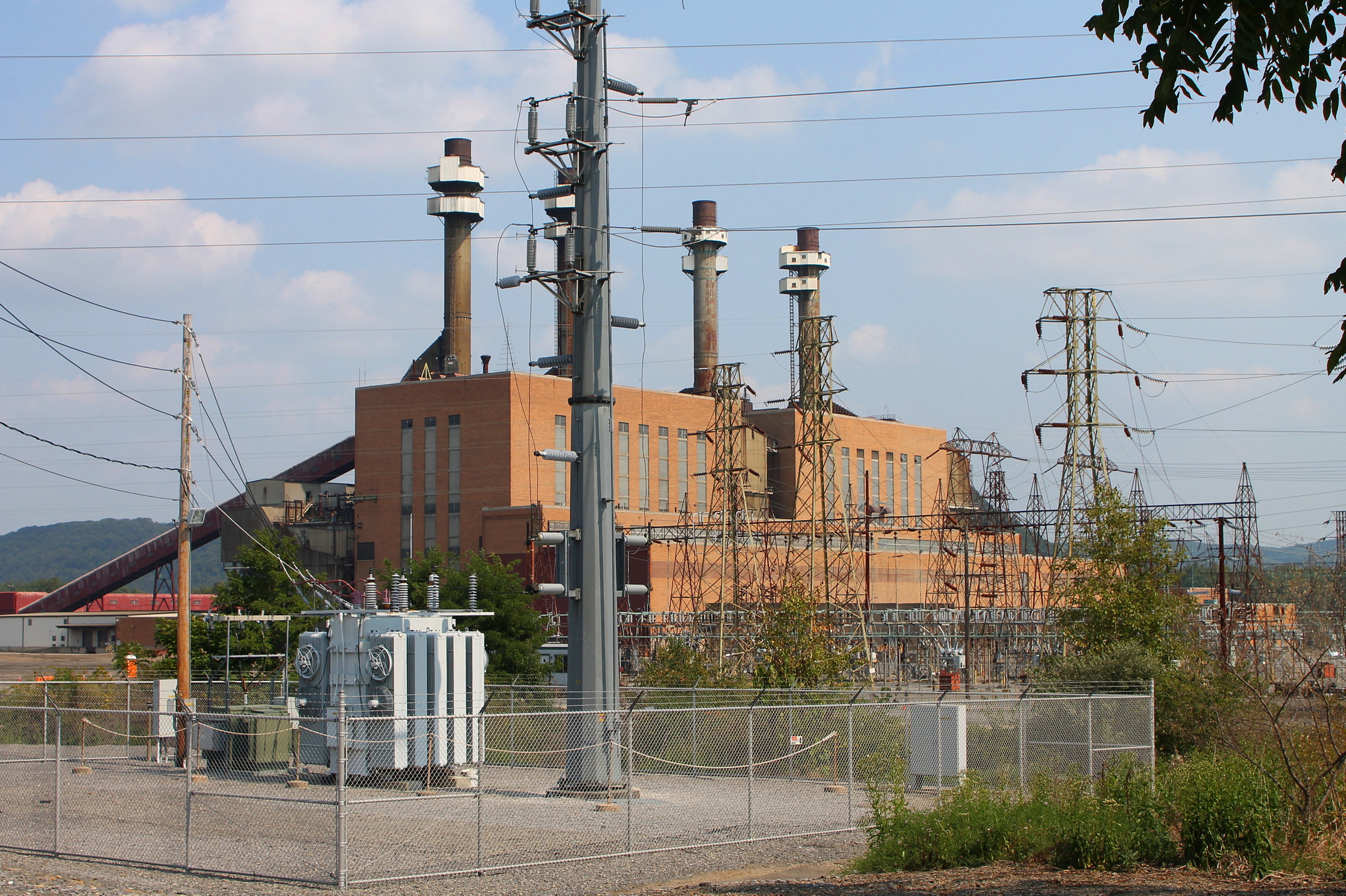
Sunbury Generation LP building

A total of 2.5 miles (4.0 km) of streams in the watershed of Rolling Green Run are designated as impaired. The cause of the impairment is miscellaneous habitat alteration and the probable source is golf courses. Sunbury Generation LP is authorized to discharge bottom ash sluice water and stormwater into the stream until June 30, 2019.

== Geography and geology ==
The elevation near the mouth of Rolling Green Run is 410 feet (120 m) above sea level. The elevation of the stream's source is between 780 and 800 feet (240 and 240 m) above sea level.

Rolling Green Run was historically a tributary of Penns Creek. In the 1970s, two 15-inch (38-centimeter) lines emptied into Rolling Green Run.

== Watershed ==
The watershed of 2.04 square miles (5.3 km^{2}). The stream is entirely within the United States Geological Survey quadrangle of Sunbury. The designated use of the stream is aquatic life.

There are relative acute threats of localized flooding on Rolling Green Run.

== History ==
Rolling Green Run was entered into the Geographic Names Information System on August 2, 1979. Its identifier in the Geographic Names Information System is 1185407.

A steel stringer/multi-beam or girder bridge carrying State Route 1017 over Rolling Green Run was constructed in 1954. It is located 1.5 miles (2.4 km) southwest of Shamokin Dam and is 22.0 feet (6.7 m) long. In 2003, a project to add 12 to 13 miles (19 to 21 km) of new four-lane, limited-access highway to US Route 15 was described as impacting the stream.

== Biology ==
The drainage basin of Rolling Green Run is designated as a Warmwater Fishery and a Migratory Fishery. The stream is affected by catch and release regulations for bass.

== See also ==
- Sealholtz Run, next tributary of the Susquehanna River going downriver
- Shamokin Creek, next tributary of the Susquehanna River going upriver
- List of rivers of Pennsylvania
