= Caspar Snyder House =

- U.S. National Register of Historic Places
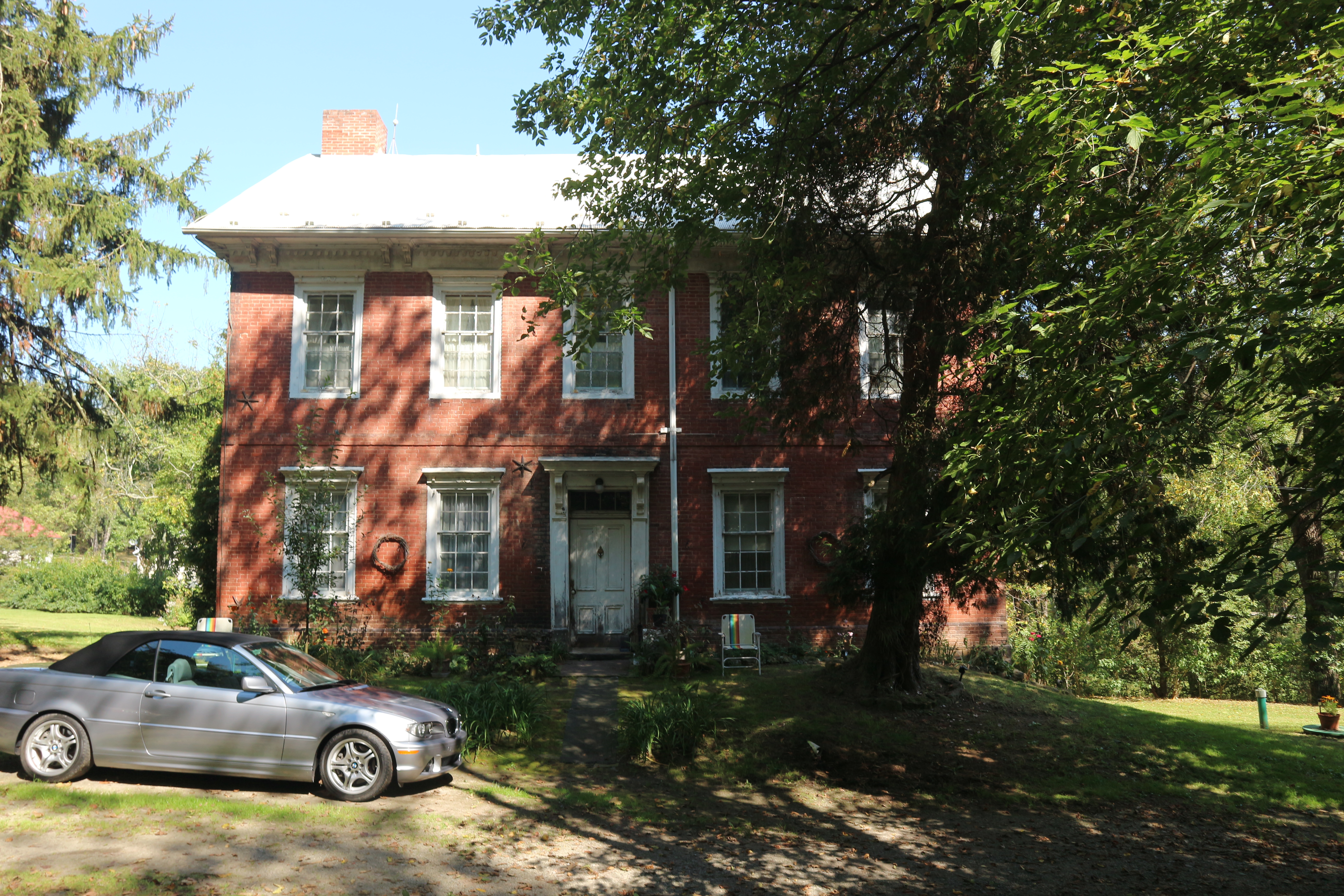

- Location within Pennsylvania Location within the United States
- Coordinates: 40°46′53″N 76°50′31″W
- Built: 1798
- Built by: Caspar Snyder
- Architectural style: Colonial
- NRHP reference No.: 09000101
- Added to NRHP: Nov, 24 1978

The Caspar Snyder House (aka the Blue Ball Tavern), is a historic home in Lower Augusta Township, Northumberland County, Pennsylvania. It was added to the National Register of Historic Places in 1978.

== History ==
The Caspar Snyder House was built by Caspar (aka Casper) Snyder, a Revolutionary War veteran who had emigrated from Germany prior to the war. Snyder built the home in 1798 in Augusta Township in Northumberland County. (The land on which it was constructed subsequently became part of Lower Augusta Township when the township was divided into Upper August and Lower Augusta townships in 1846.)

The building functioned as a local tavern for at least three generations.

== Gallery ==
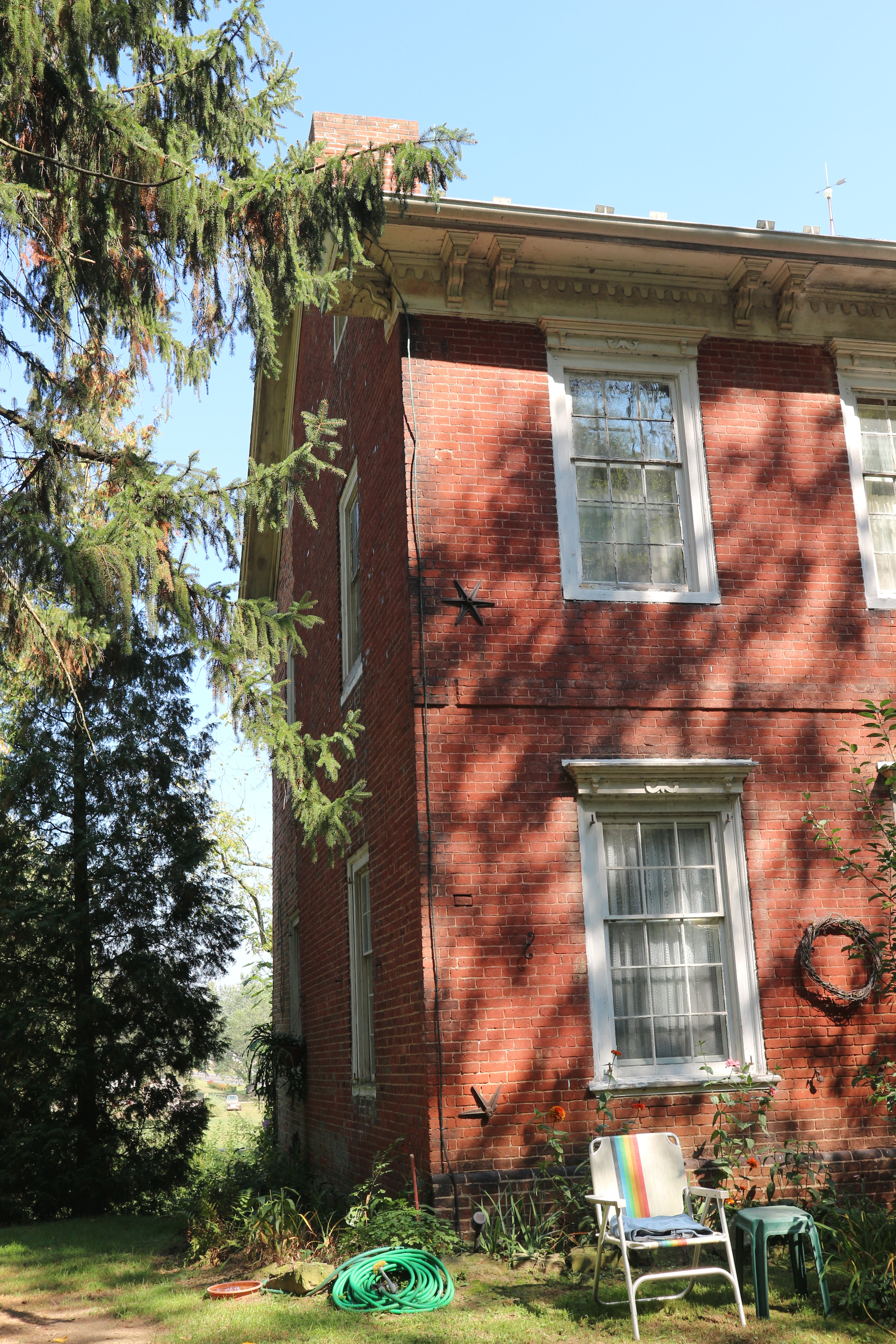
