= Coburn, Pennsylvania =

Unincorporated community in Pennsylvania, US

- Census-designated place
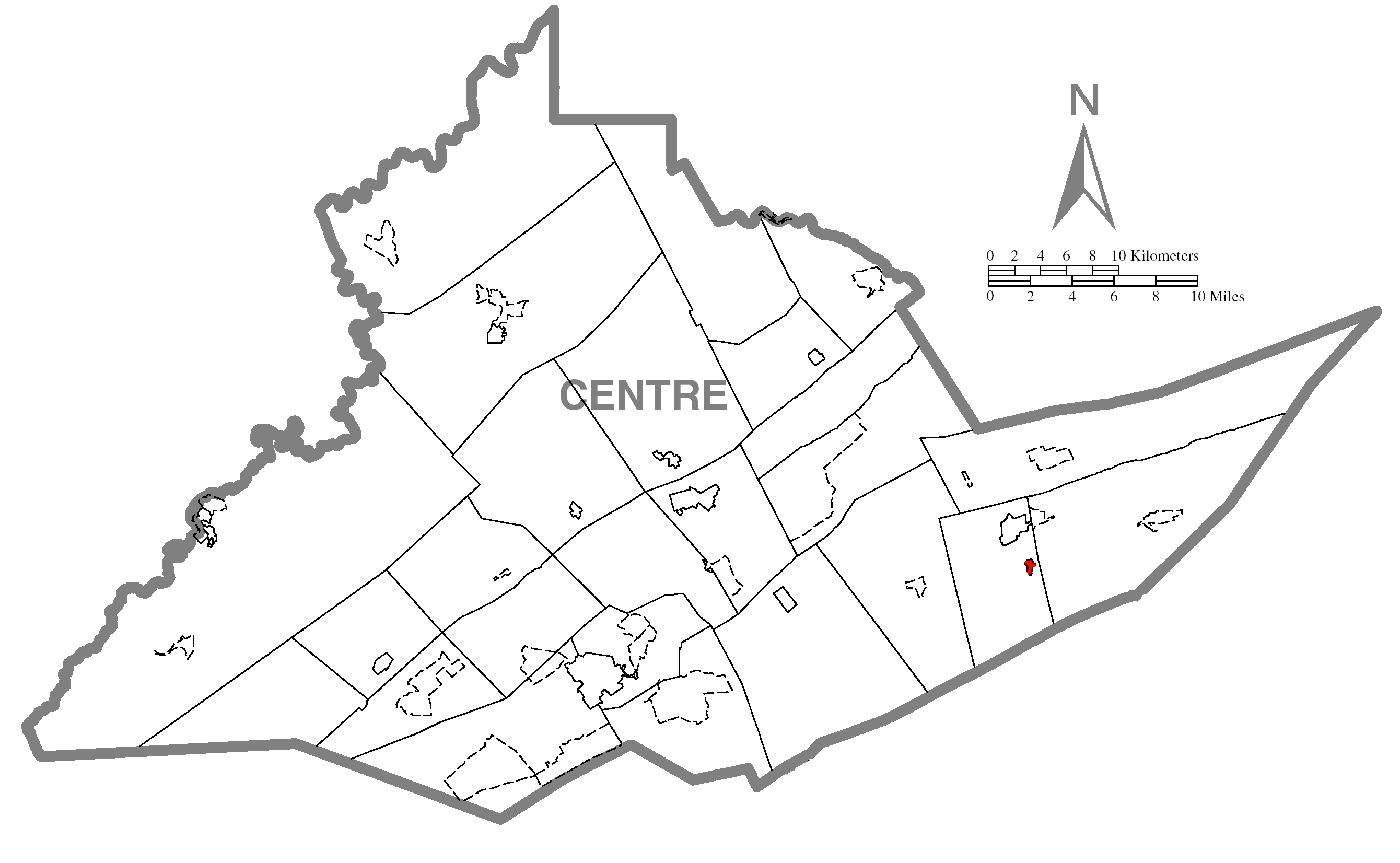
- Location of Coburn in Centre County

- Location of Centre County in Pennsylvania
- Coordinates: 40°51′46″N 77°27′44″W
- Country: United States
- State: Pennsylvania
- County: Centre
- Township: Penn

Area
  - Total: 0.35 sq mi (0.90 km^{2})
  - Land: 0.35 sq mi (0.90 km^{2})
  - Water: 0 sq mi (0.00 km^{2})
- Elevation: 1,030 ft (310 m)

Population (2020)
  - Total: 210
  - Density: 602.6/sq mi (232.65/km^{2})
- Time zone: UTC-5 (Eastern (EST))
  - Summer (DST): UTC-4 (EDT)
- ZIP code: 16832
- FIPS code: 42-14760
- GNIS feature ID: 1172103

Coburn is a census-designated place (CDP) in Centre County, Pennsylvania, United States. It is part of the State College, Pennsylvania Metropolitan Statistical Area. The population was 236 at the 2010 census.

== Geography ==
Coburn is located in eastern Centre County, in the eastern part of Penn Township. The town is sited at the junction of Pine Creek and Penns Creek, where Penns Creek turns south, leaving the Penns Valley, and begins slicing through a series of Appalachian Mountain ridges, starting with First Mountain at the southern edge of Coburn. The borough of Millheim is 2.5 miles (4.0 km) north of Coburn.

According to the United States Census Bureau, the CDP has a total area of 0.4 square miles (1.0 km^{2}), all land.

== History ==
Growth of the town was aided by the Lewisburg and Tyrone Railroad, which built through town in 1884. The section of track east of Coburn was abandoned on July 14, 1970. Rail service ended due to damage from Hurricane Agnes in June 1972, and the line west of Coburn was formally abandoned by the Penn Central in May 1973.

== Demographics ==
Historical population
Census	Pop.	Note	%±
2020	210		—
U.S. Decennial Census

As of the census of 2000, there were 145 people, 57 households, and 40 families living in the CDP. The population density was 665.8 inhabitants per square mile (257.1/km^{2}). There were 62 housing units at an average density of 284.7 per square mile (109.9/km^{2}). The racial makeup of the CDP was 97.93% White, 0.69% Asian, and 1.38% from two or more races. Hispanic or Latino of any race were 0.69% of the population.

There were 57 households, out of which 28.1% had children under the age of 18 living with them, 57.9% were married couples living together, 8.8% had a female householder with no husband present, and 28.1% were non-families. 19.3% of all households were made up of individuals, and 8.8% had someone living alone who was 65 years of age or older. The average household size was 2.54 and the average family size was 2.90.

In the CDP, the population was spread out, with 22.1% under the age of 18, 7.6% from 18 to 24, 24.1% from 25 to 44, 31.7% from 45 to 64, and 14.5% who were 65 years of age or older. The median age was 42 years. For every 100 females, there were 110.1 males. For every 100 females age 18 and over, there were 101.8 males.

The median income for a household in the CDP was $47,083, and the median income for a family was $37,500. Males had a median income of $29,167 versus $33,125 for females. The per capita income for the CDP was $16,510. There were 7.9% of families and 13.6% of the population living below the poverty line, including 30.6% of under eighteens and none of those over 64.
