= Selinsgrove Bridge =

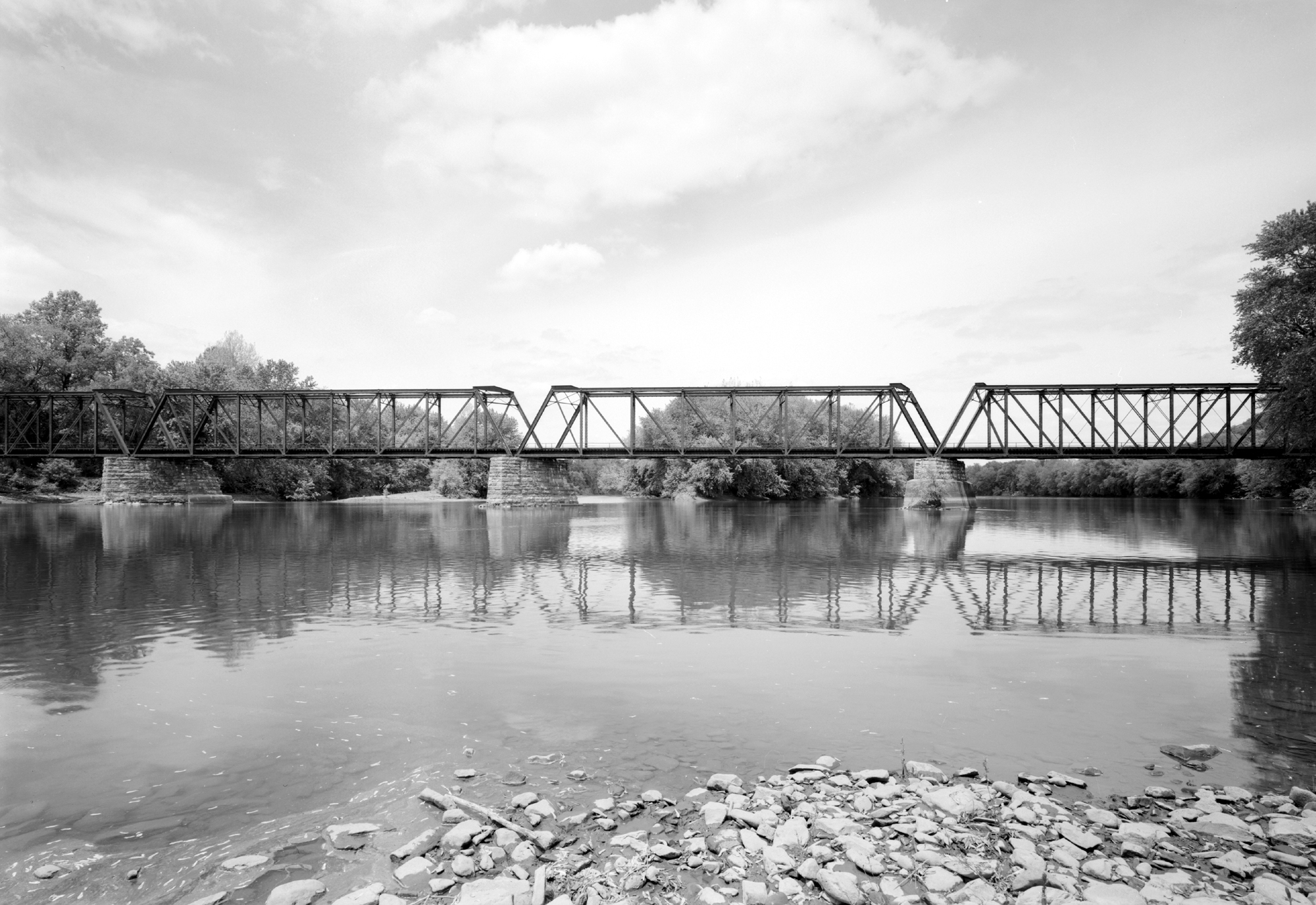
- East channel spans of Selinsgrove Bridge, looking north.
- Coordinates: 40°48′05″N 76°50′44″W
- Carries: Railroad
- Crosses: Susquehanna River
- Locale: Selinsgrove Junction and Selinsgrove
- Official name: Selinsgrove Bridge
- Other name(s): Selinsgrove Railroad Bridge
- Maintained by: North Shore Railroad (Pennsylvania)

Characteristics
- Design: Pratt truss
- Material: Wrought iron
- No. of spans: 16

History
- Designer: William H. Brown
- Constructed by: Pencoyd Bridge & Construction; Cofrode & Saylor
- Opened: 1888

The Selinsgrove Bridge is a railroad bridge that carries the North Shore Railroad (Pennsylvania) Selinsgrove Branch across the Susquehanna River between Lower Augusta Township, Pennsylvania and Selinsgrove, Pennsylvania. The bridge once carried Pennsylvania Railroad, Penn Central Railroad, and later Norfolk Southern lines across the river. The bridge crosses over Cherry and Fishers Islands. Many of its wrought iron Pratt through truss spans date to 1888, with significant alterations in 1901, 1925 and 1930.

== See also ==
- List of bridges documented by the Historic American Engineering Record in Pennsylvania
- List of crossings of the Susquehanna River
- Selinsgrove, Pennsylvania
