= Fishers Ferry, Pennsylvania =

Unincorporated community in Pennsylvania, US

- Unincorporated community
- Location within Pennsylvania
- Coordinates: 40°46′09″N 76°50′41″W
- Country: United States
- State: Pennsylvania
- County: Northumberland
- Township: Lower Augusta
- Elevation: 420 ft (130 m)
- Time zone: UTC-5 (Eastern (EST))
  - Summer (DST): UTC-4 (EDT)

Fishers Ferry is an unincorporated community in Northumberland County, in the U.S. state of Pennsylvania. The elevation of Fishers Ferry is 420 feet.
