= Pine Creek (Penns Creek tributary) =

Watercourse in Pennsylvania, US

Coordinates: 40°51′39″N 77°27′40″W

Pine Creek is an 18.4-mile-long (29.6 km) tributary of Penns Creek in central Pennsylvania in the United States. Via Penns Creek, it is part of the Susquehanna River watershed.

Pine Creek rises in Bald Eagle State Forest in a high valley between Sharpback Mountain and Buck Ridge. It flows west-southwest into Penns Valley, turning southwest to pass the village of Woodward, then returning to its west-southwest direction along the northern side of Woodward Mountain. It flows to the vicinity of Coburn, where it is joined by Elk Creek and, at Coburn proper, joins Penns Creek.

== See also ==
- List of rivers of Pennsylvania
