= Augusta Township, Pennsylvania =

Former township in Pennsylvania, US

Coordinates: 40.878°N 76.742°W

Augusta Township was one of the seven original townships of Northumberland County, Pennsylvania in the United States. It was formed in 1772 and ceased to exist on April 13, 1846 when it was divided into Upper Augusta and Lower Augusta townships .

== History ==
According to Northumberland County historian Charles Fisher Snyder:

"Among the original townships of Northumberland County, Pennsylvania, one of the first to be named and whose boundaries were defined, was Augusta. As then laid out it embraced all the territory east of the Susquehanna and south of the North Branch eastward to the old Berks-Northampton line, which crossed the North Branch near the present site of Bloomsburg.
Upper Augusta [Township] and Lower Augusta [Township] were formed by the division of Augusta township in 1846...However, at the time of the division the name of "Porter" had been suggested for the southern portion."

According to members of the Lower Augusta Planning Committee who drafted a revised history of their township in 2007, township and county officials involved in the planning and implementation of Augusta Township's division had originally planned to: a.) retain the name of "Augusta Township" for the newly created northern township, and b.) name the newly created southern portion of the township after former Pennsylvania governor David Rittenhouse Porter. It was only "[a]t the last moment, that planners decided that the names should be Upper Augusta Township and Lower Augusta Township. "[Lower Augusta Township's] division was defined as a line crossing Little Shamokin Creek near its junction with Plum Creek."

== Notable buildings ==
Several notable buildings were erected in Augusta Township during its 74-year history:

- Caspar Snyder House: Initially named the Blue Ball Tavern when it was built in 1798 by Revolutionary War veteran Caspar/Casper Snyder, this structure has also been known as the Shissler House. It was added to the National Register of Historic Places in 1978.
- Ferry Service: Sometime during the late 1700s, Adam Fisher launched a ferry service along the Susquehanna River at the mouth of Hallowing Run in Augusta Township. A ferry house and hotel (Penn's Tavern) were also built near the ferry service. After the hotel was abandoned, Jonathan Reitz converted the hotel building into a grocery store. This portion of the township later became known as Fisher's Ferry.
- Mills: Augusta Township's oldest mill was built during the early 1800s "by a Mr. Hilterbeil," according to the 2007 Lower Augusta Planning Committee, and "derived its power from Hallowing Run." It was subsequently purchased in 1856 by William W. DeWitt.
- Penn's Tavern: Built sometime around 1756 by Peter Fisher, a Quaker, according to the 2007 Lower Augusta Planning Committee, or by Colonel Samuel Auchmuty in 1791 "as the eastern terminus for a ferry operated by Adam Fisher, who lived across the river on the Isle of Que," according to Michael McWilliams, second vice president of the Northumberland County Historical Society, this stone tavern is one of the oldest buildings in Northumberland County. Local lore indicates that it may have been associated with Conrad Weiser, or may have been the death location of Marie Cox, the wife of John Penn, a grandson of William Penn.
