= Sinking Creek (Pennsylvania) =

River in Pennsylvania, United States

Coordinates: 40°51′18″N 77°34′20″W

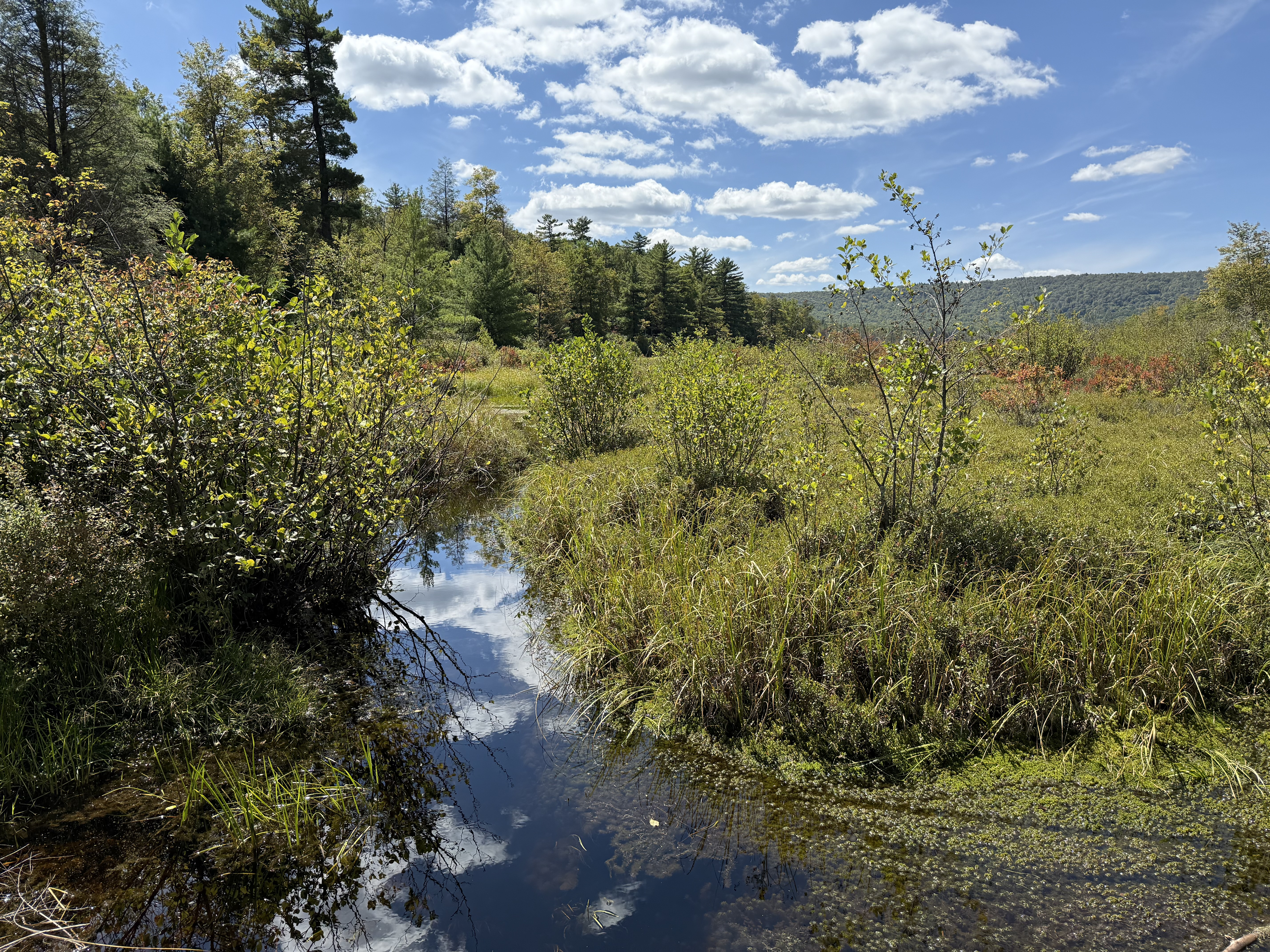
Sinking Creek emerging from Bear Meadows

Sinking Creek is a tributary of Penns Creek in Centre County, Pennsylvania, in the United States. It is approximately 19.8 miles (31.9 km) long and flows through Harris Township, Potter Township, and Gregg Township. The watershed of the creek has an area of 40.70 square miles (105.4 km^{2}).

Sinking Creek carries the variant names of Bear Meadow Run, Potter Stream or Sinking Branch Penns Creek.

The creek is referenced in the historical fiction novel The Bread Sister of Sinking Creek by Robin Moore.

== Course ==
Sinking Creek begins in the Bear Meadows Natural Area in a valley in Harris Township. It flows northeast for a few miles and its valley narrows. The creek eventually enters Potter Township, where it turns northwest before turning northeast again. A short distance later, it passes through Colyer Lake and picks up the tributary Boal Gap Run a short distance afterwards. The creek then begins meandering and crosses U.S. Route 322. Some distance later, it crosses Pennsylvania Route 144 and receives the tributary Potter Run. The course of the creek becomes slightly straighter as it continues northeast on the northern side of a mountain. It eventually enters Gregg Township. A few miles further downstream, it passes north of Egg Hill, and then reaches its confluence with Penns Creek at the community of Spring Mills, 58.82 miles (94.66 km) upstream of the mouth of Penns Creek.

== Geography ==
The elevation near the mouth of Sinking Creek is 1,079 feet (329 m) above sea level. The elevation of the creek's source is approximately 1,720 feet (520 m) above sea level.

Sinking Creek is a relatively small and overgrown stream upstream of Potter Run. There are also fences and fallen trees along the creek.

== Watershed ==
The watershed of Sinking Creek has an area of 40.70 square miles (105.4 km^{2}).

== Recreation ==
It is possible to canoe on at least 6.9 miles (11.1 km) of Sinking Creek during snowmelt or within one week of heavy rain. The creek's difficulty rating is 1. Edward Gertler describes the scenery along the creek as "good" in his book Keystone Canoeing.

== See also ==
- List of rivers of Pennsylvania
