= Penns Creek =

River in Pennsylvania, United States

Coordinates: 40°45′01″N 76°51′27″W

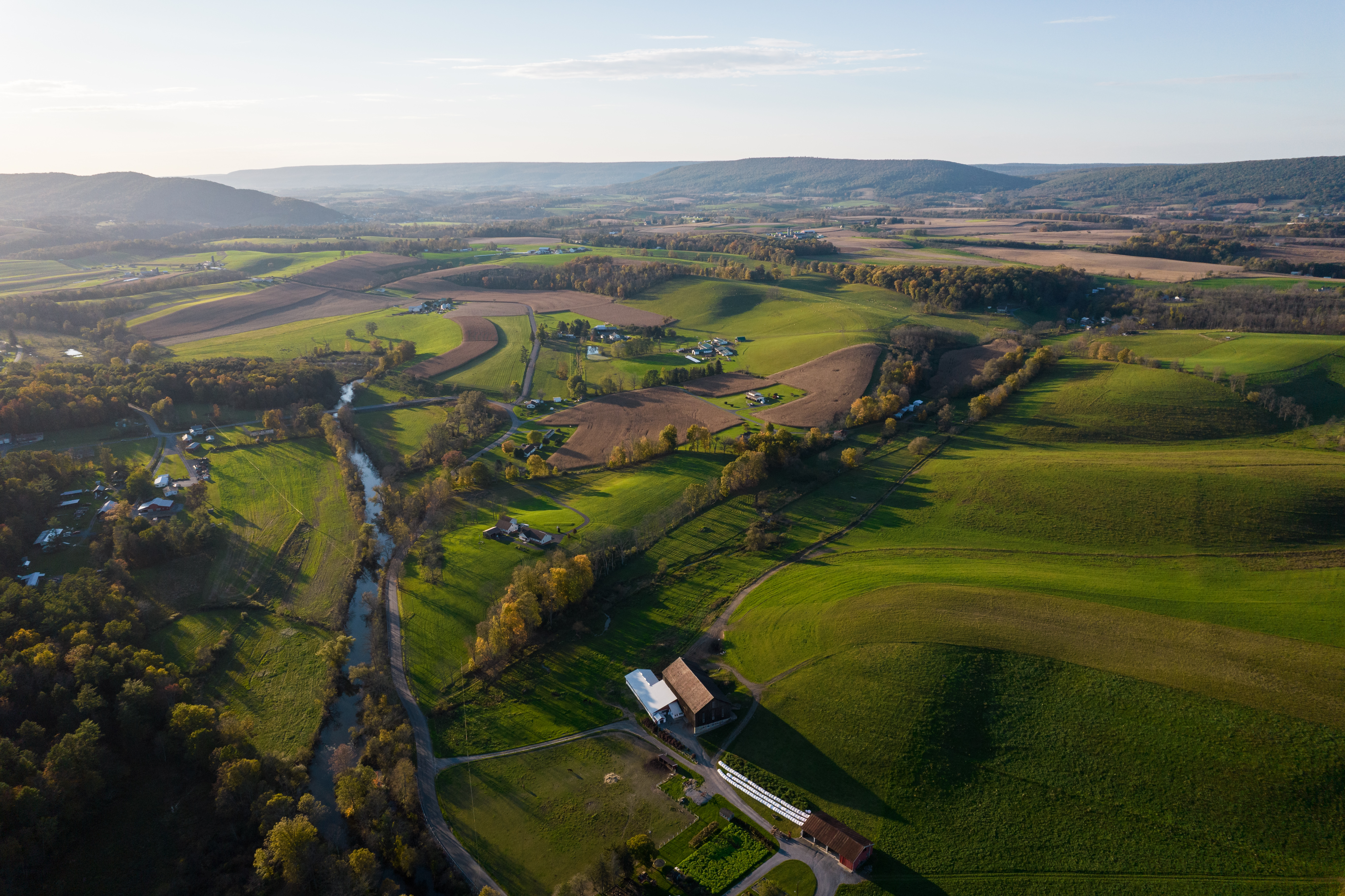
Penns Creek flowing through Penns Valley

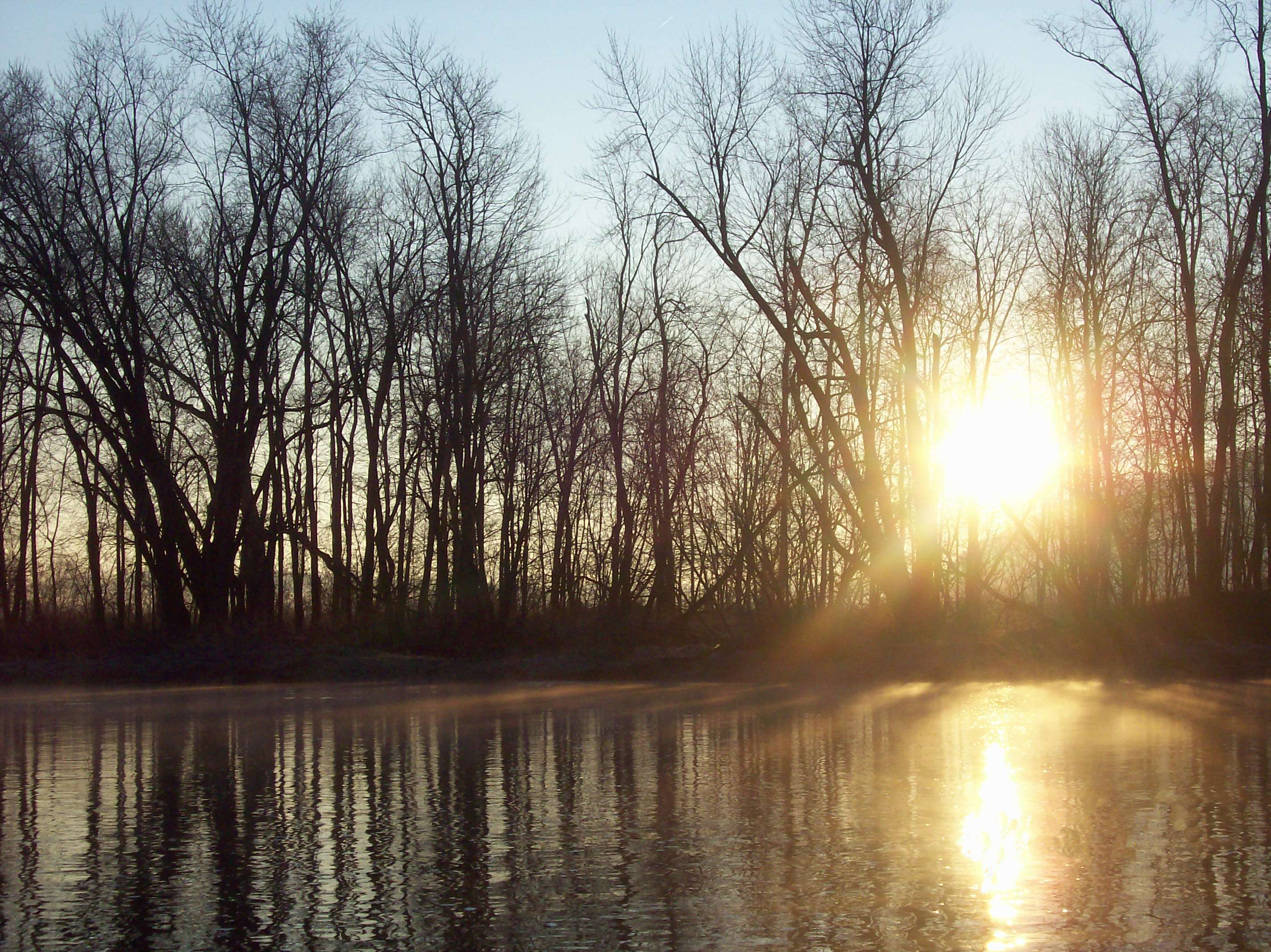
Sun rising, as seen from Penns Creek

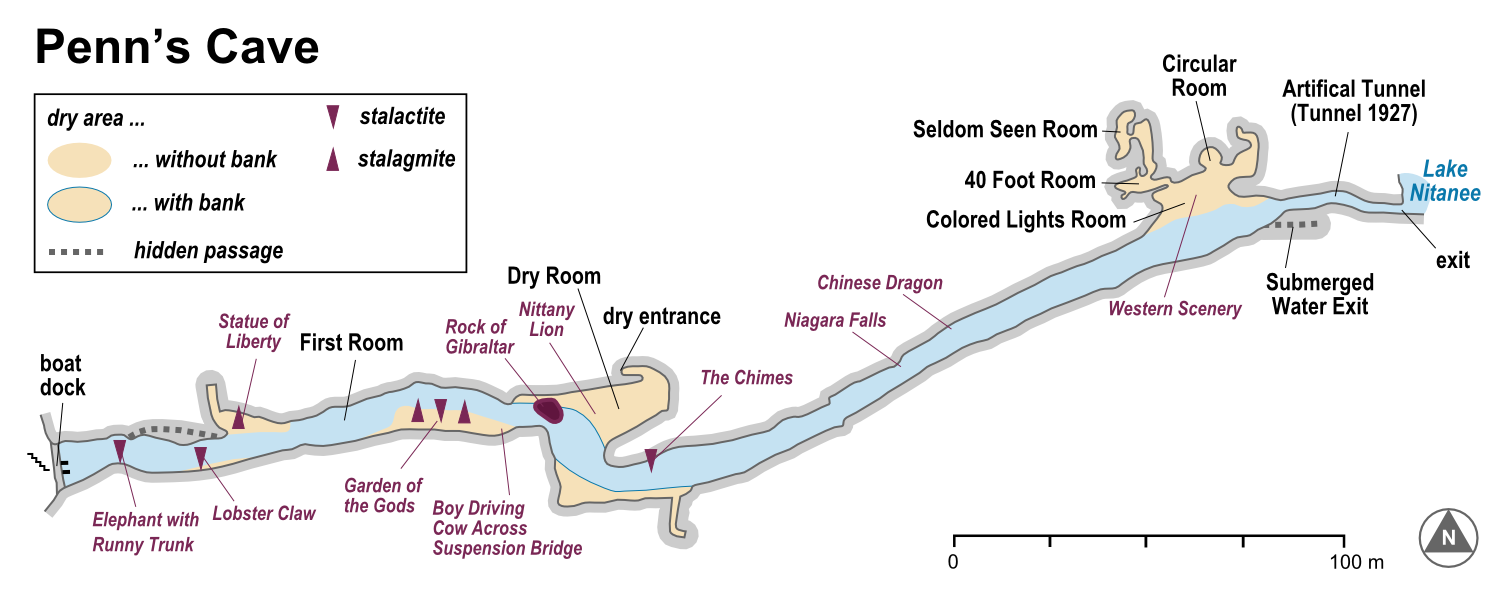
Map of Penns Cave

Penns Creek is a 67.1-mile-long (108.0 km) tributary of the Susquehanna River in central Pennsylvania in the United States.

The creek was called the Kaarondinhah by the Iroquois who were in possession of the Susquehanna Valley from the mid-17th to the mid-18th centuries. Between 1754, when the Iroquois sold most of the Susquehanna Valley including the creek to the provincial government of Pennsylvania, and 1772, it was called both Big Mahany and John Penn's Creek (after the younger brother of Pennsylvania founder William Penn) by the European settlers who moved there.

Penns Creek drains a watershed of approximately 163 square miles (420 km^{2}) in Snyder, Union, and Centre counties. It flows from its headwaters north of Spring Mills to the Susquehanna River, approximately 3.6 miles (5.8 km) downstream of Selinsgrove.

A large spring within Penn's Cave, a commercial cave that offers guided tours by boat, forms one source for this limestone creek.

Penns Creek is renowned as a popular fly fishing destination in the Northeast. It is well known amongst anglers for its prolific Green Drake hatch, which occurs in late May.

== Tributaries ==
(In order heading downstream)

- Sinking Creek
- Elk Creek
- Pine Creek
- Middle Creek

== Environmental issues ==
Ongoing pollution and soil erosion in the region continue to degrade the water quality and the environment locally as well as regionally. Farming, surface mining, wastewater treatment facilities and industrial spills are cited as contributing factors to loss of water quality. It also contributes to the pollution of the Chesapeake Bay. Controlling the wastewater discharges alone is expected to cost local taxpayers millions of dollars.

== Organizations ==
The Lower Penns Creek Watershed Association (LPCWA), the Susquehanna Greenway Partnership, and the Susquehanna River Basin Commission are organizations concerned with Penns Creek. The Snyder County Conservation District and the Union County Conservation District both have watershed specialists that participate in LPCWA.

== See also ==
- Mahanoy Creek, next tributary of the Susquehanna River going downriver
- Boile Run, next tributary of the Susquehanna River going upriver
- List of rivers of Pennsylvania
- Penn's Creek Massacre
