= Spring Mills, Pennsylvania =

Unincorporated community in Pennsylvania, US

- Census designated place
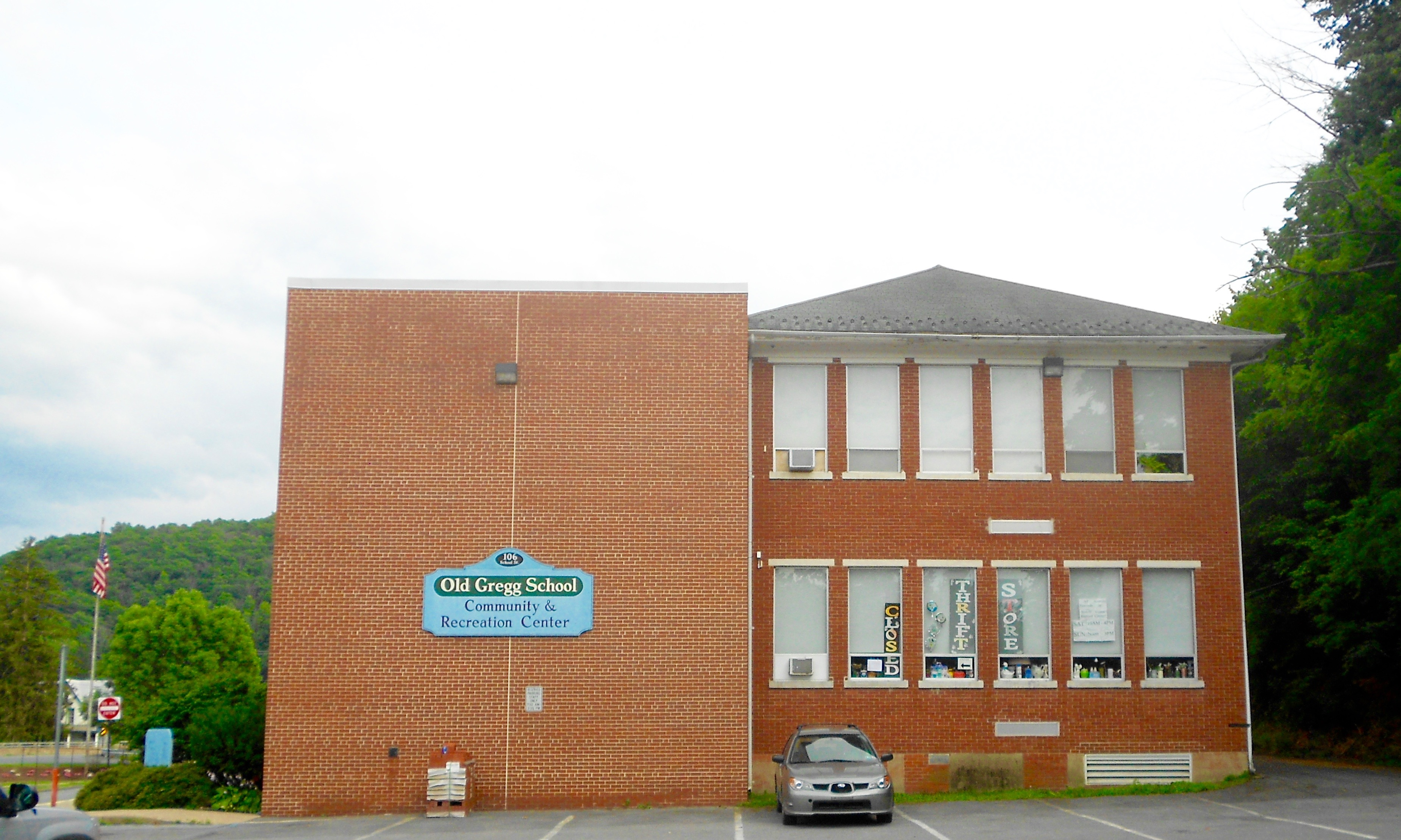
- Old Gregg School Community Center in Spring Mills, PA

- Location of Centre County in Pennsylvania
- Coordinates: 40°51′18″N 77°34′09″W
- Country: United States
- State: Pennsylvania
- County: Centre
- Township: Gregg

Area
  - Total: 0.44 sq mi (1.1 km^{2})
  - Land: 0.44 sq mi (1.1 km^{2})
  - Water: 0.0 sq mi (0 km^{2})
- Elevation: 1,100 ft (340 m)

Population (2010)
  - Total: 268
  - Density: 610/sq mi (240/km^{2})
- Time zone: UTC-5 (EST)
  - Summer (DST): UTC-4 (EDT)
- ZIP code: 16875
- Area code: Area code 814
- FIPS code: 42-73288
- GNIS feature ID: 1188247

Spring Mills is an unincorporated community and census-designated place (CDP) in Centre County, Pennsylvania, United States. It is part of the State College, Pennsylvania Metropolitan Statistical Area. The population was 268 at the 2010 census.

== Geography ==
Spring Mills is located in southeastern Centre County, near the center of Gregg Township. It is in the Penns Valley, at the confluence of Sinking Creek with Penns Creek. According to the United States Census Bureau, the CDP has a total area of 0.44 square miles (1.15 km^{2}), all land.

Pennsylvania Route 45 runs along the northern edge of the community, leading west 6 miles (10 km) to Centre Hall and 17 miles (27 km) to State College, and east 5 miles (8 km) to Millheim.

== Demographics ==
At the 2010 census there were 268 people, 109 households, and 83 families in the CDP. The population density was 577.0 inhabitants per square mile (222.8/km^{2}). There were 116 housing units at an average density of 249.7/sq mi (96.4/km^{2}). The racial makeup of the CDP was 99.6% White and 0.4% of two or more races. Hispanic or Latino of any race were 0.4%.

There were 109 households, 28.4% had children under the age of 18 living with them, 62.4% were married couples living together, 7.3% had a male householder with no wife present, 6.4% had a female householder with no husband present, and 23.9% were non-families. 20.2% of households were made up of individuals, and 10.1% were one person aged 65 or older. The average household size was 2.46 and the average family size was 2.83.

The age distribution was 18.7% under the age of 18, 10.4% from 18 to 24, 24.6% from 25 to 44, 28.8% from 45 to 64, and 17.5% 65 or older. The median age was 42 years. For every 100 females, there were 106.2 males. For every 100 females age 18 and over, there were 111.7 males.

The median household income was $38,542 and the median family income was $42,083. The per capita income for the CDP was $21,941. About 13.2% of families and 7.3% of the population were below the poverty line, including 7.5% of those under the age of 18 and 18.6% of those 65 or over.
