= Lower Augusta Township, Pennsylvania =

Township in Pennsylvania, US

Coordinates: 40°47′00″N 76°47′59″W

- Township
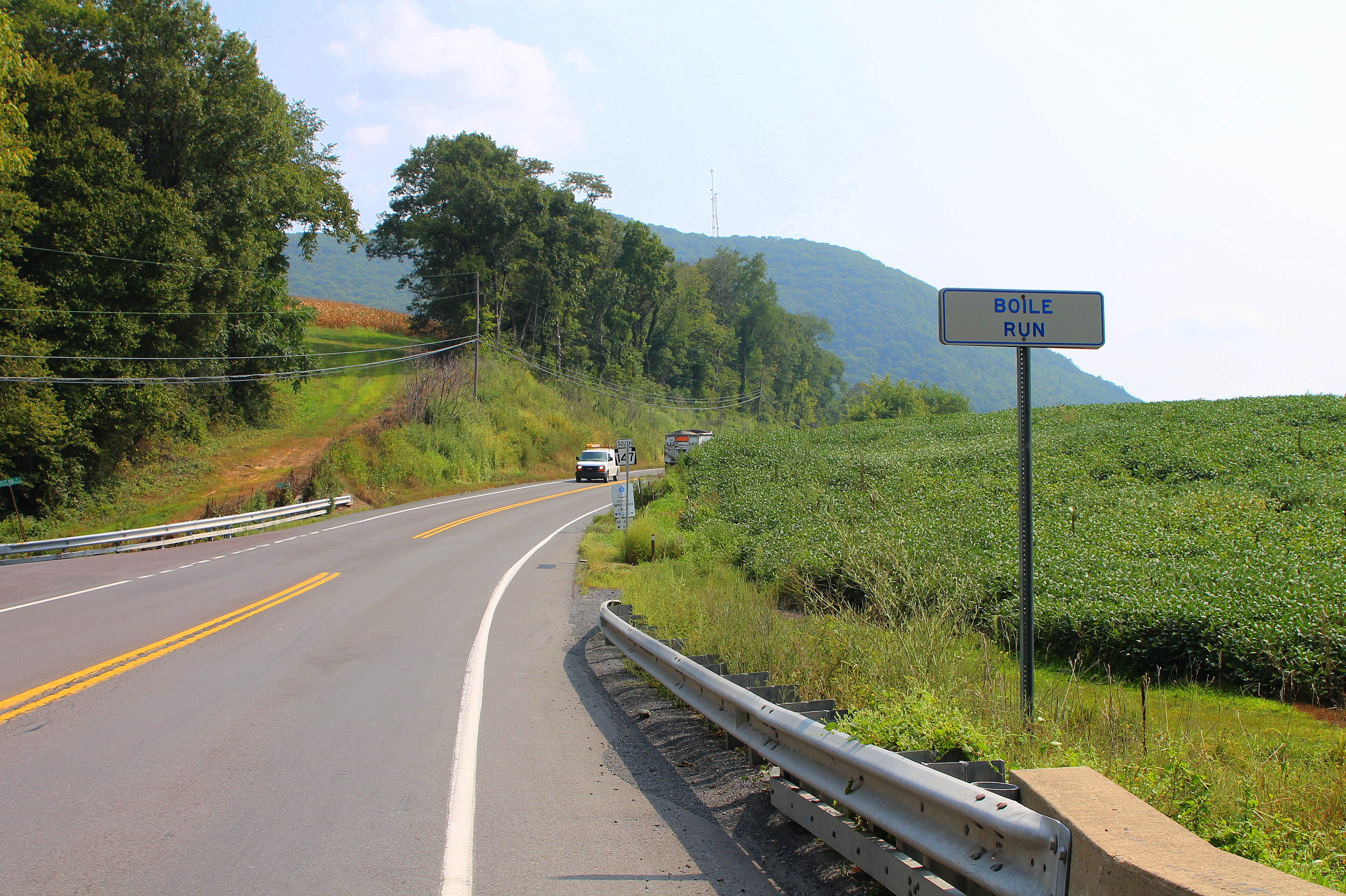
- Pennsylvania Route 147 in Lower Augusta Township, with Little Mountain in the background

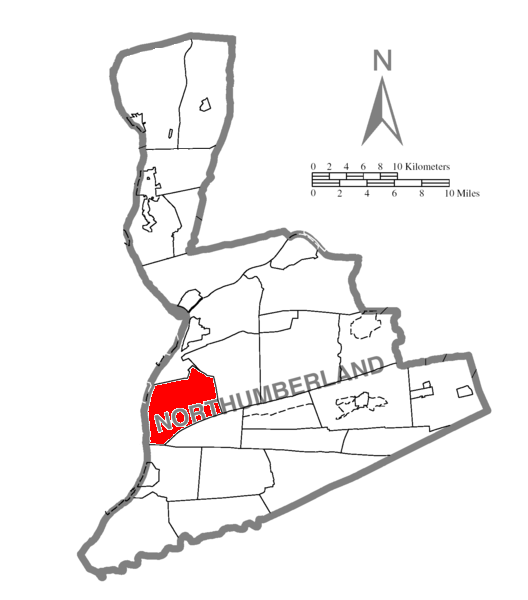
- Map of Northumberland County, Pennsylvania highlighting Lower Augusta Township

- Map of Northumberland County, Pennsylvania
- Country: United States
- State: Pennsylvania
- County: Northumberland
- Settled: 1794
- Incorporated: 1846

Government
  - Type: Board of Supervisors

Area
  - Total: 21.37 sq mi (55.35 km^{2})
  - Land: 19.08 sq mi (49.41 km^{2})
  - Water: 2.29 sq mi (5.94 km^{2})

Population (2010)
  - Total: 1,064
  - Estimate (2016): 1,038
  - Density: 54.4/sq mi (21.01/km^{2})
- Time zone: UTC-5 (Eastern (EST))
  - Summer (DST): UTC-4 (EDT)
- Area code: 570
- FIPS code: 42-097-44856
- Website: http://www.loweraugustatwp.org/

Lower Augusta Township is a township in Northumberland County, Pennsylvania, United States.

The population at the 2010 Census was 1,064, a decline from the figure of 1,079 tabulated in 2000.

== History ==
This township was formed in 1846 by the division of Augusta Township (one of the seven original townships of Northumberland County formed in 1772) into Upper and Lower sections.

== Geography ==
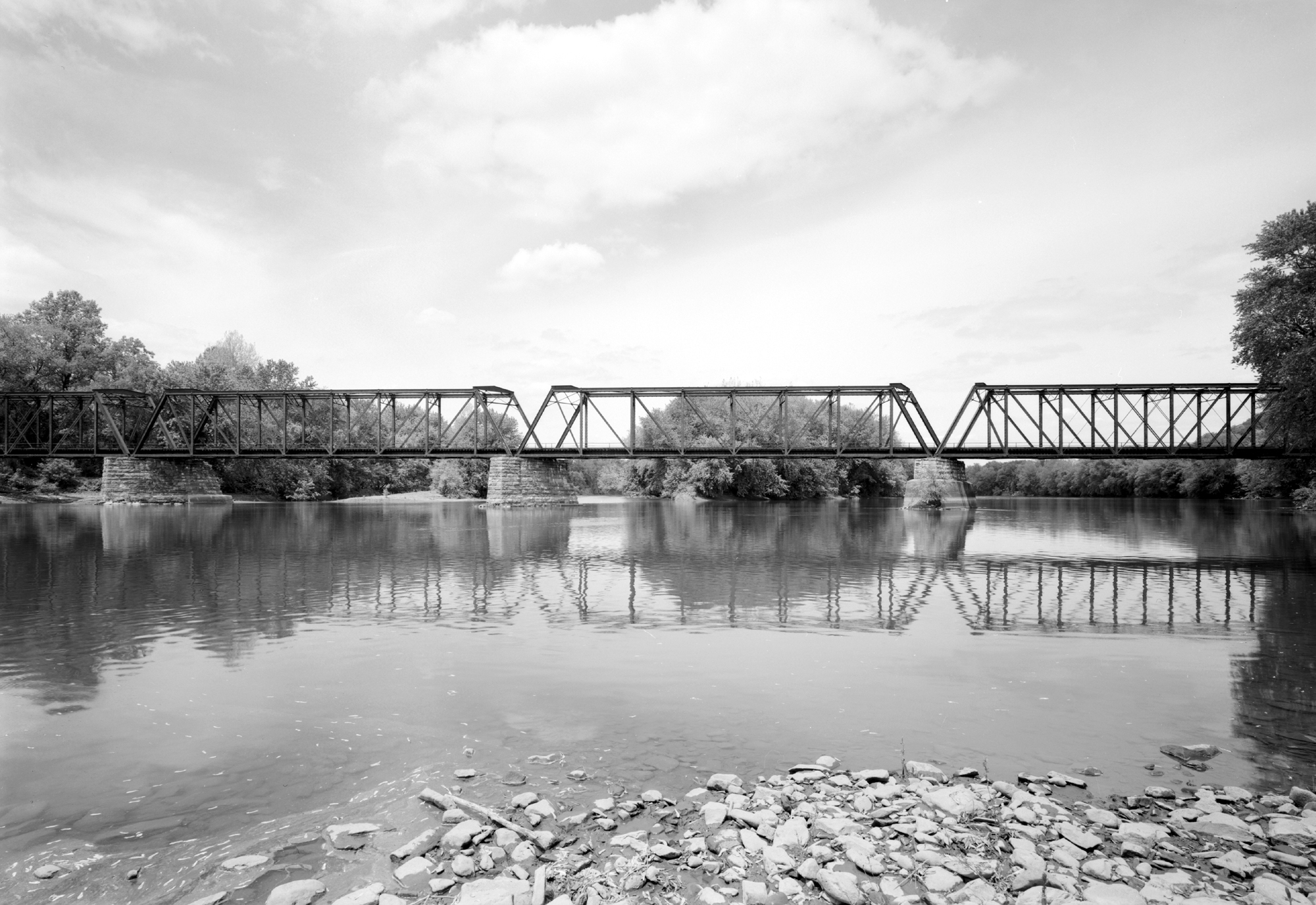
Selinsgrove Bridge

According to the United States Census Bureau, the township has a total area of 20.4 square miles (52.9 km^{2}), of which 18.2 square miles (47.3 km^{2}) is land and 2.2 square miles (5.6 km^{2}) (10.58%) is water.

== Demographics ==
Historical population
Census	Pop.	Note	%±
2010	1,064		—
2016 (est.)	1,038		−2.4%
U.S. Decennial Census

As of the census of 2000, there were 1,079 people, 401 households, and 322 families residing in the township.

The population density was 59.1 inhabitants per square mile (22.8/km^{2}). There were 425 housing units at an average density of 23.3/sq mi (9.0/km^{2}).

The racial makeup of the township was 98.42% White, 0.19% African American, 0.56% Asian, and 0.83% from two or more races. Hispanic or Latino of any race were 0.28% of the population.

There were 401 households, out of which 29.7% had children under the age of eighteen living with them; 71.3% were married couples living together, 4.0% had a female householder with no husband present, and 19.5% were non-families. 15.7% of all households were made up of individuals, and 5.7% had someone living alone who was sixty-five years of age or older.

The average household size was 2.68 and the average family size was 2.99.

In the township, the population was spread out, with 21.5% under the age of eighteen, 8.8% from eighteen to twenty-four, 25.8% from twenty-five to forty-four, 31.0% from forty-five to sixty-four, and 13.0% who were sixty-five years of age or older. The median age was forty-one years.

For every one hundred females there were 103.6 males. For every one hundred females who were aged eighteen or older, there were 104.1 males.

The median income for a household in the township was $41,087, and the median income for a family was $44,417. Males had a median income of $30,969 compared with that of $20,147 for females.

The per capita income for the township was $16,877.

Roughly 1.5% of families and 2.7% of the population were living below the poverty line, including 0.4% of those who were under the age of eighteen and 5.6% of those who were aged sixty-five or older.
