= Centralia, Pennsylvania =

Depopulated borough in the United States

Centralia, Pennsylvania Bull's Head
- Borough
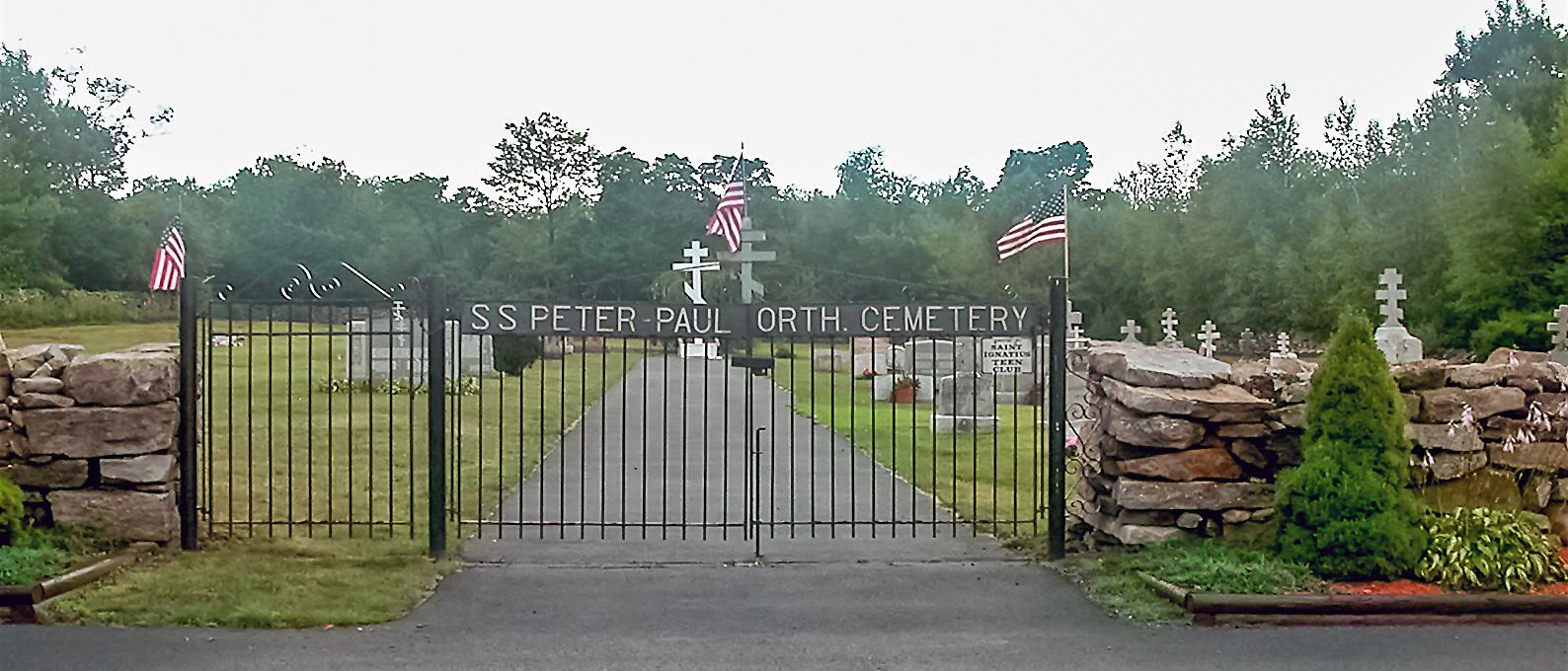
- Cemetery at Centralia

- Location of Centralia in Columbia County, Pennsylvania

- Location of Centralia in Pennsylvania Centralia (the United States)
- Coordinates: 40°48′12″N 76°20′30″W
- Country: United States
- State: Pennsylvania
- County: Columbia
- Settled: 1841 (as Bull's Head)
- Incorporated: 1866 (Borough of Centralia)
- Founder: Jonathan Faust

Government
  - Mayor: Collapsed Authority (Note: Carl Womer was the last official mayor of Centralia, until his death in 2014.)

Area
  - Total: 0.24 sq mi (0.62 km^{2})
  - Land: 0.24 sq mi (0.62 km^{2})
  - Water: 0 sq mi (0.00 km^{2}) 0%
- Elevation: 1,467 ft (447 m)

Population (2020)
  - Total: 5
  - Estimate (2024): 1
  - Density: 20.9/sq mi (8.08/km^{2})
- Time zone: UTC-5 (Eastern (EST))
  - Summer (DST): UTC-4 (EDT)
- ZIP Code: 17927 (discontinued 2002); 17921 (Ashland 2002–present)
- Area code: 570
- FIPS code: 42-12312

Centralia (/sɛn.ˈtreɪ.li.ə/, sen-TRAY-li-ə) is a borough and near-ghost town in Columbia County, Pennsylvania, United States, part of Northeastern Pennsylvania. Its population declined from 1,000 in 1980 to five residents in 2020 because of a coal mine fire burning beneath the borough since 1962. Centralia, part of the Bloomsburg–Berwick metropolitan area, is the least-populated municipality in Pennsylvania. It is completely surrounded by Conyngham Township.

All real estate in the borough was claimed under eminent domain in 1992 and condemned by the Commonwealth of Pennsylvania. Centralia's ZIP Code was discontinued by the Postal Service in 2002. State and local officials reached an agreement with the then seven remaining residents on October 29, 2013, allowing them to remain in Centralia until their deaths, after which the rights to their houses will be taken through eminent domain. As of 2020, only five residents remain. In the 2024 American Community Survey (ACS), only one resident remains in Centralia.

== History ==
=== Early history ===
Several Native American tribes in what is now Columbia County sold much of the land in Northeastern Pennsylvania, including the Centralia valley, to colonial agents in 1749 for £500. In 1770, during the construction of the Reading Road, which stretched from Reading to Fort Augusta (present-day Sunbury), settlers surveyed and explored the land. A large portion of the Reading Road was developed later as Route 61, the main highway east into and south out of Centralia.

In 1793, Robert Morris, a hero of the Revolutionary War and a signatory of the Declaration of Independence, acquired a third of Centralia's valley land. When he declared bankruptcy in 1798, the land was surrendered to the Bank of the United States. A Philadelphia based sea captain, trader and banker who had been born in France, named Stephen Girard, purchased Morris' lands for $30,000, including 68 tracts east of Morris'. He had learned that there was anthracite coal in the region.

The Centralia coal deposits were largely overlooked before the construction of the Mine Run Railroad in 1854. In 1832, Johnathan Faust opened the Bull's Head Tavern in what was called Roaring Creek Township; this gave the town its first name, Bull's Head. In 1842, Centralia's land was bought by the Locust Mountain Coal and Iron Company. Alexander Rae, a mining engineer, moved his family in and began planning a village, laying out streets and lots for development. Rae named the town Centreville, but in 1865 changed it to Centralia because the U.S. Post Office already had a Centreville in Schuylkill County. The Mine Run Railroad was built in 1854 to transport coal out of the valley.

=== Mining begins ===
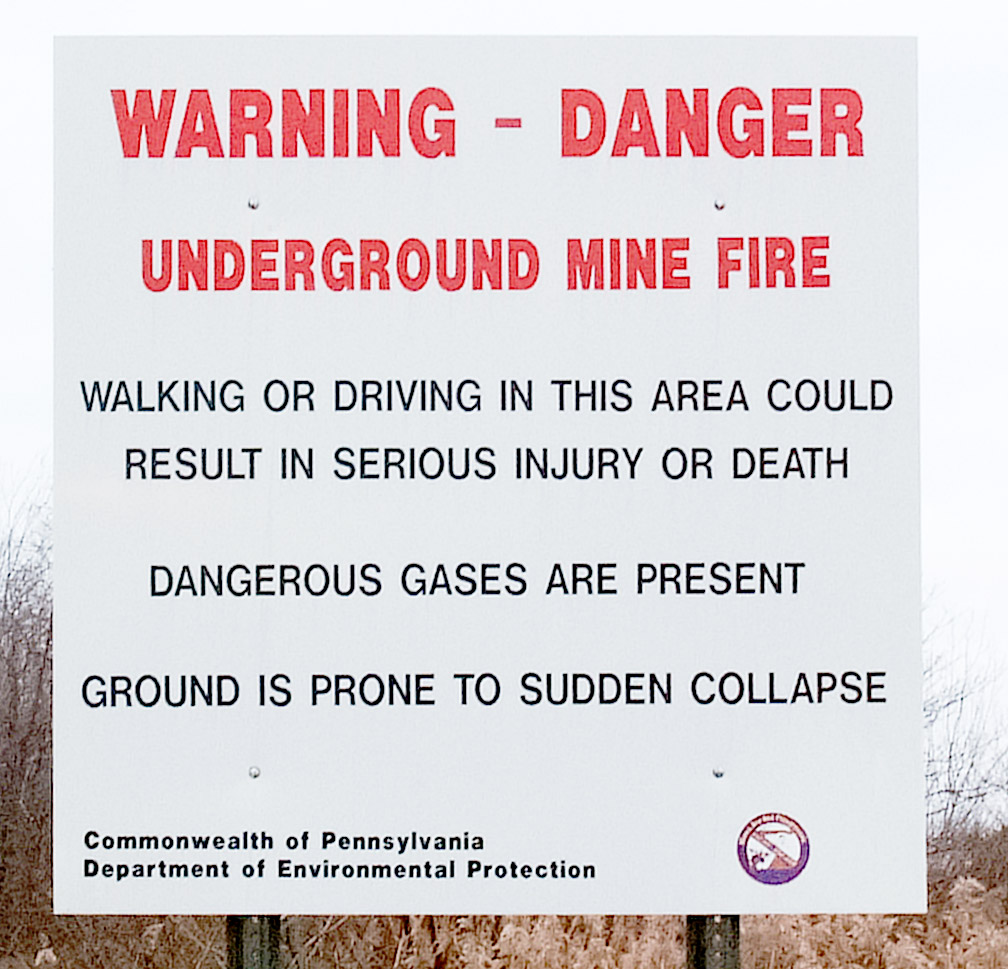
A warning sign in Centralia

The first two mines in Centralia opened in 1856, the Locust Run Mine and the Coal Ridge Mine. Afterward came the Hazeldell Colliery Mine in 1860, the Centralia Mine in 1862, and the Continental Mine in 1863. The Continental was located on Stephen Girard's former estate. Branching from the Lehigh Valley Railroad, the Lehigh and Mahanoy Railroad was constructed to Centralia in 1865; it enabled transport and expansion of Centralia's coal sales to markets in eastern Pennsylvania.

Centralia was incorporated as a borough in 1866. Its principal employer was the anthracite coal industry. Alexander Rae, the town's founder, was murdered in his buggy by members of the Molly Maguires on October 17, 1868, during a trip between Centralia and Mount Carmel. Three men were eventually convicted of his death and were hanged in the county seat of Bloomsburg, on March 25, 1878.

Several other murders and incidents of arson also took place during the violence, as Centralia was a hotbed of Molly Maguires activity during the 1860s to organize a mineworkers union in order to improve wages and working conditions. A legend among locals in Centralia tells that Father Daniel Ignatius McDermott, the first Roman Catholic priest to call Centralia home, cursed the land in retaliation for being assaulted by three members of the Maguires in 1869. McDermott said that there would be a day when St. Ignatius Roman Catholic Church would be the only structure remaining in Centralia. Many of the Molly Maguires' leaders were hanged in 1877, ending their crimes. Legends say that a number of descendants of the Molly Maguires still lived in Centralia up until the 1980s.

According to numbers of federal census records, the town of Centralia reached its maximum population of 2,761 in 1890. At its peak, the town had seven churches, five hotels, 27 saloons, two theaters, a bank, a post office, and 14 general and grocery stores. Thirty-seven years later the production of anthracite coal had reached its peak in Pennsylvania. In the following years, production declined, as many young miners from Centralia enlisted in the military when the US entered World War I.

The Wall Street Crash of 1929 resulted in the Lehigh Valley Coal Company closing five of its Centralia-local mines. Bootleg miners continued mining in several idle mines, using techniques such as what was called "pillar-robbing," where miners would extract coal from coal pillars left in mines to support their roofs. This caused the collapse of many idle mines, further complicating the prevention of the mine fire in 1962. Efforts to seal off the abandoned mines ran into the collapsed areas.

In 1950, Centralia Council acquired the rights to all anthracite beneath Centralia through a state law passed in 1949 that enabled the transaction. That year, the federal census counted 1,986 residents in Centralia.

Coal mining continued in Centralia until the 1960s, when most of the companies shut down. Bootleg mining continued until 1982, and strip and open-pit mining are still active in the area. An underground mine about three miles to the west employs about 40 people.

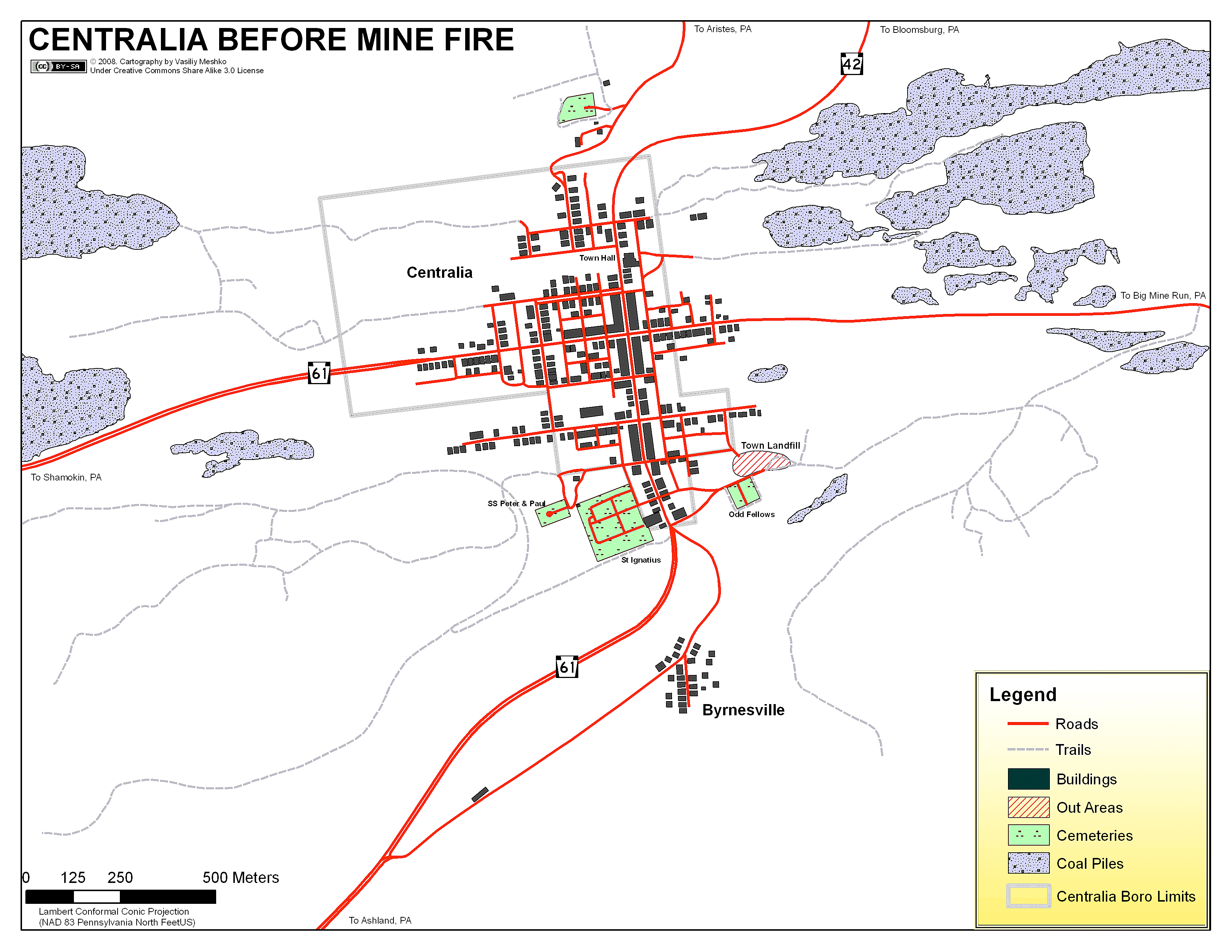
Centralia area showing conditions before mine fire

Rail service ended in 1966. Centralia operated its own school district, including elementary schools and a high school. There were also two Catholic parochial schools. By 1980, it had 1,012 residents. Another 500 or 600 lived nearby.

=== Mine fire ===
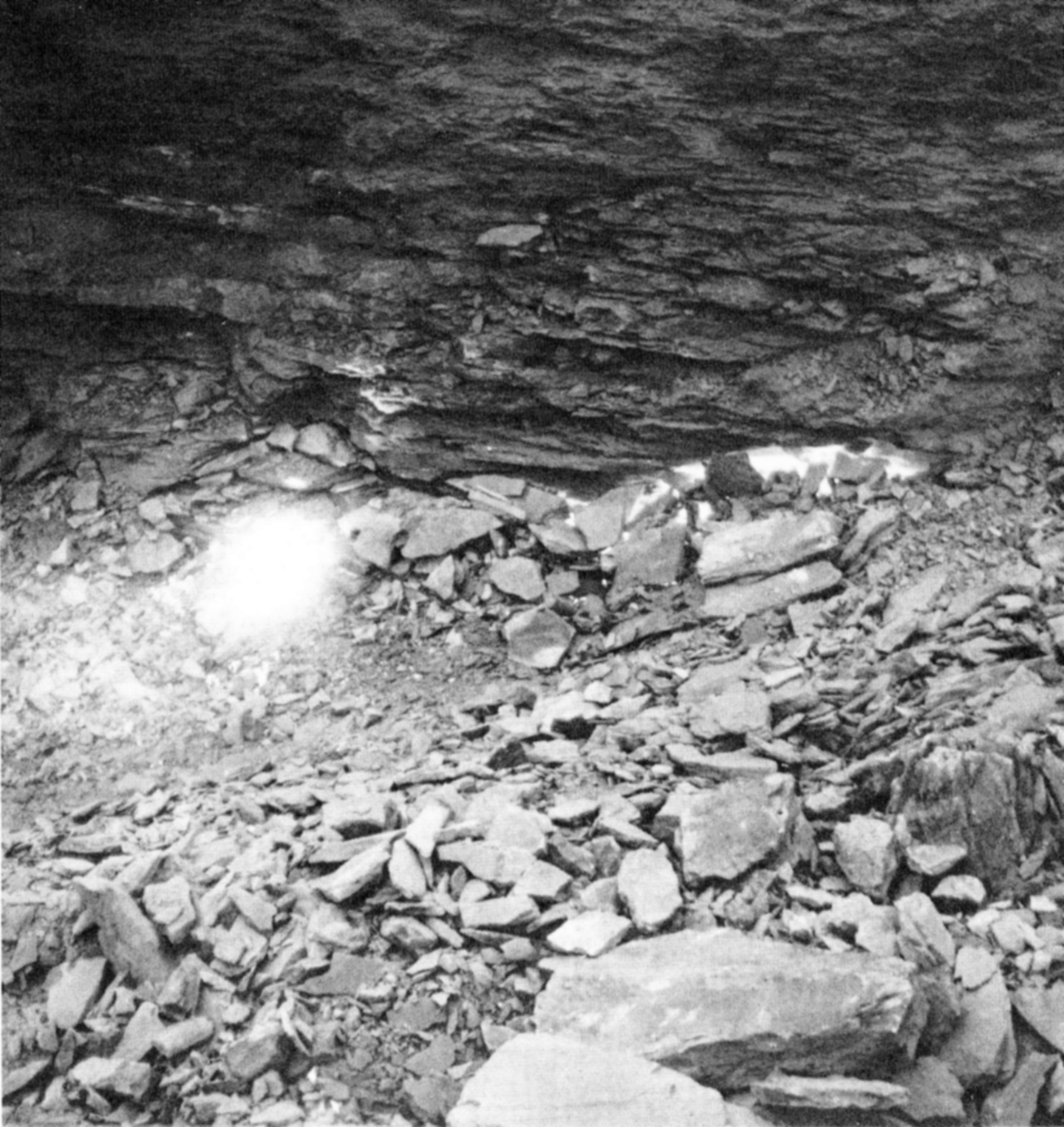
A small part of the Centralia mine fire as it appeared after being exposed during an excavation in 1969

==== Triggers ====
Analysts disagree about the specific cause of the Centralia fire. David Dekok, author of Fire Underground: The Ongoing Tragedy of the Centralia Mine Fire, concluded that it started with an attempt to clean up the town landfill. In May 1962, the Centralia Borough Council hired five members of the volunteer fire company to clean up the town landfill, located in an abandoned strip-mine pit next to the Odd Fellows Cemetery just outside the borough limits. This had been done prior to Memorial Day in previous years, when the landfill was in a different location.

On May 27, 1962, the firefighters, as they had in the past, set the dump on fire and let it burn for some time. Unlike in previous years, however, the fire was not fully extinguished. An unsealed opening in the pit allowed the fire to enter the labyrinth of abandoned coal mines beneath Centralia.

By contrast, other sources claim that the fire had started the previous day, when a trash hauler dumped hot ash or coal discarded from coal burners into the open trash pit. The author of The Day the Earth Caved In noted that borough council minutes from June 4, 1962, referred to two fires at the dump and that five firefighters had submitted bills for "fighting the fire at the landfill area." The borough, by law, was responsible for installing a fire-resistant clay barrier between each layer of the landfill, but fell behind schedule, leaving the barrier incomplete. This allowed the hot coals to penetrate the coal seam underneath the pit and start the subsequent subterranean fire.

Another theory proposes that the Bast Colliery fire of 1932 was never fully extinguished, and that fire reached the landfill area by 1962; however, a miner named Frank Jurgill Sr. disputed that theory. Jurgill claimed that he operated a bootleg mine with his brother near the landfill from 1960 to 1962. If the Bast Colliery fire had not been extinguished, the brothers would likely have been overcome or killed by the noxious gases via many interconnected tunnels in the area.

==== Immediate effects ====
In 1979, locals became aware of the scale of the problem when a gas-station owner, then-mayor John Coddington, inserted a dipstick into one of his underground tanks to check the fuel level. When he withdrew it, it seemed hot. He lowered a thermometer into the tank on a string and was shocked to discover that the temperature of the gasoline in the tank was 172 °F (77.8 °C).

Statewide attention to the fire began to increase, culminating on February 14, 1981, when a 12-year-old resident named Todd Domboski fell into a sinkhole, 4 feet (1.2 m) wide by 150 feet (46 m) deep, that suddenly opened beneath his feet in his grandmother’s backyard. Domboski saved himself by grabbing onto a tree root, and his cousin, 14-year-old Eric Wolfgang, pulled him out of the hole to safety. The plume of hot steam billowing from the hole was tested and found to contain a lethal level of carbon monoxide. At the time of the sinkhole collapse, U.S. Rep. James Nelligan and Governor Dick Thornburgh were visiting the town to assess the area.

Although there was physical, visible evidence of the fire, residents of Centralia were bitterly divided over the question of whether the fire posed a direct threat to the town. In The Real Disaster Is Above Ground, Steve Kroll-Smith and Steve Couch identified at least six community groups, each organized around varying interpretations of the amount and kind of risk posed by the fire. In 1983, the U.S. Congress allocated more than $42 million for relocation efforts. Nearly all of the residents accepted the government's buyout offers. More than 1,000 people moved out of the town and 500 structures were demolished. By 1990, the census recorded 63 remaining residents.

In 1992, Pennsylvania governor Bob Casey invoked eminent domain on all property in the borough, condemning all the buildings within. A subsequent legal effort by residents to overturn the action failed. In 2002, the U.S. Postal Service discontinued Centralia's ZIP code, 17927. Only 16 homes were still standing by 2006, which was reduced to 11 by 2009 when Governor Ed Rendell began the formal eviction of the remaining Centralia residents. State and local officials reached an agreement with the then seven remaining residents on October 29, 2013, allowing them to remain in Centralia until their deaths, after which the rights to their houses will be taken through eminent domain. Only five homes remained by 2010.

The Centralia mine fire extended beneath the village of Byrnesville, a short distance to the south, and required it also to be abandoned.

=== Condemnation and abandonment ===
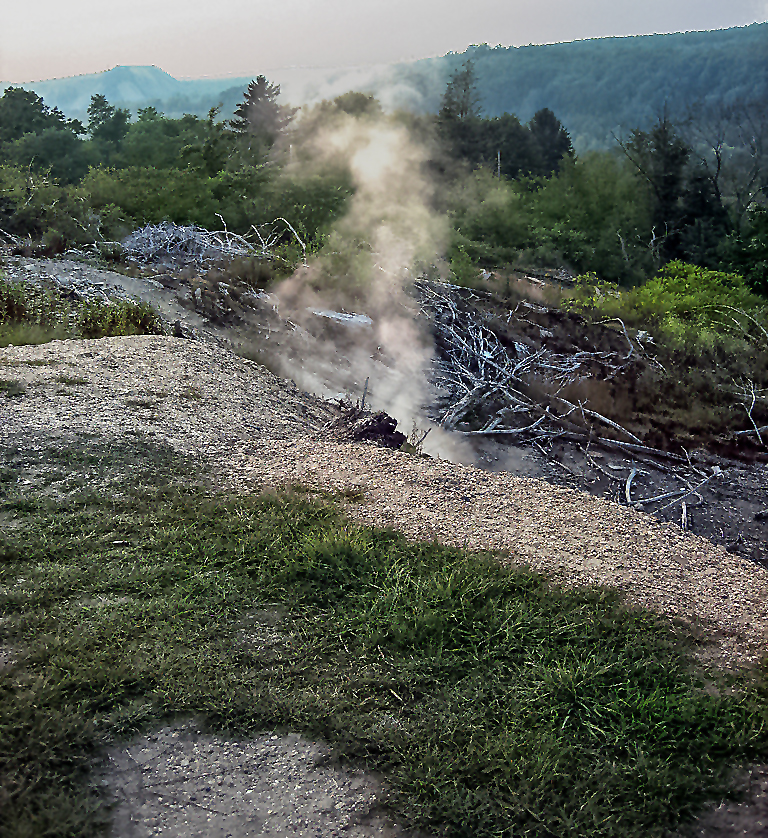
Toxic gas and smoke rising from the ground above the underground fire in 2006

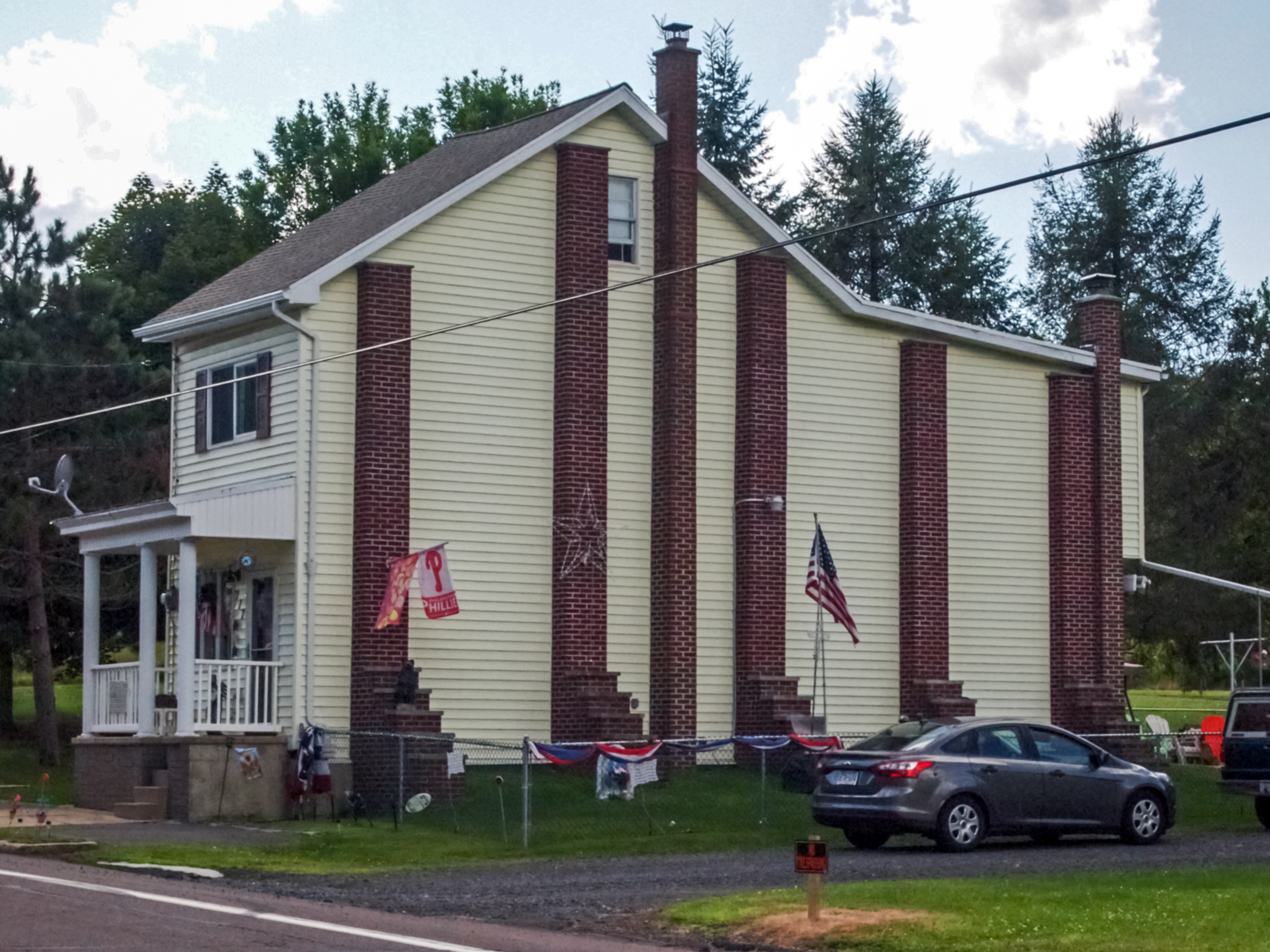
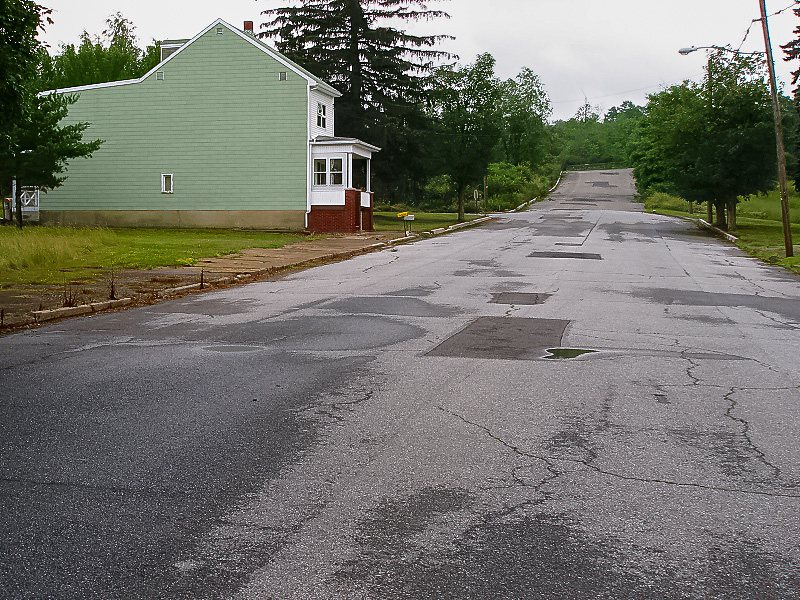
Separated duplex houses: brick buttresses were added to support the shared wall after removal of the attached house; an unbuttressed side of a similar house on an otherwise deserted street

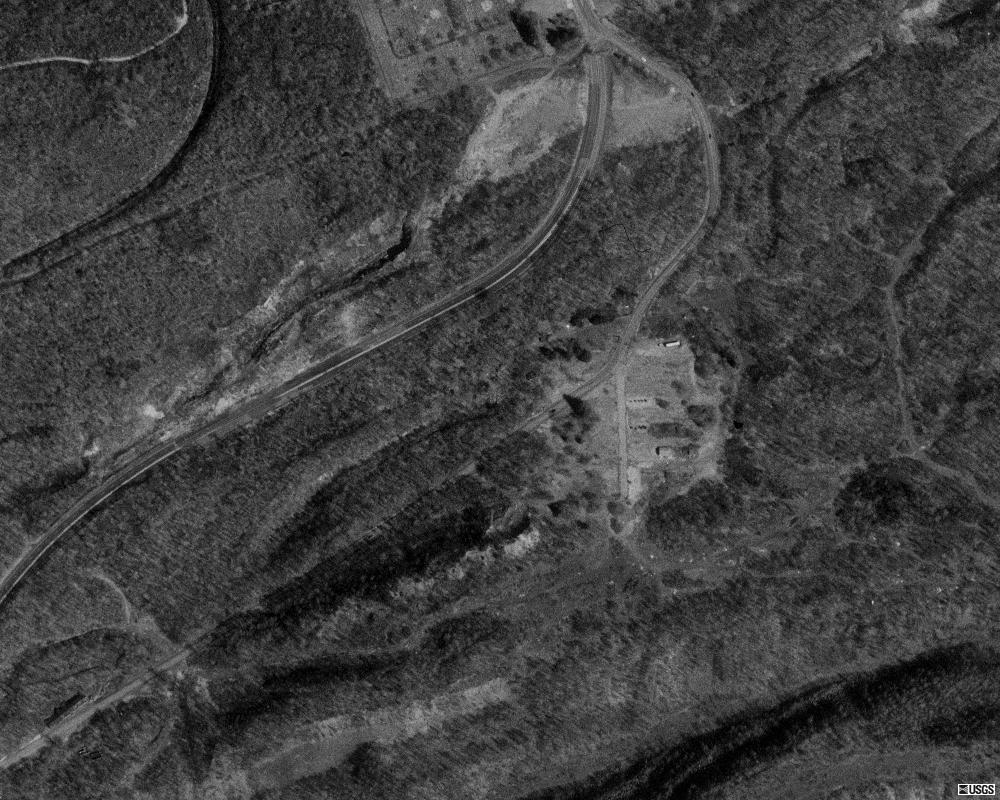
1999 photo showing the abandoned highway and its replacement

The underground fire is still burning; in 2006, it was reported that it is expected to do so for another 250 years. The Commonwealth of Pennsylvania did not renew the relocation contract at the end of 2005. The only indications of the fire, which underlies some 400 acres (160 ha) spreading along four fronts, are low round metal steam vents in the south of the borough. Additional smoke and steam can be seen coming from an abandoned portion of Pennsylvania Route 61, the area just behind the hilltop cemetery, and other cracks in the ground scattered about the area. Several signs warn of underground fire, unstable ground, and dangerous levels of carbon monoxide.

==== Town and residents ====
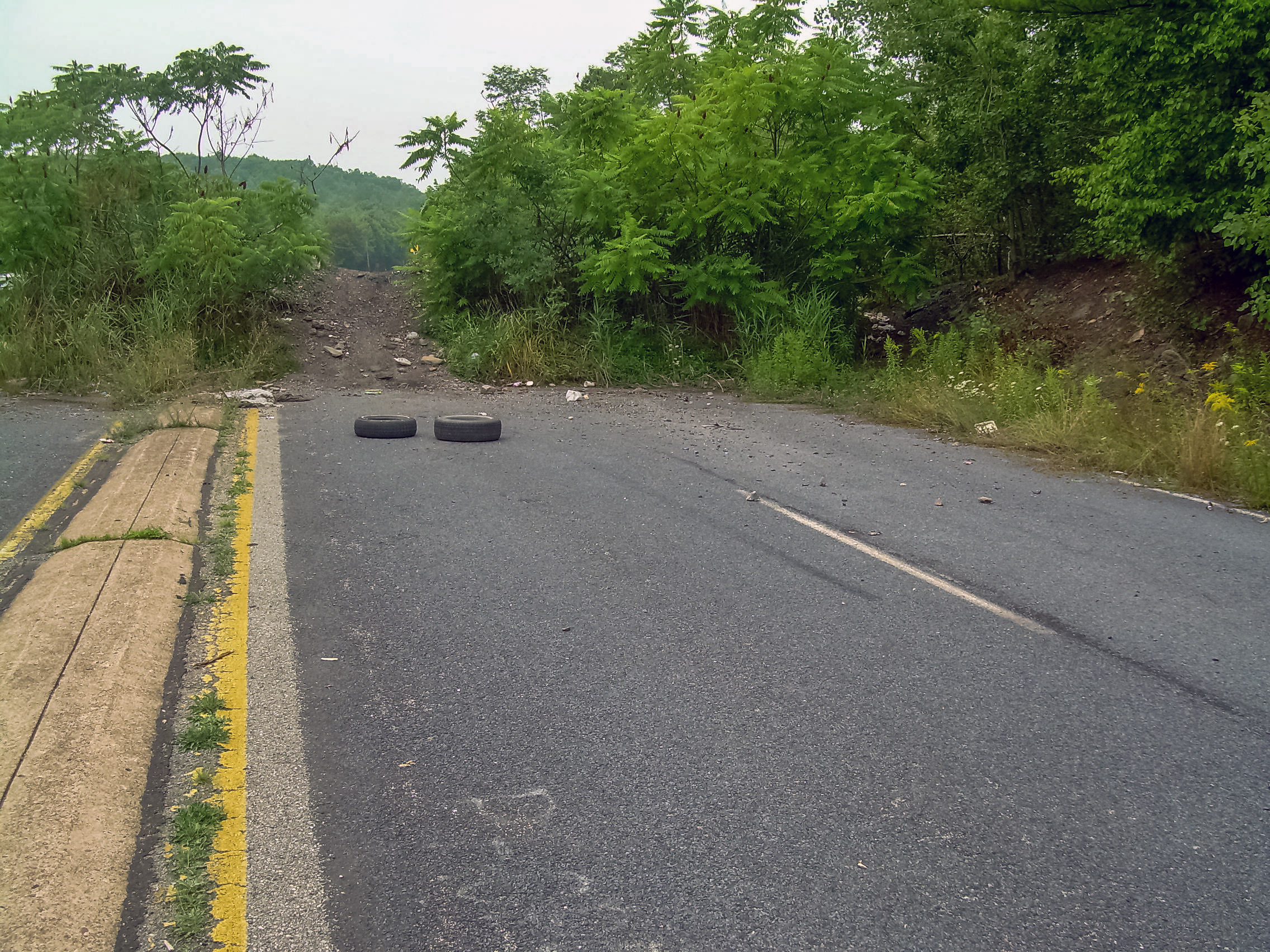
A berm blocks entry to the abandoned section of Route 61

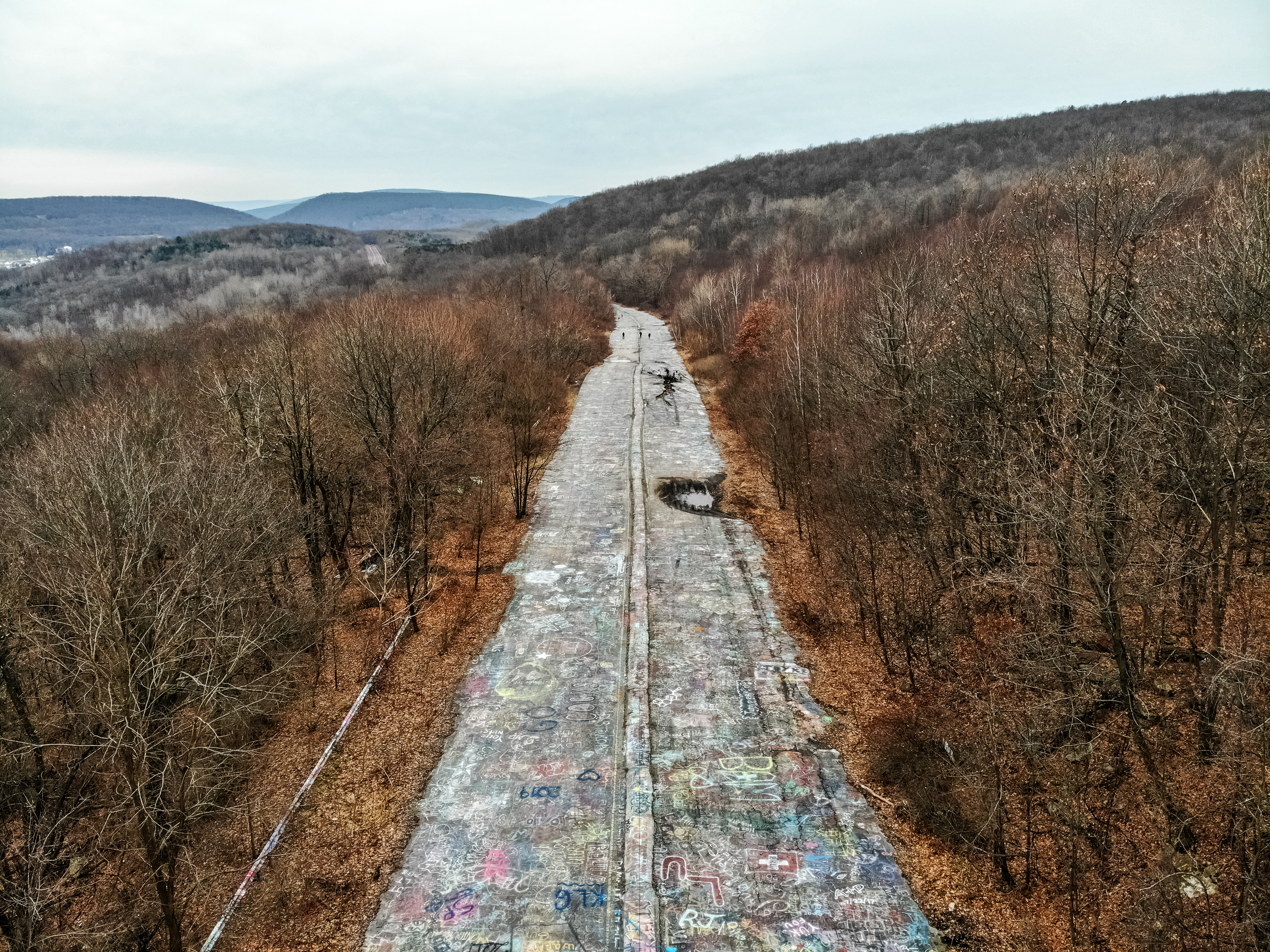
Drone photo of the former "Graffiti Highway" near Centralia in 2019, before it was mostly buried by several hundred access-denial berms

Few homes remain standing in Centralia. Most of the abandoned buildings have been demolished by the Columbia County Redevelopment Authority or reclaimed by nature. At a casual glance, the area now appears to be a field with many paved streets running through it. Some areas are being filled with new-growth forest.

The last remaining house on Locust Avenue was demolished in September 2007. It was notable for a period for the five chimney-like support buttresses along each of two opposite sides of the house. The house had formerly been supported by a row of adjacent buildings. Another house with similar buttresses was visible from the northern side of the cemetery, just north of the burning, partially subsumed hillside.

Residents John Comarnisky and John Lokitis Jr. were evicted in May and July 2009, respectively. In May 2009, the remaining residents mounted another legal effort to reverse the 1992 eminent domain claim. In 2010, only five homes remained as state officials tried to vacate the remaining residents and demolish what was left of the town. In March 2011, a federal judge refused to issue an injunction that would have stopped the condemnation.

In February 2012, the Commonwealth Court ruled that a declaration of taking could not be re-opened or set aside on the basis that the purpose for the condemnation no longer exists; seven people, including the borough council president, had filed suit claiming the condemnation was no longer needed because the underground fire had moved and the air quality in the borough was the same as that in Lancaster. In October 2013, the remaining residents settled their lawsuit, receiving $218,000 in compensation for the value of their homes, along with $131,500 to settle additional claims, and the right to stay in their homes for the rest of their lives.

==== Route 61 ====
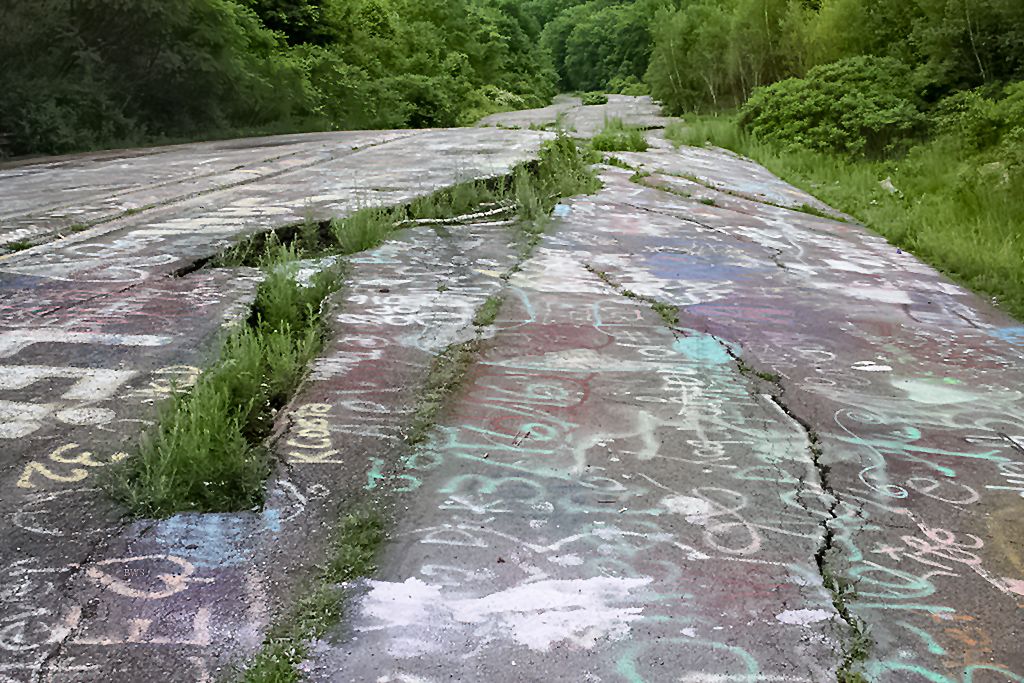
Abandoned section of Pennsylvania Route 61 above a coal seam fire

Pennsylvania Route 61 was repaired several times until it was closed. Smoke and steam caused extensive cracking in the pavement, which led to frequent closure. The current route was formerly a detour around the damaged portion during the repairs and became a permanent route in 1993. The damaged portion of Route 61 was abandoned, and became known as Graffiti Highway. Access berms were placed at both ends of the former route, effectively blocking off the area permanently to vehicular traffic. Pedestrian traffic was still possible due to small openings about two feet wide at the northern and southern terminus of the abandoned stretch of road.

In April 2020, amidst the early part of the COVID-19 pandemic, the property's current owners made the decision to cover over the graffiti on the highway section of old Route 61. Several hundred mounds of dirt were laid over the area, thus ending a decades-long fascination with the desolate stretch of road. Google Maps overhead satellite-view imagery copyright-dated 2023 shows the former Graffiti Highway almost entirely buried under hundreds of access-denial berms.

=== Time capsule ===
After someone had attempted to unearth and steal it in May 2014, the town's residents and former residents decided in October 2014 to open a time capsule buried in 1966. The capsule was not scheduled to be opened until 2016 (50 years after it was buried). Items found in the footlocker-sized capsule, which had been inundated with about 12 inches (30 cm) of water, included a miner's helmet, a miner's lamp, some coal, a Bible, local souvenirs, and a pair of bloomers signed by the men of Centralia in 1966.

== Mineral rights ==
Several current and former Centralia residents believe the state's eminent domain claim was a plot to gain the mineral rights to the anthracite coal beneath the borough. Residents have asserted its value to be in the hundreds of millions of dollars, although the exact amount of coal is not known.

== Demographics ==
Historical population
Census	Pop.	Note	%±
1870	1,342		—
1880	1,886		40.5%
1890	2,761		46.4%
1900	2,048		−25.8%
1910	2,429		18.6%
1920	2,336		−3.8%
1930	2,446		4.7%
1940	2,449		0.1%
1950	1,986		−18.9%
1960	1,435		−27.7%
1970	1,165		−18.8%
1980	1,017		−12.7%
1990	63		−93.8%
2000	21		−66.7%
2010	10		−52.4%
2020	5		−50.0%
2024 (est.)	1	▼	−80.0%

A sizeable minority of the population historically have been of Ukrainian or Russian descent, with the town once having both a Ukrainian Greek Catholic church (built 1911, still standing) and a Russian Orthodox church (built 1916, demolished 1986).

=== 2000 census ===
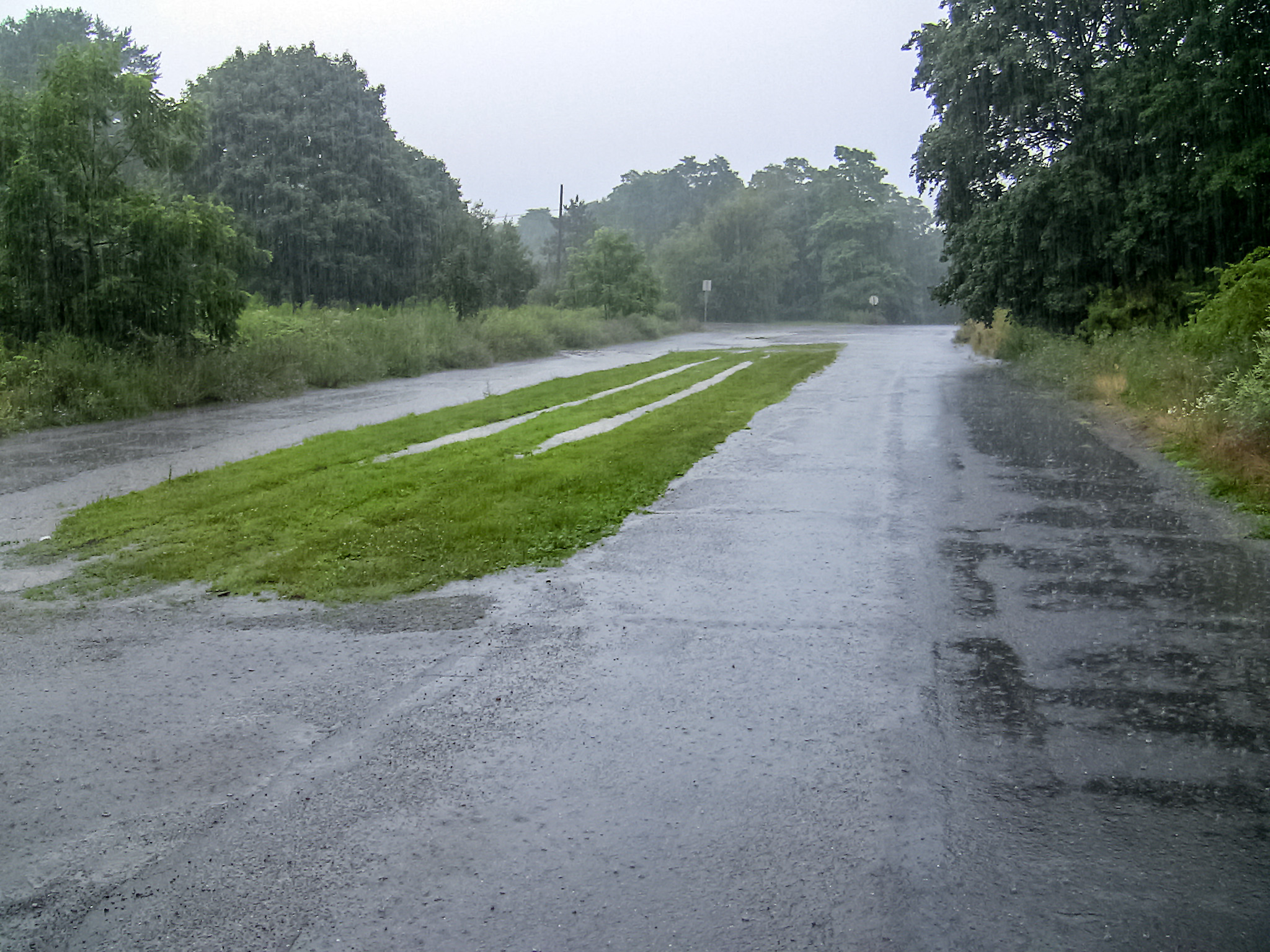
Abandoned section of Railroad Avenue in Centralia, 2016

As of the census of 2000, there were 21 people, 10 households, and seven families residing in the borough. The population density was 87.5 inhabitants per square mile (33.8/km^{2}). There were 16 housing units at an average density of 66.7 inhabitants per square mile (25.8/km^{2}). The racial makeup of the borough was 100% white.

There were 10 households, out of which one (10%) had children under the age of 18 living with them, five (50%) were married couples living together, one had a female householder with no partner present, and three (30%) were non-families. Three of the households were made up of individuals, and one had someone living alone who was 65 years of age or older. The average household size was 2.10, and the average family size was 2.57.

In the borough, the population was spread out as follows: one resident under the age of 18, one from 18 to 24, four from 25 to 44, seven from 45 to 64, and eight who were 65 years of age or older. The median age was 62 years. There were 10 females and 11 males, with one male under the age of 18.

The median income for a household in the borough was $23,750, and the median income for a family was $28,750. The per capita income for the borough was $16,083. All of the population was below the poverty line.

=== 2010 census ===
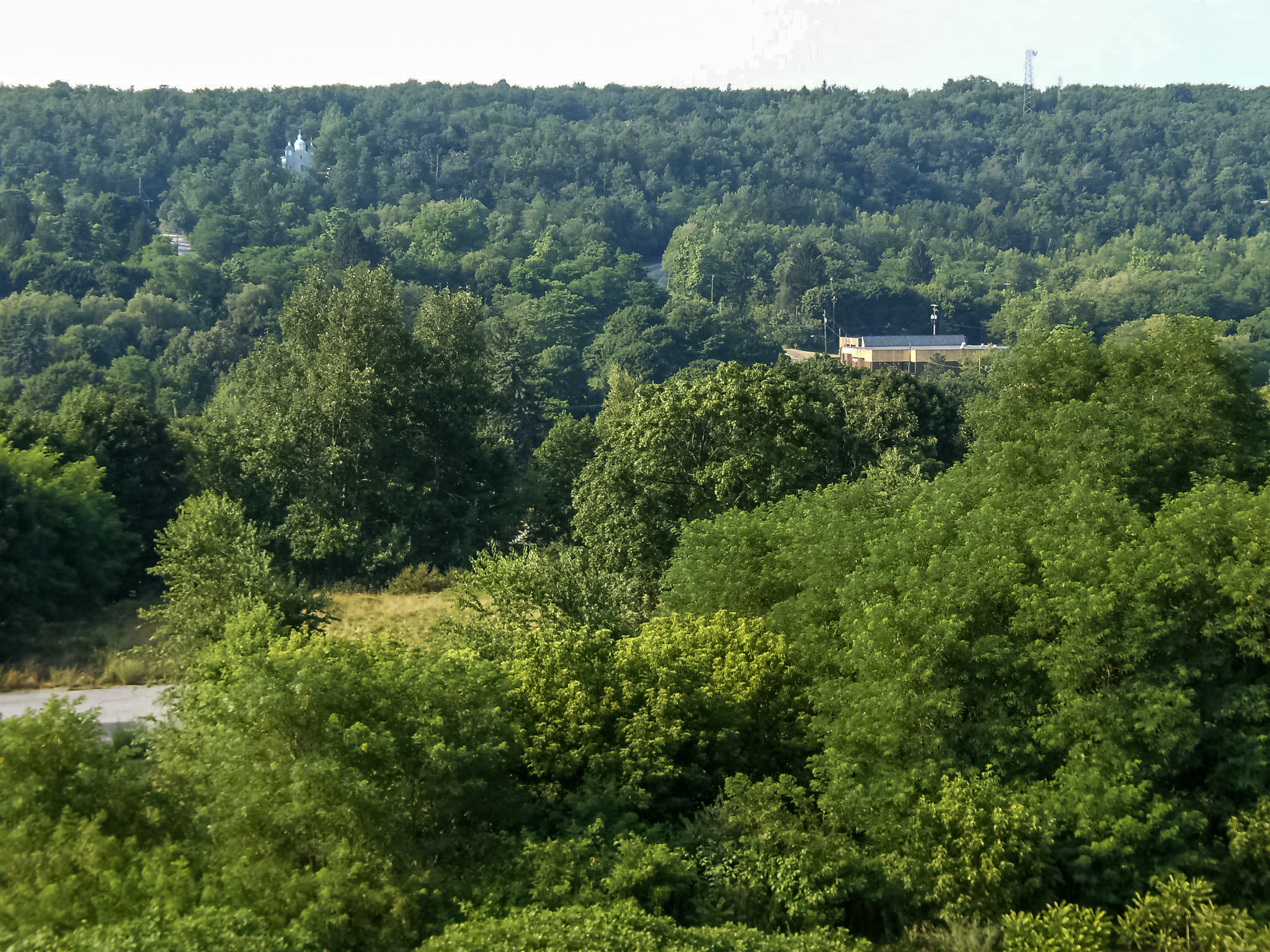
Centralia in 2010

As of the census of 2010, there were 10 people (down 52% since 2000), five households (down 50%), and three families (down 57%) residing in the borough. The population density was 42 inhabitants per square mile (16/km^{2}) (down 52%). There were six housing units (down 62.5%) at an average density of 0.4 units per square mile (.015 units/km^{2}). The racial makeup of the borough was 100% white.

Of the five households, none had children under the age of 18. Two (40%) were married couples living together, one (20%) had a female householder with no spouse present, and two (40%) were non-families. One of those non-family households was an individual, and none had someone living alone who was 65 years of age or older. The average household size was 2.0 persons, and the average family size was 2.33 persons.

There were no residents under the age of 18, one aged 25–29, one aged 50–54, one aged 55–59, four aged 60–64, two aged 70–74, and one aged 80–84. The median age was 62.5 years, and there were five females and five males in total.

=== 2020 census ===
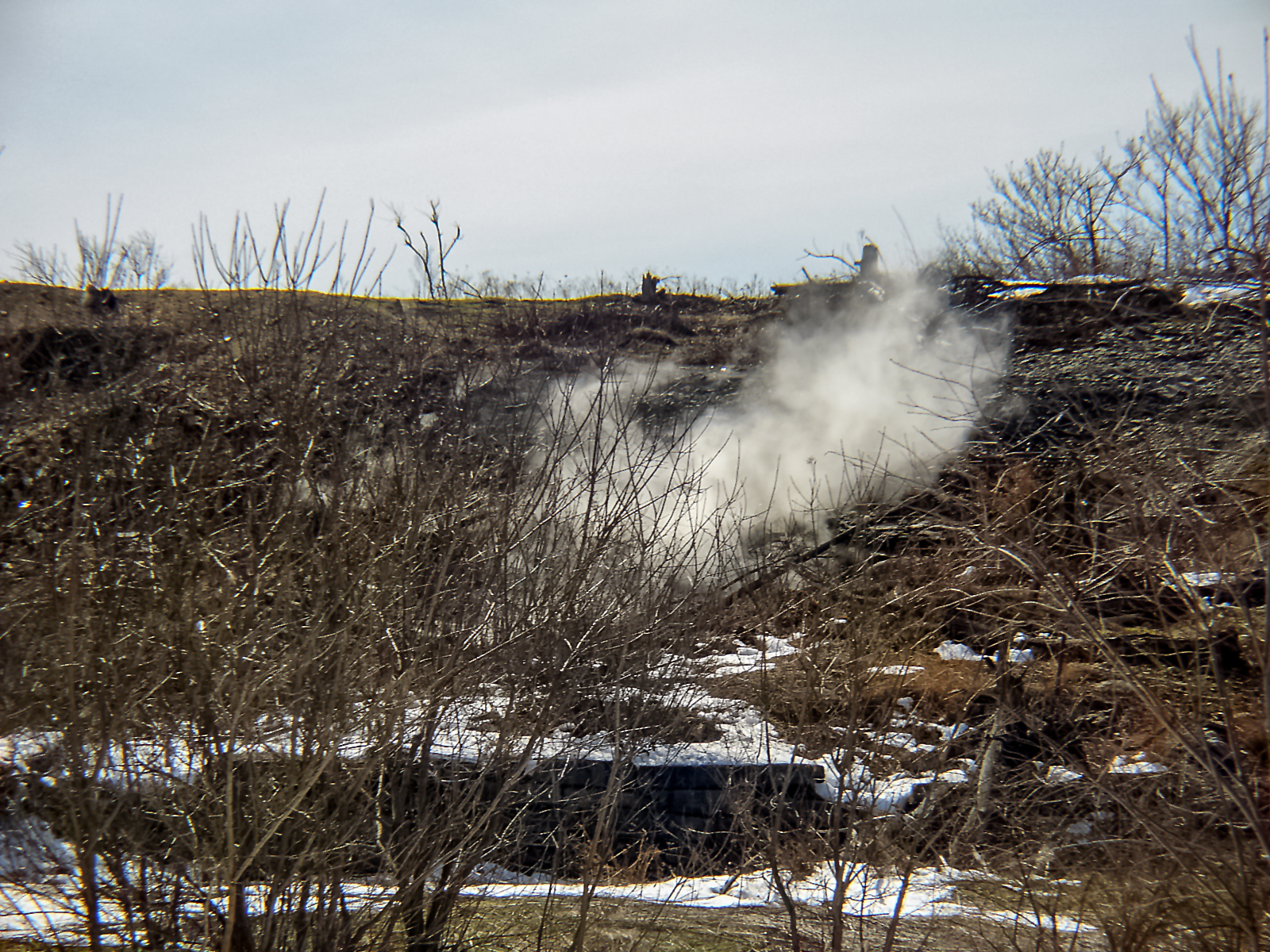
Smoke at Centralia

As of the census of 2020, there were five people residing in the borough with one resident (20%) being under the age of 18.

In 2024, the population was 1. The resident was a white male between the ages of 70 to 74.

== Public services ==
The Centralia Municipal Building still stands, along with its attached fire station garage. By the early 2010s, the building had fallen into disrepair, but new siding was installed in 2012. The building hosts the annual Centralia Cleanup Day, when volunteers collect illegally dumped trash in the area. Although past cleanup days avoided fire-impacted areas, the 2018 cleanup included areas around the landfill and the abandoned section of PA Route 61. Volunteers planted 250 apple trees around Centralia to restore the town's ecosystem and wildlife habitats in April 2021.

The borough council still had regular meetings as of 2011. It was reported that the town's highest bill at the meeting reported on came from PPL Electric Utilities at $92 and the town's budget was "in the black."

== Religion ==
The remaining church in the borough, the town's Ukrainian Catholic church, the Assumption of the Blessed Virgin Mary, remains in use. It holds weekly services on Sundays and attracts worshippers from surrounding towns including people who were once residents of the town. It has not yet been directly affected by the fire. A geological survey found there was solid rock, not coal, under the church so it is not in danger of collapse due to the fire.

The town's four cemeteries—including one on the hilltop which has smoke rising around and out of it—are maintained in good condition. Saint Mary's Orthodox Cemetery still stands on the northern edge of Centralia, and Saints Peter & Paul Church and Cemetery, Saint Ignatius Cemetery, and the Odd Fellows Cemetery still stand on the southern edge of the town.

== Education ==
The school district is the Mount Carmel Area School District.

== In popular culture ==
Centralia has been used as a model for many different fictional ghost towns and manifestations of Hell. Prominent examples include Dean Koontz's Strange Highways and David Wellington's Vampire Zero.

Screenwriter Roger Avary researched Centralia while working on the screenplay for the Silent Hill film adaptation. While the movie took inspiration from Centralia, the original game series was not inspired by any particular town.

The song "Perpetual Flame of Centralia" by Kristin Hayter (whilst under the stage name Lingua Ignota) from her album Sinner Get Ready is named after and inspired by the town.

== See also ==
- Coal seam fires
  - Brennender Berg (Saarland, Germany)
  - Burning Mountain (New South Wales, Australia)
  - Darvaza gas crater (Derweze, Turkmenistan)
  - Jharia (India)
  - New Straitsville mine fire
  - Smoking Hills (Northwest Territories, Canada)
- Arkwright Town
- Passive rewilding
- Love Canal, Niagara Falls, New York
- Namie, Fukushima
- Picher, Oklahoma
- Pripyat, Ukraine
- Times Beach, Missouri
- Wittenoom, Western Australia
