= Bokapahari =

Village in Jharkhand, India

Bokapahari is a village in Dhanbad district, Jharkhand State, India. It is located over subsurface coal fires, and residents make a living gathering and selling coal. The Government of India is trying to relocate them elsewhere, but most of the residents have refused to move, saying they would be unable to make a living elsewhere.
