= Assumption of the Blessed Virgin Mary Ukrainian Catholic Church (Centralia) =

Ukrainian Catholic church in PA

Coordinates: 40.808846°N 76.342425°W

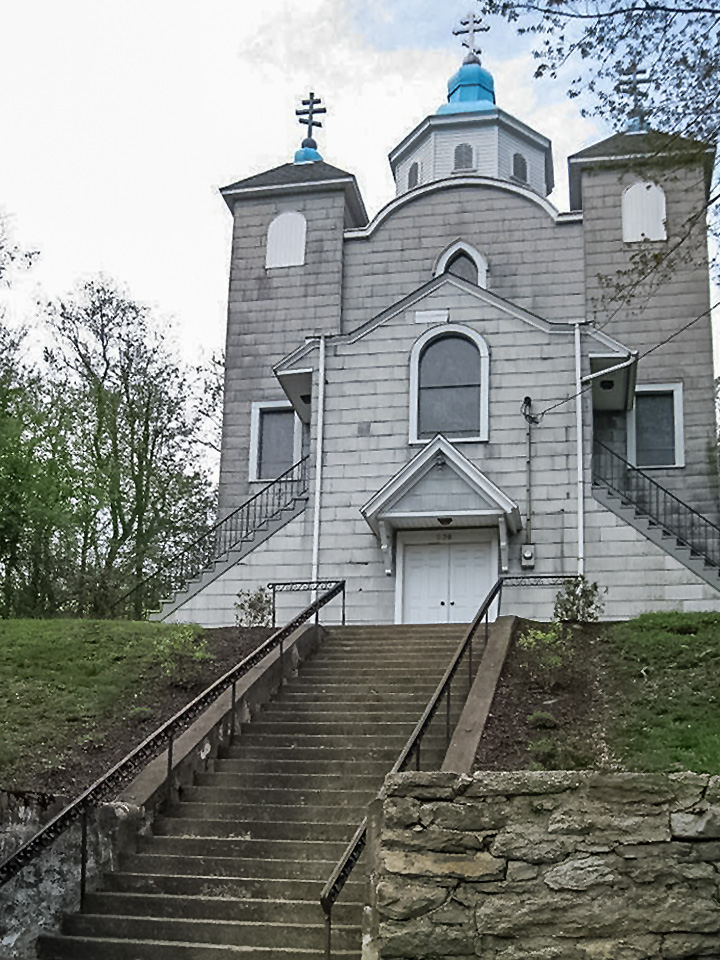
The church in 2013

The Assumption of the Blessed Virgin Mary Ukrainian Catholic Church is a Ukrainian Catholic (Greek Catholic) church in the town of Centralia, Pennsylvania. The church is the last remaining church in Centralia, which was largely abandoned after a mine fire rendered much of the town unsafe.

== History ==
The church was built in 1911, at which time Centralia was a thriving coal mining community. Many of the miners and miners' families who formed the congregation of the church were immigrants from Eastern Europe. In May 1962 a mine fire broke out in the coal seams under Centralia, an event which resulted in the majority of the town's population leaving over the following decades. Despite the continuously burning fires (which are expected to burn for hundreds of years), the Assumption of the Blessed Virgin Mary Ukrainian Catholic Church remained open. In 1987 a survey under the church found that the structure was built on top of rock rather than coal, and so plans to demolish the church were abandoned. The congregation's persistence gained notoriety for the church, which had become an unofficial pilgrimage site for Ukrainian Catholics. In 2015, Major Archbishop Sviatoslav Shevchuk officially declared the church a pilgrimage site.
