= Coal-seam fire =

Underground smouldering of a coal deposit

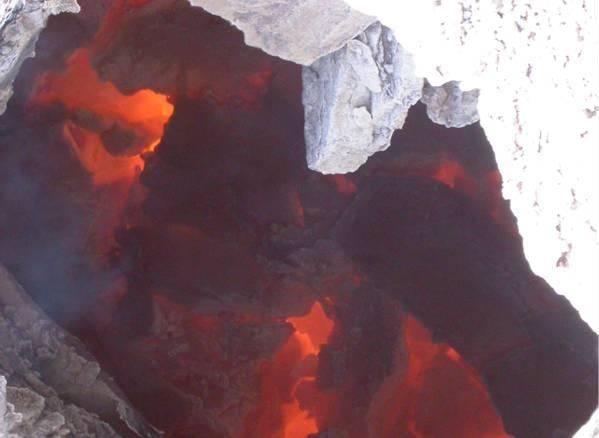
A coal fire in China

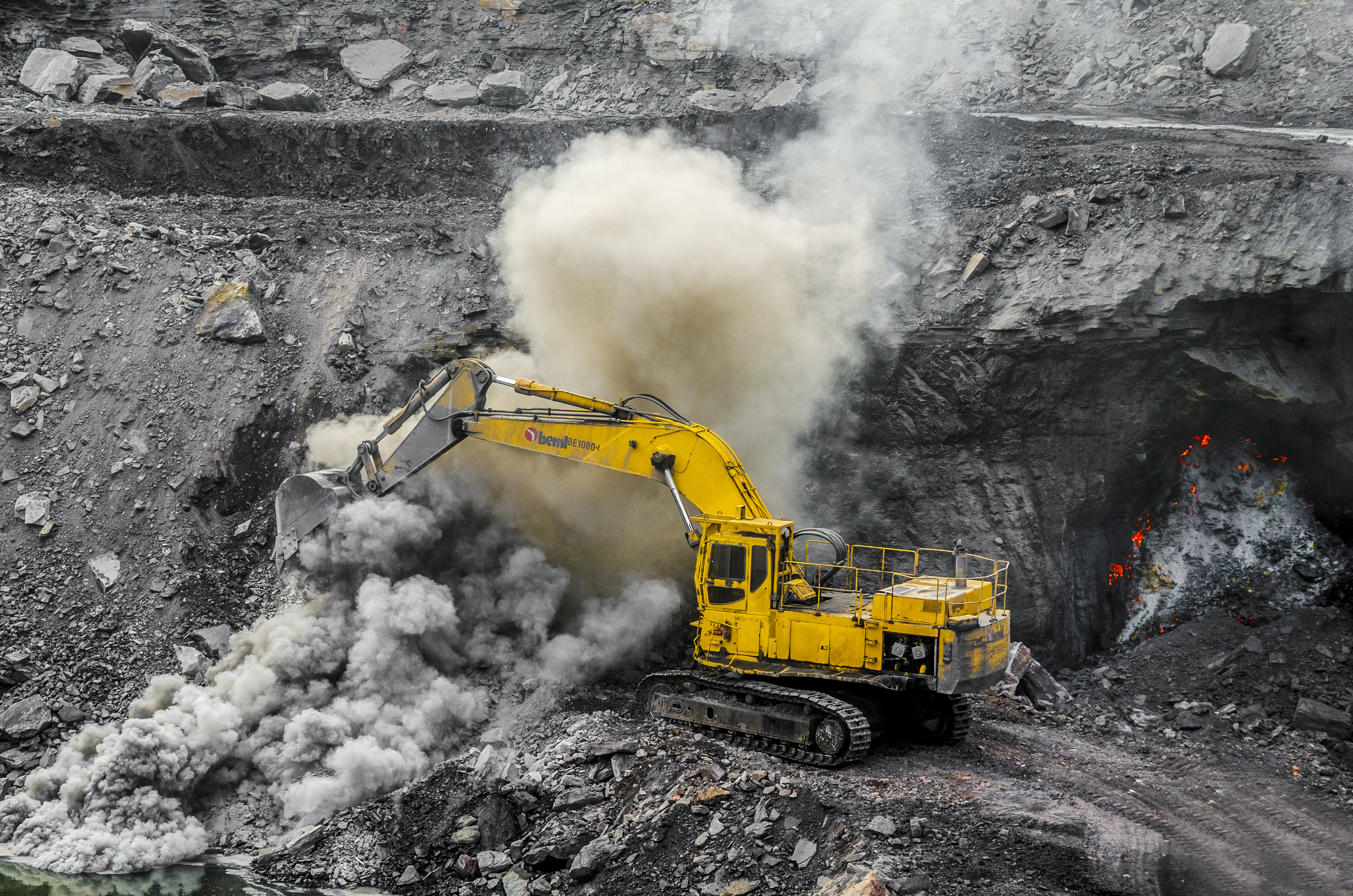
Open-cast mining continues near a fire at Jharia coalfield in India.

A coal-seam fire is a burning of an outcrop or underground coal seam. Most coal-seam fires exhibit smoldering combustion, particularly underground coal-seam fires, because of limited atmospheric oxygen availability. Coal-seam fire instances on Earth date back several million years. Due to thermal insulation and the avoidance of rain/snow extinguishment by the crust, underground coal-seam fires are the most persistent fires on Earth and can burn for thousands of years, like Burning Mountain in Australia. Coal-seam fires can be ignited by self-heating of low-temperature oxidation, lightning, wildfires and even arson. Coal-seam fires have been slowly shaping the lithosphere and changing atmosphere, but this pace has become faster and more extensive in modern times, triggered by mining.

Coal fires are a serious health and safety hazard, affecting the environment by releasing toxic fumes; reigniting grass, brush, or forest fires; and causing subsidence of surface infrastructure such as roads, railways, pipelines, electric lines, bridge supports, buildings, and homes. Whether started by humans or by natural causes, coal-seam fires continue to burn for decades, centuries, or even millennia, until one of the following occurs: either the fuel source is exhausted, a permanent groundwater table is encountered, the depth of the burn becomes greater than the ground's capacity to subside and vent, or humans intervene. Because they burn underground, coal-seam fires are extremely difficult and costly to extinguish, and are unlikely to be suppressed by rainfall. There are strong similarities between coal fires and peat fires.

Across the world, thousands of underground coal fires are burning. The problem is most acute in industrializing, coal-rich nations such as China. Global coal fire emissions are estimated to cause 40 tons of mercury to enter the atmosphere annually, and to represent three percent of the world's annual CO_{2} emissions.

== Origins ==
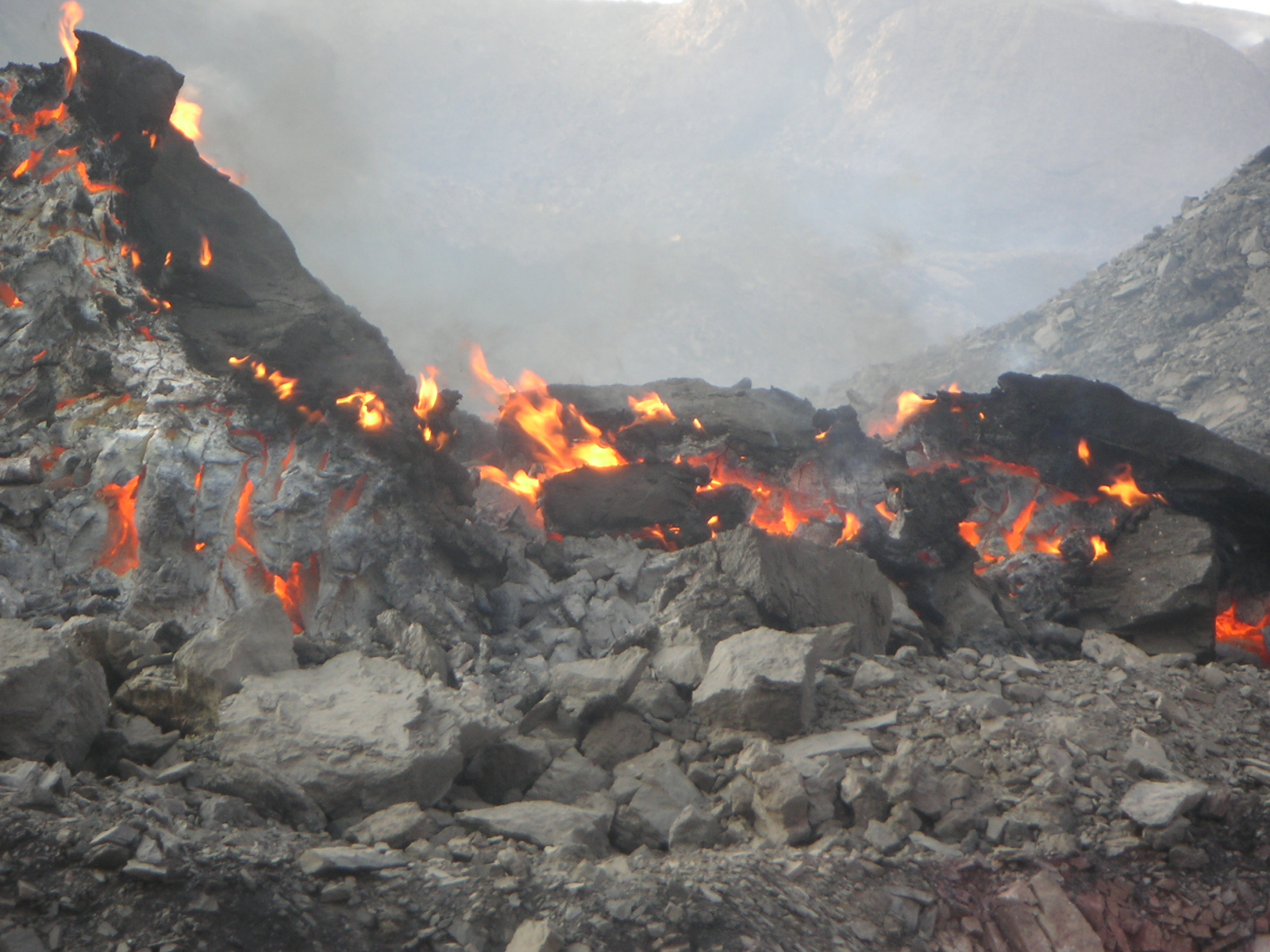
Fire at the surface, Xinjiang, 2002

Coal-seam fires can be divided into near-surface fires, in which seams extend to the surface and the oxygen required for their ignition comes from the atmosphere, and fires in deep underground mines, where the oxygen comes from ventilation.

Mine fires may begin as a result of an industrial accident, generally involving a gas explosion. Historically, some mine fires were started when bootleg mining was stopped by authorities, usually by blowing the mine up. Many recent mine fires have started from people burning trash in a landfill that was in proximity to abandoned coal mines, including the much-publicized Centralia, Pennsylvania, fire, which has been burning since 1962. Of the hundreds of mine fires in the United States burning today, most are found in the state of Pennsylvania.

Some fires along coal seams are natural occurrences. Some coals may self-ignite at temperatures as low as 40 °C (104 °F) for brown coal in the right conditions of moisture and grain size. The fire usually begins a foot or two inside the coal at a depth in which the permeability of the coal allows the inflow of air but in which the ventilation does not remove the heat which is generated. Self-ignition was a recognised problem in steamship times. One well known source of fires is mining breaking into a high pressure cavity of methane gas which on release can generate a spark of static electricity to ignite the gas and start a coal explosion and fire.

Two basic factors determine whether spontaneous combustion occurs or not, the ambient temperature and the grain size:

- The higher the ambient temperature, the more quickly the oxidation reactions proceed.
- The grain size and structure determine its surface area. Kinetics will be limited by availability of reactant, which in this case is carbon exposed to oxygen.

Wildfires (lightning-caused or others) can ignite the coal close to the surface or the entrance of a mine, and the smouldering fire can spread through the seam, creating subsidence that may open further seams to oxygen and spawn future wildfires when the fire breaks to the surface. Prehistoric clinker outcrops in the American West are the result of prehistoric coal fires that left a residue that resists erosion better than the matrix, leaving buttes and mesa. It is estimated that Australia's Burning Mountain, the oldest known coal fire, has burned for 6,000 years.

Rural Chinese in coal-bearing regions often dig coal for household use, abandoning the pits when they become too deep, leaving highly combustible coal dust exposed to the air. Using satellite imagery to map China's coal fires resulted in the discovery of many previously unknown fires. The oldest coal fire in China is in Baijigou (白芨沟, in Dawukou District of Shizuishan, Ningxia) and is said to have been burning since the Qing Dynasty (before 1912).

== Detection ==
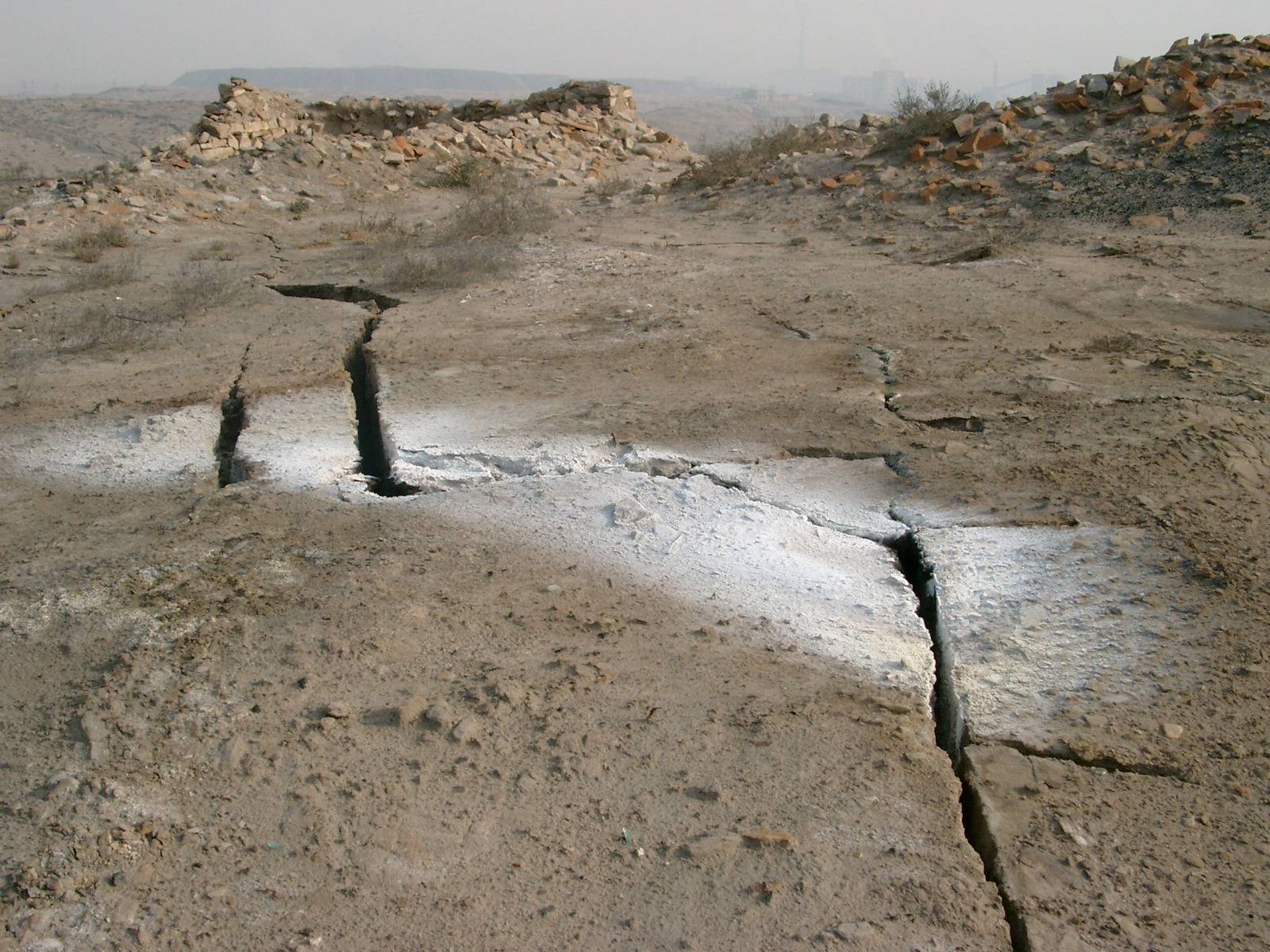
The effect of underground coal fire visible on the surface

Before attempting to extinguish a near-surface coal-seam fire, its location and underground extent should be determined as precisely as possible. Besides studying the geographic, geologic and infrastructural context, information can be gained from direct measurements. These include:

- Temperature measurements of the land surface, in fissures and boreholes, for example using pyrometers
- Gas measurements to characterize the fire ventilation system (amount and velocity) and the gas composition, so that the combustion reactions can be described
- Geophysical measurements on the ground and from aircraft to establish the extent of conductivity or other underground parameters. For example, conductivity measurements map humidity changes near the fire; measuring magnetism can determine changes in the magnetic characteristics of the adjacent rock caused by heat
- Remote sensing from aircraft and satellites. High resolution optical mapping, thermal imaging and hyperspectral data play a role. Underground coal fires of several hundred to over a thousand degrees Celsius may raise the surface temperature by only a few degrees. This order of magnitude is similar to the temperature difference between the sunlit and shadowed slopes of a slag heap or sand dune. Infrared detecting equipment is able to track the fire's location as the fire heats the ground on all sides of it. However, remote sensing techniques are unable to distinguish individual fires burning near one another and often lead to undercounting of actual fires. They may also have some difficulties distinguishing coal-seam fires from forest fires. Combining in-situ data with remote sensing data does allow for monitoring of coal fire intensity over longer periods using time-series analyses.

Underground coal mines can be equipped with permanently installed sensor systems. These relay pressure, temperature, airflow and gas composition measurements to the safety monitoring personnel, giving them early warning of any problems.

== Environmental impact ==
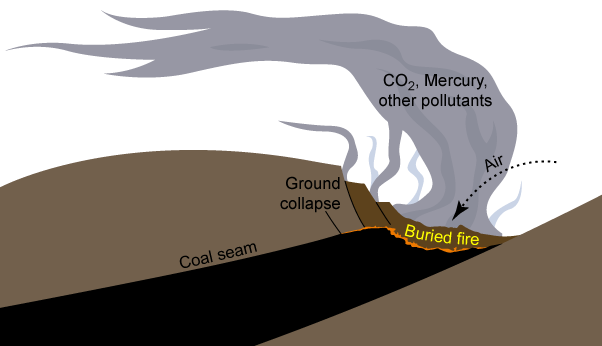
Coal-seam fire

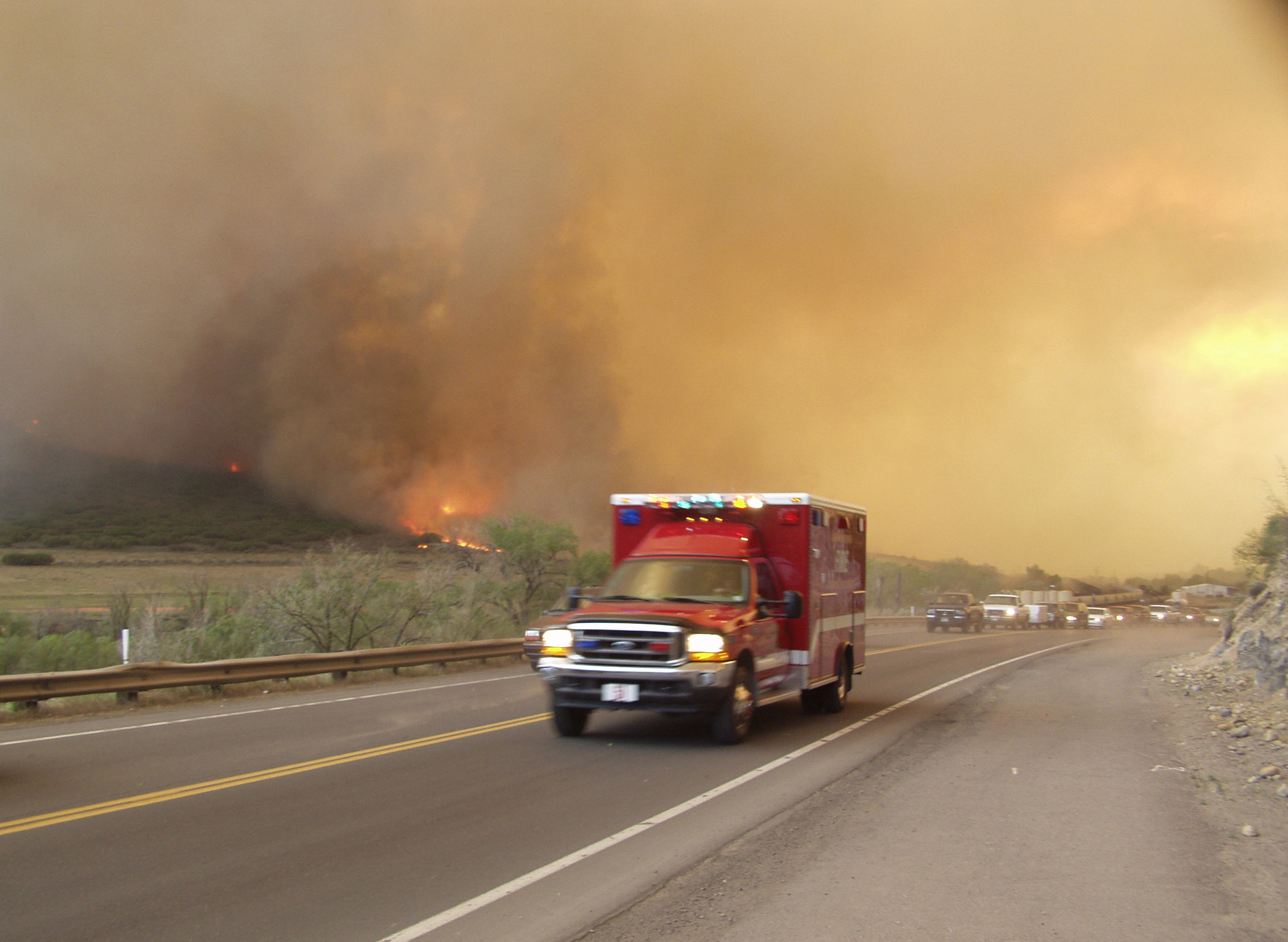
Residents evacuate West Glenwood, Glenwood Springs, Colorado, 2002

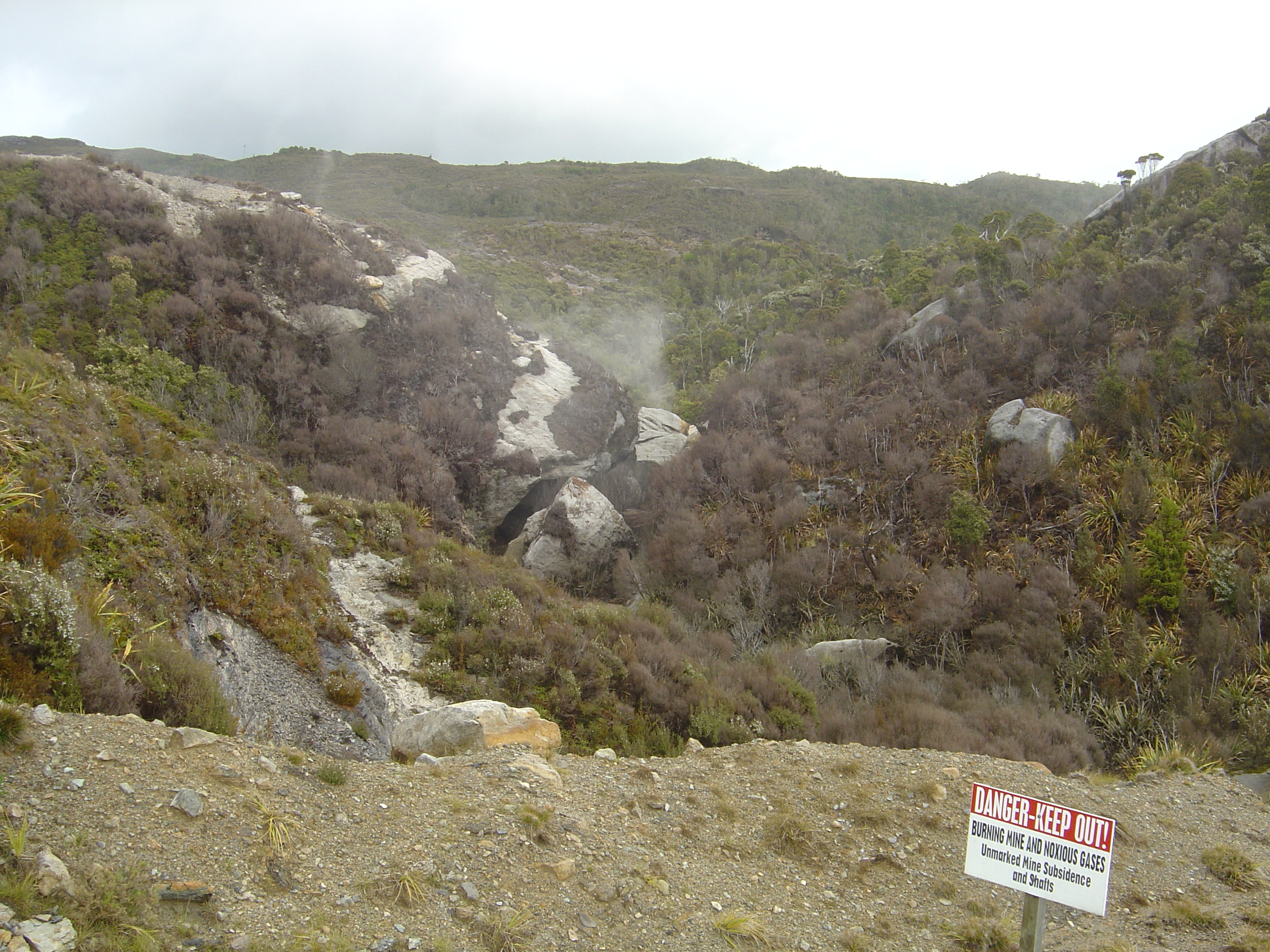
A coal-seam fire near Denniston, New Zealand

Besides destruction of the affected areas, coal fires often emit toxic gases, including carbon monoxide and sulphur dioxide. China's coal fires, which consume an estimated 20 – 200 million tons of coal a year, emit 6 to 43 million tonnes of greenhouse gas each year.

One of the most visible changes will be subsidence. Another local environmental effect can include the presence of plants or animals that are aided by the coal fire. The prevalence of non-native plants can depend upon the fire's duration and the size of the affected area. For example, near a coal fire in Germany, many Mediterranean insects and spiders were identified in a region with cold winters, and it is believed that elevated ground temperatures above the fires permitted their survival.

== Extinguishing coal fires ==
In order to thrive, a fire requires fuel, oxygen, and heat. As underground fires are very difficult to reach directly, fire fighting involves finding an appropriate methodology which addresses the interaction of fuel and oxygen for the specific fire in question. A fire can be isolated from its fuel source, for example through firebreaks or fireproof barriers. Many fires, particularly those on steep slopes, can be completely excavated. In the case of near-surface coal-seam fires, the influx of oxygen in the air can be interrupted by covering the area or installing gas-tight barriers. Another possibility is to hinder the outflow of combustion gases so that the fire is quenched by its own exhaust fumes. Energy can be removed by cooling, usually by injecting large amounts of water. However, if any remaining dry coal absorbs water, the resulting heat of absorption can lead to re-ignition of a once-quenched fire as the area dries. Accordingly, more energy must be removed than the fire generates. In practice these methods are combined, and each case depends on the resources available. This is especially true for water, for example in arid regions, and for covering material, such as loess or clay, to prevent contact with the atmosphere.

Extinguishing underground coal fires, which sometimes exceed temperatures of 540 °C (1,000 °F), is both highly dangerous and very expensive.

Near-surface coal-seam fires are routinely extinguished in China following a standard method basically consisting of the following phases:

- Smoothing the surface above the fire with heavy equipment to make it fit for traffic.
- Drilling holes in the fire zone about 20 m apart down to the source of the fire, following a regular grid.
- Injecting water or mud in the boreholes long term, usually 1 to 2 years.
- Covering the entire area with an impermeable layer about 1 m thick, e.g., of loess.
- Planting vegetation to the extent the climate allows.

Efforts are underway to refine this method, for example with additives to the quenching water or with alternative extinguishing agents.

Underground coal-seam fires are customarily quenched by inertisation through mine rescue personnel. Toward this end the affected area is isolated by dam constructions in the galleries. Then an inert gas, usually nitrogen, is introduced, usually making use of available pipelines.

In 2004, the Chinese government claimed success in extinguishing a mine fire at a colliery near Urumqi, Xinjiang that had been burning since 1874. However, a March 2008 Time magazine article quotes researcher Steven Q. Andrews as saying, "I decided to go to see how it was extinguished, and flames were visible and the entire thing was still burning. ... They said it was put out, and who is to say otherwise?"

A jet engine unit, known as Górniczy Agregat Gaśniczy (GAG), was developed in Poland and successfully used for fighting coal fires and displacing firedamp in mines.

Putting out the fires can be expensive for local government, so may be funded by central government. Time magazine reported in July 2010 that less expensive alternatives for extinguishing coal-seam fires were beginning to reach the market, including heat-resistant grouts and a fire-smothering nitrogen foam, with other innovative solutions on the way.

== List of mine fires ==
Some of the more notable mine fires around the world are listed below.

=== Australia ===
- Burning Mountain – a naturally occurring, slow-combusting underground coal seam, it has been burning for over 5500 years.
- Hill End Colliery fire – a coal-seam fire at Cessnock, New South Wales, that burned from, at latest, August 1930 to probably as late as June 1949.
- Blair Athol coal mine – a mine, near Clermont, Queensland, that has been the site of a number of fires, one of which burned underground for 54 years.
- Charbon - a coal-seam fire on the outskirts of Charbon, which has been burning underground for 50+ years.
- Morwell, Victoria – the Great Morwell open cut mine caught fire in March 1902 and burned for over a month. It was extinguished by breaching the nearby Morwell River with explosives to flood the mine. The fire was found to have been caused by sabotage from incendiary devices.
- Hazelwood Power Station – a 2 km coal face in the Hazelwood open cut mine was set alight by a bushfire in October 2006 and again in February 2014. Thousands of residents were affected by the fire at the Hazelwood coal mine in 2014 which burned for 45 days sending smoke across the community of Morwell in Victoria. Government advised the vulnerable groups of people in South Morwell to relocate temporarily due to the danger of PM2.5 particulate matter. In May 2020 the Hazelwood Power Corporation was fined $1.56 million for occupational health and safety breaches associated with the fire.

=== Canada ===
- Elkford, British Columbia
- Merritt, British Columbia
- Carmacks, Yukon
- Smoking Hills, Northwest Territories

=== China ===
In China, the world's largest coal producer with an annual output around 2.5 billion tons, coal fires are a serious problem. It has been estimated that some 10–200 million tons of coal uselessly burn annually, and that the same amount again is made inaccessible to mining. Coal fires extend over a belt across the entire north China, whereby over one hundred major fire areas are listed, each of which contains many individual fire zones. They are concentrated in the provinces of Xinjiang, Inner Mongolia and Ningxia. China restricts dissemination of information on its coal fires, and reports of extinguishing successes are unreliable. Beside losses from burned and inaccessible coal, these fires contribute to air pollution and considerably increased levels of greenhouse gas emissions and have thereby become a problem which has gained international attention.

=== France ===
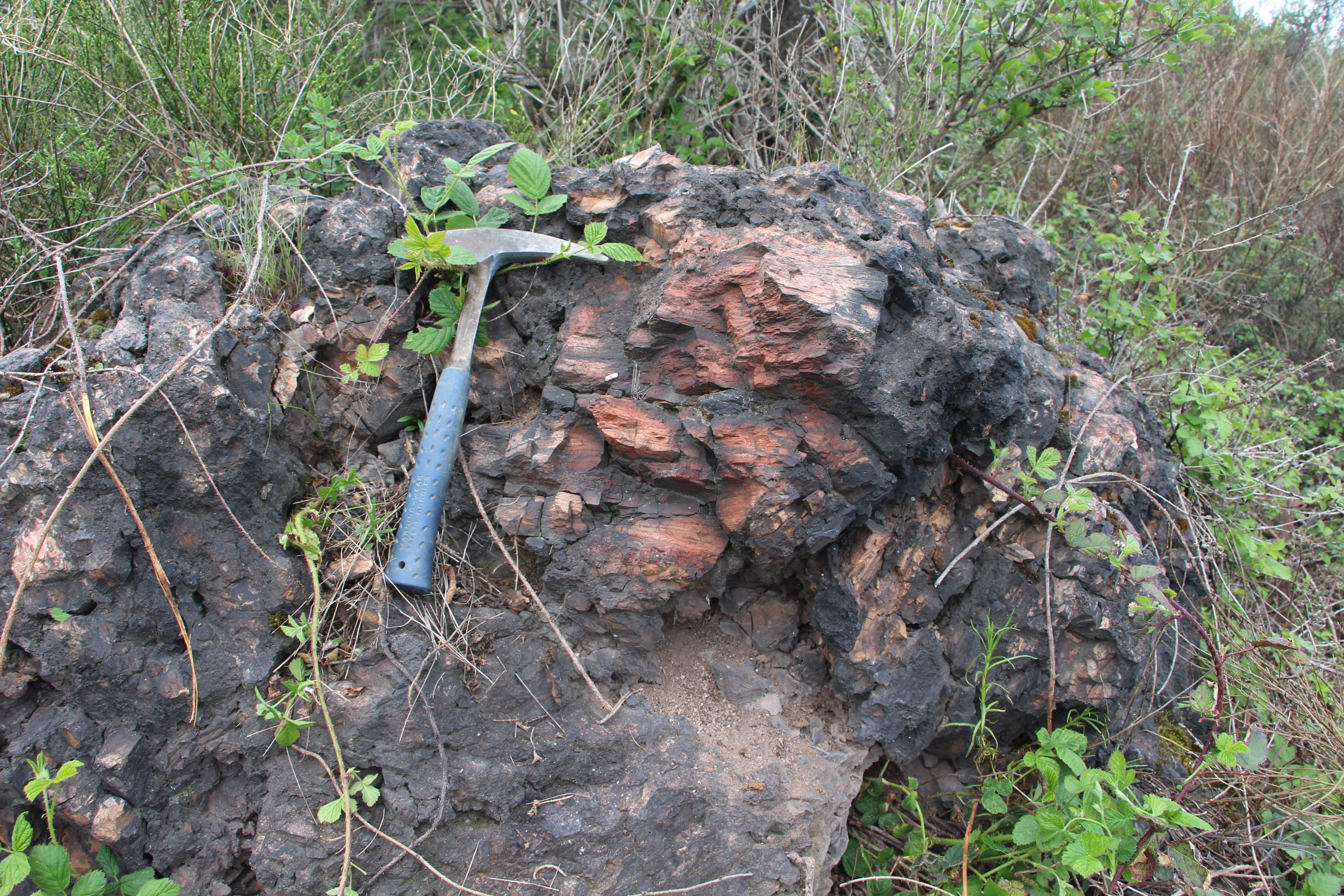
Outcrops of pyrometamorphic rocks (porcelanites) from 17th century's coal seam fires at Mont Salson, Saint-Etienne, France

In Saint-Etienne coal basin, five burning hills (montagnes de feu) have been described from the early 17th Century to the early 19th century around the city of Saint-Etienne. Some of these fires were reported burning for 3 centuries. Most of them were extinguished in 1785 These old burning hills correspond today to the Mont Salson, Bois d'Avaize and Cote Chaude in Saint-Etienne, la colline du Brûlé in la Ricamarie and Le mont du Feu (Mount of fire) in Genilac. The fire in Genilac lasted 30 years from 1740. Outcrops of pyrometamorphic rocks generated by these fires are visible today on Mont Salson and bois d'Avaize.

=== Germany ===
In Planitz, now a part of the city of Zwickau, a coal seam that had been burning since 1476 was only quenched in 1860. In Dudweiler, Saarland, a coal-seam fire ignited around 1668 and is still burning. This so-called Burning Mountain ("Brennender Berg") soon became a tourist attraction and was even visited by Johann Wolfgang von Goethe. Also well-known is the so-called Stinksteinwand (stinking stone wall) in Schwalbenthal on the eastern slope of the Hoher Meißner, where several seams caught fire centuries ago after lignite coal mining ceased; combustion gas continues to reach the surface.

=== India ===
In India, as of 2010, 68 fires were burning beneath a 58-square-mile (150 km^{2}) region of the Jharia coalfield in Dhanbad, Jharkhand. Mine fires started in this region in 1916 and are rapidly destroying the only source of prime coking coal in the country as well as the surrounding areas due to land subsidence and pollution.

=== Indonesia ===
Coal and peat fires in Indonesia are often ignited by forest fires near deposits at the surface. It is difficult to determine when a forest fire is started by a coal-seam fire, or vice versa. The most common cause of forest fires and haze in Indonesia is intentional burning of forest to clear land for plantation crops of pulp wood, rubber and palm oil.

No accurate count of coal-seam fires has been completed in Indonesia. Only a minuscule fraction of the country has been surveyed for coal fires. The best data available come from a study based on systematic, on-the-ground observation. In 1998, a total of 125 coal fires were located and mapped within a 2-kilometre strip either side of a 100-kilometre stretch of road north of Balikpapan to Samarinda in East Kalimantan, using hand-held Global Positioning System (GPS) equipment. Extrapolating this data to areas on Borneo and Sumatra underlain by known coal deposits, it was estimated that more than 250,000 coal-seam fires may have been burning in Indonesia in 1998.

Land clearing practices which use fire, often starting forest fires, may be the cause of coal-seam fires in Indonesia. In 1982 and 1983 one of the largest forest fires in this century raged for several months through an estimated 5 million hectares of Borneo's tropical rainforests. Goldammer and Seibert however concluded that there are indications that coal-seam fires already occurred between 13,200 and 15,000 BP.

A fire season usually occurs every 3 to 5 years, when the climate in parts of Indonesia becomes exceptionally dry from June to November due to the El Niño–Southern Oscillation off the west coast of South America. Since 1982, fire has been a recurring feature on the islands of Borneo and Sumatra, burning large areas in 1987, 1991, 1994, 1997–1998, 2001 and 2004.

In October 2004 smoke from land clearing again covered substantial portions of Borneo and Sumatra, disrupting air travel, increasing hospital admissions, and extending to portions of Brunei, Singapore and Malaysia. Coal outcrops are so common in Indonesia it is virtually certain these fires ignited new coal-seam fires.

=== New Zealand ===
- Burnett's Face, West Coast
- Strongman Mine, West Coast
- Wangaloa, Otago
- Pike River Mine, West Coast
- Millerton area, Stockton Mine, West Coast, South Island, New Zealand

=== Norway ===
In 1944, Longyearbyen Mine #2 on Svalbard was set alight by sailors from the German battleship Tirpitz on its final sortie outside of Norwegian coastal waters. The mine continued to burn for 20 years, while some of the areas were subsequently mined from the reconstructed Mine #2b.

=== Poland ===
- Mining disaster at Donnersmarckhütte mine

=== South Africa ===
- Transvaal and Delagoa Bay Collieries near Emalahleni (formerly known as Witbank), Mpumalanga has been burning since the mine was abandoned in 1953.

=== United States ===
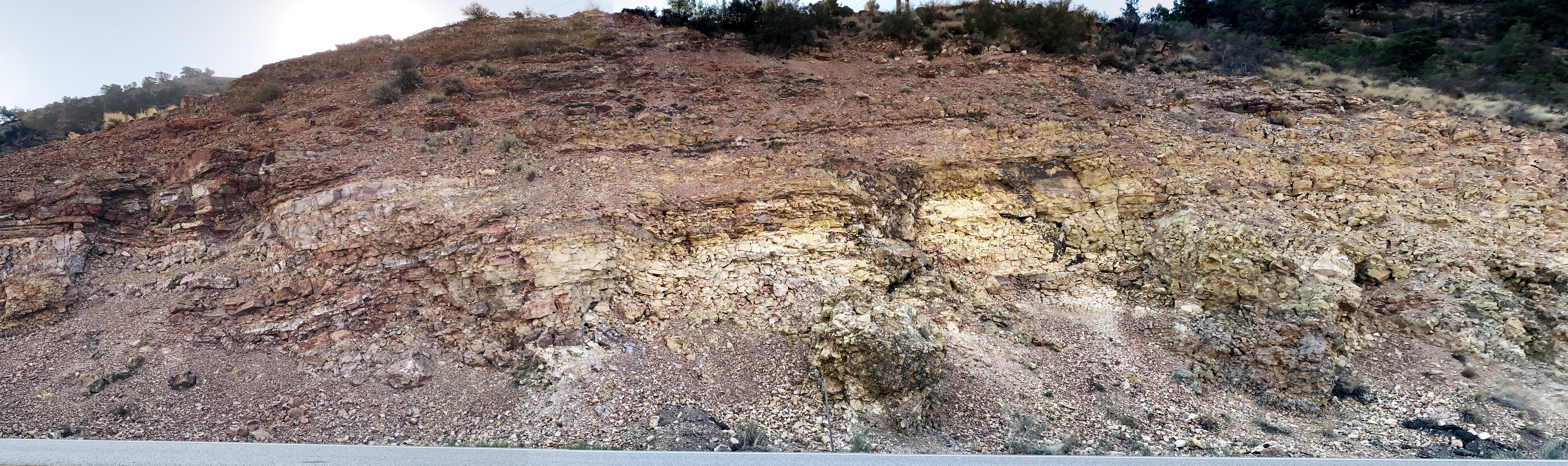
Clinker exposed by a cutting for a road through Willow Creek Canyon, Carbon County, Utah

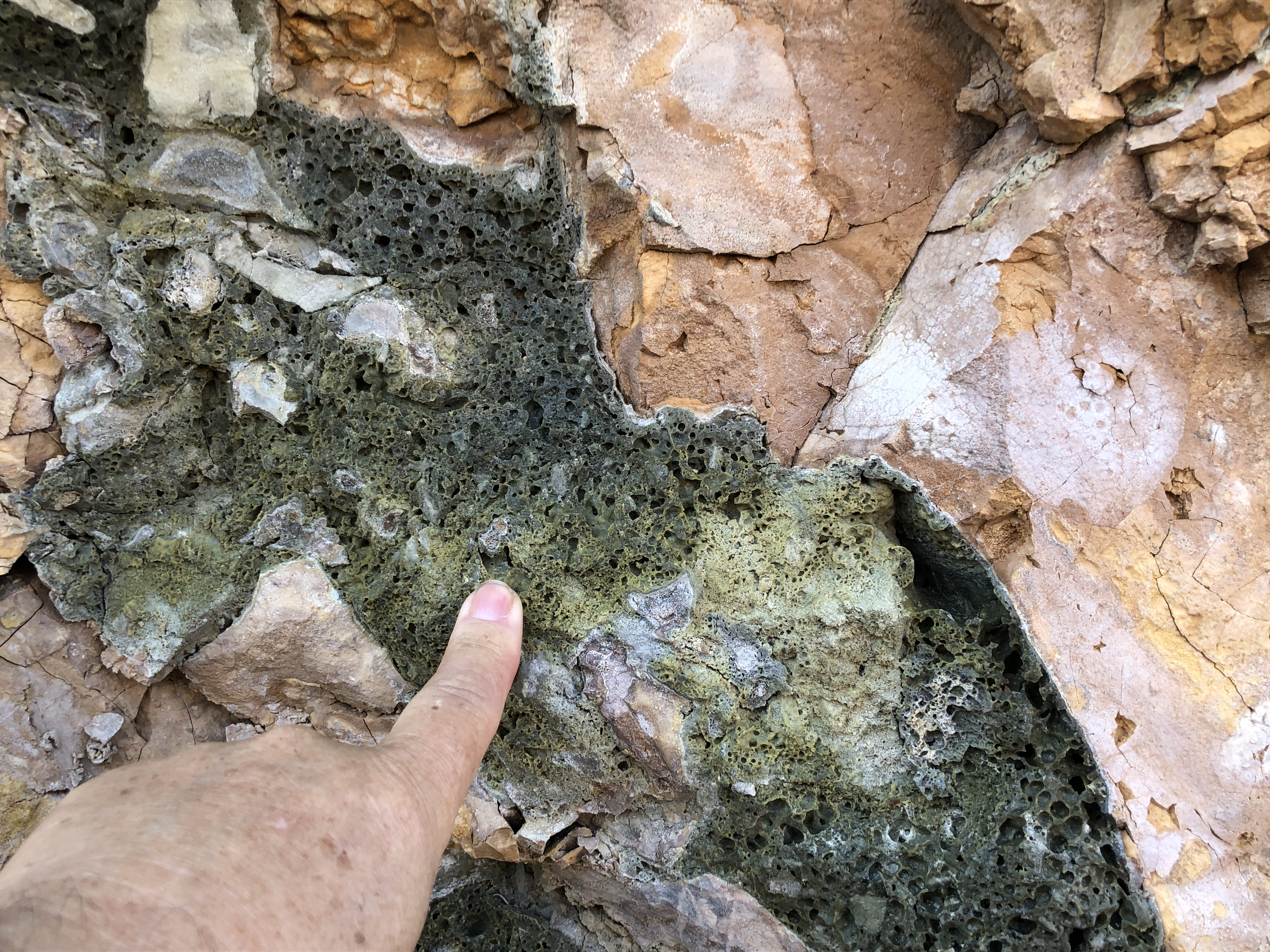
Close up showing fused rock in a clinker

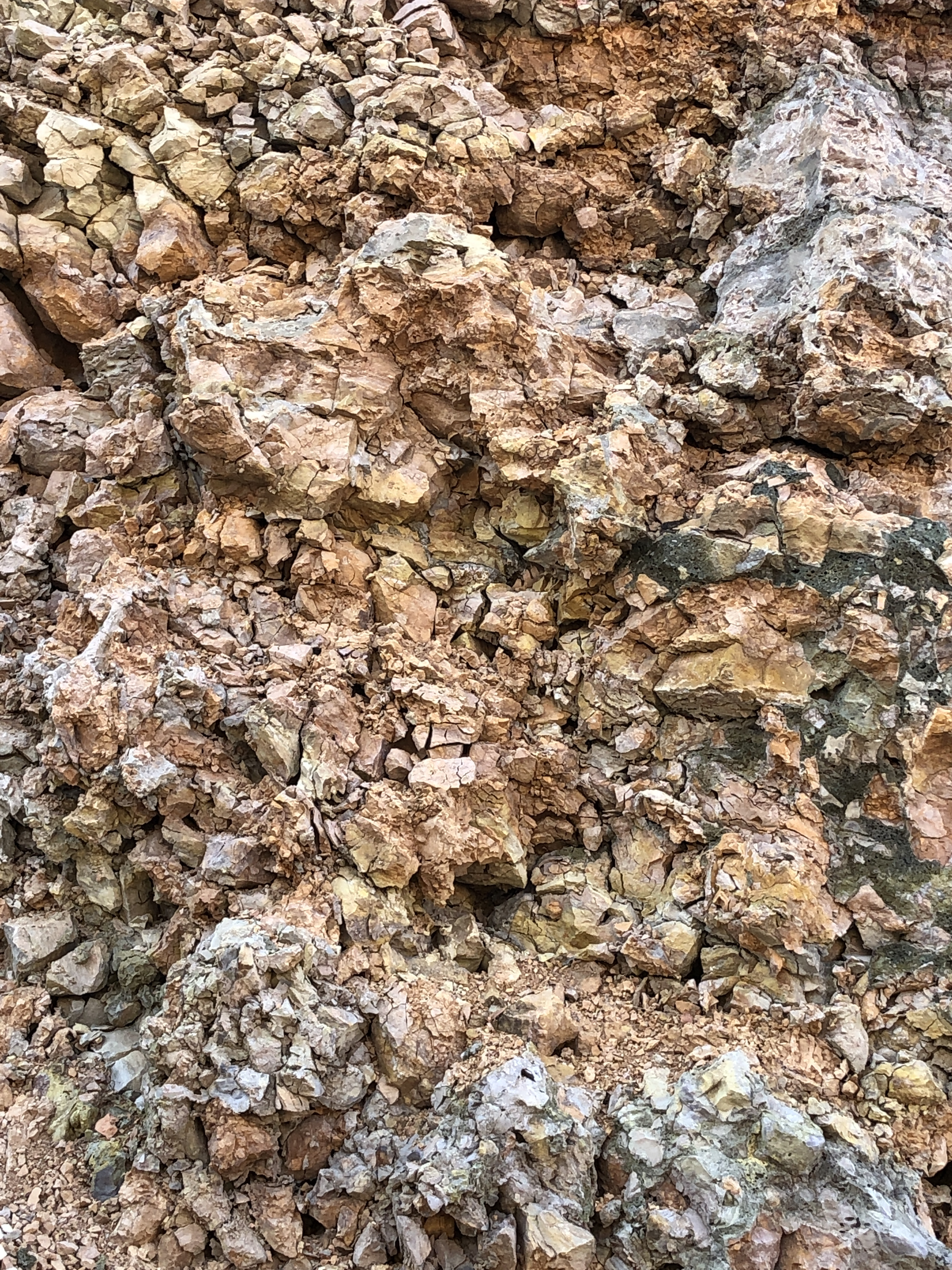
Wall of clinker in a roadcut

Many coalfields in the US are subject to spontaneous ignition. The federal Office of Surface Mining (OSM) maintains a database (AMLIS), which in 1999 listed 150 fire zones. In mid-2010, according to OSM, more than 100 fires were burning beneath nine states, most of them in Colorado, Kentucky, Pennsylvania, Utah and West Virginia. Some geologists say that many fires go unreported, so that the actual number of them may be nearer to 200, across 21 states.

In Pennsylvania, 45 fire zones are known, the most famous being the Centralia mine fire in the Centralia mine in the hard coal region of Columbia County, which has been burning since 1962. Burning Mine, near Summit Hill, caught fire in 1859.

The Powder River Basin in Wyoming and Montana contains some 800 billion tons of brown coal, and the Lewis and Clark Expedition (1804 to 1806) reported fires there. Fires have been a natural occurrence in this area for about three million years and have shaped the landscape. For example, an area about 4,000 square kilometres in size is covered with coal clinker, some of it in Theodore Roosevelt National Park, where there is a spectacular view of fiery red coal clinker from Scoria Point.

- Laurel Run, Pennsylvania
- New Castle, Colorado
- Glenwood Springs, Colorado
- Lotts Creek, Kentucky
- Ruth Mullins, Kentucky
- Truman Shephard, Kentucky
- New Straitsville, Ohio
- San Toy, Ohio
- Smoky Mountain in Grand Staircase-Escalante National Monument, Utah
- Sego, Utah
- Vanderbilt, Pennsylvania
- Centralia, Pennsylvania
- Carbondale, Pennsylvania
- The coal-seam fire beneath Marshall Mesa in Boulder, Colorado was investigated as a possible cause of the 2021 Marshall Fire.

== In popular culture ==
The novel Germinal by the French novelist Emile Zola describes a fictional coal fire called Le Tartaret.

The 1991 film Nothing but Trouble, directed and co-written by Dan Aykroyd, features a town, Valkenvania, that has an underground coal fire that has been burning for decades. The judge of the town references the constantly burning coal-mine fire as the source of his hatred of financiers.

In the TV show Scorpion, Season 3, Episode 23, the Scorpion team extinguishes an underground coal fire in Wyoming.

The novel Fire in the Earth (地火) by Chinese author Liu Cixin focuses on the theme of underground coal fires, exploring their causes and consequences within a fictional narrative.

In the story The Town on the Edge of Hell, on the podcast Haunted by Impala Films. A coal seam in the small, abandoned, fictional UK mining town of Ravendale had been burning for 40 years. This causes the local petrol station to explode, killing a portion of the town's population.

== See also ==
- The Darvaza gas crater, a burning natural gas deposit in Turkmenistan
- Underground coal gasification
- Oil well fire
- Fumarole mineral
