= Brennender Berg =

Mountain

Coordinates: 49°17′20″N 7°3′13″E

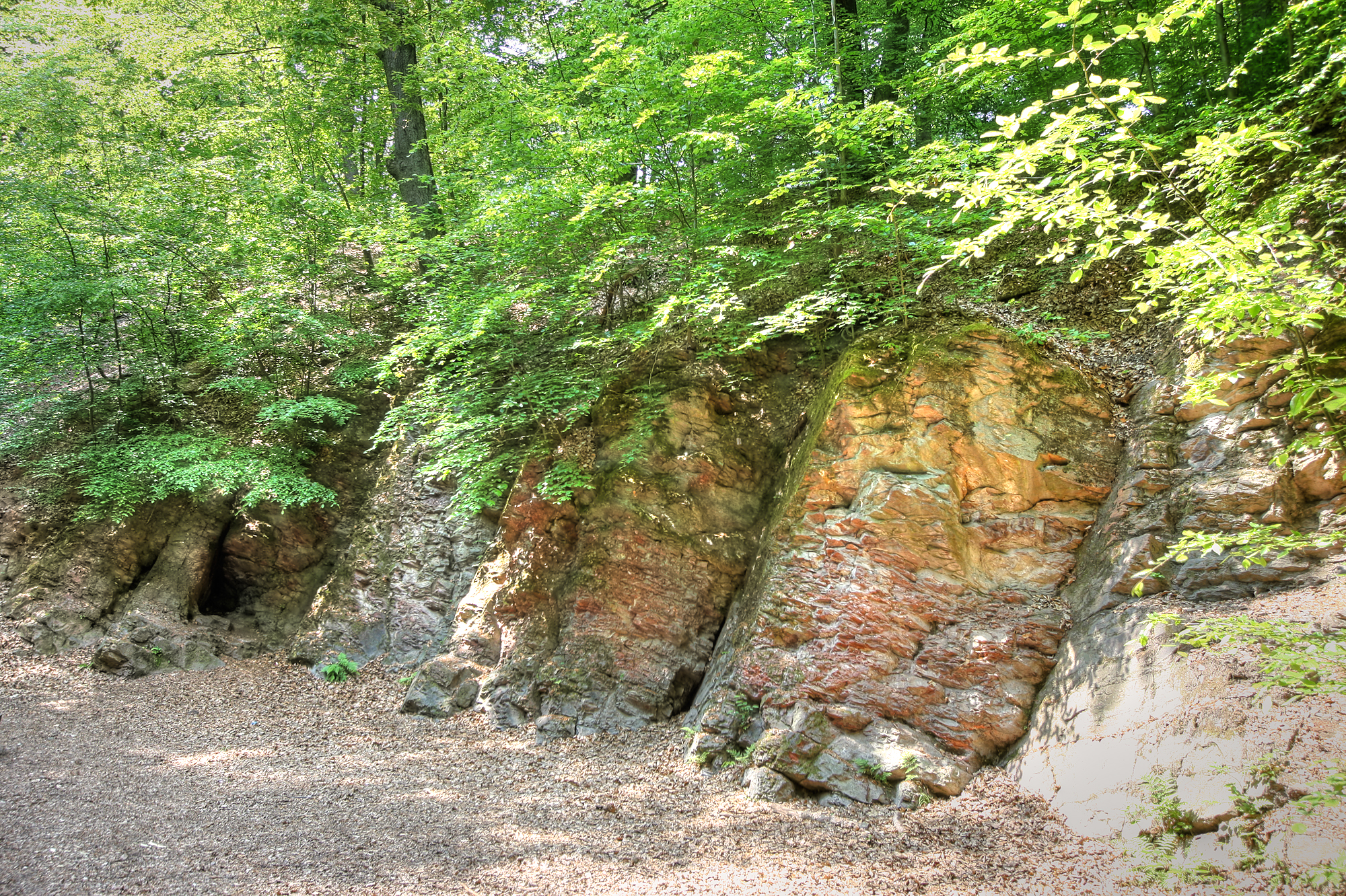
Brennender Berg

The Brennender Berg (Burning Mountain) is a natural monument located in a deep and narrow gorge between Dudweiler and Sulzbach in Saarland, Germany. It is a smouldering coal-seam fire that ignited in 1668 and continues to burn today.

== History ==
The exact cause of the fire is unknown, but it was probably a case of spontaneous combustion caused by pressure and decomposition as a result of unplanned coal mining. According to legend, a shepherd lit a fire at a tree stump, which propagated down through the roots to the coal seam. An unsuccessful attempt was made to fight the fire with water. It does not burn with an open flame but instead glows. Originally this glow could be seen through cracks in the rock and there was a considerable build-up of smoke. The fire began to weaken by the end of the 18th century. Depending on the weather, smoke is visible and in at least one of the rock crevices an outflow of warm air can be detected.

== Tourism ==
The Brennender Berg is one of the region's places of interest. It is a popular destination for excursions and school trips. A convenient starting point is the parking lot of the Dudweiler cemetery at the end of Neuweiler Straße. Johann Wolfgang von Goethe also visited the Brennender Berg in 1770 and a commemorative plaque records the event. He later reminisced about this visit as follows:

We heard about the abundant Dutweiler coal mines, the iron and alum plants, and even about a burning mountain, and made preparations to see this nearby wonder....We entered a gorge and found ourselves in the vicinity of the burning mountain. We were enveloped by a strong sulphur smell; one side of the cave was almost glowing, and covered with reddish, white-roasted rock. Dense steam arose from the crevices and we could feel the hot ground even through the thick soles of our shoes. (Lit.: Goethe)

== See also ==
- Burning Mountain
- Centralia mine fire
- New Straitsville mine fire
- Smoking Hills

== Literature ==
- (in German) Johann Wolfgang von Goethe: Dichtung und Wahrheit. Zweiter Teil. Zehntes Buch. 1812. (Internetfundstelle)
- (in German) Martin Schuto: Neue Wirtschaftszweige – Alaunhütten, Kokserzeugung, Sudhaus. In: 1000 Jahre Dudweiler 977–1977. Saarbrücker Zeitung Verlag. Saarbrücken 1977. S. 228–233.
- (in German) Karl Heinz Ruth: Die Alaungewinnung am Brennenden Berg. In: Historische Beiträge aus der Arbeit der Dudweiler Geschichtswerkstatt. Band 5. Saarbrücken 1988, S. 1–17.
