= Burning Mountain =

Common name for Mount Wingen, a hill near Wingen, New South Wales, Australia

- Mount Wingen
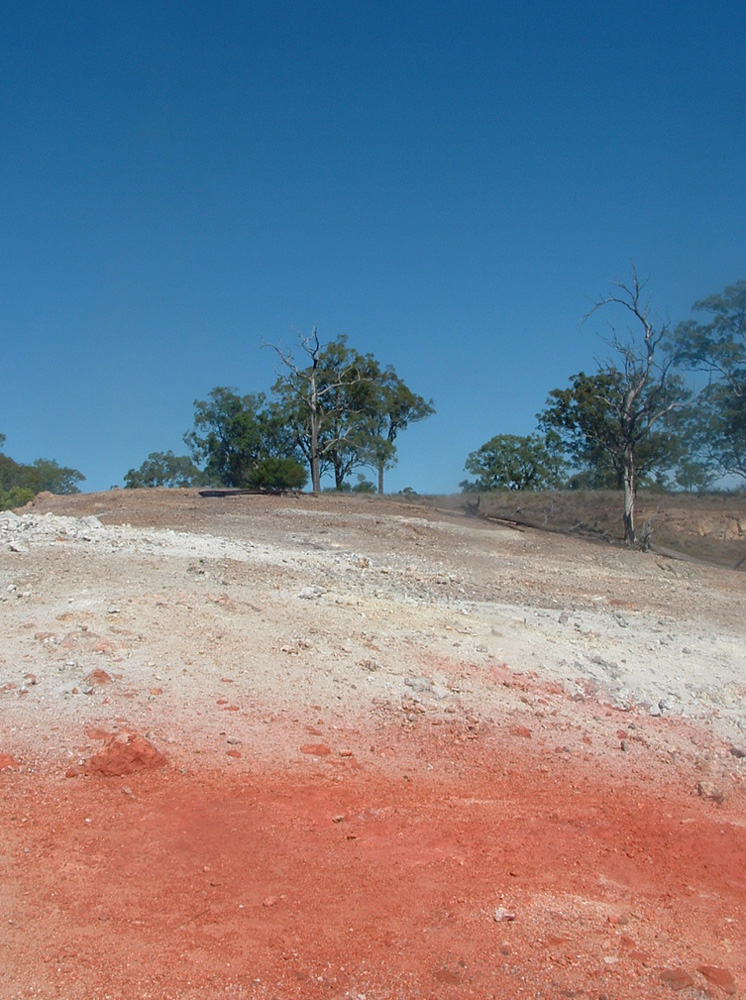
- View of the summit

Highest point
- Elevation: 520 m (1,710 ft)
- Prominence: 120 m (390 ft)
- Coordinates: 31°51′54″S 150°54′04″E

Geography
- Location within New South Wales Location within Australia
- Location: New South Wales, Australia
- Topo map(s): Murrurundi 9034 (1:100000); Murrurundi 90324N (1:25000)

Climbing
- Easiest route: walking track

Burning Mountain, the common name for Mount Wingen, is a hill near Wingen, New South Wales, Australia, approximately 224 km (139 mi) north of Sydney just off the New England Highway. It takes its name from a smouldering coal seam running underground through the sandstone. Burning Mountain is contained within the Burning Mountain Nature Reserve, which is administered by the NSW National Parks and Wildlife Service.

A trail with information panels runs from the parking lots to the site where smoke emanates from the ground.

The Leyland brothers reported on Mount Wingen in the first episode of their travel programme, Ask The Leyland Brothers:

The Aborigines named the mountain Wingen, which means "fire". Their explanation of the origin of the burning mountain was that one day, a tribesman was lighting a fire on the mountainside when he was carried off deep into the earth by The Evil One. Unable to escape, he used his fire stick to set the mountain alight, so that the smoke might warn others to keep away.

== Coal seam fire ==
The underground fire is estimated to be at a depth of around 30 m (100 ft). It is estimated that the fire has burned for approximately 6,000 years and is the oldest known coal fire.

European explorers and settlers to the area believed the smoke, coming from the ground, was volcanic in origin. It was not until 1829 that geologist Reverend C. P. N. Wilton identified it as a coal seam fire.

The fire is generally moving in a southerly direction at a rate of about 1 m (3 ft) per year. The combustion has caused soil discolouration and an uneven ground surface in the area.

== See also ==
- Brennender Berg
- Centralia mine fire
- Darvaza gas crater
- Eternal flame
- Coal seam fire § List of mine fires
- List of mountains in Australia § New South Wales
- New Straitsville, Ohio § History
- Smoking Hills
- Yanar Dag
