= Bootleg mining =

Type of illegal coal mining

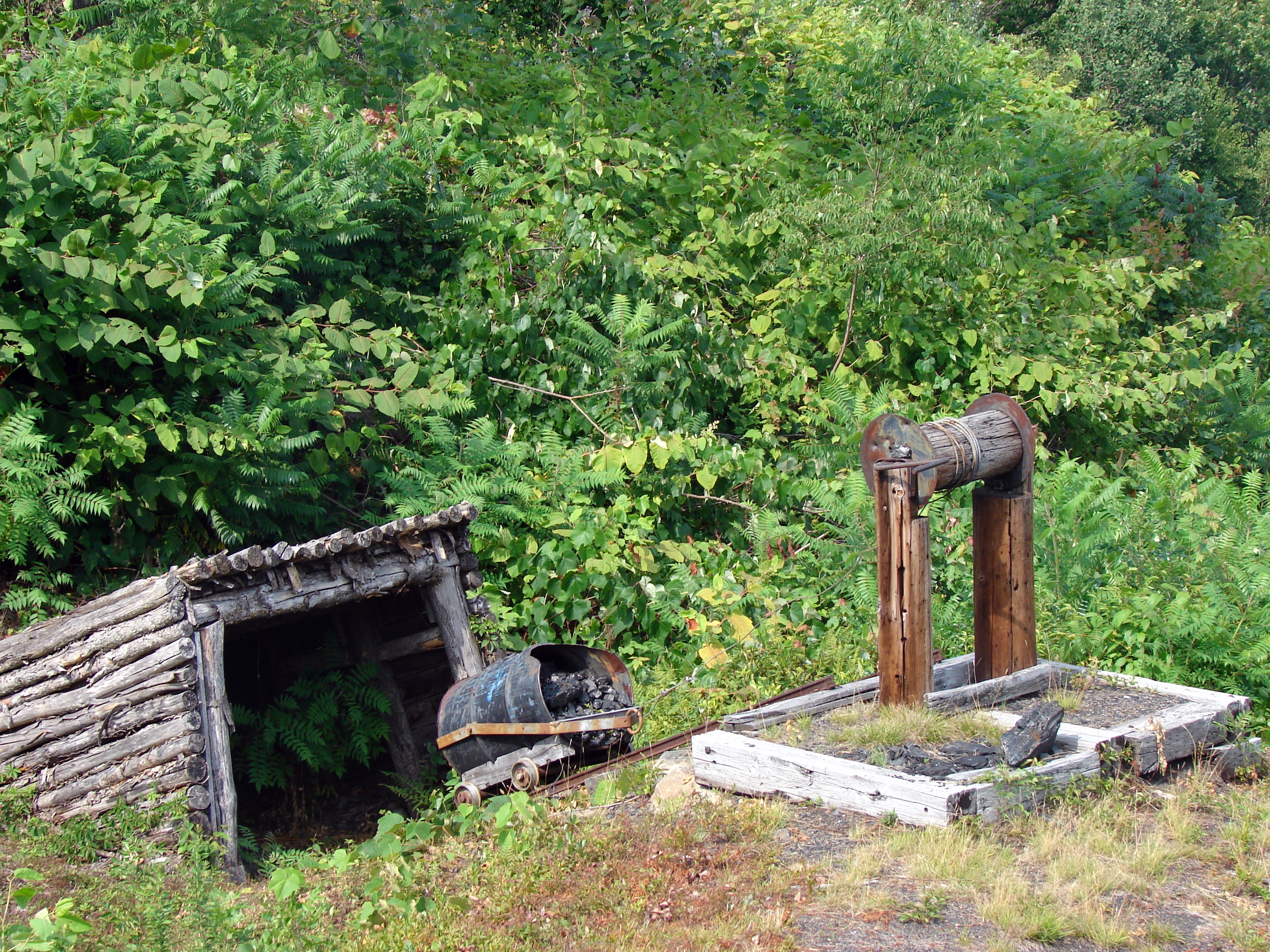
A bootleg mine shaft near Ashland, Pennsylvania. Here, one man would get into the cart and two other men would crank him down into the shaft. The man in the shaft would fill up the cart with coal and the two men at the top of the shaft would pull the cart up.

Bootleg mining or shoemaker mining is a form of illegal coal mining.

The term originated around the 1920s, though the practice probably predates that. Generally, a bootleg mine (sometimes called a bootleg pit) is a small mine dug by a handful of men. Often this took place surreptitiously on land owned by somebody else, such as a coal company. They were frequently dug by coal miners off official tunnels in order to procure additional, free coal for themselves, a practice that causes additional ramifications when fighting mine fires. Sometimes small pits are hidden under houses or outbuildings. Usually, the mine is not large enough to turn around in. The pits are known for being unsafe, and often causing collapse.

The practice has died away in the United States; an American with simple equipment cannot dig enough coal in a day to reach a living wage. Bootleg mines in China are still very common, as are the fatalities resulting from unregulated mining.

== In Pennsylvania ==
Shortly before the Great Depression, Pennsylvania's anthracite industry collapsed, shutting down collieries and throwing tens of thousands of miners out of work. Unemployed miners dug their own coalholes, often on company property, and began setting up bootleg breakers and trucking operations, creating an entire bootleg coal industry. According to a 1938 report commissioned by Governor George Howard Earle, there were as many as 1,965 bootleg holes, operated by over 7,000 bootleg miners, producing 2,400,000 tons of coal per year. By 1941, miners and police clashed over the dynamiting of their coalholes.

== In Poland ==
Bootleg mines were most frequently created in Upper Silesia during the economic crisis of 1929–1933, and were often the only source of income for entire families. Coal from bootleg mines was cheaper than coal sold by regular mines, which led to the destruction of bootleg mines by blowing them up and the police chasing illegal miners.

A resurgence of bootleg mining occurred in 1990s in Lower Silesia around the city of Wałbrzych, after all coal mines in the city were closed. The previously predominantly mining town was facing high unemployment rates and underlying coal deposits which surface as outcrops near the city are relatively easily accessible for bootleg mining. Due to the non-compliance with health and safety regulations and work performed by unqualified people, it is a very dangerous activity resulting in numerous accidents, including fatalities.

== See also ==
- Artisanal mining
- Freeminer
- Illegal mining
