= Smoking Hills =

Continuously burning cliffs in Canada

Coordinates: 69°31′N 126°33′W

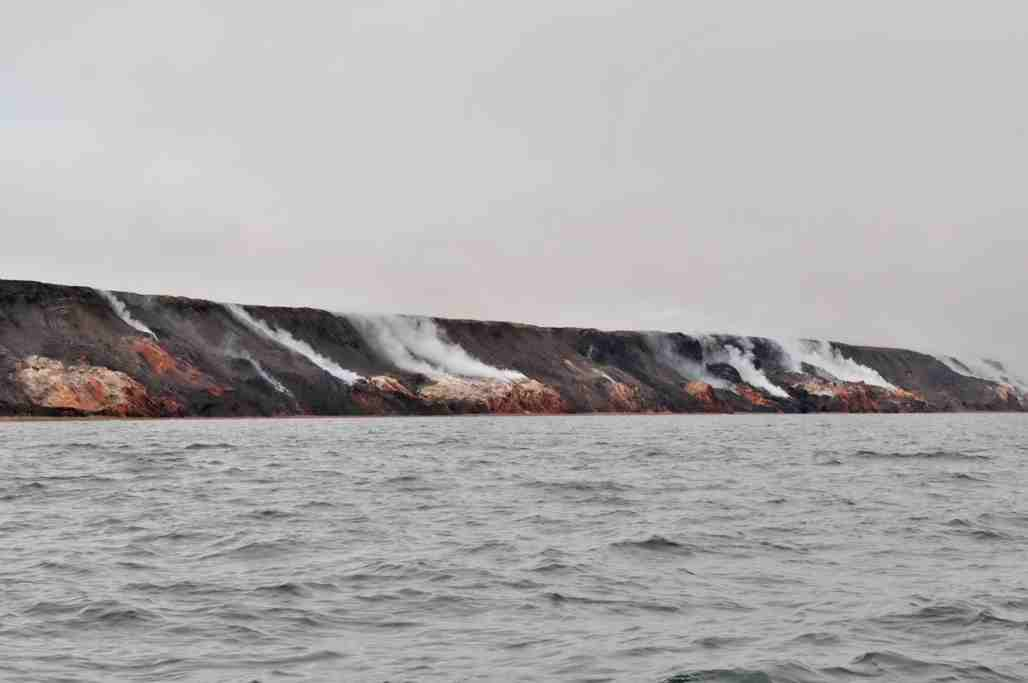
Smoking Hills southeast of Cape Bathurst, NT

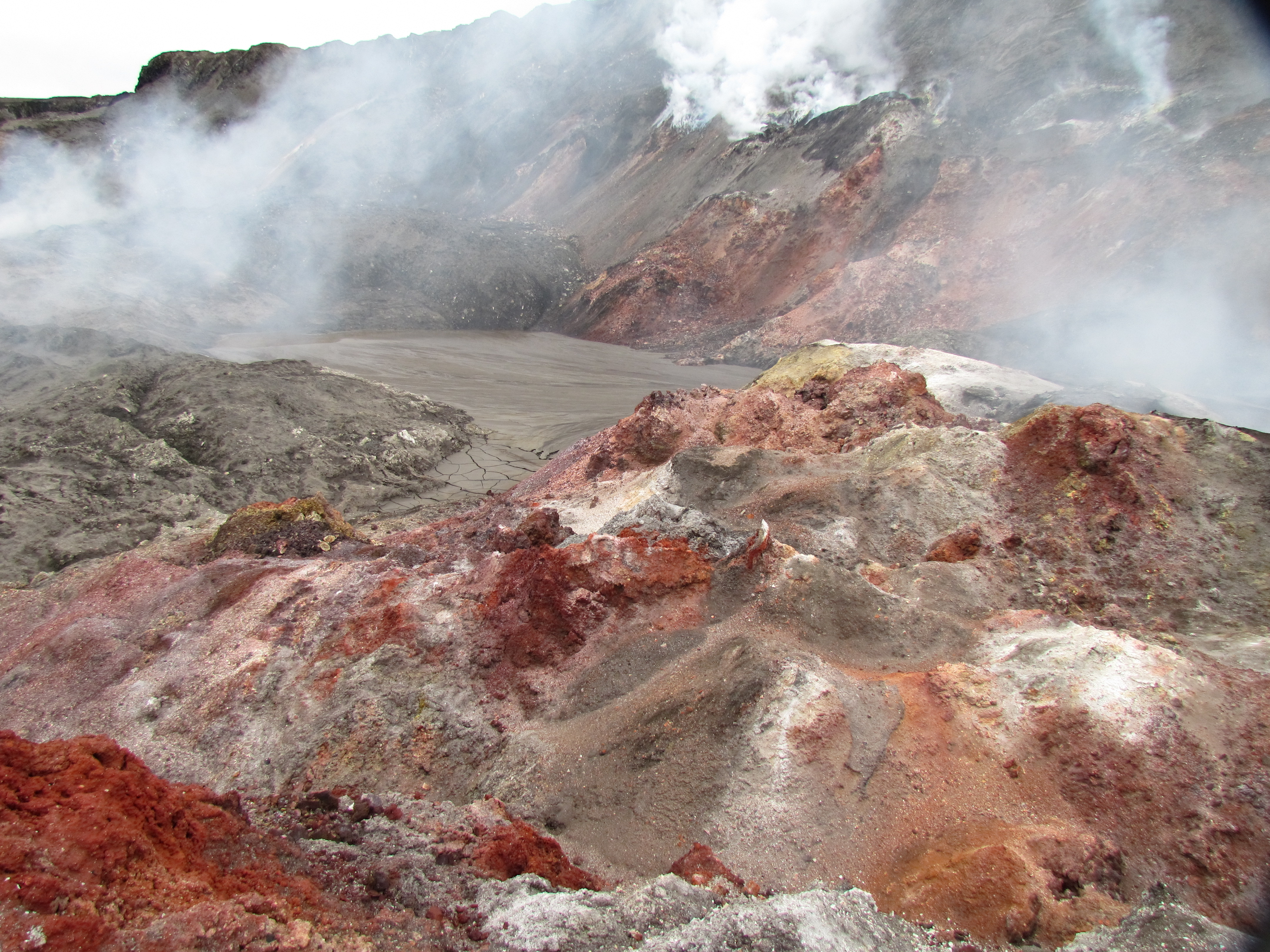
Clouds of smoke from burning sulfur-rich lignite deposits

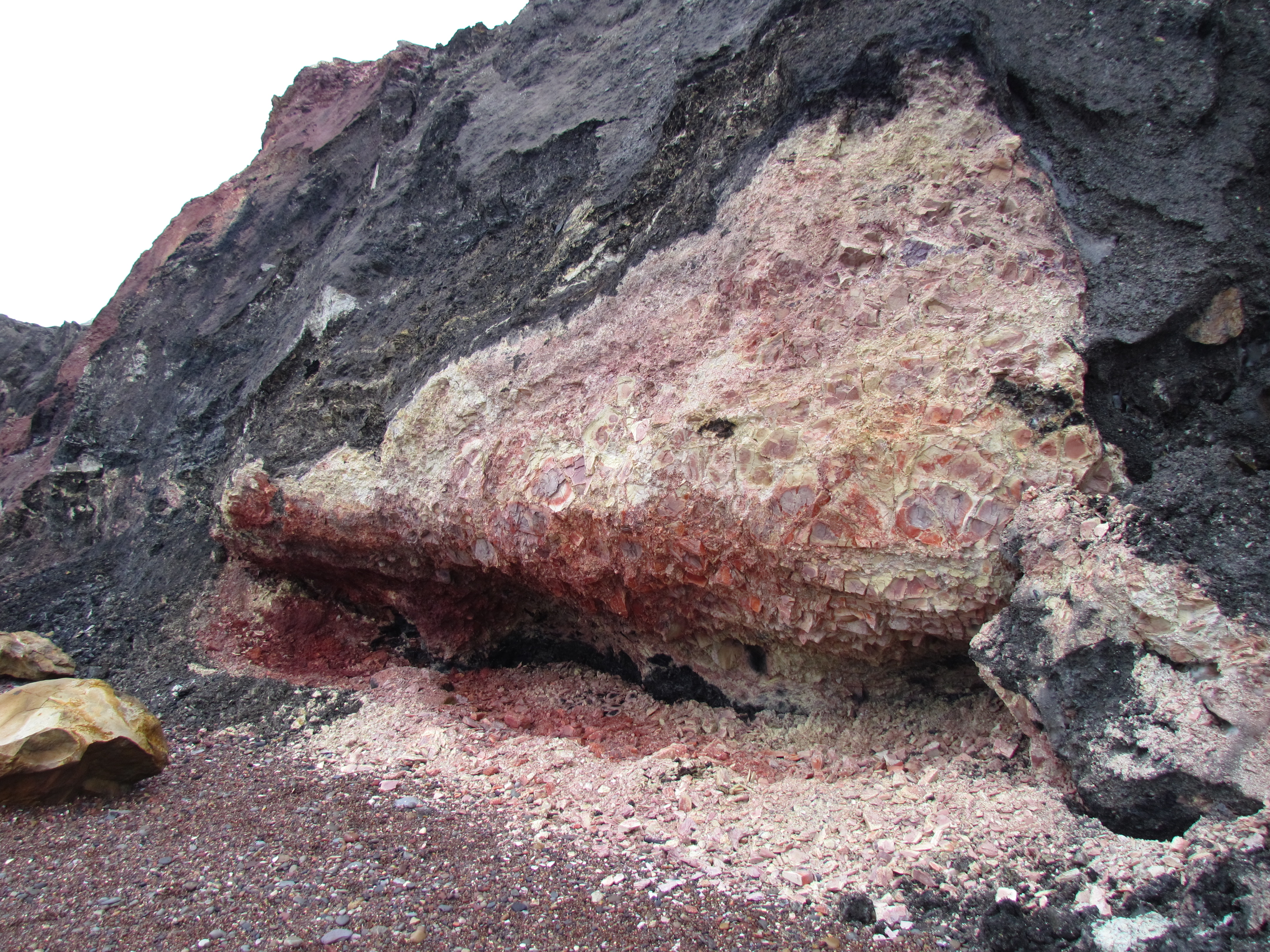
Eroding mud face continuously exposes new minerals from the Smoking Hills area

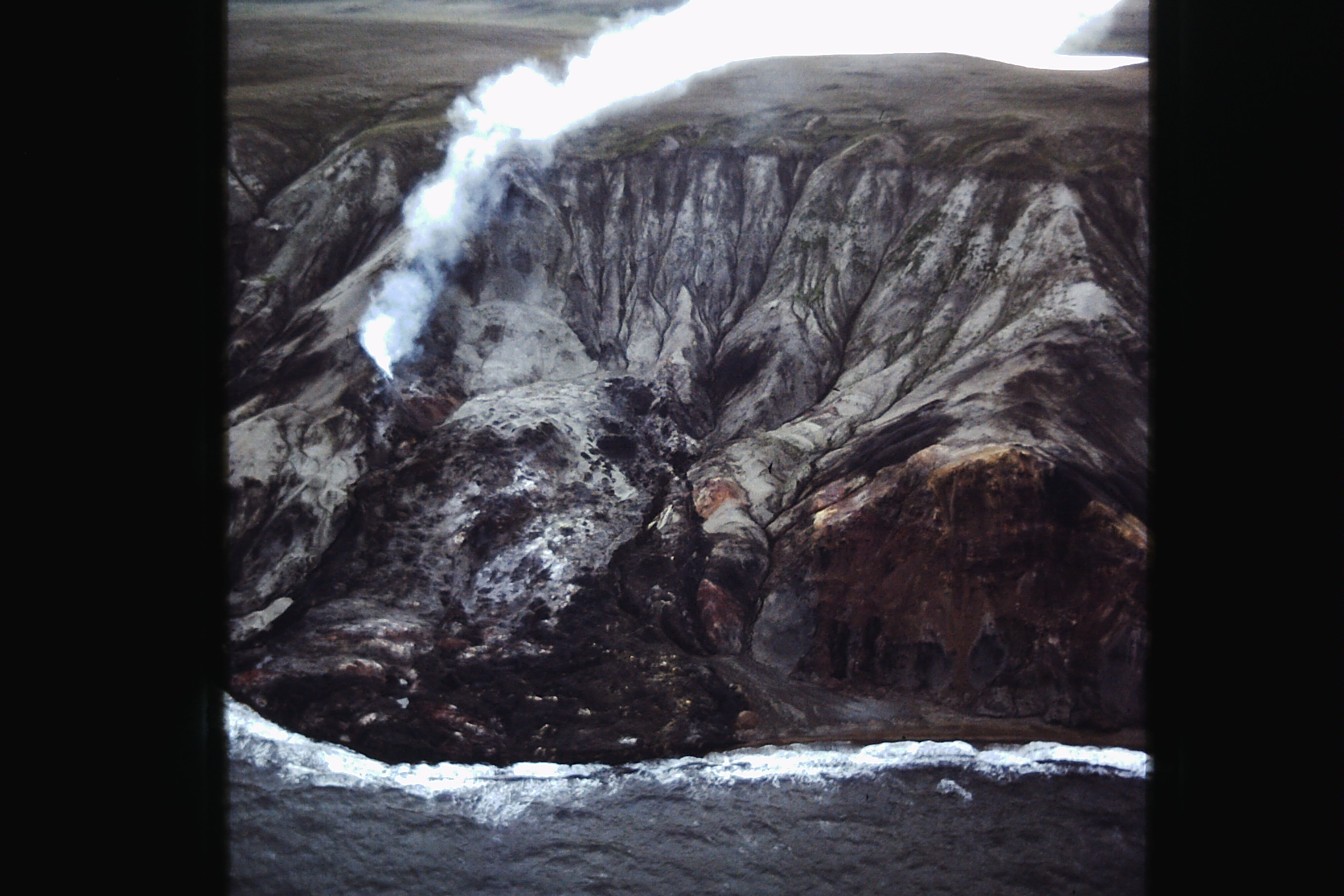
Smoking Hills in August 1987

The Smoking Hills are located on the east coast of Cape Bathurst in Canada's Northwest Territories, next to the Arctic Ocean and a small group of lakes. The cliffs were named by explorer John Franklin, who was the first European to see them on his 1826 expeditions. They contain strata of hydrocarbons (oil shales), which have been burning continuously for centuries.

The fires result from autoignition of sulfur-rich lignite deposits. The clouds of smoke have given the region its name. Over time the sulfur dioxide from the smoke has acidified the shallow ponds (< 1 hectare (2.5 acres) area and < 1 m (3 ft 3.4 in) depth) in the tundra dotting the area, down to a pH lower than 2. Elevated concentrations of metals (aluminium, iron, zinc, nickel, manganese and cadmium) occur in these acidic ponds. Soils and sediments have also been chemically altered. The acidic biota in the ponds are characteristic of acidic environments worldwide, in contrast to the typically Arctic biota in adjacent alkaline ponds. Although the soil of the region contains much limestone, the buffer effect has completely disappeared.

Weathering of the coastline of the area leads to the continuous exposure of new mineral deposits from the muds that make up the underlying geology. These are typically colored red when iron-rich.

The nearest community, Paulatuk, which is about 105 km (65 mi) east, is named in recognition of the coal found in the area, traditionally spelt "Paulatuuq" or "place of coal".

== See also ==
- Brennender Berg
- Burning Mountain
- Centralia mine fire
- New Straitsville mine fire

== External links and further reading ==
- Mathews, WH; Bustin, RM (1984). "Why do the Smoking Hills smoke?". Canadian Journal of Earth Sciences. 21 (7): 737–742. doi:10.1139/e84-080.
- Nakatsu, Cindy; Hutchinson, Thomas C (September 1988). "Extreme Metal and Acid Tolerance of Euglena mutabilis and an Associated Yeast from Smoking Hills, Northwest Territories, and Their Apparent Mutualism". Microbial Ecology. 16 (2): 213–231. doi:10.1007/BF02018915.
- "Smoking Hills". Geographical Names Data Base. Natural Resources Canada.
- "Topographic Map sheet 97C11". Atlas of Canada. Natural Resources Canada. 2010-02-04.
