= Post-traumatic stress disorder among athletes =

Prevalence of PTSD among athletes

- World map representing the presence of Post traumatic stress disorder within different countries
- Specialty: Psychiatry

Posttraumatic stress disorder (PTSD) is a cognitive disorder, which may occur after a traumatic event. It is a psychiatric disorder, which may occur across athletes at all levels of sport participation.

There is a difference between the responses of a PTSD episode and a normal response to trauma. If an athlete injures his or herself in a traumatic way, it is normal for them to go through some form of hardship before overcoming the injury. They may develop small flashbacks, have bad dreams, or feel like they can't get the traumatic experience out of their mind. Athletes may also have trouble with emotion regulation and developing coping strategies when they are under intense stress brought on by PTSD. There are many different ways to deal with the matter of having PTSD, with some therapy treatments including psychotherapy, art therapy or social engagement.

An injured athlete could also have Chronic traumatic encephalopathy, which includes too much trauma to the head from practice and games.

== History ==
There are many sports which are fairly dangerous and involve threatening activities, especially during competition. There is always the chance of athletes getting injured while competing or during training which is exactly the reason why a psychologist would eventually encounter a patient who is a serious athlete and is in need of their assistance to rehabilitate their PTSD. Psychology as a general occupation has dated back to times of 1878, and around 1897 the first psychologist specialising in sport was established, by the name of Dr. Norman Triplett. Ever since, sport psychologists were helping different athletes, in the mental aspect of their game, in order for them to reach their optimum potential.

PTSD became first evident due to those individuals who suffered extremely horrible experiences from war. Society noticed that those who took part in war, or had family members who took part in war, became distant from themselves and suffered terribly and found it difficult to cope with the tragedies. Researchers took note of this and aimed to evaluate the situation and come to a conclusion with how to rehabilitate these individuals, and while doing this they determined that these people had post-traumatic stress disorder.

PTSD is recognized in athletes because they put themselves in situations where their safety is threatened and they can sustain a serious injury, which can result in them developing PTSD from the serious injury and incident. Soon after this new-found disorder was established it made it far more clearer for those sport psychologists to treat their clients, as prior to the discovery of PTSD, sports psychologists, had to come up with alternative options to rehabilitate their clients who were experiencing PTSD. These psychologists often took their clients to play different sports, completely different from their own in aim to treat them in the most comfortable way possible.

== Etiology ==
Athletes may often hide the severity of an injury in order to continue participating in the sport. This denial of the severity of an injury could possibly lead to an early retirement in order for the athlete to refrain from sustaining permanent physical damage. Early retirement for an athlete could lead to feelings such as alienation, distress or uselessness. The degree to which an athlete identifies with a sport may have an impact on their emotional response to a traumatic injury. Individuals who identify strongly as athletes may be at an increased risk for psychopathology such as depression or PTSD after sustaining an injury.

=== Tiaina Baul "Junior" Seau Jr ===
An example of an athlete who experienced this is Tiaina Baul "Junior" Seau Jr. Junior Seau was an American NFL player who developed PTSD. He was born on January 19, 1969, and died on May 2, 2012. He played linebacker during his time in the NFL and had extensive experience in this role, despite the many injuries throughout his career. After his career in the NFL he developed differences in his personality due to brain injury. These changes consisted of impaired self-control and regulation, sensitive emotionally and his social skills decreased, which then led to alienation, something which was a strong opposite to his original personality. From there he developed insomnia and committed suicide via a self-inflicted gunshot to his heart.

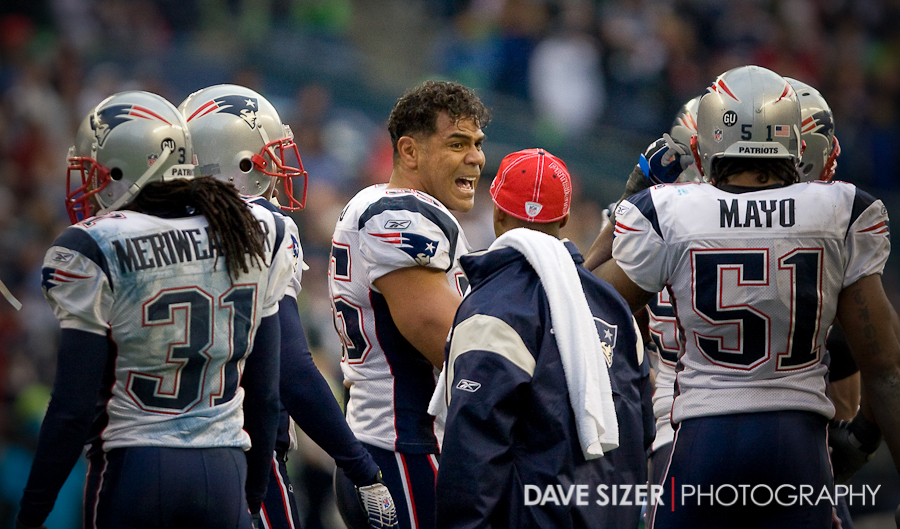
Junior Seau with his fellow Patriots

== Diagnosis ==
Posttraumatic stress disorder (PTSD) is a psychiatric disorder that usually occurs among individuals who have had a traumatic experience or have witnessed one (What Is Posttraumatic Stress Disorder, 2020). Acute stress disorder (ASD) is a good predictive of PTSD developing in individuals. PTSD usually follows acute stress disorder (ASD) due to them sharing the same symptoms (experiencing a traumatic event, experiencing intense emotional reactions, like an intense feeling of fear, etc). An individual is diagnosed with ASD first, but once the symptoms are prevalent longer than a month, the individual is diagnosed with PTSD. The most common individuals who experience PTSD are those among war, but it is not only veterans who experience this disorder. Individuals who have PTSD tend to have intense feelings and troubling thoughts in regards to their traumatic experience and these occur long after the traumatic experience has happened.

In order to be diagnosed with PTSD, an individual must have had exposure to a traumatic experience or event. According to the American Psychological Association and the DSM-5, to be diagnosed with PTSD, a person must have symptoms lasting for more than one month and it must cause a crucial problem or distress in the individual's daily functions (What Is Posttraumatic Stress Disorder, 2020).

== Treatment ==
=== Psychotherapies ===
There are several ways to treat PTSD, including various psychotherapies. Prolonged Exposure therapy (PE) is the most commonly used psychotherapy to treat PTSD, and it is proven a very effective treatment.

==== Art Therapy ====
There is also the option of art therapy, this was created by a man called Adrian Hill, in 1942 and is one of the earliest forms of treatment. This treatment is very beneficial to those with an open mind, it involves individuals to speak to a psychologist specializing in art, and the two both either paint, sculpt or any other forms of art.

===== Medications =====
Another form of treatment is treatment through medications; these medications aim to enhance their moments of happiness and reduce their moments of stress and anxiety. Some of these medications include fluoxetine, paroxetine, selective serotonin reuptake inhibitors (SSRIs), benzodiazepines and glucocorticoids. Typically, resulting to medications is a last resort, but unfortunately this type of therapy can be the matter of rehabilitating someone, meaning that the don't have to live with these PTSD symptoms for the remainder of their life which is not a preferred way of life.
