= 2019 in climate change =

This article documents events, research findings, scientific and technological advances, and human actions to measure, predict, mitigate, and adapt to the effects of global warming and climate change—during the year 2019.

== Summaries ==
- In November, BioScience published a Warning article stating "we declare, with more than 11,000 scientist signatories from around the world, clearly and unequivocally that planet Earth is facing a climate emergency" and that an "immense increase of scale in endeavors to conserve our biosphere is needed to avoid untold suffering due to the climate crisis".

== Measurements and statistics ==
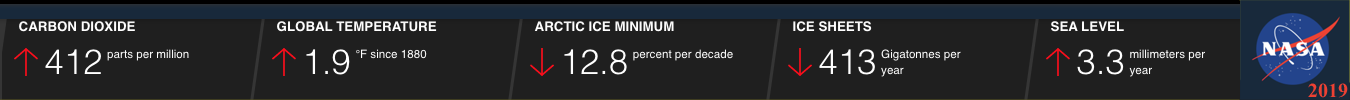
"Vital Signs of the Planet" as presented by NASA on 31 December 2019

- NOAA's National Centers for Environmental Information (NCEI) and the WMO reported that 2019 was the second hottest year in its 140-year climate record—0.04°C (0.07°F) cooler than 2016—with the U.K. Met Office ranking it among the three hottest.
- NOAA also reported that ocean heat content—the amount of heat stored in the upper levels of the ocean—was the highest ever recorded.
- NOAA also reported that both the Antarctic and Arctic oceans recorded their second smallest average annual sea-ice coverage during the 1979–2019 period of record.
- The WMO Global Atmosphere Watch in-situ observational network showed that carbon dioxide (410.5±0.2 ppm), methane (1877±2 ppb) and nitrous oxide (332.0±0.1 ppb) reached new highs in 2019, respectively constituting 148%, 260% and 123% of pre-industrial levels.
- The fire season in Sakha (Siberia) was unprecedented in the 20-year MODIS record in terms of an earlier start and northern extent, with some fires burning only about 11 km from the Chukchi Sea. From March through June, the burned area was greater than 2.9 times the 20-year mean.
- The Rhodium Group estimated that China contributed over 27% of total 2019 global greenhouse gas emissions (14 of 52 gigatons), surpassing the emissions of all OECD countries combined, though trailing them in per capita emissions; China was followed by the U.S. (11%), India (6.6%), Europe-27 (6.4%).
- 1 February 2022: a study published in PLOS Climate reported that, in 2019, 57% of the global ocean surface recorded extreme heat, compared to 2% during the Second Industrial Revolution, and that, between the 1980s and 2010s, the global mean normalized heat index increased by 68.23%. Researchers stated that "many parts of the subtropical and midlatitude regions have reached a near-permanent extreme warming state".

== Actions and goals ==
=== Political, economic, cultural actions ===
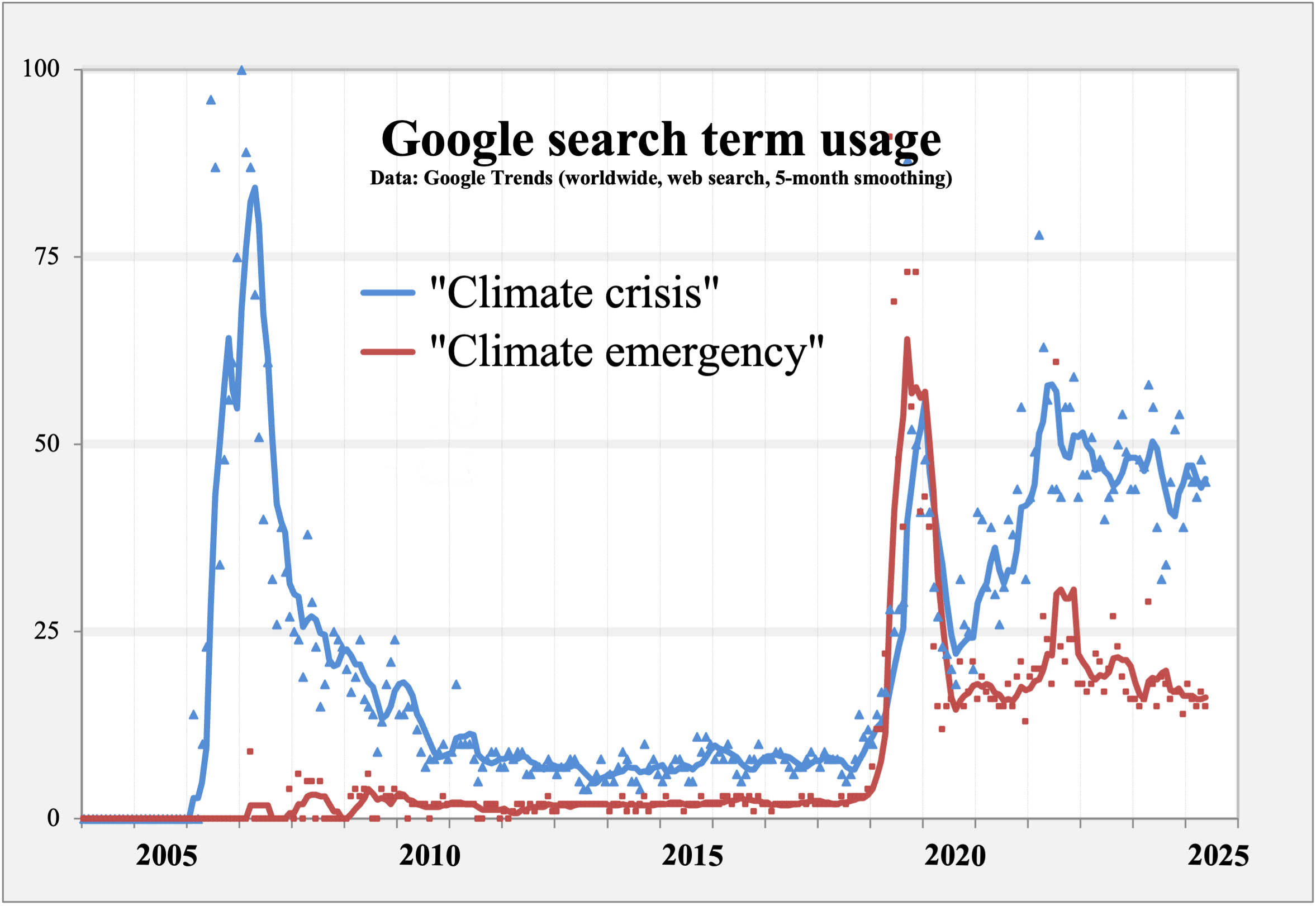
Google trends term usage suggests increasing awareness of the climate crisis and climate emergency declarations during 2019. The apparent waning of interest in the following year may be due to the COVID-19 pandemic.

- In 2019, Amazon and Global Optimism co-founded The Climate Pledge whose signatory companies pledge net-zero carbon emissions by 2040, stimulating investment in low-carbon products and services.
- In March, 16-year-old Swedish climate activist Greta Thunberg was nominated for the Nobel Peace Prize, also receiving a nomination the following year.
- In September, Thunberg spoke at the 2019 UN Climate Action Summit, criticizing world leaders for inaction on climate change.
- In December, Thunberg was named TIME Person of the Year.
- In Norway, electric cars comprised 54% of all new vehicle sales for 2019, making it the first country to have sold more electric cars than petrol, hybrid, and diesel engines in a year. The government planned to ban the sale of petrol and diesel cars by 2025.

== Public opinion and scientific consensus ==
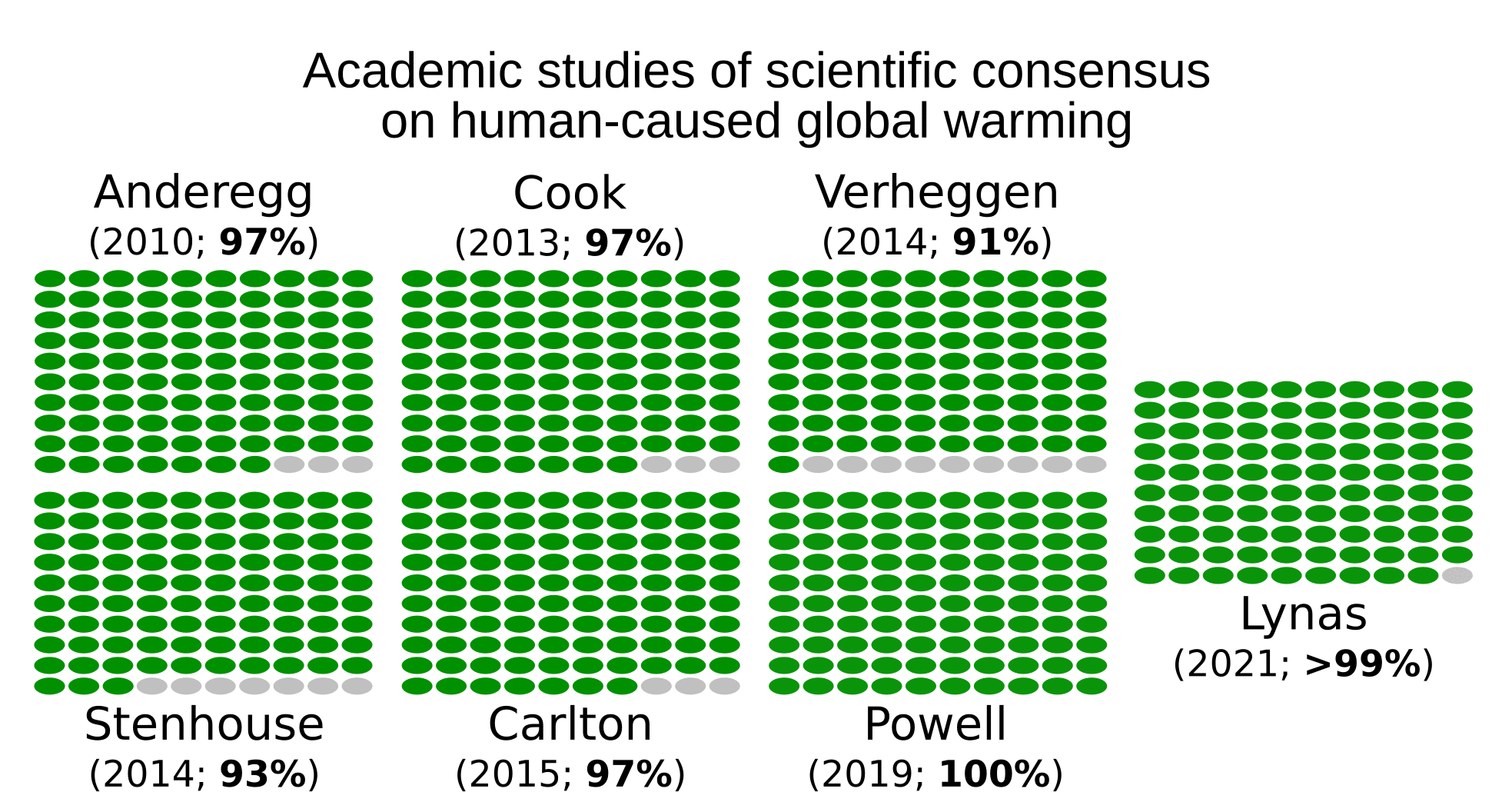
Academic studies of scientific agreement on human-caused global warming among climate experts (2010–2015) reflect that the level of consensus correlates with expertise in climate science. A 2019 study found scientific consensus to be at 100%.

- The consensus among research scientists on anthropogenic global warming grew to 100%, based on a review of 11,602 peer-reviewed articles on "climate change" and "global warming" published in the first 7 months of 2019.
- A 2019 survey indicated a clear majority of people around the world think climate change is happening and that it is all or partly down to human actions. However, 17% of Americans polled agreed that "the idea of manmade global warming is a hoax that was invented to deceive people", only Saudi Arabia and Indonesia having a higher proportion of people doubtful of manmade climate change.

== Projections ==
- In January, the World Economic Forum listed top 10 risks by likelihood (extreme weather events as #1, failure of climate change mitigation and adaptation as #2, man-made environmental damage and disasters as #6) and by impact (failure of climate change mitigation and adaptation as #2, extreme weather events as #3, man-made environmental damage and disasters as #9).

== Significant publications ==
- "Emissions Gap Report 2019" (PDF). UNenvironment.org. U.N. Environment Programme. 2019. Archived (PDF) from the original on 5 November 2020.
- Herring, Stephanie C.; Christidis, Nikolaos; Hoell, Andrew; Hoerling, Martin P.; Stott, Peter A., eds. (January 2021). "Explaining Extreme Events or 2019 From a Climate Perspective" (PDF). AMetSoc.net. American Meteorological Society. Archived (PDF) from the original on 27 January 2021.
- Myers, Joe; Whiting, Kate (16 January 2019). "These are the biggest risks facing our world in 2019". WEForum.org. World Economic Forum. Archived from the original on 14 January 2021.
- Ripple, William J.; Wolf, Christopher; Newsome, Thomas M.; Baarnard, Phoebe; et al. (5 November 2019). "World Scientists' Warning of a Climate Emergency". BioScience. 70 (1): 8–12. doi:10.1093/biosci/biz088. hdl:1808/30278.
- Watts, Nick; Amann, Markus; Arnell, Nigel; Ayeb-Karlsson, Sonja; et al. (13 November 2019). "The 2019 report of The Lancet Countdown on health and climate change: ensuring that the health of a child born today is not defined by a changing climate". The Lancet. 394 (10211): 1836–1878. doi:10.1016/S0140-6736(19)32596-6. hdl:10871/40583. PMID 31733928. S2CID 207976337.
- "Arctic Report Card: Update for 2020 / The sustained transformation to a warmer, less frozen and biologically changed Arctic remains clear" (PDF). National Oceanic and Atmospheric Administration (NOAA). December 2020. Archived (PDF) from the original on 8 December 2020. The Report Card comprises specific reports including:

• York, A.; Bhatt, U.S.; Gargulinski, E.; Grabinski, Z.; et al. (December 2020). "Wildland Fire in High Northern Latitudes". NOAA.gov. National Oceanic and Atmospheric Administration (NOAA). doi:10.25923/2gef-3964. Archived from the original on 10 December 2020.

== See also ==
- Climatology § History
- History of climate change policy and politics
- History of climate change science
- Politics of climate change § History
