= Delaware and Hudson Gravity Railroad =

American gravity railroad (established 1826)

Delaware and Hudson Canal Company Gravity Railroad
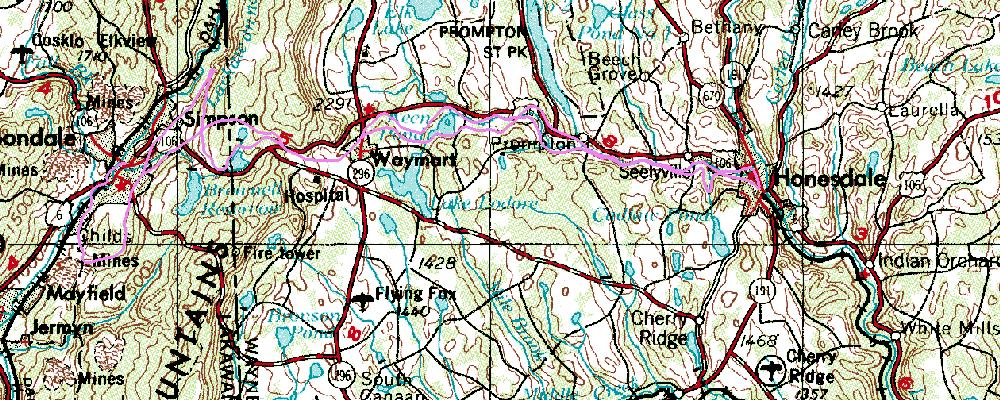

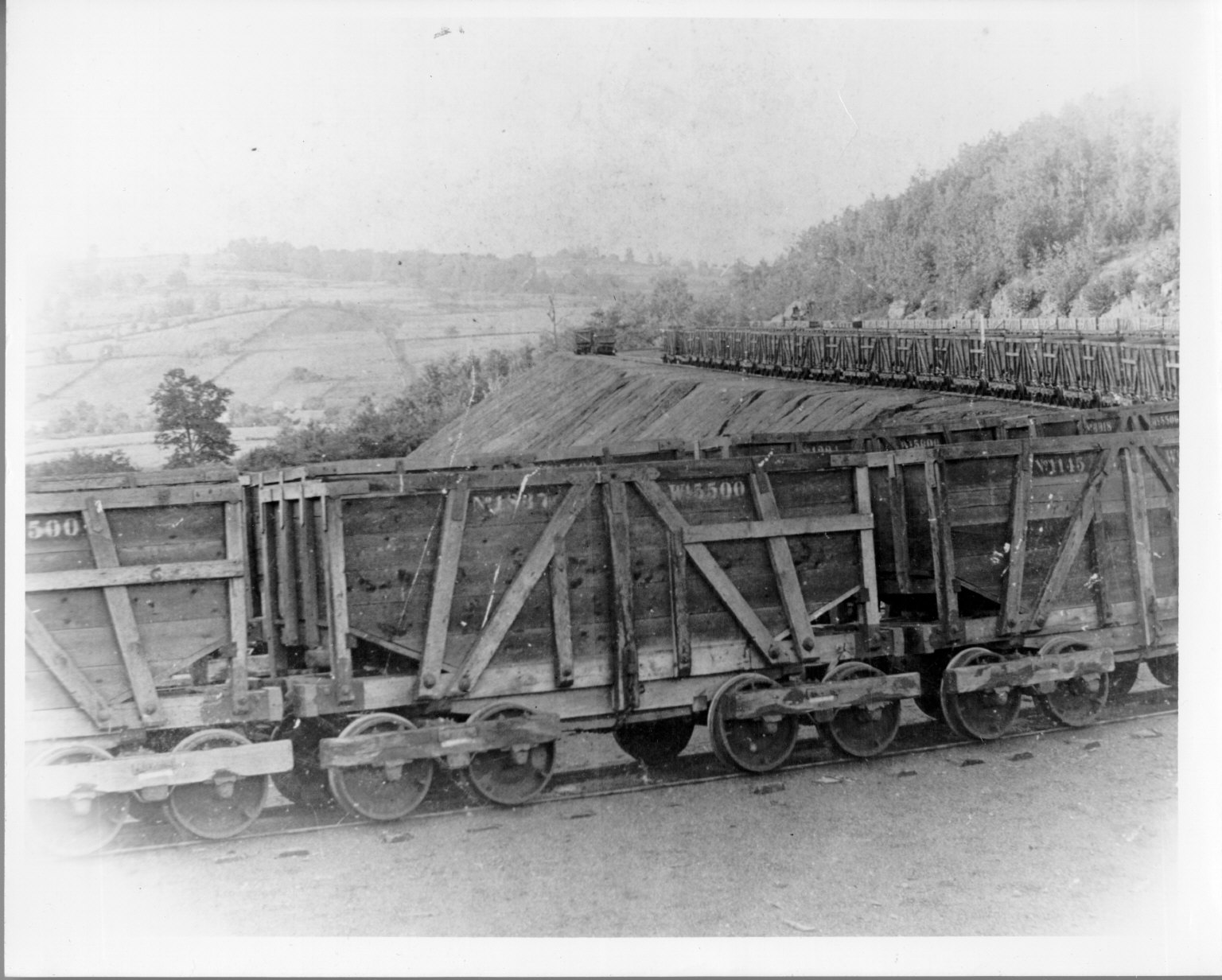

Overview
- Locale: Pennsylvania
- Dates of operation: 1829–1899

Technical
- Track gauge: 4 ft 3 in (1,295 mm)

The Delaware and Hudson Canal Company Gravity Railroad (D&H Gravity Railroad; D&HGRR) was a gravity railroad incorporated and chartered in 1826. It had land grant rights in the US state of Pennsylvania as a subsidiary of the Delaware and Hudson Canal. Built in the 1820s, it contains the first trackage of the Delaware and Hudson Railroad (eventually a Class I Railroad). Built to haul coal to canal boats, it was the second railway chartered in the United States after the Mohawk and Hudson Rail Road.

== Description ==
The 4 ft 3 in (1,295 mm) narrow gauge railroad carried coal from Carbondale North-northeast of Scranton over the Moosic Mountains to the D&H Canal in Honesdale. The gravity railroad was opened in 1829, then like most early railways, modified and expanded in stages through 1868. In its final form, the railroad used separate loaded and light tracks. In the gravity railway part, unpowered trains ran by gravity to the bottom of a grade manned by a brakeman operating a muscle powered hand-brake to control speed of descent, to the loading chutes. After being emptied, they were attached to a cable wound on large winch wheels (similar to a ski lift) and hauled up a short, steep inclined planes by a stationary steam engine. The loaded tracks had planes pointing in the direction of Honesdale; the light (return) tracks had planes pointing in the direction of Carbondale.

The gravity railroad operated until 1899, when the canal was abandoned, and was replaced entirely by a new standard 4 ft 8 1/2 in (1,435 mm) standard gauge line to be used as a conventional steam railroad. Many traces of the tracks remain in the Moosic Mountains. They can still be located on current aerial photographs.

The Delaware and Hudson Canal Gravity Railroad Shops have been demolished, but were once listed on the National Register of Historic Places.

== History ==
=== Initial Construction ===
1829–1844 Route of the D&H Gravity Railroad
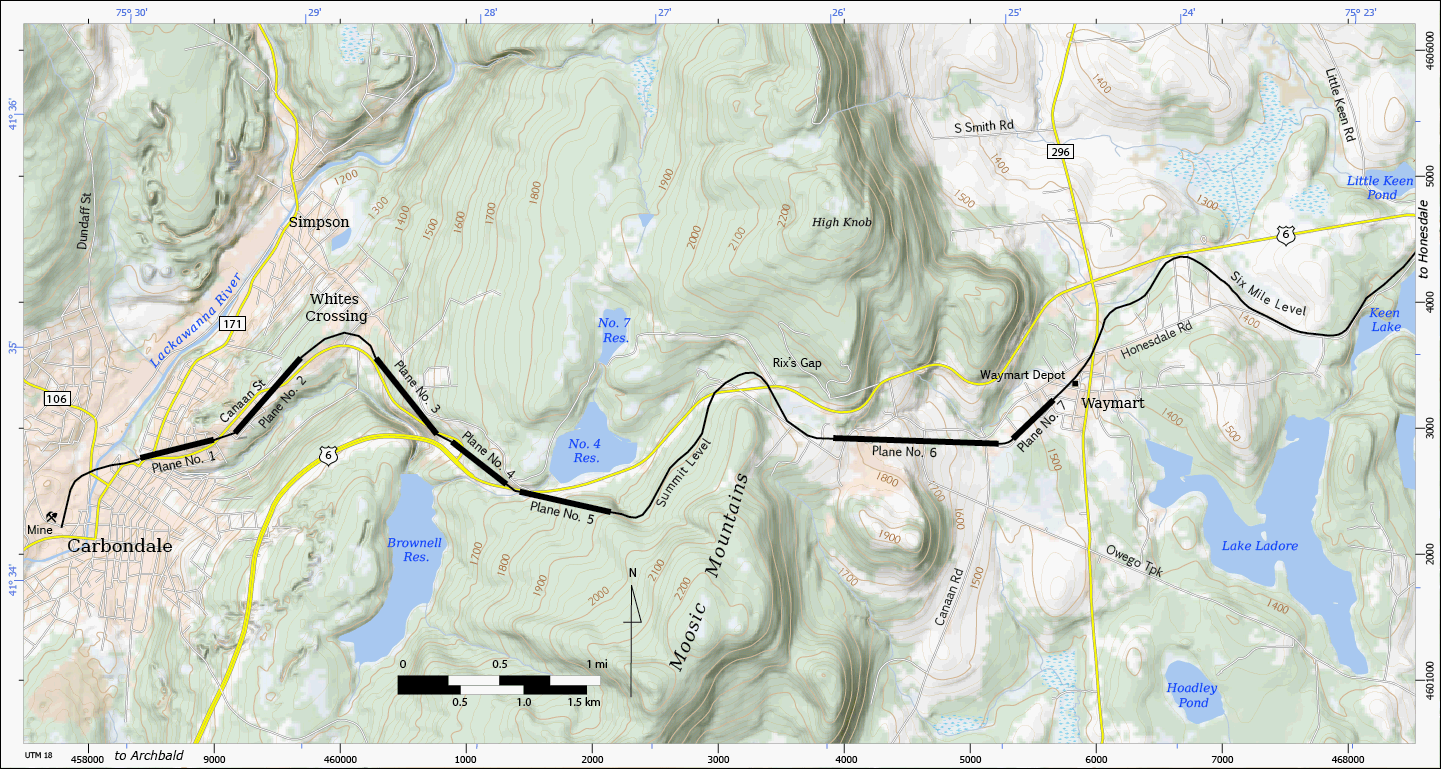
Carbondale to Waymart.

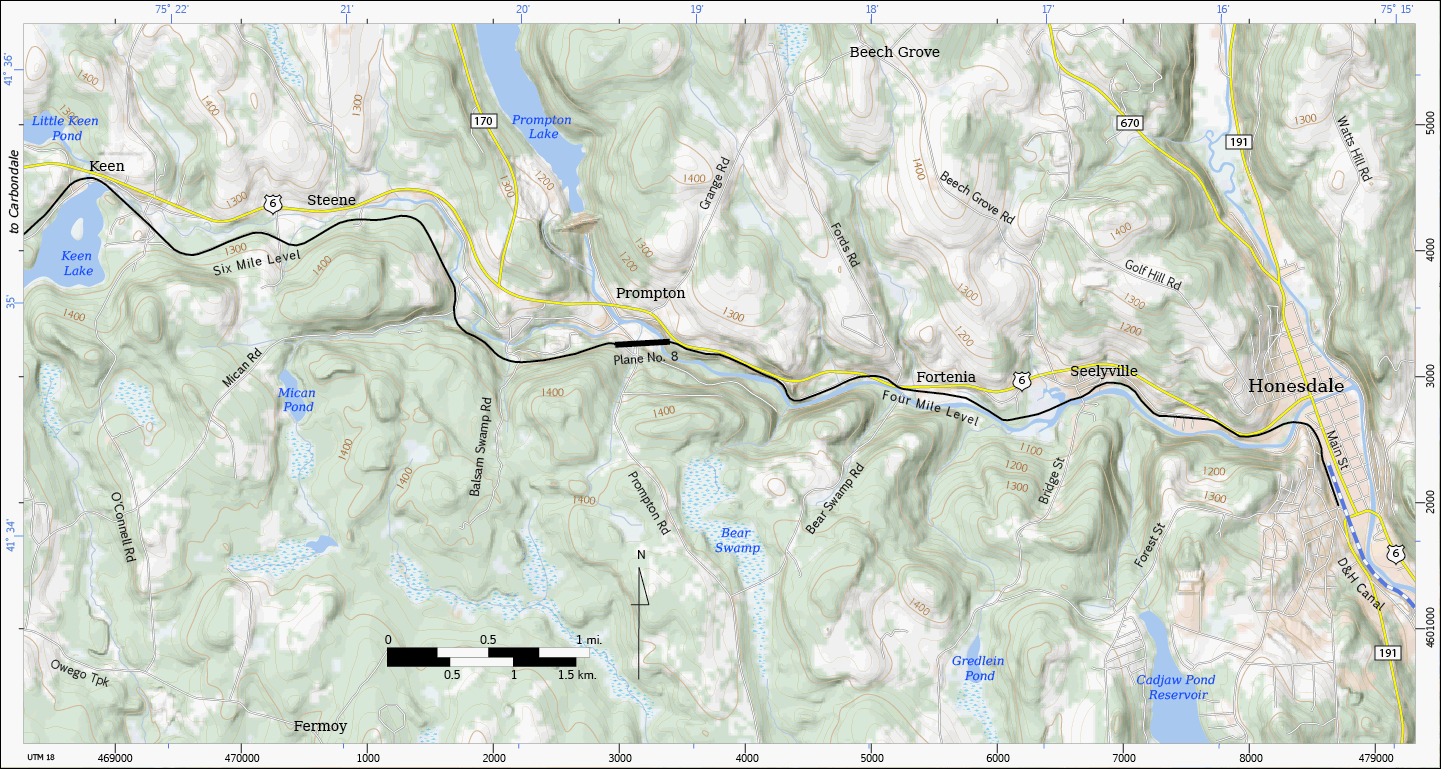
Waymart to Honesdale.

The railroad was originally constructed as a single track from Carbondale to Honesdale. It contained 5 planes ascending 863 feet (263 m) from Carbondale to the summit at Rix's Gap in the Moosic Mountains, and three planes on the 950-foot (290 m) descent to Honesdale where the railroad terminated at the D&H Canal. Each ascending plane was powered by a stationary steam engine which lifted the loaded cars to a "level" which was graded slightly to allow the loaded cars to roll by gravity to the foot of the next plane. In the opposite direction, the empty cars were towed by horses. Each plane contained a single track, with an automatically switched siding in the center where the loaded and empty cars could pass.

The descent of loaded cars between Waymart and Honesdale was interrupted by only a single plane at Prompton, where the track crossed to the north bank of the river and followed its course to Honesdale. From Waymart to Prompton, loaded cars coasted down the "six-mile level" (9.7 km), and after descending the plane at Prompton, were drawn by horses to the Honesdale terminal over the "four-mile level" (6.4 km). The levels were graded so that gravity alone would carry loaded cars on the six-mile level descending at the rate of 44 feet per mile (8.3 m/km), while the four-mile level descended at 26 feet per mile (4.9 m/km) and required horses in both directions, with one horse towing 5 cars.

Much of the railroad was built of trestles constructed from the region's native hemlocks. The rails were 6-by-12-inch (15 cm × 30 cm) hemlock timbers approximately 20 to 30 feet (6.1 to 9.1 m) long, placed on edge. The rails were surfaced with a half-inch thick, two and a half-inch wide (1.3 cm × 6.4 cm) iron strap screwed to the top. After a short time in service, the hemlock was discovered to be too soft, and a 4-inch (10 cm) wide hardwood board was positioned under the iron. On August 8, 1829, the railroad performed a trial of the first steam locomotive in America, the Stourbridge Lion, over the 3-mile (4.8 km) stretch of track from Honesdale to Seelyville, where a low bridge prevented further travel. The shaking timber trestles and rails convinced the officials that the road would not support the use of the locomotive, which was retired and never again used.

Horses drew the loaded cars from the mines to the foot of plane no.1 in Carbondale. In 1836, a short water-powered plane was added to lift loaded cars from the mine to a trestle crossing the river into Carbondale.

=== 1844 Improvements ===
1844–1858 Route of the D&H Gravity Railroad
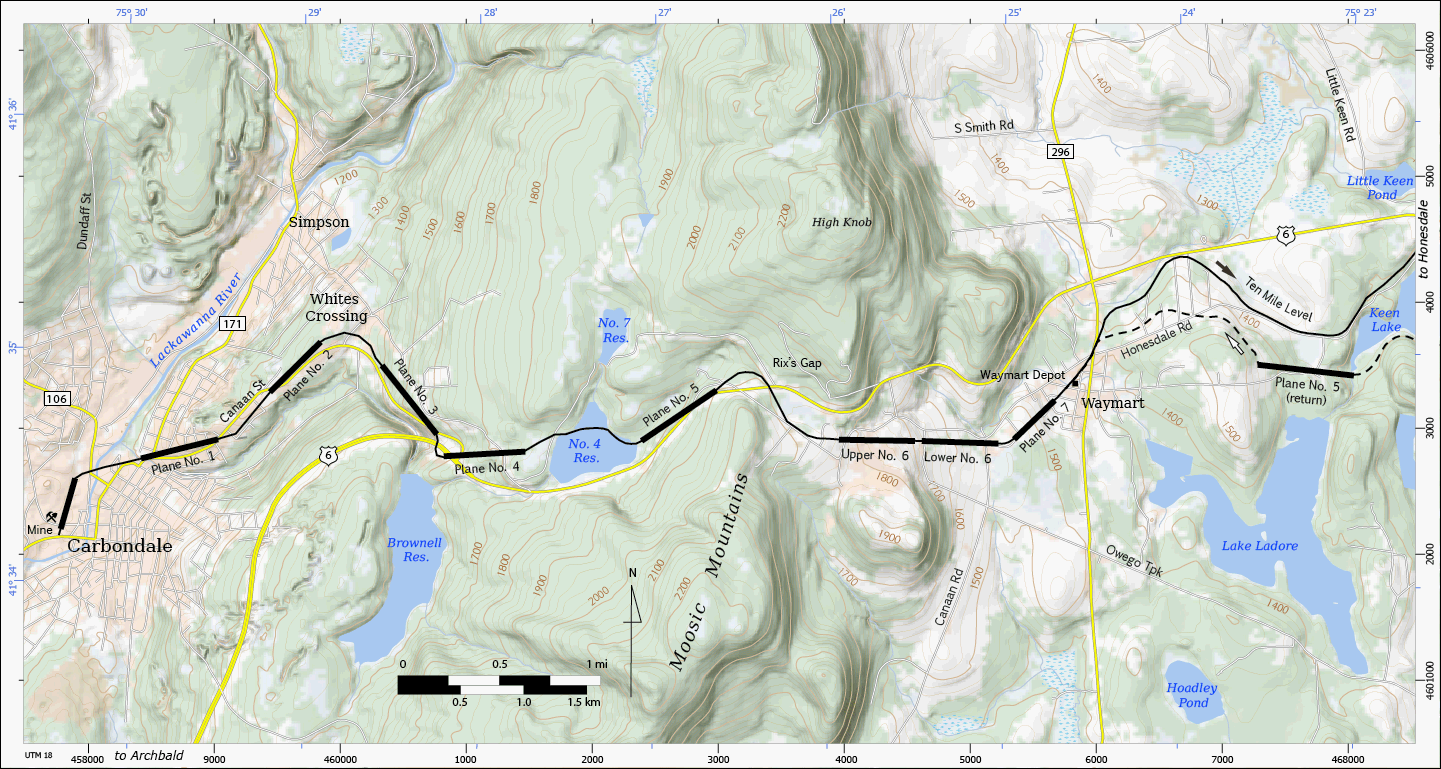
Carbondale to Waymart.

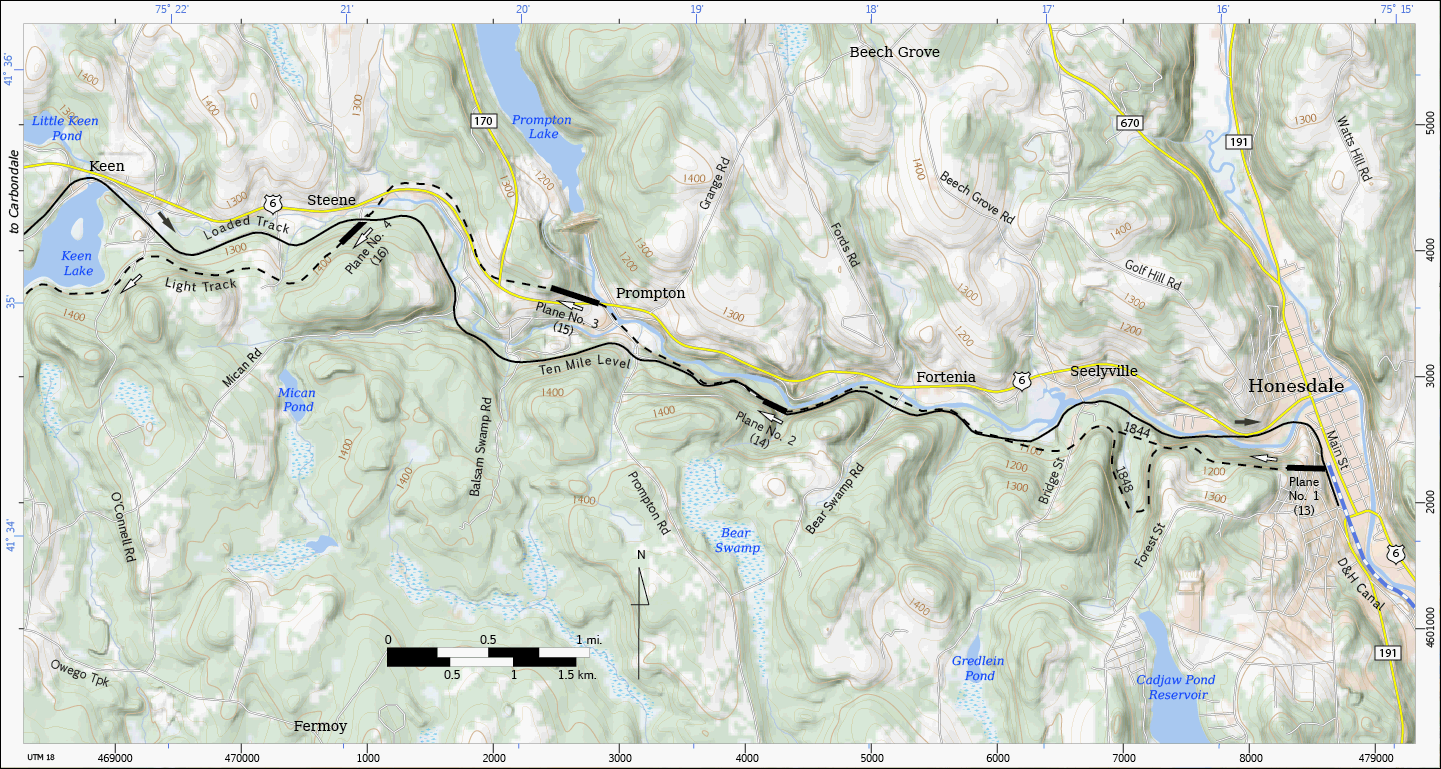
Waymart to Honesdale.

The road was designed to carry the output of the D&H's mine at Carbondale, transporting 100,000 tons per year (91,000 t) to the canal. In 1844, it was apparent that the road's capacity needed to be increased. The improvements raised the capacity to 500,000 tons per year (450,000 t).

The planes from Carbondale to the summit were realigned to shorten the summit level and increase its grade, and the long Plane No. 6 at Waymart was split into two planes. The road was also double-tracked. The most significant change was the addition of a separate "light track" to return empty cars from Honesdale to Waymart, and the elimination of the plane for loaded cars at Prompton. The light track contained 5 planes, which, except for the first plane at Honesdale, were positioned to take advantage of water power to lift the empty cars on the return trip to Waymart. The track for loaded cars was realigned at Prompton to eliminate the plane there, which allowed the loaded cars to coast under gravity power over a new "ten-mile level" (16 km) from Waymart to Honesdale, which now stayed along the southern bank of the river, descending 44 feet per mile (8.3 m/km) until reaching Honesdale.

The light track originally was carried by a 100-foot (30 m) high trestle across the ravine leading to Cadjaw Pond outside of Honesdale, but in 1848, the trestle was replaced by a horseshoe curve.

=== Southern extensions to Archbald and Olyphant ===
In 1848, the D&H extended the gravity railroad southward from Carbondale to newly opened mines at White Oak Run in Archbald. The extension continued the scheme for light and loaded tracks that had been adopted for the 1844 improvements. The light track commenced with a single "back plane" that lifted empty cars to the light track at Carbondale, where they then rolled under gravity power to the mine at Archbald. The loaded cars were towed from the mine to the foot of two planes at Archbald; after the planes lifted them they coasted to Carbondale.

Ten years later in 1858, additional mines were opened at Olyphant and the road was extended further. The planes on the southern extension were labeled with the letters "A" through "G" in north to south order from Carbondale to Olyphant.

Other important changes were made to the railroad. When originally built in 1829, iron chains were used to move the cars up and down the planes. Frequently the chains broke with catastrophic effect, so blacksmith forges were maintained beside the planes to facilitate repairs. It was soon found that hemp rope performed better than the chains, and all planes were converted to rope. In 1858, the hemp ropes were replaced with wire rope that had been manufactured by the Roebling company. Also during those improvements the strap iron rails were replaced with T rail.

1848–1863 Southern Extensions of the D&H Gravity Railroad
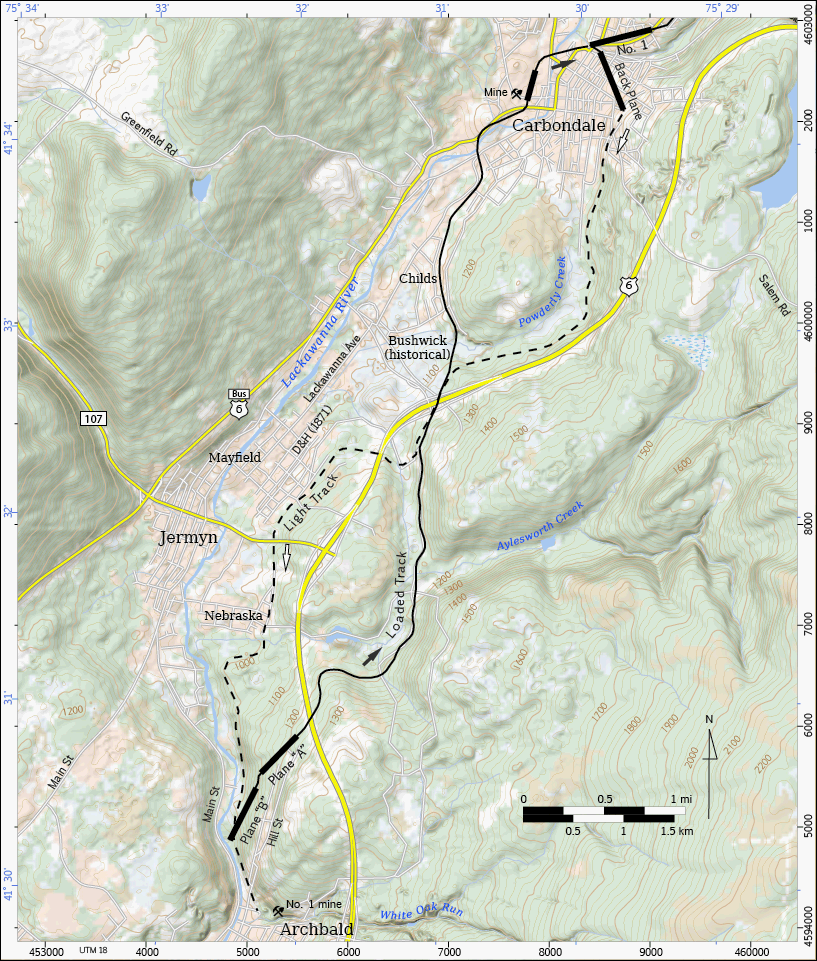
1848 – Carbondale to Archbald.

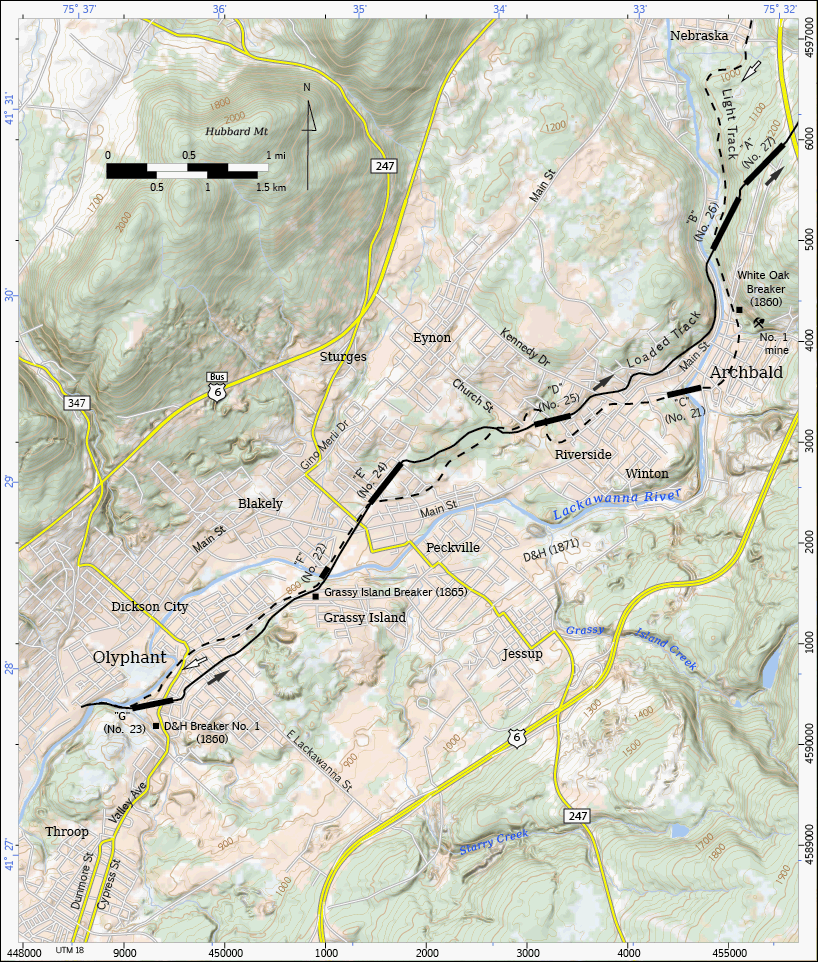
1858 – Archbald to Olyphant.

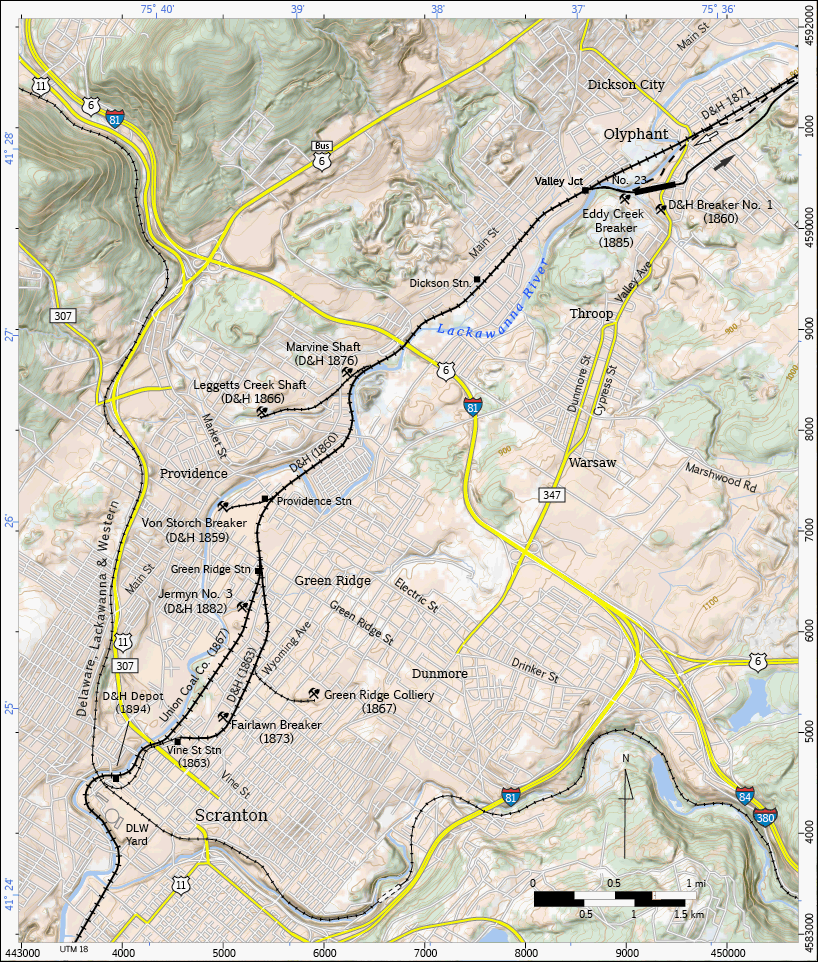
1860–1871 – Olyphant to Scranton.

=== Steam-powered extension to Providence and Scranton ===
In 1860, the D&H opened new mines in Providence and extended the line to them, a distance of approximately 4 miles (6.4 km). Rather than continuing the gravity line to the mines, the D&H used its first steam locomotives on the new line south of Olyphant, using the 4 ft 3 in (1,295 mm) narrow gauge of the gravity railroad. In 1863, the railroad was extended to the Scranton terminal at Vine Street, where the company built a station and office building. The railroad also started daily passenger service from the Vine Street station to Carbondale.

In 1871, the steam line was extended northward from Valley Junction at Olyphant to Carbondale, where the line connected to the Jefferson Railroad and the Erie Railroad. Portions of this "valley line" had four rails: a common rail, a rail for the 4 ft 3 in (1,295 mm) narrow gauge of the gravity railroad, a rail for 4 ft 8 1/2 in (1,435 mm) standard gauge, and a rail for the 6 ft (1,829 mm) broad gauge of the Erie.

=== 1868 renovations ===
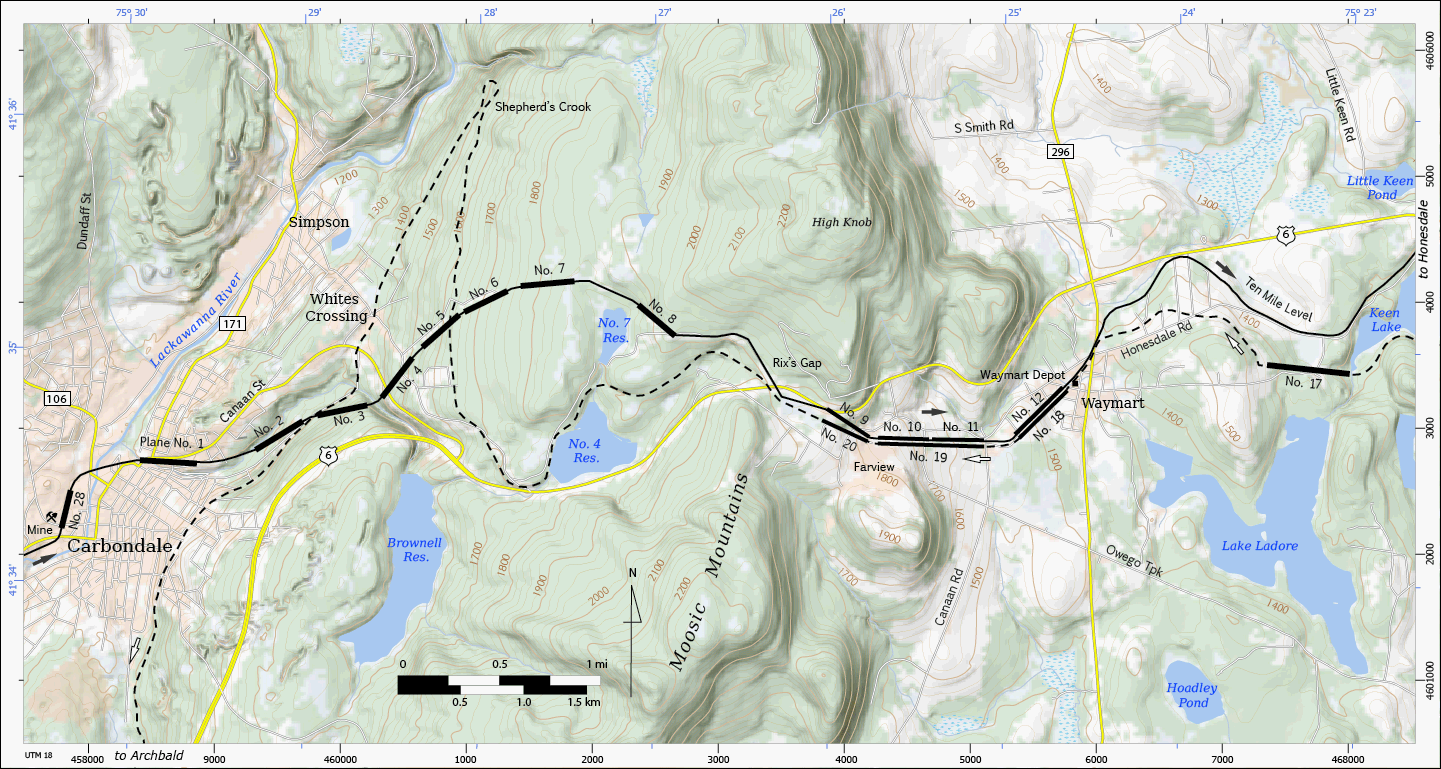
1868 improvements between Carbondale and Honesdale

In 1866, the D&H purchased the Union Coal Company Railroad which connected with the D&H at Green Ridge. Even though the line was under a 20-year lease to the Lehigh and Susquehanna (which in turn was leased to the Central Railroad of New Jersey) and the D&H could not begin operating the line until 1886, the company nevertheless anticipated increased coal tonnage as a result of its 1866 acquisition, and expanded the gravity road accordingly. After the improvements the line had a capacity of 3,000,000 tons (2,700,000 t) annually, which remained its capacity until its closure in 1899.

Substantial modification was made to the line between Carbondale and Waymart. The five planes which raised loaded cars to the summit at Rix's Gap were replaced by eight planes on a completely new alignment, the separate light track was extended from Waymart to the head of the back plane at Carbondale, and the back plane was eliminated. The water-powered planes on the light track had already been replaced by stationary steam engines, and all planes were being operated by steam.

The new light track contained a 400-foot (120 m) radius hairpin turn at Panther Bluffs which became known as the Shepherd's Crook, later providing extensive views when passenger service between Carbondale and Honesdale was started in 1877.

The planes were re-numbered consecutively starting at Carbondale, following the loaded route to Honesdale, then back on the light track to Olyphant, and finally up the loaded track to Carbondale. The gravity line kept that 1868 form for the remainder of its life as a gravity operation. Following the abandonment of the canal in 1898, the gravity line was abandoned and replaced with a 4 ft 8 1/2 in (1,435 mm) standard gauge steam line, which operated until its abandonment in 1931.

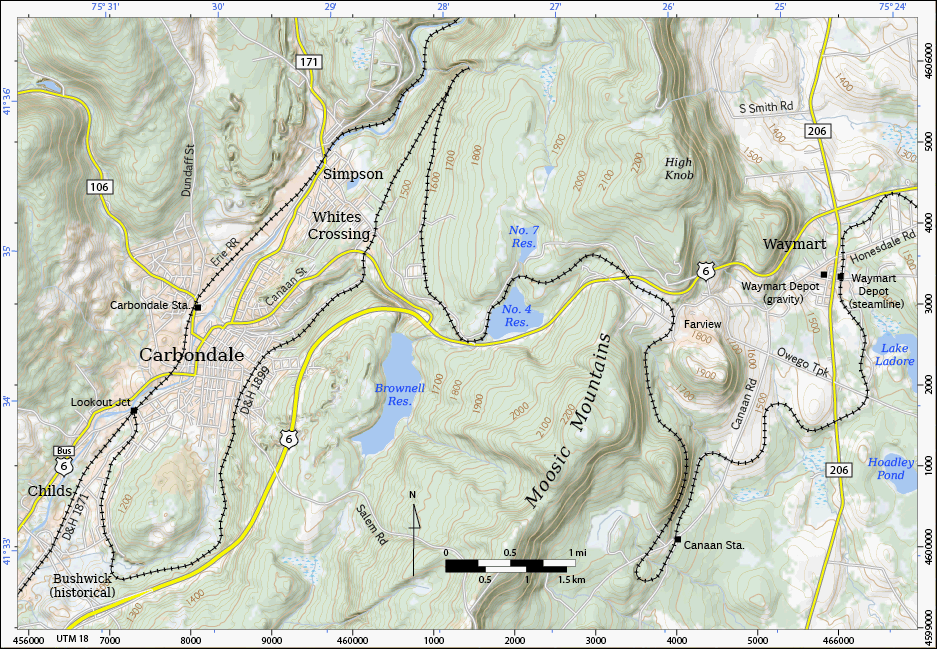
1899 steam line between Carbondale and Honesdale

The steam line followed the route of the loaded track between Waymart and Honesdale, and a new alignment from Waymart to Carbondale was built around the foot of Moosic Mountain, looping south to Canaan and rejoining the light line near the head of plane no. 20 at Rix's Gap, where it continued along the light route to Bushwick and Lookout Junction. The hairpin turn at Shepherd's crook was replaced with a switchback.

=== Passenger service ===
Although designed for transporting coal to the canal at Honesdale, the line became a popular excursion route when it began passenger operations. Service began as early as 1860 with two small passenger cars running the steam-powered segment between Providence and Valley Junction at Olyphant. By 1868, daily service operated between Carbondale and Providence consisting of 8 passenger and 2 baggage cars. In 1877, passenger service began between Carbondale and Honesdale.

To increase the road's popularity with visitors, the D&H built a 600-acre (240 ha) picnic park at Farview near the highest elevation of the line. A hike up a mountain trail to observation towers at the High Knob peak offered visitors extensive vistas. A connection from the light track to the loaded track was constructed at Bushwick for the convenience of passengers from Honesdale. The passengers cars were met by steam engines at Lookout Junction and brought into Carbondale.

In 1907, the D&H offered the 625 acres (253 ha) it owned at Farview to the state for construction of a state hospital for the criminally insane. The state combined the D&H property with a 468-acre (189 ha) farm and the Fairview facility remains in use to this date as the State Correctional Institution – Waymart. (Although the D&H picnic park was named Farview, the state institutions used the name Fairview.)
