= Hendrick Manufacturing Company =

American perforated metal manufacturer

- Company type: Private
- Industry: Metal Perforating & Fabrication
- Founded: 1876
- Headquarters: Carbondale, PA, USA
- Area served: International
- Key people: Pansy L Drake, Chairman of the Board
- Products: Perforated Metal and Sheet Metal Fabrication
- Number of employees: 117 (2008)
- Parent: Drake Industries LLC
- Website: https://www.hendrickcorp.com/

Hendrick Manufacturing Company is an American perforated metal manufacturer founded in 1876 in Carbondale, Pennsylvania, where it is still based. Over the years, additional manufacturing locations were established in California, Tennessee, Kentucky and Illinois. Plants in Pennsylvania, Kentucky and Illinois are still in operation.

== History ==
=== Eli Hendrick ===
Born in 1832, Eli Hendrick apprenticed as a wood turner in his native Michigan. After developing an interest in oil refining, he built a refinery in Carbondale, Illinois.

Hendrick founded his metal-working company in 1876 in Carbondale, Pennsylvania. He innovated a process for punching holes into sheet metal while punching holes into metal plate.

The company later developed new products including “Galena Signal Oil,” an extra-fine kerosene for railway lighting, and “Plumboleum”, a gear box lubricant that remained a basic ingredient of automotive lubricants for 75 years.

The filter presses used in the refining process consisted of mats of woven wire and canvas. In constant use, the wire eventually was abraded to the point where it pierced the canvas, reducing the efficiency of the filter. Hendrick reasoned that a metal sheet, properly perforated, could replace the canvas-and-wire filter, giving it a longer life. Several tries at drilling holes, first individually, then in a multiple drill-press proved that the concept was sound, but the production process was too costly. He then conceived the idea of punching holes simultaneously in the sheet metal. The metal-punching machine he developed was a pilot for the modern perforating press and the foundation upon which Hendrick Manufacturing Company was started in 1876.

Over the next 100 years, the company steadily expanded its technology and its product lines, branching out from the original oil and coal industries into aggregate, iron, steel, paper, material handling, construction and other industries where perforated or slotted sheets of material are required.

=== California Perforating Company ===
In 1884, California Perforating Screen Company (Cal-Perf) was founded by the Wagner family to manufacture hammer mill and grain-cleaning screens for California’s growing agricultural industry. These items were produced on throat presses using tooling limited to 6” lengths. In order to penetrate additional markets, Cal-Perf purchased stock-size sheets and light plates that were perforated on multi-punch, all-across presses operated by the Eastern and Mid-Western perforators at the time. Cal-Perf stocked these sheets for resale in its San Francisco warehouse.

Hendrick Manufacturing Company purchased California Perforating Screen Company in 1966 and moved the operation into a larger facility. This larger plant could accommodate additional throat presses and supporting equipment such as shears, straightening rolls, press brakes and bending rolls. Three new, multi-punch, all-across presses were added to product custom perforated sheets that were being purchased at the time from Hendrick's Carbondale plant. Under Hendrick ownership, Cal-Perf grew from an office manager and four plant operators to a total of 23 employees.

When the lease on the San Francisco facility expired in 1982, Hendrick moved the Cal-Perf operations to Visalia, California, in order to be closer to the Los Angeles market. At the same time, in order to gain warehouse space and a sales office, Hendrick purchased Berglund Perforated Metal in Los Angeles. In 1985, at the termination of the purchase agreement, Hendrick merged the operations of Berglund into Cal-Perf.

=== Profile screens ===
Hendrick Manufacturing Company first entered the profile screen market in the early days of World War II. This demand was created when the US supply of profile screens from Germany were cut off. At that time, Hendrick was asked to furnish perforated u-clips to the Wedge Bar Screen Corporation, a small manufacturer of profile screens located in Queens, New York.

In 1943, Fred Goldbeck joined the sales force in Hendrick's New York office. Goldbeck was knowledgeable in the use of profile screens, and he led efforts to manufacture complete profile screens for the coal, mining and paper industries.

The market for screens increased rapidly after World War II. Hendrick Manufacturing Company began to import fine wire screens from Aumeca, a Belgian firm. In 1953, Greening, a company located in England was selected to supply wedge wire screens for Hendrick. Greening introduced a series of mini-wedge wire screens and Hendrick abandoned the Aumeca screens from that point forward.

In 1969, Hendrick employed Leon Bixby to serve as product manager for profile screens. Bixby’s father had previously worked in design and development of profile screens for the Wedge Wire Screen Corporation of Wellington, Ohio, which had been started by his father. Bixby brought new success to the profile screen business for Hendrick. In the early 1970s, he convinced ownership that profile screens would always be considered a secondary product as long as they were manufactured in Carbondale alongside the far more popular perforated metal products. Because the largest market for profile screens was the coal industry that was growing rapidly in West Virginia, Ohio, Kentucky and Indiana, Hendrick chose Owensboro, Kentucky, for the site of the Hendrick Screen Company. This was a separate incorporation which opened up in a brand new facility in 1974.

Since then, Hendrick Screen Company has expanded into other markets such as wastewater treatment, water intake, petrochemical, dewatering, and architectural.

=== Tennessee Perforating ===
In 1971, Hendrick Manufacturing Company commissioned the Georgia Institute of Technology to evaluate demand for perforated metal in the nine states of the southeastern United States. The study supported the idea of a satellite location. Hendrick did not move on this information quickly, and the competition opened plants in the Southeast during the late 1970s.

In 1984, Hendrick conducted a site survey and determined that Memphis, Tennessee, was a good location to service the southeast and still be competitively located to service the Midwest. A new plant was opened with three 36” wide high-speed, all-across perforating presses relocated from the Carbondale plant. These presses were selected to supply a full range of light gauge, small hole perforations in materials up to 18 gauge thickness. The associated equipment was installed and operations began in September 1984.
