= Laurel Run mine fire =

Mine fire in Luzerne County, Pennsylvania

Coordinates: 41°13′26″N 75°51′28″W

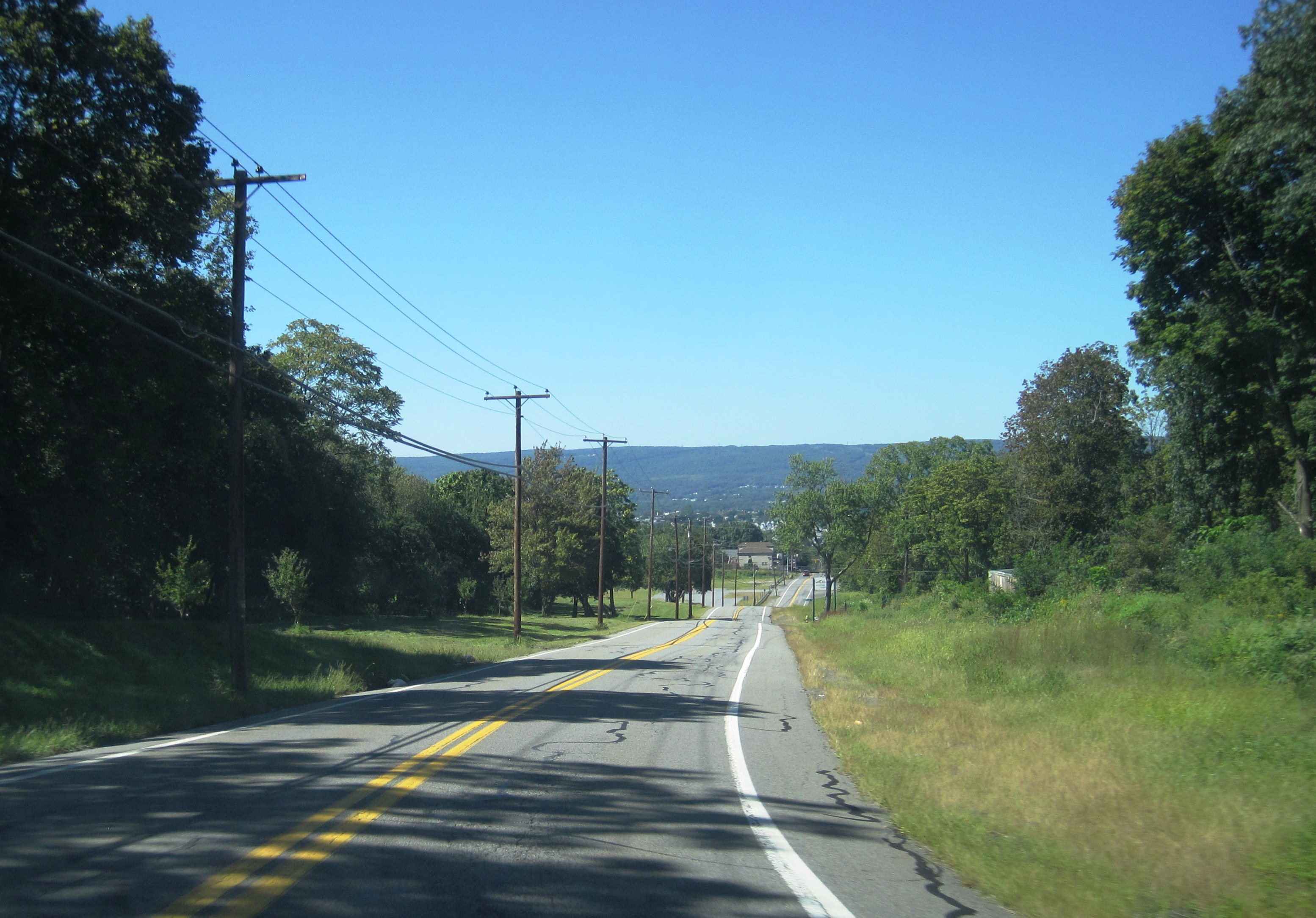
- Area along Laurel Run Road previously occupied by houses until the 1960s
- Date: December 6, 1915
- Location: Red Ash Coal Mine and surrounding areas, Luzerne County, Pennsylvania
- Cause: Lit carbide lamp ignited coal bed
- Property damage: Much of the community of Laurel Run destroyed

The Laurel Run mine fire is an underground mine fire near the communities of Laurel Run and Georgetown, in Luzerne County, Pennsylvania, in the United States. The fire started burning in 1915 at the Red Ash Coal Mine. Attempts to control it lasted from 1915 to 1957 and recommenced in 1966. In the 1960s, the United States government and the Pennsylvania state government became involved in containing the fire. Attempts to stop the spread of the fire were erroneously declared successful in 1973, and the fire is still burning.

== Start of the fire and early history ==
The Laurel Run mine fire began on December 6, 1915, in the Red Ash Coal Mine. A miner accidentally left a carbide lamp hanging from a timber support, which caught fire. The fire went unnoticed for the entire weekend because there was no night watchman. It was noticed when work resumed the following week; attempts were made to block off its air supply by pouring sand in the area and filling the mine openings with concrete. The mine's owners then stated that the fire was under control.

By 1921, it became evident that the mine fire had persisted and spread. The company operating the mine placed temporary barriers to stop its spread so the rest of the mine could continue to be worked. Mining in the area ended in 1957. At this point attempts to stop the spread of the fire also ceased.

== Later history ==
Over the years, the Laurel Run site became known as 'the burning mountain' because of smoke vented from a number of fissures leading to the abandoned underground works. In September 1962, residents of the nearby community of Laurel Run were forced to abandon their homes due to subsidence (due to destruction of the mine's pillars in the area) and fumes from the fire. The pillars were columns of anthracite coal left to support the ground above the mine. Legitimate miners would "rob" them through mining when they couldn't otherwise meet their coal quotas, and "outlaw" miners, not affiliated with a given mine, would subsequently rob them as well when the mines were closed. The resulting subsidence at the surface could cause dangerous sink holes. The community at this point became aware of the presence of an uncontrolled mine fire in the area.

In the early 1960s, the then governor of Pennsylvania William Scranton and the congressman Daniel J. Flood arrived at the area of the Laurel Run mine fire and called upon the Appalachian Regional Commission to aid in containing it.

By 1964, local plant life was dying out and residents of Laurel Run were experiencing adverse symptoms such as headaches. In February 1964, high levels of carbon monoxide and carbon dioxide were detected in the area, and mine gases reaching the surface gave off a blue glow at nights. On March 19, 1964, the Defense Materials, Manufacturing and Infrastructure Standing Committee announced a $1,000,000 cleanup project for the Laurel Run area. The state of Pennsylvania contributed $500,000. In 1965, evacuation of Laurel Run began in earnest, led by the Appalachian Regional Commission.

On April 23, 1966, a plan to control the mine fire was enacted. A series of boreholes were dug to determine the scope of the fire. It was found to have spread under the community of Laurel Run and also to the community of Georgetown. However, in Georgetown, the ground was relatively stable and the fire did not cause problems aboveground. Clay and sand were injected into the boreholes to contain the fire. The containment efforts occupied 800,000 square feet. Amy Randolph of the Pennsylvania Department of Environmental Protection estimated that the efforts would cost $4,000,000. This figure was later revised to $9,000,000. Meanwhile, the United States Department of Housing and Urban Development relocated 850 residents who lived over the mine fire. The area of the fire below Georgetown was controlled by blocking off the tunnels in the vicinity, robbing it of the necessary oxygen to continue burning.

In 1973, the containment of the mine fire was stated to be complete, but it continues to burn into the 21st century. The people of Laurel Run gained more government support in combating the Laurel Run mine fire than the people of Centralia did in stopping the Centralia mine fire.

== In the 21st century ==
The Earth Conservancy considered harnessing the geothermal energy of the mine fire.

In 2013, Michael Corgan, a businessman from Wilkes-Barre Township was granted permission to strip mine 40 acres of land on top of the Laurel Run mine fire, on the condition that the strip mining operations remained at least 120 feet (37 m) above the fire. Strip mining on top of a mine fire had not previously been done, although Corgan had attempted to start a strip mine in the area in 1992.

The setting of the novel Whispers from the Ashes is based on the community of Laurel Run in the early 1960s, when residents were forced to evacuate.

The Laurel Run mine fire may burn for another century.

== Geology ==
The geographical setting of the Laurel Run mine fire has been compared to that of the Centralia mine fire. The Laurel Run mine fire was located on the southern spur of the Wilkes-Barre syncline. It is part of the ridge and valley geographical province. The coal beds that are on fire are the Ross bed, the Top Red Ash bed, and the Bottom Red Ash bed. The coal beds dip 10 or 15 degrees to the north. The Llewellyn Formation is situated on top of the Red Ash bed and the Pottsville Conglomerate is situated below it.

Due to the geographical features of the area, the mine fire is only able to spread to the northeast, northwest, and southwest.

In some areas in the vicinity of the fire, the ground has cracked open. However, the surface temperature is not as hot as the Centralia mine fire. The mine fire is 200 feet (60 m) to 300 feet (90 m) underground and burns at a temperature of around 1,000 °F (540 °C).

== See also ==
- Carbondale mine fire
- Centralia mine fire
- New Straitsville mine fire
- Vanderbilt, Pennsylvania
