= Centralia mine fire =

Long-burning coal-seam fire in Pennsylvania, US

Coordinates: 40°48′04″N 76°20′15″W

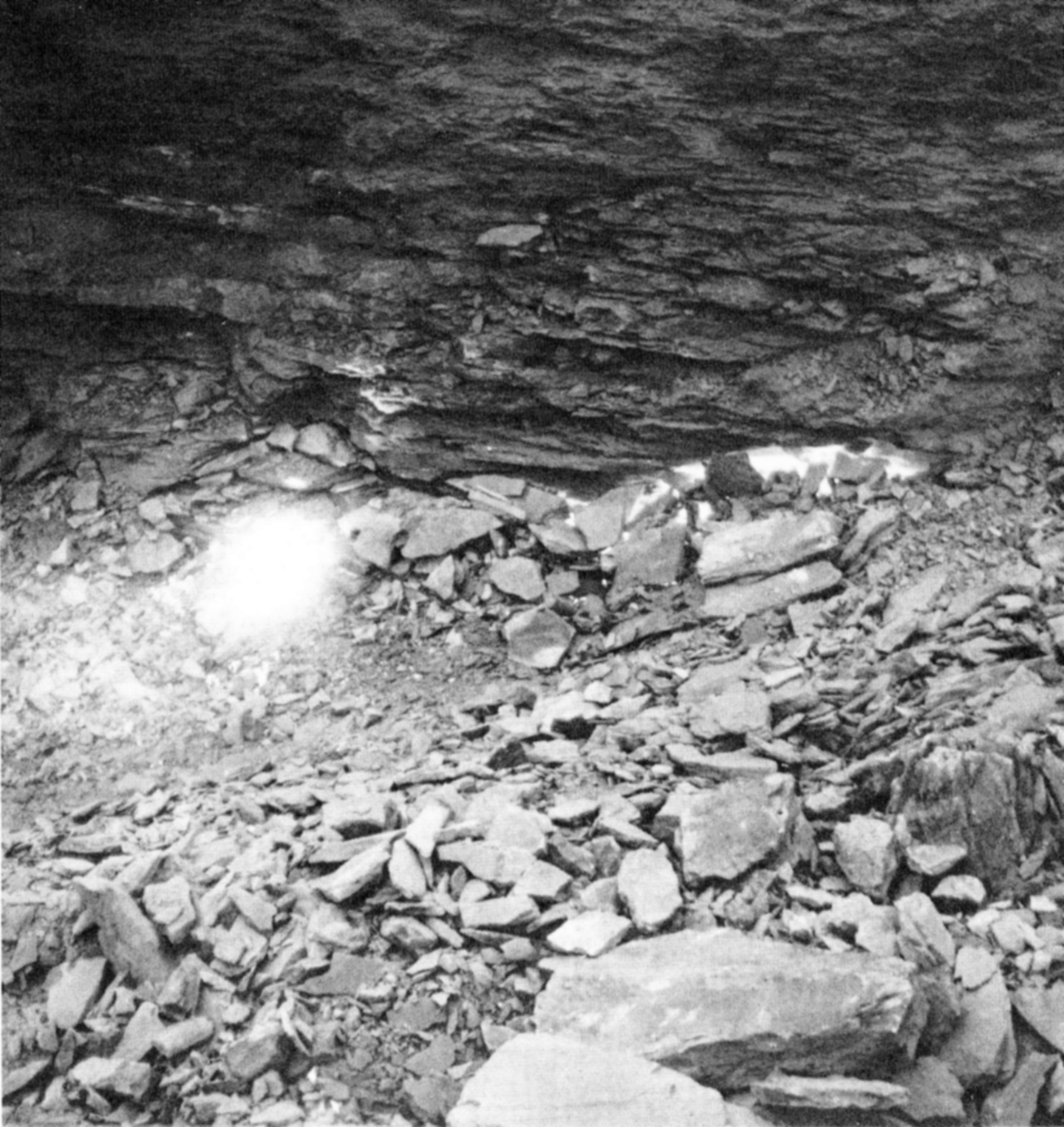
A small part of the Centralia mine fire after being exposed during excavation in 1969

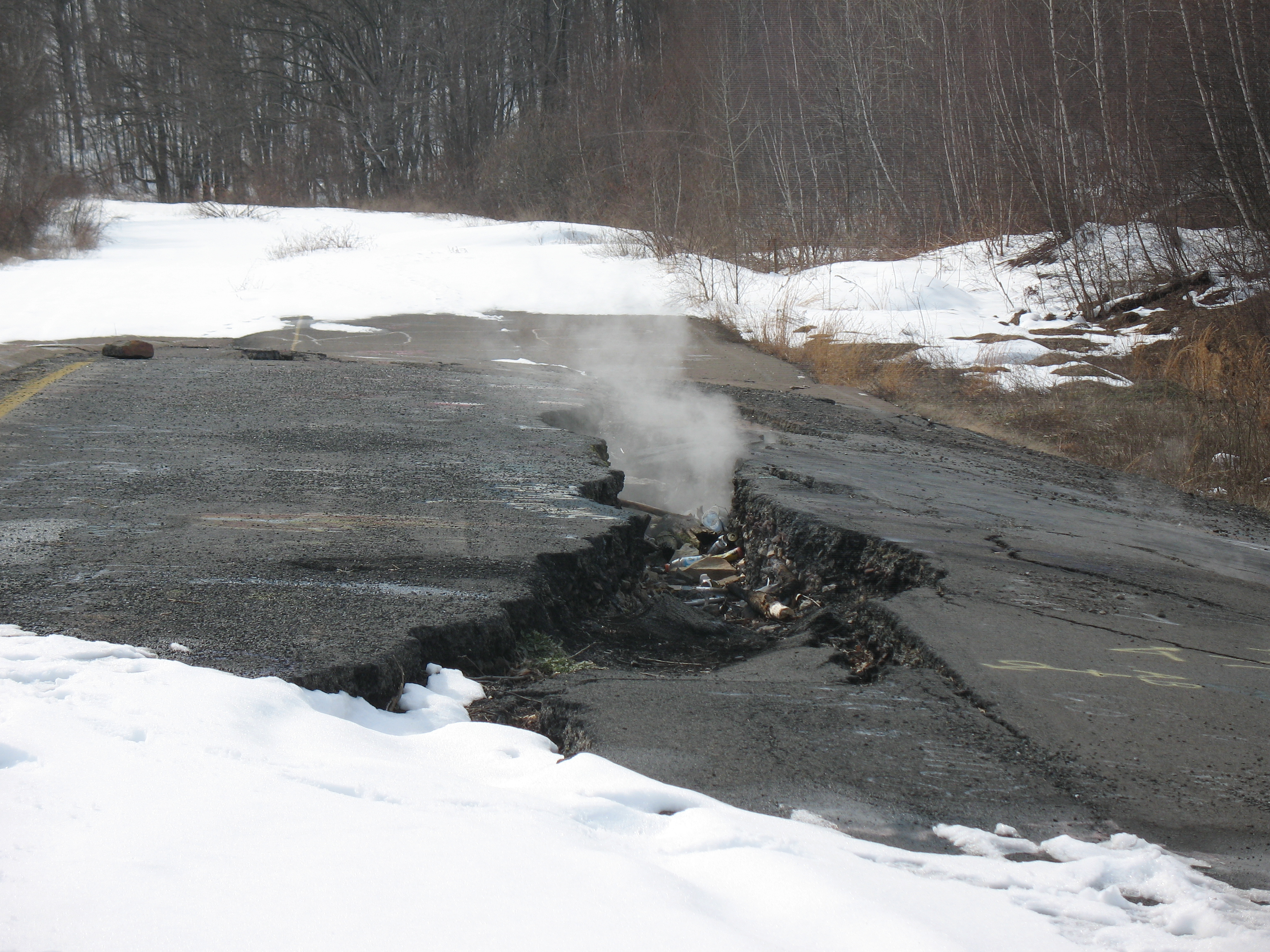
Steam rising through a fissure in the ground in the closed-off area of former Pennsylvania Route 61 in 2010. The melted snow shows areas where heat is escaping from the ground below.

The Centralia mine fire is a coal-seam fire that has been burning in the labyrinth of abandoned coal mines underneath the borough of Centralia, Pennsylvania, since at least May 27, 1962. Its original cause and start date are still a matter of debate. It is burning at depths of up to 300 feet (90 m) over an 8-mile (13 km) stretch of 3,700 acres (15 km^{2}). At its current rate, it could continue to burn for over 250 years. Due to the fire, Centralia was mostly abandoned in the 1980s. There were 1,500 residents at the time the fire is believed to have started, but as of 2024, Centralia has a population of one and most of the buildings have been demolished.

== Background ==
On May 7, 1962, the Centralia Council met to discuss the approaching Memorial Day and how the town would go about cleaning up the Centralia landfill, which was introduced earlier that year. The 300-foot-wide, 75-foot-long (91 m × 23 m) pit was made up of a 50-foot-deep (15 m) strip mine that had been cleared by Edward Whitney in 1935, and came very close to the northeast corner of Odd Fellows Cemetery. There were eight illegal dumps spread about Centralia, and the council's intention in creating the landfill in one of the abandoned mine pits was to stop the illegal dumping, as new state regulations had forced the town to close an earlier dump west of St. Ignatius Cemetery. Trustees at the cemetery were opposed to the landfill's proximity to it but recognized the illegal dumping elsewhere was a serious problem and envisioned that the new pit would resolve it.

Pennsylvania had passed a precautionary law in 1956 to regulate landfill use in strip mines, as landfills were known to cause destructive mine fires. The law required a permit and regular inspection for a municipality to use such a pit. George Segaritus, a regional landfill inspector who worked for the Department of Mines and Mineral Industries (DMMI) became concerned about the pit when he noticed holes in the walls and floor, as such mines often cut through older mines underneath. Segaritus informed Joseph Tighe, a Centralia councilman, that the pit would require filling with a non-combustible material.

== Fire ==
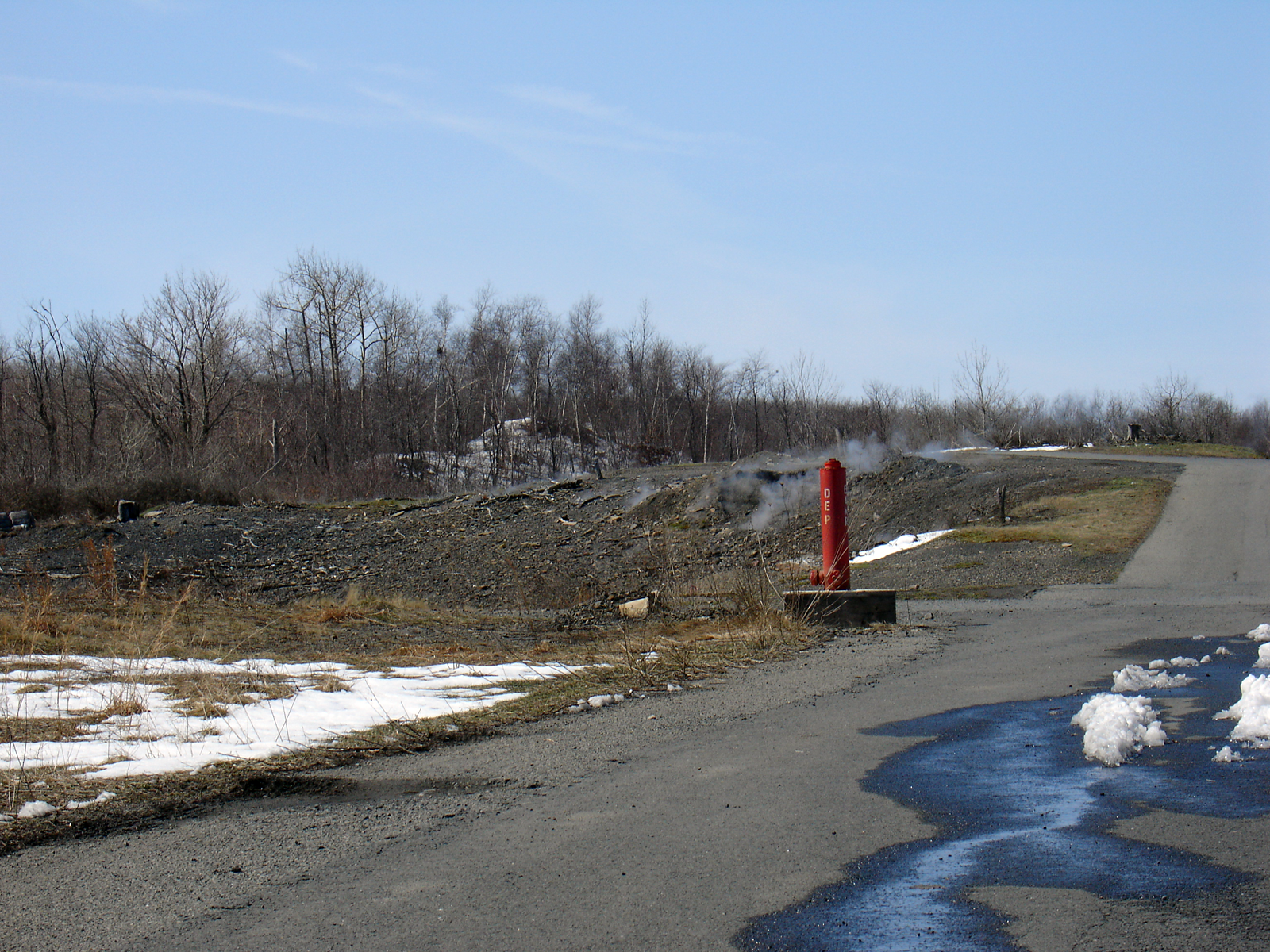
The Buck Vein Outcrop

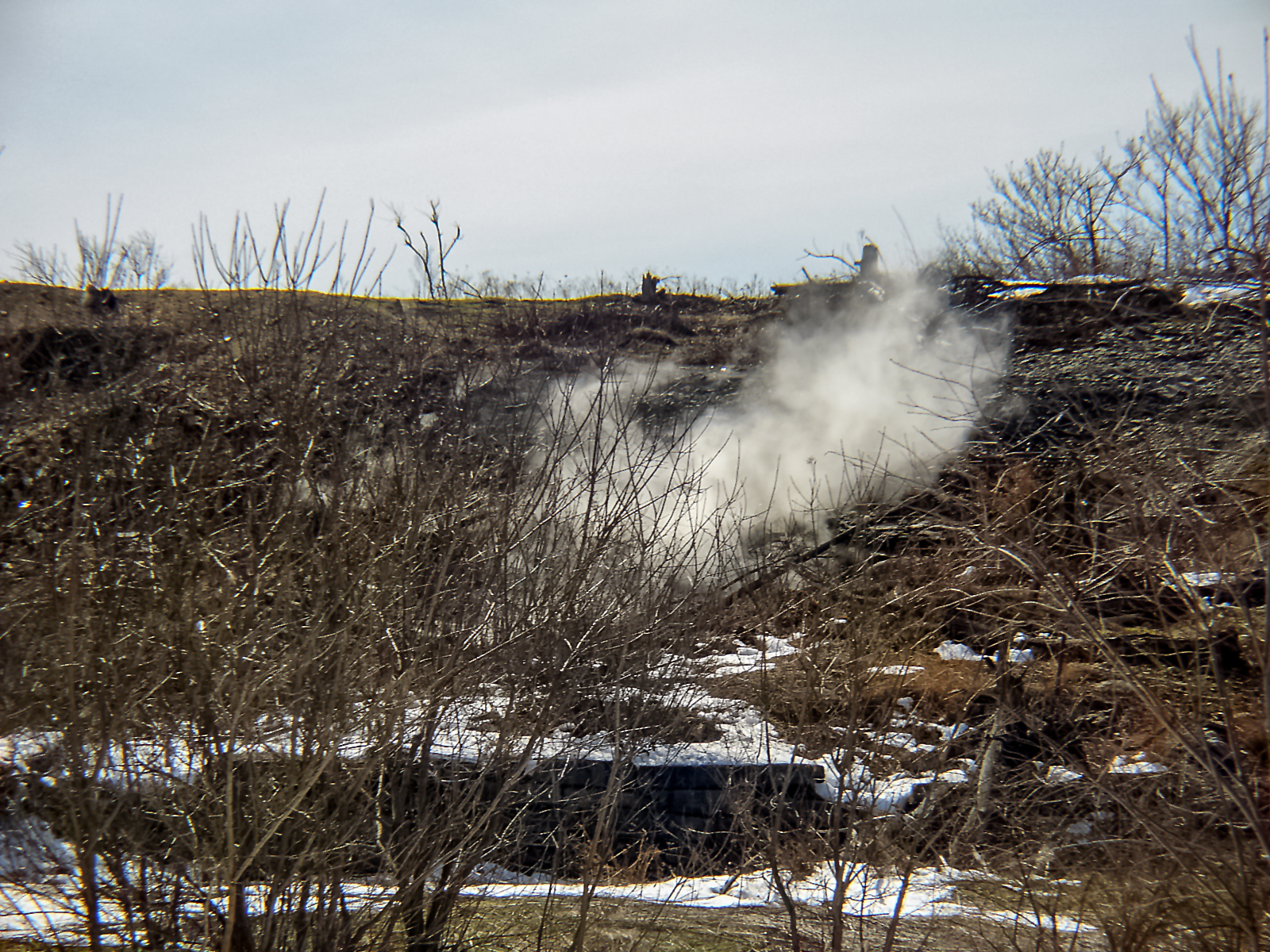
A plume of steam wafts from the ground.

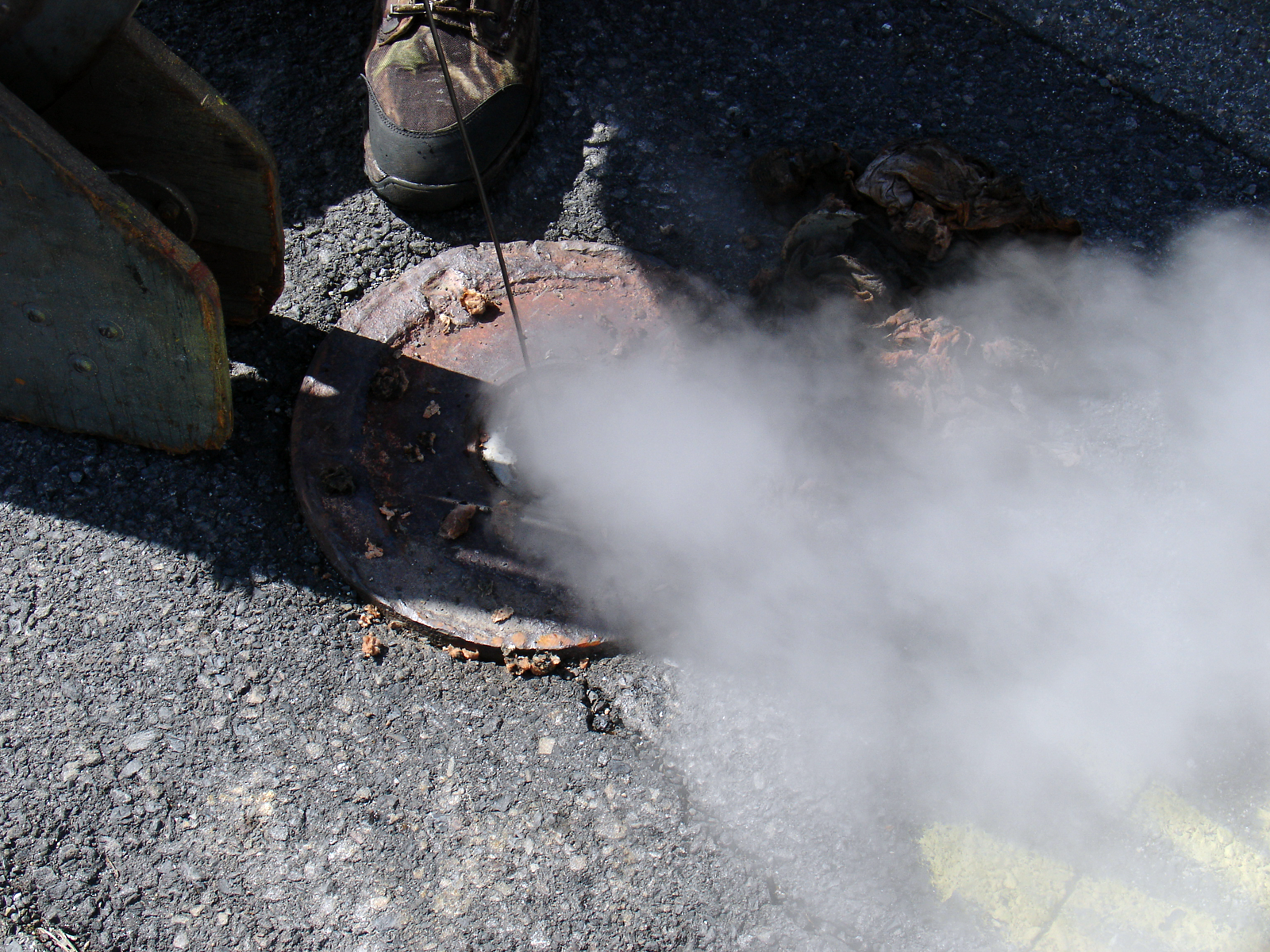
A DEP monitoring hole

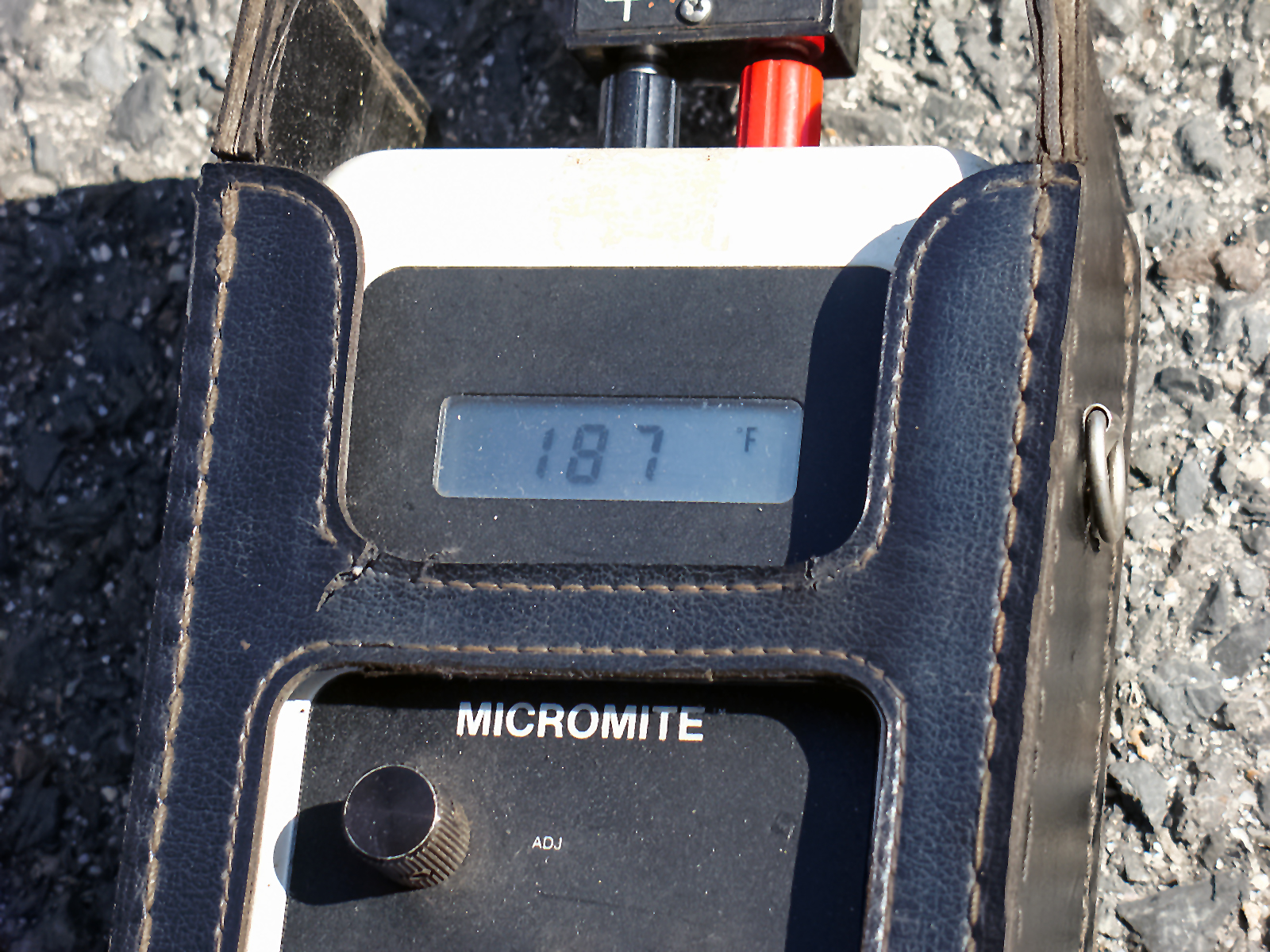
A DEP underground reading of 187 °F (86 °C)

This was a world where no human could live, hotter than the planet Mercury, its atmosphere as poisonous as Saturn's. At the heart of the fire, temperatures easily exceeded 1,000 degrees Fahrenheit [540 degrees Celsius]. Lethal clouds of carbon monoxide and other gases swirled through the rock chambers.

— David DeKok, Unseen Danger: A Tragedy of People, Government, and the Centralia Mine Fire (University of Pennsylvania Press, 1986)

=== Plan and execution ===
The town council arranged for cleanup of the strip mine dump, but council minutes do not describe the proposed procedure. DeKok surmises that the process—setting it on fire—was not specified because state law prohibited dump fires. Nonetheless, the Centralia council set a date and hired five members of the volunteer firefighter company to clean up the landfill.

A fire was ignited to clean the dump on May 27, 1962, and water was used to douse the visible flames that night. However, flames were seen once more on May 29. Using hoses hooked up from Locust Avenue, another attempt was made to douse the fire that night. Another flare-up in the following week (June 4) caused the Centralia Fire Company to once again douse it with hoses. A bulldozer stirred up the garbage so that firemen could douse concealed layers of the burning waste. A few days later, a hole as wide as 15 ft (4.6 m) and several feet high was found in the base of the north wall of the pit. Garbage had concealed the hole and prevented it from being filled with non-combustible material. It is possible that this hole led to the mine fire, as it provided a pathway to the labyrinth of old mines under the borough. Evidence indicates that, despite these efforts to douse the fire, the landfill continued to burn. On July 2, Monsignor William J. Burke complained about foul odors from the smoldering trash and coal reaching St. Ignatius Church. Even then, the Centralia council still allowed the dumping of garbage into the pit.

Clarence "Mooch" Kashner, the president of the Independent Miners, Breakermen, and Truckers union, came at the invitation of a council member to inspect the situation in Centralia. Kashner evaluated the events and called Gordon Smith, an engineer of the Department of Mines and Mineral Industries (DMMI) office in Pottsville. Smith told the town that he could dig out the smoldering material using a steam shovel for $175 ($1,863 in 2025). A call was placed to Art Joyce, a mine inspector from Mount Carmel, who brought gas detection equipment for use on the swirling wisps of steam now emanating from ground fissures in the north wall of the landfill pit. Tests concluded that the gases seeping from the large hole in the pit wall and from cracks in the north wall contained carbon monoxide concentrations typical of coal-mine fires.

=== Escalation ===
The Centralia Council sent a letter to the Lehigh Valley Coal Company (LVCC) as formal notice of the fire. It is speculated that the town council had decided that hiding the true origin of the fire would serve better than alerting the LVCC of the truth, which would most likely end in receiving no help from them. In the letter, the borough described the starting of a fire "of unknown origin during a period of unusually hot weather".

Preceding an August 6 meeting at the fire site, which would include officials from the LVCC and the Susquehanna Coal Company, Deputy Secretary of Mines James Shober Sr. expected that the representatives would inform him that they could not afford mounting a project that would stop the mine fire. Therefore, Shober announced that he expected the state to finance the cost of digging out the fire, which was at that time around $30,000 (roughly equivalent to $319,000 in 2025). Another offer was made at the meeting, proposed by Centralia strip mine operator Alonzo Sanchez, who told members of council that he would dig out the mine fire free of charge as long as he could claim any coal he recovered without paying royalties to the Lehigh Valley Coal Company. Part of Sanchez's plan was to do exploratory drilling to estimate the scope of the mine fire, which was most likely why Sanchez's offer was rejected at the meeting. The drilling would have delayed the project, not to mention the legal problems with mining rights.

At the time, state mine inspectors were in the Centralia-area mines almost daily to check for lethal levels of carbon monoxide. Lethal levels were found on August 9, and all Centralia-area mines were closed the next day.

== Early remediation attempts ==
=== First excavation project ===
Pressed at an August 12 meeting of the United Mine Works of America in Centralia, Secretary of Mines Lewis Evans sent a letter to the group on August 15 that claimed he had authorized a project to deal with the mine fire, and that bids for the project would be opened on August 17. Two days later, the contract was awarded to Bridy, Inc., a company near Mount Carmel, for an estimated $20,000 (roughly equivalent to $213,000 in 2025). Work on the project began August 22.

The Department of Mines and Mineral Industries (DMMI), who originally believed Bridy would need only to excavate 24,000 cu yd (18,000 m^{3}) of earth, informed them that they were forbidden from doing any exploratory drilling in order to find the perimeter of the fire or how deep it was, and that they were to strictly follow plans drawn up by DMMI engineers Bill Taby and Gordon Smith who did not believe that the fire was particularly large or active. Instead, the size and location of the fire was estimated based on the amount of steam issuing from the landfill rock.

Bridy, following the engineering team plan, began by digging on the northern perimeter of the dump pit rim and excavated about 200 ft (61 m) outward to expand the perimeter. However, the project was ultimately ineffective due to multiple factors. Intentional breaching of the subterranean mine chambers allowed large amounts of oxygen to rush in, greatly worsening the fire. Steve Kisela, a bulldozer operator in Bridy's project, said that the project was ineffective because the inrush of air helped the fire to move ahead of the excavation point by the time the section was drilled and blasted. Bridy was also using a 2.5 cu yd (1.9 m^{3}) shovel, which was considered small for the project.

Furthermore, the state only permitted Bridy's team to work weekday shifts which were eight hours long and only occurred during the day time, commonly referred to as "first shift" in the mining industry. At one point, work was at a standstill for five days during the Labor Day weekend in early September. Finally, the fire was traveling in a northward direction, which caused the fire to move deeper into the coal seam. This, combined with the work restrictions and inadequate equipment, greatly increased the excavation cost. Bridy had excavated 58,580 cu yd (44,790 m^{3}) of earth by the time the project ran out of money and ended on October 29, 1962.

=== Second excavation project ===
On October 29, 1962, just prior to the termination of the Bridy project, a new project was proposed that involved flushing the mine fire. Crushed rock would be mixed with water and pumped into Centralia's mines ahead of the expected fire expansion. The project was estimated to cost $40,000 (roughly equivalent to $426,000 in 2025). Bids were opened on November 1, 1962 and the project was awarded to K&H Excavating with a low bid of $28,400 (roughly equivalent to $302,000 in 2025).

Drilling was conducted through holes spaced 20 ft (6.1 m) apart in a semicircular pattern along the edge of the landfill. However, this project was also ineffective due to multiple factors. Centralia experienced an unusually heavy period of snowfall and unseasonably low temperatures during the project. Winter weather caused the water supply lines to freeze in 1962. Furthermore, the rock-grinding machine froze during a windy blizzard. Both problems inhibited the timely mixture and administration of the crushed-rock slurry. The DMMI also worried that the 10,000 cu yd (7,600 m^{3}) of flushing material would not be enough to fill the mines, thus preventing the bore holes from filling completely. Partially filled boreholes would provide an escape route for the fire, rendering the project ineffective.

These problems quickly depleted funds. In response, Secretary Evans approved an additional $14,000 (roughly equivalent to $149,000 in 2025) to fund this project. Funding for the project ran out on March 15, 1963, with a total cost of $42,420 (roughly equivalent to $452,000 in 2025).

On April 11, 1963, steam issuing from additional openings in the ground indicated that the fire had spread eastward as far as 700 ft (210 m), and that the project had failed.

=== Third project ===
A three-option proposal was drawn up soon after that, although the project would be delayed until after the new fiscal year beginning July 1, 1963. The first option, costing $277,490, consisted of entrenching the fire and back-filling the trench with incombustible material. The second, costing $151,714, offered a smaller trench in an incomplete circle, followed by the completion of the circle with a flush barrier. The third plan was a "total and concerted flushing project" larger than the second project's flushing and costing $82,300. The state abandoned this project in 1963.

== Later remediation projects ==
David DeKok began reporting on the mine fire for The News-Item in Shamokin beginning in late 1976. Between 1976 and 1986, he wrote over 500 articles about the mine fire. In 1979, locals became aware of the scale of the problem when a gas-station owner, then-mayor John Coddington, inserted a dipstick into one of his underground tanks to check the fuel level. When he withdrew it, it seemed hot. He lowered a thermometer into the tank on a string and was shocked to discover that the temperature of the gasoline in the tank was 172 °F (77.8 °C).

Beginning in 1980, adverse health effects were reported by several people due to byproducts of the fire—carbon monoxide and carbon dioxide—and low oxygen levels. Statewide attention to the fire began to increase, culminating in 1981 when a 12-year-old resident named Todd Domboski fell into a sinkhole 4 ft (1.2 m) wide by 150 ft (46 m) deep that suddenly opened beneath his feet in a backyard. He clung to a tree root until his cousin, 14-year-old Eric Wolfgang, saved his life by pulling him out of the hole. The plume of hot steam billowing from the hole was measured as containing a lethal level of carbon monoxide. Todd began suffering nightmares of the incident from post-traumatic stress disorder later in life, for which he turned to prescribed medication. He died of an overdose on February 4, 2022.

== Possible origins ==
A number of competing hypotheses have arisen about the source of the Centralia mine fire. Some of them claim that the mine fire started before May 27, 1962. David DeKok says that the borough's deliberate burning of trash on May 27 to clean up the landfill in the former strip mine ignited a coal seam via an unsealed opening in the trash pit, which allowed the fire to enter the labyrinth of abandoned coal mines beneath Centralia.

Joan Quigley argues in her 2007 book The Day the Earth Caved In that the fire had in fact started the previous day, when a trash hauler dumped hot ash or coal discarded from coal burners into the open trash pit. She noted that borough council minutes from June 4, 1962, referred to two fires at the dump, and that five firefighters had submitted bills for "fighting the fire at the landfill area". The borough, by law, was responsible for installing a fire-resistant clay barrier between each layer of trash in the landfill, but fell behind schedule, leaving the barrier incomplete. This allowed the hot coals to penetrate the vein of coal underneath the pit, lighting the subsequent subterranean fire. In addition to the council minutes, Quigley cites "interviews with volunteer firemen, the former fire chief, borough officials, and several eyewitnesses" as her sources.

Another hypothesis is that the fire was burning long before the alleged trash dump fire. According to local legend, the Bast Colliery coal fire of 1932, set alight by an explosion, was never fully extinguished. In 1962, it reached the landfill area. Those who adhere to the Bast Theory believe that the dump fire is a separate fire unrelated to the Centralia mine fire. One man who disagrees is Frank Jurgill Sr., who claims he operated a bootleg mine with his brother in the vicinity of the landfill between 1960 and 1962. He says that if the Bast Colliery fire had never been put out, he and his brother would have been in it and been killed by the gases.

Centralia councilman Joseph Tighe proposed a different hypothesis: that Centralia's coal fire was actually started by an adjacent coal-seam fire that had been burning west of Centralia's. His belief is that the adjacent fire was at one time partially excavated, but nonetheless, it set alight the landfill on May 27.

Another hypothesis arose from a letter sent to the Lehigh Valley Coal Company by the Centralia Council in the days after the mine fire was noticed. The letter describes "a fire of unknown origin [starting] on or about June 25, 1962, during a period of unusually hot weather". This may refer to the hypothesis of spontaneous combustion being the reason for the start of the landfill fire, a hypothesis accepted for many years by state and federal officials.

== Aftermath ==
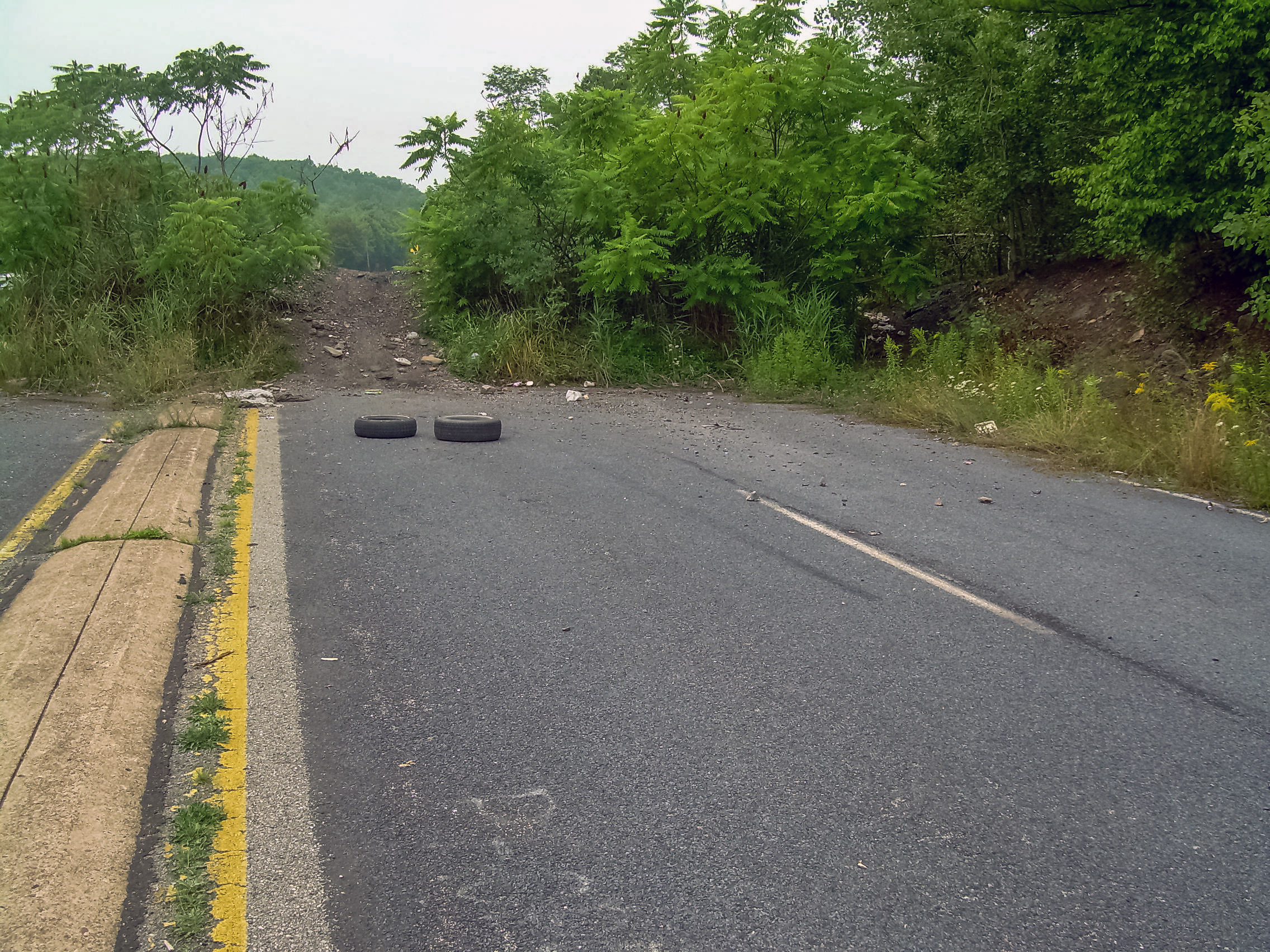
The location at which the former roadbed of Pennsylvania Route 61 terminates due to the mine fire

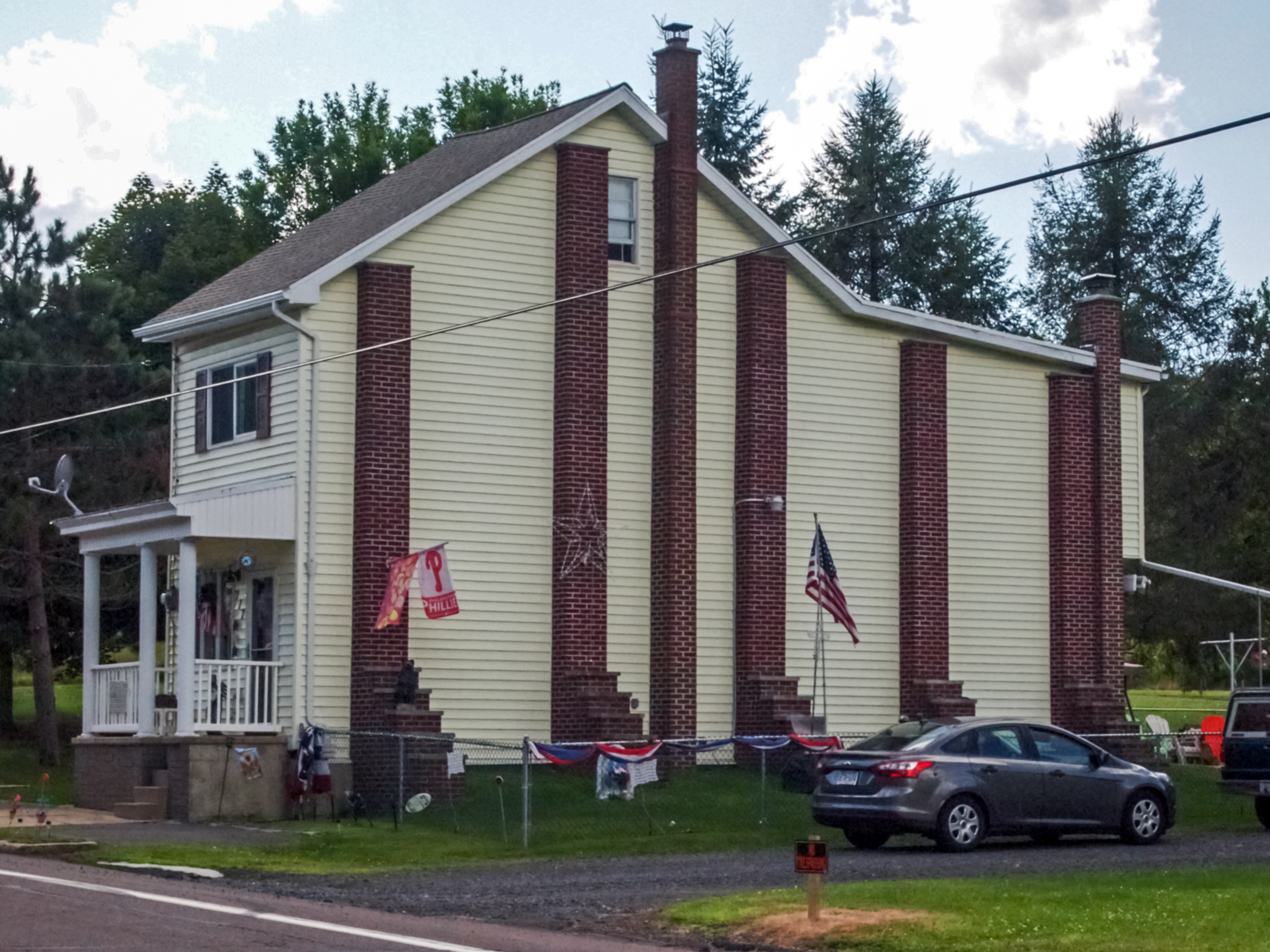
As the joining row houses were demolished, buttresses were constructed to support the walls of the remaining homes.

In 1984, Wilkes-Barre Representative Frank Harrison proposed legislation, which was approved by Congress, that allocated more than $42 million for relocation efforts (equivalent to $130 million in 2025) Most of the residents accepted buyout offers. A few families opted to stay despite urgings from Pennsylvania officials.

In 1992, Pennsylvania governor Bob Casey invoked eminent domain on all properties in the borough, condemning all the buildings within. A subsequent legal effort by residents to have the decision reversed failed. In 2002, the U.S. Postal Service revoked Centralia's ZIP code, 17927.

In 2009, Governor Ed Rendell began the formal eviction of Centralia residents. By early 2010, only five occupied homes remained, with the residents determined to stay. In lawsuits, the remaining residents alleged that they were victims of "massive fraud", "motivated primarily by interests in what is conservatively estimated at hundreds of millions of dollars of some of the best anthracite coal in the world". In July 2012, the last handful of residents in Centralia lost their appeal of a court decision upholding eminent domain proceedings and were again ordered to leave. State and local officials reached an agreement with the seven remaining residents on October 29, 2013, allowing them to live out their lives there, after which the rights of their properties would be taken through eminent domain.

The Centralia mine fire also extended beneath the town of Byrnesville, a few miles to the south. The town had to be abandoned and leveled.

The Centralia area has now grown to be a tourist attraction. Visitors come to see the smoke and/or steam on Centralia's empty streets and the abandoned portion of PA Route 61, popularly referred to as the Graffiti Highway.

As of April 2020, efforts to cover up Graffiti Highway by the private owner of the road were begun. The abandoned highway was covered with dirt in April 2020, generally blocking public access to the road.

Increased air pressure induced by the heat from the mine fires has interacted with heavy rainfalls in the area, which rush into the abandoned mines to form Pennsylvania's only geyser, the Big Mine Run Geyser, which erupts on private property in nearby Ashland. The geyser has been kept open as a means of flood control.

The fire and its effects were featured in 2013 on America Declassified on the Travel Channel, on Radiolab's Cities episode, and on 99% Invisible's Mini Stories: Volume 18 episode.

== See also ==
- Carbondale mine fire
- Darvaza gas crater
- Jharia coal field fire
- Laurel Run mine fire
- New Straitsville mine fire
