= Carbondale, Pennsylvania =

City in Pennsylvania, US

- City
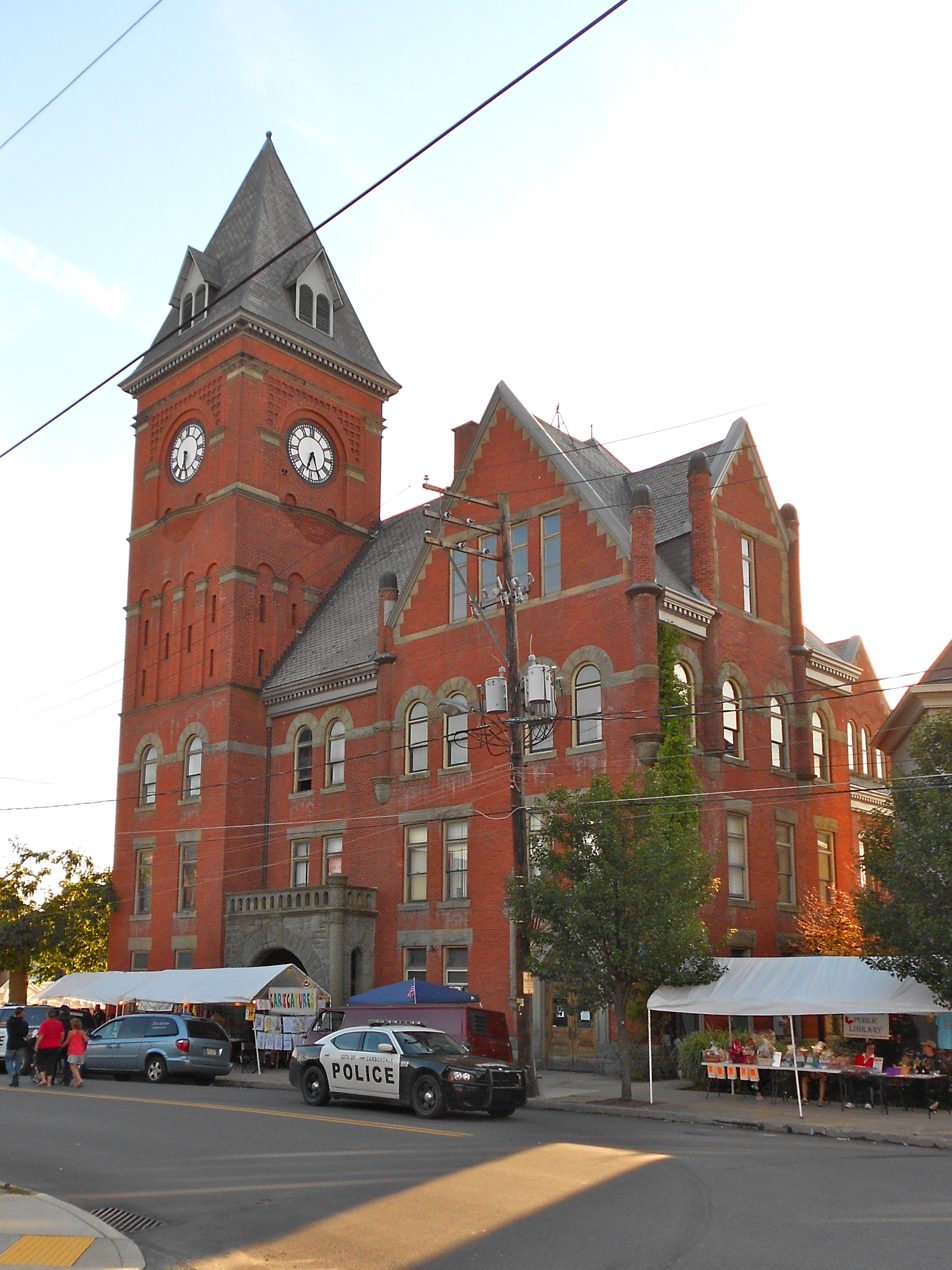
- Carbondale City Hall and Courthouse

- Logo
- Nickname: The Pioneer City
- Location of Carbondale in Lackawanna County, Pennsylvania

- Location of Carbondale in Pennsylvania Carbondale (the United States)
- Coordinates: 41°34′N 75°30′W
- Country: United States
- State: Pennsylvania
- County: Lackawanna
- Established: 1824
- Incorporated: March 15, 1851

Government
  - Mayor: Michele Bannon (D)

Area
  - Total: 3.24 sq mi (8.40 km^{2})
  - Land: 3.24 sq mi (8.40 km^{2})
  - Water: 0 sq mi (0.00 km^{2})
- Elevation: 1,043 ft (318 m)

Population (2020)
  - Total: 8,828
  - Density: 2,722.2/sq mi (1,051.04/km^{2})
- Time zone: UTC-5 (EST)
  - Summer (DST): UTC-4 (EDT)
- ZIP Code: 18407
- Area code: 570
- FIPS code: 42-11232
- GNIS feature ID: 1215315
- Website: www.carbondalepa.org

Carbondale is a city in Lackawanna County, Pennsylvania, United States. Carbondale is located approximately 15 miles due northeast of the city of Scranton in Northeastern Pennsylvania. The population was 8,828 at the 2020 census.

The land area that became Carbondale was developed by William and Maurice Wurts, the founders of the Delaware and Hudson Canal Company, during the rise of the anthracite coal mining industry in the early 19th century. It was also a major terminal of the Delaware and Hudson Railroad. Carbondale was the site of the first deep vein anthracite coal mine in the United States, and was the site of the Carbondale mine fire which burned from 1946 to the early 1970s.

Carbondale has struggled with the demise of the once-prominent coal mining industry that had once made the region a haven for immigrants seeking work. Immigrants from Wales, England, Scotland, Ireland, Italy and from continental Europe came to Carbondale in the 19th and early 20th centuries to work in the anthracite and railroading industries.

Carbondale is 92.2 miles (148.4 km) north of Allentown and 130.8 miles (210.5 km) northwest of New York City.

== Geography ==
According to the U.S. Census Bureau, Carbondale has a total area of 3.2 square miles (8.3 km^{2}), all land.

== Demographics ==
Historical population
Census	Pop.	Note	%±
1840	2,398		—
1850	4,945		106.2%
1860	5,090		2.9%
1870	6,393		25.6%
1880	7,714		20.7%
1890	10,833		40.4%
1900	13,536		25.0%
1910	17,040		25.9%
1920	18,640		9.4%
1930	20,061		7.6%
1940	19,371		−3.4%
1950	16,296		−15.9%
1960	13,595		−16.6%
1970	12,478		−8.2%
1980	11,255		−9.8%
1990	10,664		−5.3%
2000	9,804		−8.1%
2010	8,891		−9.3%
2020	8,828		−0.7%

=== 2020 census ===
As of the 2020 census, Carbondale had a population of 8,828 at a density of 2,758.8 people per square mile. The median age was 41.3 years, 22.0% of residents were under the age of 18, and 20.8% were 65 years of age or older. For every 100 females there were 93.9 males, and for every 100 females age 18 and over there were 88.7 males age 18 and over.

99.3% of residents lived in urban areas, while 0.7% lived in rural areas.

There were 3,735 households in Carbondale, of which 26.8% had children under the age of 18 living in them. Of all households, 32.7% were married-couple households, 23.2% were households with a male householder and no spouse or partner present, and 35.8% were households with a female householder and no spouse or partner present. About 35.9% of all households were made up of individuals, 17.2% had someone living alone who was 65 years of age or older, and the average family size was 2.65.

There were 4,214 housing units, of which 11.4% were vacant. The homeowner vacancy rate was 3.1% and the rental vacancy rate was 6.3%. The housing units averaged 1,317 per square mile.

Racial composition as of the 2020 census
Race	Number	Percent
White	7,748	87.8%
Black or African American	198	2.2%
American Indian and Alaska Native	24	0.3%
Asian	45	0.5%
Native Hawaiian and Other Pacific Islander	0	0.0%
Some other race	263	3.0%
Two or more races	550	6.2%
Hispanic or Latino (of any race)	637	7.2%

=== Income and poverty ===
The median income for a household in the city was $42,618, and the median income for a family was $55,043. About 24.8% of the population were below the poverty threshold, including 46.7% of those under age 18 and 15.7% of those age 65 or over.

== History ==
The Carbondale Historical Society and Museum records and maintains the city's history. The Carbondale City Hall and Courthouse was added to the National Register of Historic Places in 1983. The Delaware and Hudson Canal Gravity Railroad Shops have been demolished, but were once listed on the National Register of Historic Places.

The Carbondale mine fire began in Carbondale in 1946. Every census since 1940 has seen a steady decline in the population of Carbondale, mostly attributed to the end of the coal industry in the area.

=== Notable firsts ===
- 1829: the Delaware and Hudson Gravity Railroad from Carbondale to Honesdale began operations on October 9, 1829.
- 1833: the first Saint Patrick's Day parade in what is now Lackawanna County is held in Carbondale, as stated in the Scranton Times-Tribune: "It comes as no surprise that the Irish people of Carbondale would want to celebrate the patron saint of their homeland. ... The Feb. 28, 1833, issue of the Northern Pennsylvanian, the first newspaper published in Carbondale, contained a notice to “Hibernians” of a public meeting to be held ... ‘for the purpose of taking measures to celebrate St. Patrick’s Day.’ ... The Carbondale parade is the first one mentioned in any history of the region that is now Lackawanna County."
- 1850: the first eisteddfod (a Welsh musical and literary festival) in America was held in Carbondale on Christmas Day, 1850. Among the authors and musicians who attended were Daniel Davies, the Rev. John Moses, Thomas Eynon, the Rev. Thomas J. Phillips, and Edward Jones. These were the pioneer attendees of America.
- 1851: Carbondale was incorporated as a city in Luzerne County on March 15, 1851, making it the oldest city (the "Pioneer" city) in what later became Lackawanna County, and the fourth oldest city in the Commonwealth of Pennsylvania
- 1853: the first lodge in America of the ancient Welsh Philanthropic Order of True Ivorites was opened in Carbondale in the fall of 1853; the first public Ivorite celebration in America took place in Carbondale in August 1855, when a procession and other public exercises took place, under the direction of Thomas Voyle, Esquire, chief marshal, and Edward Roberts, Esquire.

== Notable people ==
- James Archbald, born 1793, first mayor of Carbondale
- Patrick De Lacey, born 1835, earned Medal of Honor during American Civil War Battle of the Wilderness
- William J. Goebel, Democratic politician and 34th Governor of Kentucky
- Jonathan "EliGE" Jablonowski, born 1997, professional gamer
- Robert Wood Johnson I, entrepreneur and industrialist who founded Johnson & Johnson
- Jerome F. O'Malley, U.S. Air Force four-star general
- Terry Pegula, owner of the Buffalo Bills NFL, Buffalo Sabres NHL, and Rochester Americans AHL; also a natural gas businessman
- Terence V. Powderly, leader of the Knights of Labor from 1879 to 1893; twice elected Mayor of Scranton, Pennsylvania.
- Fannie Ruth Robinson (born 1847), author and educator
- Joseph R. Sarnoski, Medal of Honor recipient (World War II)
- Andy Seigle, professional basketball player for the Philippine Basketball Association
- Danny Seigle, professional basketball player for the San Miguel Beermen of the Philippine Basketball Association
- William Henry Stanton (1843–1900), U.S. Congressman for Pennsylvania's 12th congressional district
- George D. Stoddard, born in 1897, president of the University of Illinois and University of the State of New York; chancellor of New York University and Long Island University
- Ed Wade, born 1956, vice president and general manager of the Philadelphia Phillies, 1998–2005 and Houston Astros, 2008–2011

== Transportation ==
=== Highway ===
U.S. Route 6 Business runs along Main Street through Carbondale. The four-lane Robert P. Casey Highway (U.S. Route 6) runs from Interstate 81 near Scranton to Carbondale, with interchanges serving the area.

=== Rail ===
As the city responsible for the importation of America's first steam locomotive, the Stourbridge Lion in 1829, Carbondale was once a main terminus of the Delaware and Hudson Railway. It was also served by the Erie Railroad and the New York, Ontario and Western Railway.

Today Carbondale is served by the Pennsylvania Northeast Regional Railroad Authority and its designated-operator Delaware-Lackawanna Railroad on a single remaining D&H mainline track running to Scranton, now called the Carbondale Mainline.

Steamtown National Historic Site on occasion provides excursion trains originating from the Scranton Yard to the Carbondale Station for special events.

=== Bus ===
Carbondale is served by the County of Lackawanna Transit System (COLTS).

== Local transportation ==
Carbondale is served by the #52 and #82 lines, run by COLTS bus.

== Media ==
WCDL-AM 1440 has served the area since 1950. Co-owned WTRW broadcasts on 94.3 FM.

== In popular culture ==
- The 2010 film Blue Valentine was filmed, in part, in Carbondale.
- Carbondale was mentioned briefly in The Office Season 2 Episode 2, The Injury, of when temporary worker Ryan Howard informed Regional Manager Michael Scott that "No, the gas station in Carbondale did not have fresh yams." The Season 6 character Isabel Poreba also hails from Carbondale.
- Dr. Susan Weiss Liebman wrote “The Dressmaker’s Mirror: Sudden Death, Genetics, and a Jewish Family’s Secret,” about a genetic mutation in her family. The establishing event referenced in the book's title is her uncle's death at age four from heart failure in Carbondale.

== See also ==
- Hendrick Manufacturing Company
