= Delaware and Hudson Canal Gravity Railroad Shops =

- Formerly listed on the U.S. National Register of Historic Places
- Location: 91 N. Main St., Carbondale, Pennsylvania
- Area: 1 acre (0.40 ha)
- Built: 1858
- NRHP reference No.: 78002409

Significant dates
- Added to NRHP: November 30, 1978
- Removed from NRHP: September 15, 1987

Delaware and Hudson Canal Gravity Railroad Shops was a historic gravity railroad maintenance facility located at Carbondale, Lackawanna County, Pennsylvania. They were built as part of the Delaware and Hudson Gravity Railroad.

It was added to the National Register of Historic Places in 1978. It was delisted in 1987, after being demolished.
