= Carbondale mine fire =

Coal seam fire in Pennsylvania, US

Coordinates: 41.573°N 75.508°W

The Carbondale mine fire was a mine fire in the West Side neighborhood of Carbondale, Lackawanna County, Pennsylvania, in the United States. The fire started in 1946, but was eventually contained by the 1970s. However, it caused at least two fatalities and millions of dollars of property damage.

== Site description ==
The Carbondale mine fire was located in the Coal Region of Pennsylvania. It was in the vicinity of an apartment complex consisting of eleven three-story buildings. The dump where the fire started was in former strip mine pits of the Hudson Coal Company's Powderly Mine. The pits had dirt and outcroppings of rock containing hidden coal.

The Carbondale mine fire spread considerably faster than the Centralia mine fire in Columbia County, Pennsylvania, but was somewhat smaller.

Unlike many mine fires, the Carbondale mine fire lacked "noxious odors". There are, however, irregular snowmelts in the area, which is typical of mine fires.

32 of the boreholes installed by the Office of Surface Mining in 1986 have 6-inch internal diameter casings and the remaining two have 4 inch casings.

== Physical and geological description ==
There are at least six coal seams in the vicinity of the Carbondale Mine fire. The major seams in the area include the Grassy seam, the New County seam, the Clark seam, the Dunmore Seam #1, the Dunmore Seam #2, and the Dunmore Seam #3.

The temperature of the coal in the Carbondale mine fire ranges from 50 °C (122 °F) to 290 °C (554 °F).

The carbon monoxide concentration of the Carbondale mine fire ranges from nearly 0% to approximately 0.4%. The concentration of methane can be as high as 500 parts per million, although this represents the extreme case, and the average is much lower.

By the mid-1950s, the Carbondale mine fire occupied an area of 120 acres and burned as far down as 100 feet (30 m). The top 40 feet (12 m) in the area of the fire consisted of rock and wash. Below this, there were five or six coal seams ranging from 3 to 8 feet (0.91 to 2.44 m) thick and interspersed with layers of slate and sand. The temperature of the fire was as high as 750 to 900 °F (399 to 482 °C); hot enough to melt the thermometers used to gauge the temperature.

In the 1960s, the area of the fire was inhabited by 1300 people.

== Early history ==
The Carbondale mine fire began in either 1943 or 1946 when a fire in Carbondale's city dump spread to nearby mine workings. It is unknown if the fire was natural or man-made. In the late 1940s and early 1950s, a number of minor unsuccessful attempts were made to stop the fire by flooding the burning mine workings. It was the first time that an attempt to excavate a mine fire of that size had been made. In the 1950s, boreholes were dug around the perimeter of the fire and filled with a variety of materials, including sediment and sand. In this decade, an attempt was made to dig out the fire. In 1956, it was projected to take three years, but it continued into the 1960s and caused significant property damage. During the excavation, large amounts of coal were removed from the area. During the excavation, the fire nearly spread to the east side or downtown part of Carbondale, but was successfully contained.

The first fatalities of the fire occurred in 1952, when the fire spread under the house of a couple and asphyxiated them with carbon monoxide. Some time later, several dozen people were poisoned by carbon monoxide from the fire, but there were no fatalities.

In 1959, the federal government designated the West Side of Carbondale as an "urban redevelopment district" due to the Carbondale mine fire.

In 1960, evacuation began in the vicinity of the Carbondale mine fire and over the following decade, mine experts acknowledged the fire's continued spread. Around this time, a proposal was made to drain nearby lakes to use those waters to flood the fire, citing a project cost of $100,000. Another plan proposed smothering the fire with dry ice, an option deemed impractical due to the fire's large size.

== Later history ==
The Carbondale mine fire was extinguished or contained by 1972 or 1974. In 1986, 34 boreholes were installed at the site of the Carbondale mine fire by the Office of Surface Mining. As of 2000, the site of the Carbondale mine fire was being checked regularly to verify its containment. The fire forced approximately 1000 residents to evacuate, caused millions of dollars in damage, and destroyed approximately 500 buildings.

By 2014, the fire was confirmed to have been extinguished and the area was redeveloped.

== Media response ==
The Carbondale mine fire received notoriety in local newspapers in its early years, and excavation attempts of the 1950s and 1960s were covered in the May 1960 issue of Popular Science magazine. The Saturday Evening Post featured a story on the fire in 1963, saying that the excavation effort was moving more earth than the construction of the Panama Canal.

The novel The Hollow Ground features a mine fire based on the Carbondale mine fire.

== See also ==
- Centralia mine fire
- Laurel Run mine fire
