= Fannie Ruth Robinson =

American author, poet, and educator

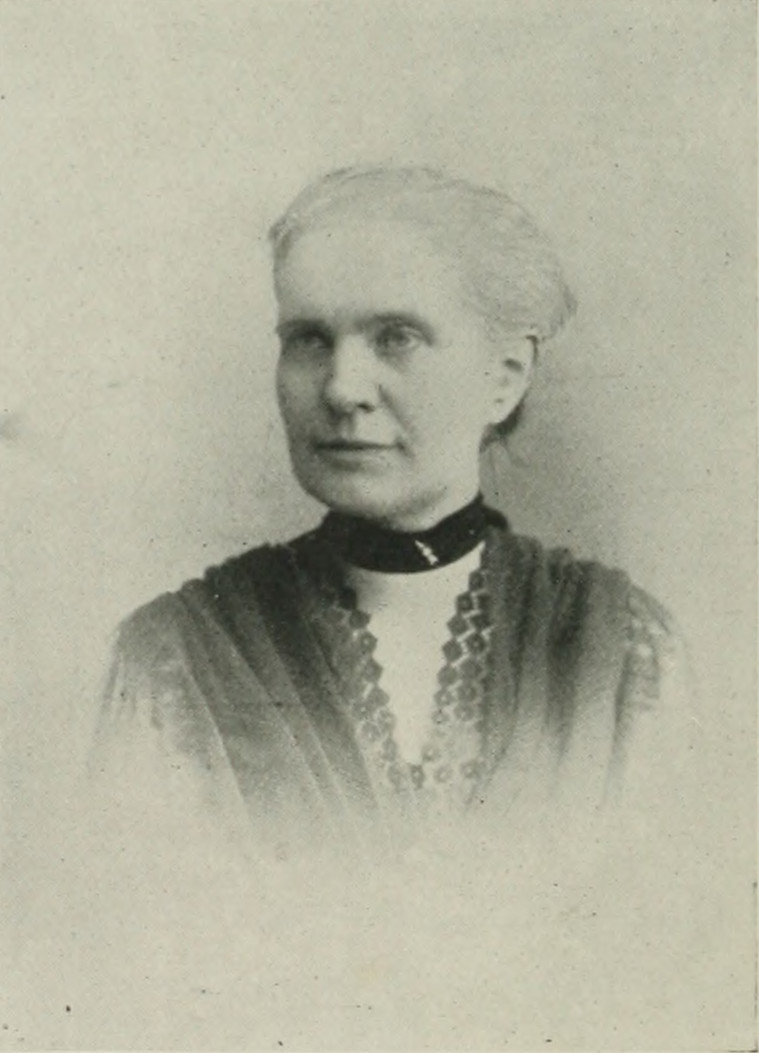
- Robinson, A woman of the century
- Born: September 30, 1847; Carbondale, Pennsylvania
- Died: April 29, 1925 (aged 77); Newark, Ohio
- Education: Rutgers' College
- Occupations: Author, poet, and educator

Fannie Ruth Robinson (September 30, 1847 – April 29, 1925) was an American author, poet, and educator.

== Early life ==
Fannie Ruth Robinson was born in 1847 in Carbondale, Pennsylvania.

In 1859, her parents took up their residence in Albany, New York, and there the formative years of her life were passed. She graduated at the age of seventeen years from the Albany Female Academy, and later received the degree of A. M. from Rutgers' College, New York.

Among the influences which quickened her early ambitions, she recognized three: first, the impulses received from a small circle of men and women, some of whom were very much older than herself; second, the impetus given to youthful ambitions by a class of young people in the alumnae of the female academy, and third, the lift into a rarer air which was hers, happily through many seasons, when Ralph Waldo Emerson and Wendell Phillips, George William Curtiss and Henry Ward Beecher, Chapin and Oliver Wendell Holmes Sr. went to the capital city at the bidding of the Gloucester Lyceum.

== Career ==
Fannie Ruth Robinson began to write early. Most of her published poems appeared in Harper's Magazine in the years between 1870 and 1880, during which time she wrote occasionally for the "Contributor's Club" of the Atlantic Monthly. Her poem, "A Quaker's Christmas Eve," was copied in almost every city in the Union. Albany twice paid her the honor of asking for her verse, once for the services of the first Decoration Day, and again when an ode was to be written for the ceremony of laying the cornerstone of the capitol.

In 1879 she began to teach, and since then she wrote little for publication. A poem on Emerson, published after his death in the Journal of Philosophy, was considered one of her best. Two of her sonnets found place in the collection of Representative American Sonnets, made in 1890 by Charles Henry Crandall.

She was preceptress of Ferry Hall Seminary, the women's department of Lake Forest University, Lake Forest, Illinois, a position she held since 1868. Later she was president of the Oxford College, Hamilton, Ohio, until 1893 when she was replaced by Jane B. Sherzer. In 1895 she was principal of the Michigan Seminary (now Kalamazoo College). Robinson moved in 1901 to the position of president of the Oxford College for Young Ladies, succeeding Dr. J. H. Thomas and in 1904 she became principal of college, reorganized by John F. Fenton. In 1905 she resigned.

She was a member of the Woman's Educational Auxiliary of the 1893 World's Columbian Exposition.
