= Chapman Creek =

Stream in Pennsylvania, United States

Physical characteristics
- Source
  - location: valley in Union Township, Snyder County, Pennsylvania
  - elevation: 785 ft (239 m)
- Mouth
  - location: Susquehanna River in Port Trevorton on the border between Chapman Township, Snyder County, Pennsylvania and Union Township, Snyder County, Pennsylvania
  - coordinates: 40°41′01″N 76°53′07″W
  - elevation: 400 ft (120 m)
- Length: 4.2 mi (6.8 km)
- Basin size: 2.81 mi^{2} (7.3 km^{2})

Basin features
- Progression: Susquehanna River → Chesapeake Bay
- Tributaries
  - left: five unnamed tributaries
  - right: five unnamed tributaries

Chapman Creek is a tributary of the Susquehanna River in Snyder County, Pennsylvania, in the United States. It is approximately 4.2 miles (6.8 km) long and flows through Union Township and Chapman Township. The watershed of the creek has an area of 2.81 square miles (7.3 km^{2}). The creek has no named tributaries and is not designated as an impaired waterbody. Its drainage basin is designated as a Warmwater Fishery and a Migratory Fishery.

== Course ==
Chapman Creek begins in a valley in Union Township. It flows south-southwest for a few tenths of a mile before turning south-southeast for several tenths of a mile. In this reach, the creek begins to flow along the border between Union Township and Chapman Township. It eventually receives an unnamed tributary from the right and turns southeast for roughly a mile, receiving three unnamed tributaries from the left. The creek then turns south-southeast for a few tenths of a mile, entering the census-designated place of Port Trevorton and receiving another unnamed tributary from the left. It then turns southeast for several tenths of a mile before receiving an unnamed tributary from the left and continuing southeast. Several tenths of a mile further downstream, the creek turns south-southeast. After several tenths of a mile, it leaves its valley and crosses US Route 11/US Route 15. It then meanders in the same direction for a few tenths of a mile before reaching its confluence with the Susquehanna River.

Chapman Creek joins the Susquehanna River 110.34 miles (177.58 km) upstream of its mouth.

== Hydrology, geography and geology ==
The elevation near the mouth of Chapman Creek is 400 feet (120 m) above sea level. The elevation of the creek's source is 785 feet (239 m) above sea level.

The Snyder County Multi-jurisdictional Hazard Mitigation Plan has proposed a project that would enhance streambank stability along 200 feet (61 m) of Chapman Creek, reducing erosion along the creek's banks. This project would involve quarry rock/riprap or gabion baskets. As of 2013, the status of this project is unknown.

Chapman Creek is not designated as an impaired waterbody.

== Watershed ==
The watershed of Chapman Creek has an area of 2.81 square miles (7.3 km^{2}). The creek is entirely within the United States Geological Survey quadrangle of Dalmatia. Its mouth is located within 1 mile (1.6 km) of Chapman.

Chapman Creek is one of the major streams in Chapman Township (along with Independence Run and West Branch Mahantango Creek) and one of the major streams in Union Township (along with Silver Creek and Middle Creek. Chapman Creek forms the southern border of Union Township and the northern border of Chapman Township.

The drainage basin of Chapman Creek is designated as a Warmwater Fishery and a Migratory Fishery. The designated use of Chapman Creek is aquatic life.

== History ==
Chapman Creek was entered into the Geographic Names Information System on August 2, 1979. Its identifier in the Geographic Names Information System is 1171572.

The Pennsylvania Department of Transportation once applied for a Water Obstruction and Encroachment permit to replace a reinforced concrete I-beam bridge carrying State Route 2013 over Chapman Creek with a reinforced concrete box culvert bridge 20 feet (6.1 m) wide and 7 feet (2.1 m) high. This project did not propose to impact any part of the creek.

== See also ==
- Independence Run, next tributary of the Susquehanna River going downriver
- Herrold Run, next tributary of the Susquehanna River going upriver
- List of rivers of Pennsylvania
