= Dalmatia (disambiguation) =

Dalmatia is a historical region by the Adriatic in Croatia.

Dalmatia may also refer to:

- any of the historical Dalmatian political entities:
  - Dalmatia (Roman province) (32 BC–c. 482 AD)
  - Dalmatia (theme) (c. 870–1060s)
  - Venetian Dalmatia (1409–1797)
  - Kingdom of Dalmatia (1815–1918)
  - Governorate of Dalmatia (1941–1943)
- MS Dalmatia, a cruise ferry owned by the Croatia-based operator Blue Line
- Dalmatia, Pennsylvania, a census-designated place in Northumberland County, Pennsylvania, United States
- Dalmatia Creek, a tributary of the Susquehanna in Pennsylvania, United States

== See also ==
- Dalmatian (disambiguation)
