= Independence Run =

River in Pennsylvania, United States

Physical characteristics
- Source
  - location: valley in Chapman Township, Snyder County, Pennsylvania
  - elevation: 678 ft (207 m)
- Mouth
  - location: Susquehanna River in Port Trevorton in Chapman Township, Snyder County, Pennsylvania
  - coordinates: 40°40′47″N 76°53′34″W
  - elevation: 404 ft (123 m)
- Length: 3.4 mi (5.5 km)
- Basin size: 3.24 mi^{2} (8.4 km^{2})

Basin features
- Progression: Susquehanna River → Chesapeake Bay
- Tributaries
  - left: one unnamed tributary
  - right: three unnamed tributaries

Independence Run is a tributary of the Susquehanna River in Snyder County, Pennsylvania, in the United States. It is approximately 3.4 miles (5.5 km) long and flows through Chapman Township. The watershed of the stream has an area of 3.24 square miles (8.4 km^{2}) and the stream has no named tributaries. It is one of the major streams in Chapman Township. Its drainage basin is designated as a Warmwater Fishery and a Migaratory Fishery.

== Course ==
Independence Run begins in a valley in Chapman Township. It flows northeast for a few hundred feet before turning east-northeast for over a mile. The stream then turns east-southeast for several tenths of a mile, receiving one unnamed tributary from the left and one from the right. In this reach, it begins flowing near the border of the census-designated place of Port Trevorton. The stream eventually turns south-southeast for more than a mile, receiving an unnamed tributary from the right and entering Port Trevorton, where it immediately receives another unnamed tributary from the right. It continues flowing in the same direction for a few tenths of a mile until it crosses US Route 11/US Route 15. A short distance further downstream, the stream reaches its confluence with the Susquehanna River.

Independence Run joins the Susquehanna River 109.82 miles (176.74 km) upriver of its mouth.

== Geography and geology ==
The elevation near the mouth of Independence Run is 404 feet (123 m) above sea level. The elevation of the stream's source is 678 feet (207 m) above sea level.

A road runs parallel to Independence Run for much of its length.

== Watershed and biology ==
The watershed of Independence Run has an area of 3.24 square miles (8.4 km^{2}). The stream is entirely within the United States Geological Survey quadrangle of Dalmatia. Its mouth is located within 1 mile (1.6 km) of Chapman and is also near the community of Independence.

Independence Run is one of the major streams in Chapman Township, along with Chapman Creek and West Branch Mahantango Creek. Many of the streams in the township have a tendency to flow through open agricultural areas, allowing sediments and chemicals to reach the stream. However, planting trees along streambanks to create a riparian buffer would improve this, as well as connect forest habitats.

The drainage basin of Independence Run is designated as a Warmwater Fishery and a Migratory Fishery. In 2016, the Pennsylvania Fish and Boat Commission passed regulations affecting Independence Run from its mouth to a point 0.5 miles (0.80 km) upstream. This regulation forbade any attempt to target or catch bass between May 1 and June 17, with immediate catch and release being in effect for bass the rest of the year.

== History ==
Independence Run was entered into the Geographic Names Information System on August 2, 1979. Its identifier in the Geographic Names Information System is 1177726.

== See also ==
- Dalmatia Creek, next tributary of the Susquehanna River going downriver
- Chapman Creek, next tributary of the Susquehanna River going upriver
- List of rivers of Pennsylvania
