= Herrold Run =

Herrold Run Harrold Run

Physical characteristics
- Source
  - location: hill in Union Township, Snyder County, Pennsylvania
  - elevation: 721 ft (220 m)
- Mouth
  - location: Susquehanna River in Port Trevorton in Union Township, Snyder County, Pennsylvania
  - coordinates: 40°41′34″N 76°52′28″W
  - elevation: 404 ft (123 m)
- Length: 2.1 mi (3.4 km)
- Basin size: 0.79 mi^{2} (2.0 km^{2})

Basin features
- Progression: Susquehanna River → Chesapeake Bay

Herrold Run (also known as Harrold Run) is a tributary of the Susquehanna River in Snyder County, Pennsylvania, in the United States. It is approximately 2.1 miles (3.4 km) long and flows through Union Township. The watershed of the stream has an area of 0.79 square miles (2.0 km^{2}). The stream is relatively small and the stream is crossed by at least one bridge. Two schools historically existed in the stream's vicinity. Its drainage basin is designated as a Warmwater Fishery and a Migratory Fishery.

== Course ==
Herrold Run begins on a hill in Union Township. It flows southeast for a short distance before turning east-southeast and entering a valley. After several tenths of a mile, the stream turns southeast for several tenths of a mile. It then turns south-southeast, entering the census-designated place of Port Trevorton. A few tenths of a mile further downstream, the stream turns southeast, crossing US Route 11/US Route 15. It then continues in the same direction for a short distance before reaching its confluence with the Susquehanna River.

Herrold Run joins the Susquehanna River 111.24 miles (179.02 km) upstream of its mouth.

== Geography and geology ==
The elevation near the mouth of Herrold Run is 404 feet (123 m) above sea level. The elevation of the stream's source is 721 feet (220 m) above sea level.

Herrold Run is a relatively small stream. Its headwaters are approximately 1.5 miles (2.4 km) north of Chapman and 0.5 miles (0.80 km) east of Susquehanna Church. The mouth of the stream is approximately 0.7 miles (1.1 km) northeast of Chapman and 0.8 miles (1.3 km) of Port Trevorton.

== Watershed and biology ==
The watershed of Herrold Run has an area of 0.79 square miles (2.0 km^{2}). The stream is entirely within the United States Geological Survey quadrangle of Dalmatia. Its mouth is located within 1 mile (1.6 km) of Chapman.

A general store known as Hilsher's General Store is located in the vicinity of Herrold Run.

The drainage basin of Herrold Run is designated as a Warmwater Fishery and a Migratory Fishery.

== History and name ==
Herrold Run was entered into the Geographic Names Information System on August 2, 1979. Its identifier in the Geographic Names Information System is 1176889. The stream is also known as Harrold Run. This variant name appears in a United States Geological Survey map.

In the late 1960s, civil engineer Stanley K. Hampsell found that although Herrold Run was referred to as "Harrold Run" on United States Geological Survey maps, locals have always spelled is as "Herrold Run", and never as "Harrold Run". He discovered official records at the Snyder County Courthouse referring to Herrold Run by name; these records dated to December 1864.

Historically, there were two schools in the vicinity of Herrold Run. They were known as the "Herrold Sch." and the "Upper Herrold School".

In May 2011, a $243,451 project to replace a bridge over Herrold Run with a box culvert and improve the adjacent road was begun. On July 7, 2011, the Pennsylvania Department of Transportation issued a statement saying that it would open the bridge the next day.

== See also ==
- Chapman Creek, next tributary of the Susquehanna River going downriver
- Silver Creek (Susquehanna River), next tributary of the Susquehanna River going upriver
- List of rivers of Pennsylvania
