= Hoffer Creek =

Physical characteristics
- Source
  - location: small pond in a valley in Chapman Township, Snyder County, Pennsylvania
  - elevation: 643 ft (196 m)
- Mouth
  - location: Susquehanna River in Chapman Township, Snyder County, Pennsylvania near Dalmatia
  - coordinates: 40°39′07″N 76°55′22″W
  - elevation: 397 ft (121 m)
- Length: 3.1 mi (5.0 km)
- Basin size: 2.34 mi^{2} (6.1 km^{2})

Basin features
- Progression: Susquehanna River → Chesapeake Bay
- Tributaries
  - left: four unnamed tributaries
  - right: four unnamed tributaries

Hoffer Creek is a tributary of the Susquehanna River in Snyder County, Pennsylvania, in the United States. It is approximately 3.1 miles (5.0 km) long and flows through Chapman Township. The watershed of the creek has an area of 2.34 square miles (6.1 km^{2}). At least part of the creek is designated as an impaired waterbody due to sedimentation/siltation from grazing-related agriculture. The creek is in the ridge and valley physiographic province, and the geology consists mostly of interbedded sedimentary rock and sandstone.

The main land use in the watershed of Hoffer Creek is agricultural land. However, forested land is also common and there is some low-intensity development. The creek's drainage basin is designated as a Warmwater Fishery and a Migratory Fishery. The creek has few or no riparian buffers in agricultural areas.

== Course ==
Hoffer Creek begins in a small pond in a valley in Chapman Township. It flows east-southeast for a few tenths of a mile, passing through another pond and receiving an unnamed tributary from the left. The creek then turns south-southeast for several tenths of a mile, receiving two unnamed tributaries from the left, and in between them, one unnamed tributary from the right. It then turns southwest and then south, receiving another unnamed tributary from the right before eventually turning south-southeast for more than a mile. In this reach, it receives an unnamed tributary from the right and its valley eventually becomes much shallower. The creek then turns southwest for several hundred feet before turning south-southeast and receiving an unnamed tributary from the right. Several tenths of a mile further downstream, it receives a very short unnamed tributary from the left before crossing US Route 11/US Route 15 and reaching its confluence with the Susquehanna River.

Hoffer Creek joins the Susquehanna River 107.34 miles (172.75 km) upstream of its mouth.

=== Tributaries ===
Hoffer Creek has no named tributaries. However, it does have several unnamed tributaries. Three of these are Unt 17489, Unt 17490, and Unt 17491.

== Hydrology and climate ==
Hoffer Creek is designated as an impaired waterbody. The cause of the impairment is sedimentation/siltation and a probable of the impairment is grazing-related agriculture.

As of the early 2010s, the sediment load in Hoffer Creek—including an adjacent unnamed tributary to the Susquehanna River—is 864,600 pounds (392,200 kg) per year, or 2,451 pounds (1,112 kg) per day. This requires a 5 percent reduction to meet the creek's total maximum daily load for sediment: 2,238 pounds (1,015 kg) per day, or 816,876 pounds (370,529 kg) per year. Cropland is the largest contributor of sediment, accounting for 670,000 pounds (300,000 kg) per year. Hay/pastures account for 90,200 pounds (40,900 kg) per year, while stream banks account for 76,800 pounds (34,800 kg) per year. Another 25,600 pounds (11,600 kg) comes annually from transitional land, while 24,400 pounds (11,100 kg) comes from low-intensity development. Forests contribute 7,400 pounds (3,400 kg) of sediment per year.

The average annual rate of rainfall in the watershed of Hoffer Creek over a 19-year period was approximately 39.3 inches (100 cm). The average annual rate of runoff in the watershed during a 19-year period was approximately 2.9 inches (7.4 cm).

== Geography and geology ==
The elevation near the mouth of Hoffer Creek is 397 feet (121 m) above sea level. The elevation of the creek's source is 643 feet (196 m) above sea level. The elevations in the watershed range from less than 400 feet (120 m) above sea level at the lowest to more than 700 feet (210 m) above sea level at the highest.

Hoffer Creek is in the Ridge and Valley physiographic province.

The surface geology in the watershed of Hoffer Creek—including an adjacent unnamed tributary to the Susquehanna River—is dominated by interbedded sedimentary rock, which underlies 70 percent of the watershed. Sandstone occupies another 25 percent of the watershed's area. The remaining 5 percent is split between carbonate rock (4 percent) and conglomerate (1 percent). The geology of the watershed has little influence on the creek's sediment load.

The level of slope in the watershed of Hoffer Creek, combined with the lack of conservation farming practices in the upper reaches of the watershed, causes fast-moving silty runoff to form during precipitation events, degrading the creek and all its tributaries. The dominant hydrologic soil groups in the watershed include C (80 percent) and B (20 percent). Streambank erosion occurs in the creek's watershed.

== Watershed ==
The watershed of Hoffer Creek has an area of 2.34 square miles (6.1 km^{2}). The creek is entirely within the United States Geological Survey quadrangle of Dalmatia. Its mouth is located near Dalmatia.

The dominant land use in the watershed of Hoffer Creek is agricultural land, which accounts for 51.0 percent of the watershed's area including 521.4 acres (211.0 ha) of hay/pastures and 313.8 acres (127.0 ha) of cropland. Forested land occupies 42.9 percent of the creek's watershed and low-intensity development occupies 6.1 percent.

There are a total of 8.1 miles (13.0 km) of streams in the watershed of Hoffer Creek. All the streams in the watershed are in Chapman Township, in the southern part of Snyder County.

== History ==
Hoffer Creek was entered into the Geographic Names Information System on August 2, 1979. Its identifier in the Geographic Names Information System is 1177159.

The Pennsylvania Department of Transportation was once issued an Encroachment permit to build and maintain an articulated grout mattress in Hoffer Creek, under a bridge carrying State Route 2002.

In June 2012, the Pennsylvania Department of Environmental Protection invited comments on its proposed total maximum daily load for Hoffer Creek. However, no public comments were received.

== Biology ==
The drainage basin of Hoffer Creek is designated as a Warmwater Fishery and a Migratory Fishery. The designated use for the creek is aquatic life.

In agricultural areas along Hoffer Creek, there are few or no riparian buffers. Additionally, livestock have access to the creek and conservation farming practices are not done in the watershed.

== See also ==
- Mahantango Creek (Snyder County), next tributary of the Susquehanna River going downriver
- Dalmatia Creek, next tributary of the Susquehanna River going upriver
- List of rivers of Pennsylvania
