= Silver Creek (Susquehanna River tributary) =

Silver Creek Silver Run, Verdilla Run

Physical characteristics
- Source
  - location: hill in Washington Township, Snyder County, Pennsylvania
  - elevation: 798 ft (243 m)
- Mouth
  - location: Susquehanna River in Port Trevorton, in Union Township, Snyder County, Pennsylvania
  - coordinates: 40°41′45″N 76°52′16″W
  - elevation: 410 ft (120 m)
- Length: 6.1 mi (9.8 km)
- Basin size: 5.92 mi^{2} (15.3 km^{2})

Basin features
- Progression: Susquehanna River → Chesapeake Bay
- Tributaries
  - left: three unnamed tributaries
  - right: two unnamed tributaries

Silver Creek (also known as Silver Run or Verdilla Run) is a tributary of the Susquehanna River in Snyder County, Pennsylvania, in the United States. It is approximately 6.1 miles (9.8 km) long and flows through Washington Township and Union Township. The watershed of the creek has an area of 5.92 square miles (15.3 km^{2}). The creek has no named tributaries, but it does have several unnamed tributaries. Many of these, as well as Silver Creek itself, are impaired by sedimentation/siltation due to grazing-related agriculture. The watershed is partly or fully in the Ridge and Valley physiographic province.

The dominant land use in the upper reaches of the watershed of Silver Creek is agricultural land. However, forests and other land uses are also present, and some pockets of development occur in the creek's valley. The creek causes flooding in the southern part of Union Township. A number of bridges have been constructed across Silver Creek. Its drainage basin is designated as a Warmwater Fishery and a Migratory Fishery.

== Course ==
Silver Creek begins on a hill in Washington Township. It flows south for a few tenths of a mile, almost immediately entering Union Township and entering a valley. The creek then gradually turns east for several tenths of a mile before turning east-southeast. After several tenths of a mile, it turns east and then north-northeast before turning east-northeast for several tenths of a mile, receiving an unnamed tributary from the left. The creek then flows east-southeast for several tenths of a mile, receiving another unnamed tributary from the left before eventually turning south-southeast. A short distance further downstream, the creek receives an unnamed tributary from the right and turns east-northeast for several tenths of a mile before turning east-southeast and receiving an unnamed tributary from the left. It then turns south-southeast for a few tenths of a mile before turning west-southwest and then south-southeast. The creek soon turns south-southwest for several tenths of a mile, passing through a small pond before turning southwest and receiving another unnamed tributary from the right. It then turns south-southeast for several tenths of a mile, entering the census-designated place of Port Trevorton, where it continues flowing in the same direction. After several tenths of a mile, it crosses U.S. Route 11/U.S. Route 15, and a short distance after that, it reaches its confluence with the Susquehanna River.

Silver Creek joins the Susquehanna River 111.62 miles (179.63 km) upstream of its mouth.

=== Tributaries ===
Silver Creek has no named tributaries. However, it does have five unnamed tributaries, two of which each have a single sub-tributary of their own. Five tributaries and subtributaries of the creek—Unt 17535, Unt 17536, Unt 17537, Unt 17538, and Unt 17539— are designated as impaired waterbodies, for the same reason as Silver Creek itself. The lengths of these five streams range from 0.39 to 1.14 miles (0.63 to 1.83 km).

== Hydrology ==
Some reaches of Silver Creek are designated as impaired waterbodies. The cause of the impairment is sedimentation/siltation and the source of impairment is grazing-related agriculture. All stream segments in the upper reaches of the watershed are considered to be impaired, while none are impaired in the lower reaches.

The annual sediment load in the upper 2,664 acres (1,078 ha) creek is 3,129,000 pounds (1,419,000 kg). The maximum load for sediment that that reach of the creek can have while still meeting water quality standards is 1,591,811 pounds (722,033 kg) per year. Cropland is the largest source of sediment, accounting for 2,834,200 pounds (1,285,600 kg) per year. Streambanks and hay/pasture land are the next-largest contributors, accounting for 141,000 and 108,000 pounds (64,000 and 49,000 kg) per year, respectively. Transitional land accounts for 26,600 pounds (12,100 kg) per year, low-intensity development accounts for 17,000 pounds (7,700 kg), and forested land accounts for 2,200 pounds (1,000 kg) per year.

Ag Development once received a permit to discharge stormwater into Silver Creek for construction purposes.

== Geography, geology, and climate ==
The elevation near the mouth of Silver Creek is 410 feet (120 m) above sea level. The elevation of the creek's source is 798 feet (243 m) above sea level.

Silver Creek is partly or fully in the Ridge and Valley physiographic province. The dominant hydrologic soil group in the upper part of the watershed is C. There are significant deposits of sediment along the stream, and streambank erosion occurs in the watershed. The surface geology consists of interbedded sedimentary rock in 89 percent of the upper part of the watershed and sandstone in the remaining 11 percent.

The average annual rate of precipitation in the upper part of the watershed of Silver Creek over a 23-year period was 42.11 inches (107.0 cm). The average annual rate of runoff in the watershed during a 23-year-period was 3.66 inches (9.3 cm).

== Watershed and biology ==
The watershed of Silver Creek has an area of 5.92 square miles (15.3 km^{2}). The mouth of the creek is located in the United States Geological Survey quadrangle of Pillow. However, its source is located in the quadrangle of Dalmatia. The mouth of the creek is approximately 0.7 miles (1.1 km) southwest of Port Trevorton and 1.1 miles (1.8 km) northeast of Chapman. Its source is located near Verdilla. There are approximately 9.06 miles (14.58 km) of streams in the watershed of Silver Creek.

The main land use in the upper part of the watershed of Silver Creek is agricultural land, which accounts for 76 percent of the watershed's area. This includes 1,137 acres (460 ha) of hay and pasture land and 890 acres (360 ha) of cropland. Another 15 percent is forested land, and the remaining 9 percent has other uses. A total of 12 acres (4.9 ha) of land in this part of the watershed is transitional land. There are some areas of developed land along the creek. Tillage is done in the watershed's agricultural areas.

The southern part of Union Township in impacted by flooding from Silver Creek. During Tropical Storm Agnes in June 1972, flood levels reached to between the 100 year flood and the 500 year flood.

== History and name ==
Silver Creek was entered into the Geographic Names Information System on August 2, 1979. Its identifier in the Geographic Names Information System is 1187671. The creek is also known as Silver Run and Verdilla Run. Both of these variant names appear on a 1953 United States Geological Survey map.

In the late 1960s, civil engineer Stanley K. Sampsell was unable to find any official records to determine the name of Silver Creek. The United States Geological Survey's 15' Millersburg map called the upper part of the creek (which flows in a roughly southeasterly direction) "Verdilla Run" and the lower part (which flows in a roughly southerly direction) "Silver Run". Sampsell checked with nearly all people living along the stream, and everyone referred to it as "Silver Creek" and had never heard of the names "Silver Run" or "Verdilla Run". For this reason, he formally proposed that the creek be officially renamed to "Silver Creek".

In the late 1920s, the Commissioners of Snyder County had plans for the construction of a bridge over Silver Creek near Port Trevorton. A concrete slab bridge carrying Cawley Hill Road over Silver Creek was built in 1949 1 mile (1.6 km) south of Verdilla and is 22.0 feet (6.7 m) long. A concrete tee beam bridge over the creek in or near Port Trevorton was built in 1951 and is 28.9 feet (8.8 m) long. A concrete slab bridge carrying State Route 2012 over the creek was built 4 miles (6.4 km) northwest of Port Trevorton in 1953 and reconstructed in 2008; this bridge is 21.0 feet (6.4 m) long. A concrete tee beam bridge carrying Silver Creek Hollow Road over the creek was built 2 miles (3.2 km) south of Dundore in 1955 and is 37.1 feet (11.3 m) long. A concrete slab bridge carrying the same road over the creek was built 2 miles (3.2 km) north of Port Trevorton in 1965 and is 26.9 feet (8.2 m) long. A third bridge over this road, a concrete culvert bridge, was built 1 mile (1.6 km) northwest of Port Trevorton in 1985 and is 27.9 feet (8.5 m) long. A prestressed slab bridge carrying U.S. Route 11 over the creek was built in 1992 and is 28.9 feet (8.8 m) long.

In 2011, the Pennsylvania Department of Environmental Protection solicited comments on its proposed total maximum daily load for the Silver Creek watershed. However, no public comments were received.

== Biology ==
The drainage basin of Silver Creek is designated as a Warmwater Fishery and a Migratory Fishery. The designated use of Silver Creek is aquatic life.

Silver Creek has little or no riparian buffer where it flows through agricultural land, and some reaches experience mowing up to the stream's banks. Livestock also have access to the creek.

== See also ==
- Herrold Run, next tributary of the Susquehanna River going downriver
- Fidlers Run, next tributary of the Susquehanna River going upriver
- List of rivers of Pennsylvania
