= Dalmatian people =

Dalmatian people may refer to:

- Croats
- Dalmatian Italians
- Dalmatae

== See also ==
- Dalmatian (disambiguation)
- Dalmatian identity
- Illyrian (South Slavic)
