= Trevorton Bridge =

- Coordinates: 40°42′35″N 76°51′08″W
- Crosses: Susquehanna River
- Locale: Northumberland, Pennsylvania, United States
- Other name(s): Port Trevorton

Characteristics
- Design: Wooden truss bridge
- Total length: 3,460 ft (1,050 m)

History
- Built: 1850s
- Closed: 1870

The Trevorton Bridge was an uncovered wooden truss bridge that crossed the Susquehanna River. It was erected between Herndon in Northumberland County and Port Trevorton in Snyder County, Pennsylvania. The bridge was 3,460 feet (1,050 m) long, with a 1,400-foot (430 m) trestle crossing White Island in the middle of the river. It was originally built in 1854 as a railroad bridge by the Susquehanna & Union Bridge Co., later a subsidiary of the Trevorton and Susquehanna Railroad and, in September 1855, the bridge was adapted for use as a road bridge as well as for trains. The bridge was most often used to cross the Susquehanna by cattle. The continuous crossing of cattle endangered the already weakened bridge (weakened from acid in the bark the pine used to construct the bridge). The bridge was eventually dismantled in 1870 for fear that it would collapse.

== See also ==
- List of crossings of the Susquehanna River
