= Fidlers Run =

Fidlers Run Fiddlers Run, Fidler Run, Fidlers Creek
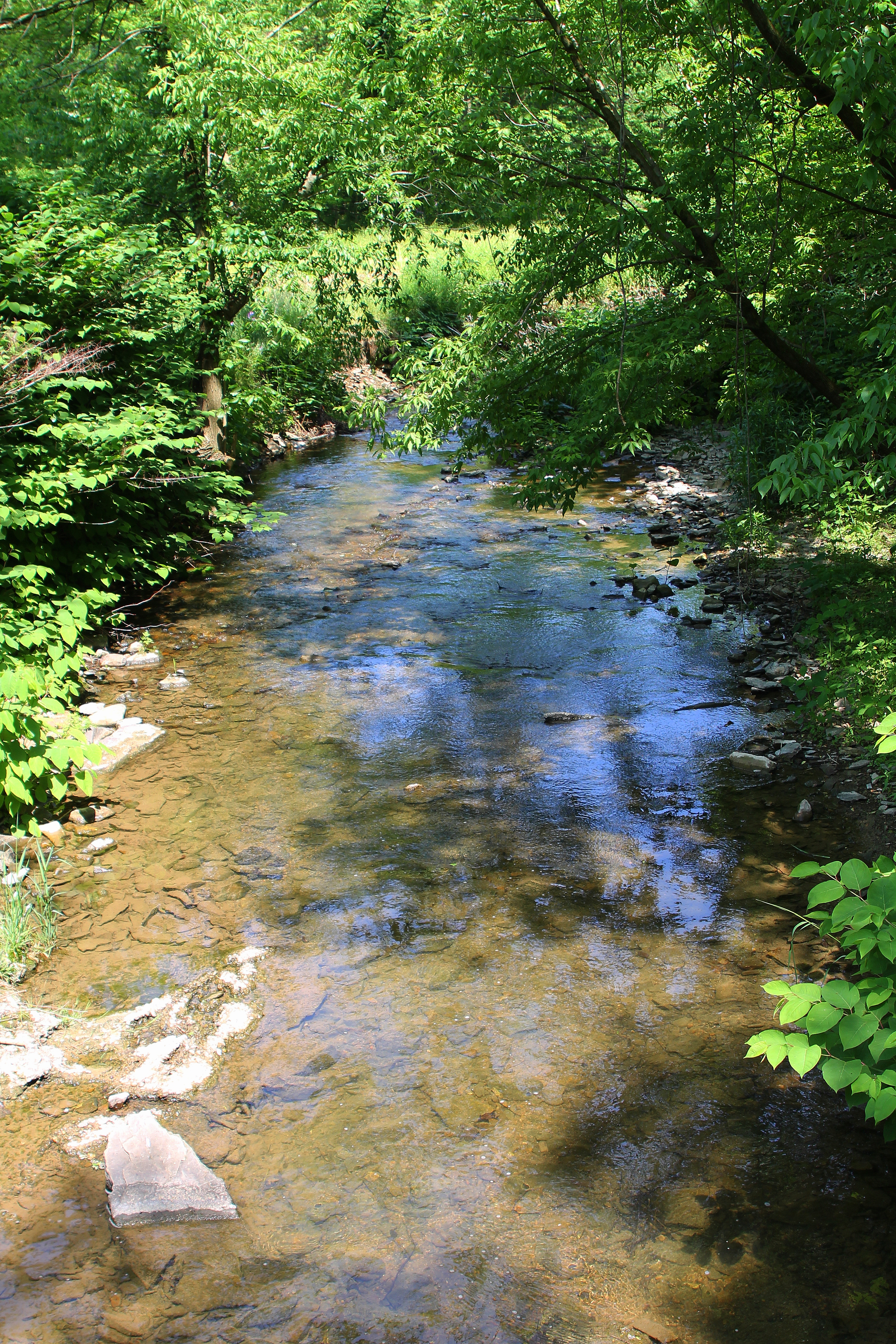
- Fidlers Run looking downstream

Physical characteristics
- Source
  - location: small valley northeast of Mandata in Jackson Township, Northumberland County, Pennsylvania
  - elevation: 634 ft (193 m)
- Mouth
  - location: Susquehanna River in Jackson Township, Northumberland County, Pennsylvania near Herndon
  - coordinates: 40°41′55″N 76°51′15″W
  - elevation: 407 ft (124 m)
- Length: 3.1 mi (5.0 km)
- Basin size: 6.88 mi^{2} (17.8 km^{2})
- Width
  - minimum: 3 feet (0.91 m)
  - maximum: 5 feet (1.5 m)
- Discharge
  - average: 2.7 cu ft/s (0.076 m^{3}/s) instantaneous discharge at mouth, June 15, 1993

Basin features
- Progression: Susquehanna River → Chesapeake Bay
- Tributaries
  - left: two unnamed tributaries
  - right: two unnamed tributaries

Fidlers Run (also known as Fiddlers Run, Fidler Run, or Fidlers Creek) is a tributary of the Susquehanna River in Northumberland County, Pennsylvania, in the United States. It is approximately 3.1 miles (5.0 km) long and flows through Jackson Township and Lower Mahanoy Township. The watershed of the stream has an area of 6.88 square miles (17.8 km^{2}). The stream is not designated as an impaired waterbody, although a reaches of a few of its unnamed tributaries are. It is a small stream, with a width of 3 to 5 feet (0.91 to 1.52 m). Large areas of agricultural land occur along a substantial portion of its length.

In the early 1900s, a reservoir in the watershed of Fidlers Run was used as a water supply for Herndon. A number of bridges have been constructed over the stream. The stream's drainage basin is designated as a Warmwater Fishery and a Migratory Fishery. However, there is little opportunity for trout fishing.

== Course ==
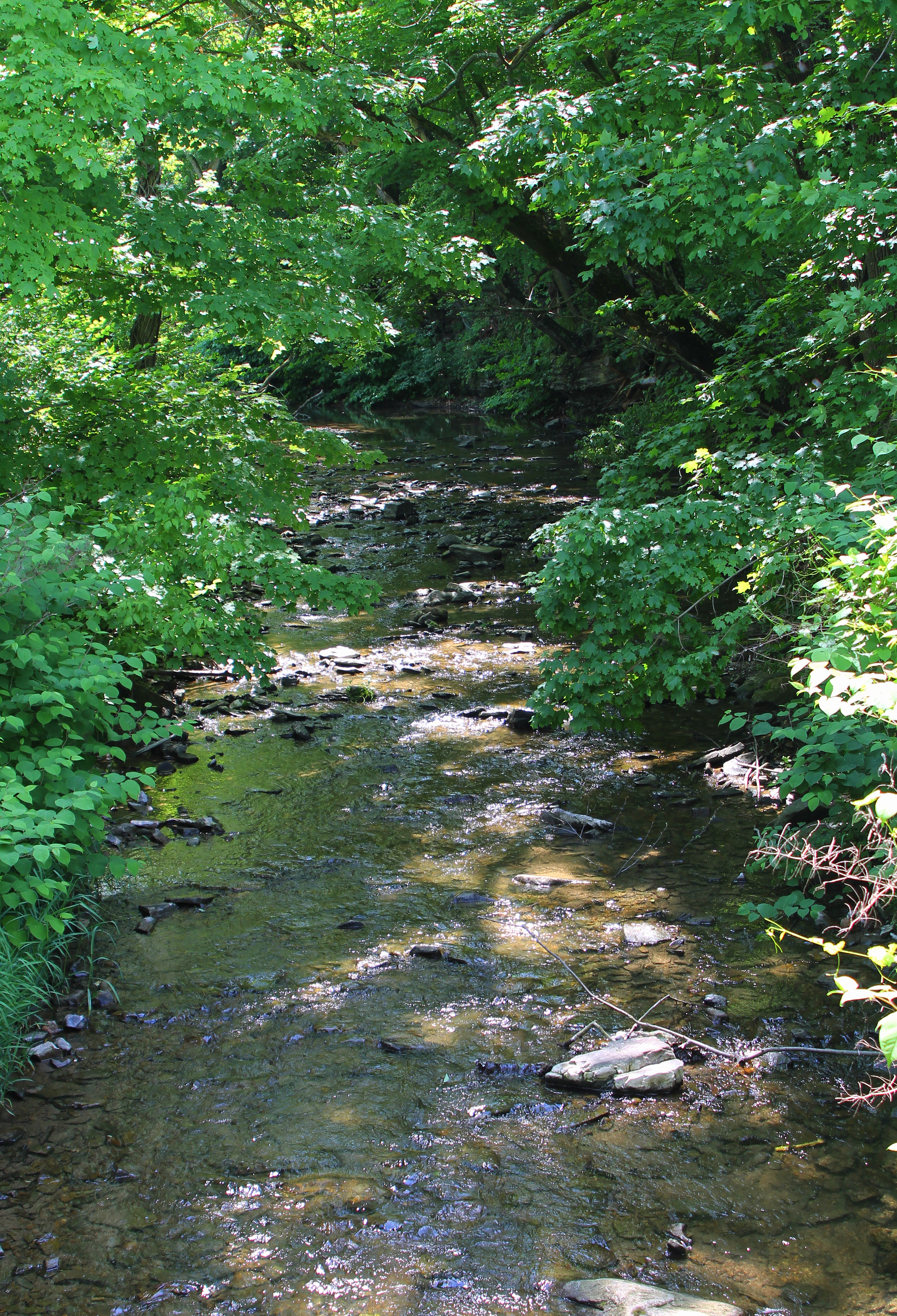
Fidlers Run looking upstream

Fidlers Run begins in a valley in Jackson Township. It flows west through the valley alongside Pennsylvania Route 225 for several tenths of a mile before turning west-southwest for a few tenths of a mile, receiving an unnamed tributary from the right. The stream then turns northwest for a short distance, receiving an unnamed tributary from the right and one from the left. It then flows west-northwest along the border between Jackson Township and Lower Mahanoy Township, near Pennsylvania Route 147. After several tenths of a mile, the stream crosses Pennsylvania Route 147, receives another unnamed tributary from the left, and turns northwest for several tenths of a mile before fully reentering Jackson Township. A few tenths of a mile further downstream, it reaches the end of its valley and turns north-northwest for a few tenths of a mile before reaching its confluence with the Susquehanna River.

Fidlers Run joins the Susquehanna River 112.24 miles (180.63 km) upriver of its mouth.

=== Tributaries ===
Fidlers Run has no named tributaries. However, it does have three unnamed tributaries. At least one of these is fed by springs.

== Hydrology ==
Fidlers Run is not designated as an impaired waterbody. Some of its unnamed tributaries are not designated as impaired waterbodies. However, reaches of some of the stream's unnamed tributaries are in fact designated as impaired, due to siltation from agriculture and grazing-related agriculture.

At the downstream limit of the stretch of Fidlers Run that is on the border of Lower Mahanoy Township, the stream's peak annual discharge has a 10 percent chance of reaching 1,130 cubic feet per second (32 m^{3}/s). It has a 2 percent chance of reaching 1,890 cubic feet per second (54 m^{3}/s) and a 1 percent chance of reaching 2,200 cubic feet per second (62 m^{3}/s). The peak annual discharge has a 0.2 percent chance of reaching 2,920 cubic feet per second (83 m^{3}/s). In June 1993, the instantaneous discharge of the stream was once measured to be 2.7 cubic feet per second (0.076 m^{3}/s).

In June 1993, the water temperature of Fidlers Run at its mouth was once measured to be 19.0 °C (66.2 °F), while the air temperature was 22.0 °C (71.6 °F). The water temperatures can reach above 75 °F (24 °C) at times. The specific conductance was 560 micro-siemens per centimeter at 25 °C (77 °F).

In one measurement in June 1993, the pH of Fidlers Run at its mouth was found to be 8.2. The concentration of dissolved oxygen was 8.8 milligrams per liter (0.0088 oz/cu ft) and the carbon dioxide concentration was 1.5 milligrams per liter (0.0015 oz/cu ft). No carbonate was observed in the stream's filtered water, but 150 milligrams per liter (0.15 oz/cu ft) of bicarbonate was observed. The concentration of atrazine in the creek's unfiltered water was measured to be 300 nanograms per liter (3.0×10^{−7} oz/cu ft)

A National Pollutant Discharge Elimination System permit allowing a facility in Lower Mahanoy Township known as Former Hut Restaurant STP to discharge sewage into Fidlers Run at a point 1.58 miles (2.54 km) upstream of its mouth was issued; it will be effective from April 2015 to March 2020.

== Geography and geology ==
The elevation near the mouth of Fiddlers Run is 407 feet (124 m) above sea level. The elevation of the stream's source is 634 feet (193 m) above sea level.

Fidlers Run is approximately 3 to 5 feet (0.91 to 1.52 m) wide. It has been described as a "tiny stream" and the valley in which its headwaters are located in is small. The stream is one of the last major streams to flow into the Susquehanna River in Northumberland County.

Various types of shale have been observed in the vicinity of Fidlers Run.

== Watershed ==
The watershed of Fidlers Run has an area of 6.88 square miles (17.8 km^{2}). The stream is entirely within the United States Geological Survey quadrangle of Pillow. Its mouth is located within 1 mile (1.6 km) of Herndon. Its source is located approximately 2 miles (3.2 km) northeast of Mandata, near Pennsylvania Route 225.

Fidlers Run flows through agricultural land for much of its length, especially in its upper reaches. However, in its lower reaches, there are "environmentally sensitive" areas along or near the stream, especially on its southern side. The stream's mouth is located near developed land in Herndon.

Flooding was recorded on Fidlers Run, and numerous other streams in the Susquehanna River watershed, due to Tropical Storm Agnes in June 1972.

== History and name ==
Fidlers Run was entered into the Geographic Names Information System on August 2, 1979. Its identifier in the Geographic Names Information System is 1198066. The stream is also known as Fiddlers Run, Fidler Run, or Fidlers Creek. The variant name "Fidlers Creek" appears in Israel C. White's 1883 book The geology of the North Branch Susquehanna River Region in the six counties of Wyoming, Lackawanna, Luzerne, Columbia, Montour and Northumberland. The variant name "Fiddlers Run" appears in the Stream Map of Pennsylvania, created by Howard William Higbee in 1965. The variant name "Fidler Run" appears in United States Geological Survey maps.

In the early 1900s, the water supply for Herndon came from a 35,000-US-gallon (130 m^{3}) reservoir at the headwaters of a tributary to Fidlers Run. The water at this reservoir was soft.

In the late 1960s, civil engineer Stanley K. Sampsell was unable to find any written information on how to spell the name of Fidlers Run. However, the people he spoke to in the Herndon area all pronounced it with an "s" at the end, leading him to recommend that the stream's name be spelled "Fidlers Run".

A two-span concrete slab bridge carrying Pennsylvania Route 225 was constructed across Fidlers Run in 1937 1 mile (1.6 km) south of Mandata and is 34.1 feet (10.4 m) long. In 1960, a steel stringer/multi-beam or girder bridge carrying T-353 over the stream was built 0.5 miles (0.80 km) south of Herndon. This bridge was repaired in 1990 and is 25.9 feet (7.9 m) long. A concrete culvert bridge carrying Pennsylvania Route 225 over the stream in Mandata was built in 1995 and is 27.9 feet (8.5 m) long. In the same year, a prestressed box beam or girders bridge carrying State Route 3012 over the stream was built 0.5 miles (0.80 km) north of Mandata; this bridge is 30.8 feet (9.4 m) long. A concrete culvert bridge carrying State Route 3016 was constructed across Fidlers Run in 2003 in Mandata and is 26.9 feet (8.2 m) long. In May 2012, the replacement of the structurally deficient 25-foot (7.6 m) was slated to begin in that month and be completed in September 2012 for $559,000.

== Biology ==
The drainage basin of Fidlers Run is designated as a Warmwater Fishery and a Migratory Fishery. The designated use of Fidlers Run is aquatic life.

Fidlers Run was described in A. Joseph Armstrong's 2000 book Trout Unlimited's Guide to Pennsylvania Limestone Streams as having "little going for it" by way of trout fishing.

An unnamed tributary to Fidlers Run has experienced "excessive" aquatic plant growth due to nutrient pollution.

== See also ==
- Silver Creek (Susquehanna River), next tributary of the Susquehanna River going downriver
- Mahanoy Creek, next tributary of the Susquehanna River going upriver
- List of rivers of Pennsylvania
