= Himmel's Church Covered Bridge =

- U.S. National Register of Historic Places
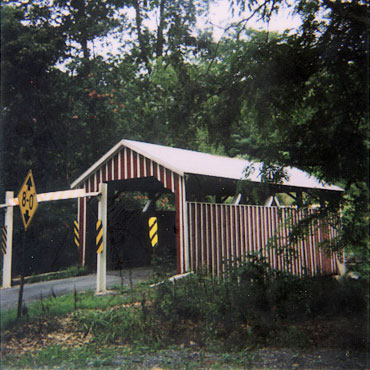
- Himmel's Church Covered Bridge

- Location within Pennsylvania Location within the United States
- Location: Northeast of Rebuck on Township 442, Washington Township, Pennsylvania
- Coordinates: 40°43′22″N 76°43′11″W
- Area: 0.1 acres (0.040 ha)
- Built: 1874
- Architect: Peter Keefer
- Architectural style: Multiple kingpost
- MPS: Covered Bridges of Northumberland County TR
- NRHP reference No.: 79002312
- Added to NRHP: August 8, 1979

The Himmel's Church Covered Bridge crosses over Schwaben Creek on Middle Creek Road, east of Rebuck, Pennsylvania, in Washington Township, Northumberland County, Pennsylvania.

It was added to the National Register of Historic Places on August 8, 1979.

== History ==
Built in 1874, this covered bridge was rehabilitated in 1973. It is a King post, truss-style, wooden, covered bridge that is forty-four feet long.

It remains in use to automobile traffic.

=== In popular culture ===
The Bridge is located near the site of the Schwaben Creek werewolf, according to local folklore.
