= Line Mountain School District =

School district in Pennsylvania

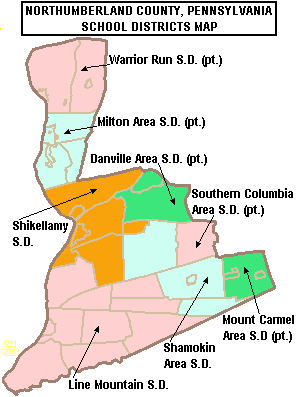

Address
- 185 Line Mountain Road Herndon, Northumberland County, Pennsylvania, 17830-7325; United States

District information
- Type: Public
- Motto: Where All Students Can Learn....Where Fair Is Not Always Equal...Where Assessment Drives Instruction...
- Grades: K-12

Students and staff
- District mascot: Eagles
- Colors: Royal blue and gold

The Line Mountain School District is a small, rural public school district serving portions of Northumberland County, Pennsylvania. The district covers an area of 154.5 square miles (400 km^{2}). Municipalities within its boundaries are the borough of Herndon and multiple townships, including Lower Augusta Township, Little Mahanoy Township, Zerbe Township, West Cameron Township, Jackson Township, Upper Mahanoy Township, Washington Township, Jordan Township, and Lower Mahanoy Township. According to 2000 federal census data, it served a resident population of 8,975. By 2010, the district's population increased to 9,184 people. The educational attainment levels for the population 25 and over were 86.8% high school graduates and 10.3% college graduates. The district is one of the 500 public school districts of Pennsylvania.

According to the Pennsylvania Budget and Policy Center, 38.4% of the district's pupils lived at 185% or below the Federal Poverty Level as shown by their eligibility for the federal free or reduced price school meal programs in 2012. In 2009, the residents' per capita income was $16,400, while the median family income was $41,919 a year. In the Commonwealth, the median family income was $49,501 and the United States median family income was $49,445, in 2010. In Northumberland County, the median household income was $41,208 in 2014. By 2013, the median household income in the United States rose to $52,100. In 2014, the median household income in the USA was $53,700.

== History ==
Line Mountain School District was formed in 1966, when the Pennsylvania School District Reorganization Act of 1963 mandated the merger of Mahanoy Joint School District and Trevorton School District. The first class graduated from Line Mountain in 1967. The new district adopted the blue-and-gold school colors of Mahanoy Joint, later adding the red used by Trevorton.

In 2007, the state conducted a study to examine the gains to be made through the consolidation of the Line Mountain School District into neighboring Millersburg Area School District. The study noted that consolidation could significantly decrease school administrative costs for the communities while significantly improving offerings to students. The report was not acted upon.

From the formation of the school district, four elementary schools served the district: West Cameron Elementary School, Leck Kill Elementary School, Dalmatia Elementary School, and Trevorton Elementary School.

West Cameron Elementary School was closed in 2001. In August 2012, facing additional budget shortfalls, the school board voted to close both Dalmatia Elementary School and Leck Kill Elementary School at the end of the 2012–13 school year. The district moved all elementary students to the renovated Trevorton Elementary School, which was renamed Line Mountain Elementary School.

== Schools ==
- Line Mountain Elementary School (formerly Trevorton Elementary) K – 4th
- Line Mountain Middle School – 5th through 8th
- Line Mountain High School 9th through 12th

High school students may choose to attend Northumberland County Career Technology Center for training in the trades. For the 2014–15 school year, 35 resident students chose to enroll in public, cyber charter schools, rather than attend the district's schools. The Central Susquehanna Intermediate Unit CSIU16 provides the district with a wide variety of services like specialized education for disabled students and hearing, speech and visual disability services and professional development for staff and faculty.

== Extracurriculars ==
Line Mountain School District offers a variety of clubs, activities and an extensive sports program. The district is not a member of the Pennsylvania Heartland Athletic Conference, which is a voluntary association of 28 PIAA High Schools within the central Pennsylvania region.

=== Sports ===
The district funds:

Boys:

- Baseball – AA Varsity and Junior varsity
- Basketball – AAA
- Football – AA
- Soccer – A
- Wrestling – AA

Girls:

- Basketball – AA
- Field Hockey – A
- Soccer (Fall) – A
- Softball – AA

Junior High School Sports

Boys:

- Basketball
- Wrestling

Girls:

- Basketball
- Field Hockey

According to PIAA directory July 2017
