= Dalmatia Creek =

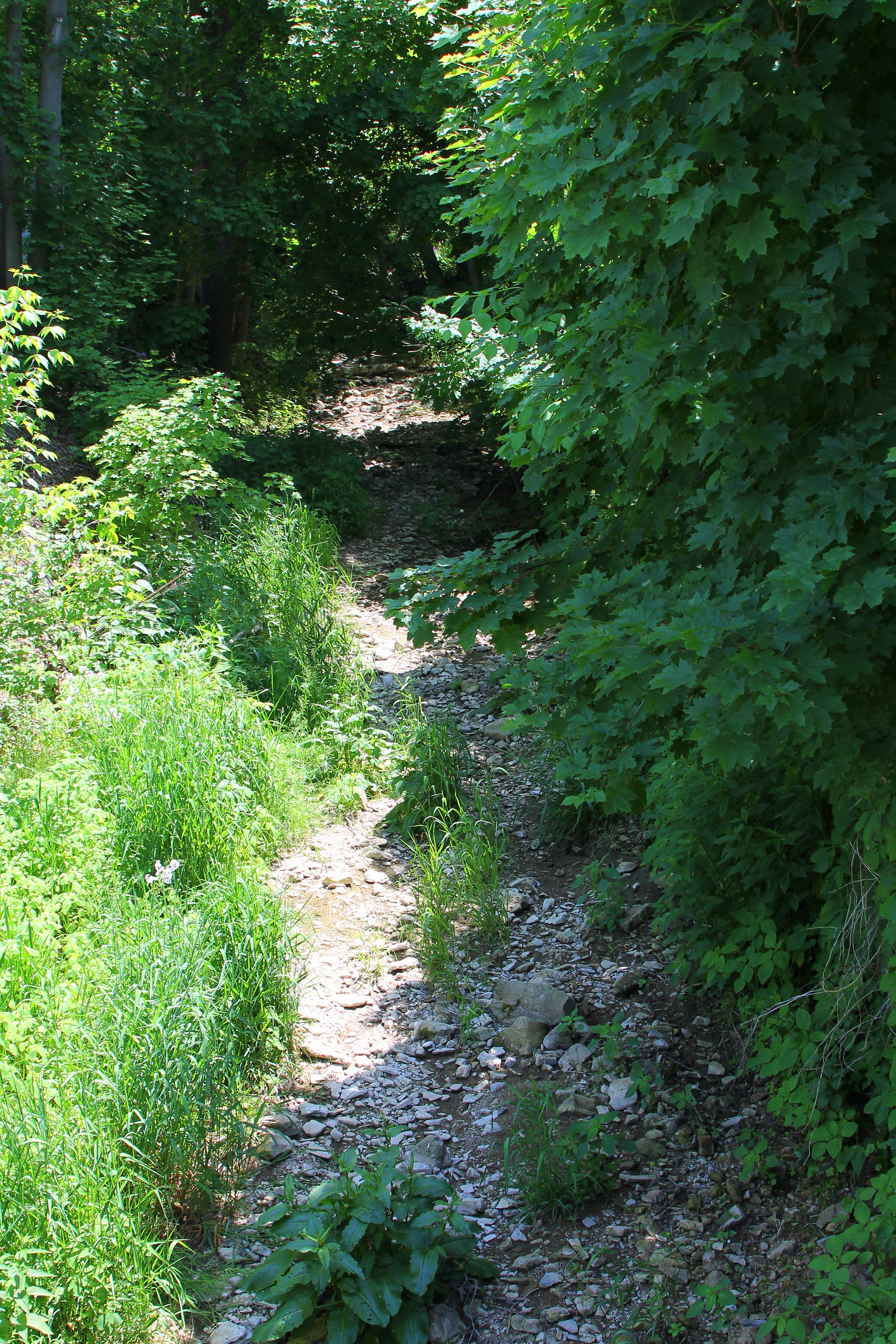
- Dalmatia Creek looking upstream in Dalmatia

Physical characteristics
- Source
  - location: base of a mountain in Lower Mahanoy Township, Northumberland County, Pennsylvania
  - elevation: 753 ft (230 m)
- Mouth
  - location: Susquehanna River at Dalmatia in Lower Mahanoy Township, Northumberland County, Pennsylvania
  - coordinates: 40°39′25″N 76°54′01″W
  - elevation: 400 ft (120 m)
- Length: 2.8 mi (4.5 km)
- Basin size: 2.80 mi^{2} (7.3 km^{2})

Basin features
- Progression: Susquehanna River → Chesapeake Bay
- Tributaries
  - left: Unt 17500, Unt 17501, Unt 17502, Unt 17503, Unt 17504, Unt 17505, Unt 17506

Dalmatia Creek is a tributary of the Susquehanna River in Northumberland County, Pennsylvania, in the United States. It is approximately 2.8 miles (4.5 km) long and flows through Lower Mahanoy Township. The watershed of the creek has an area of 2.80 square miles (7.3 km^{2}). The creek has no named tributaries, but several unnamed ones. Both it and its tributaries are designated as impaired waterbodies due to sedimentation/siltation from crop-related agriculture and vegetation removal. Streambank erosion also occurs in the watershed. The creek is in the Ridge and Valley physiographic province.

The main land use in the watershed of Dalmatia Creek is agricultural land, but forested land, low-intensity development, and transitional land are also present. The creek experienced flooding during Tropical Storm Agnes in 1972. A bridge carrying Pennsylvania Route 147 has been constructed across it in Dalmatia. The drainage basin of the creek is designated as a Warmwater Fishery and a Migratory Fishery.

== Course ==
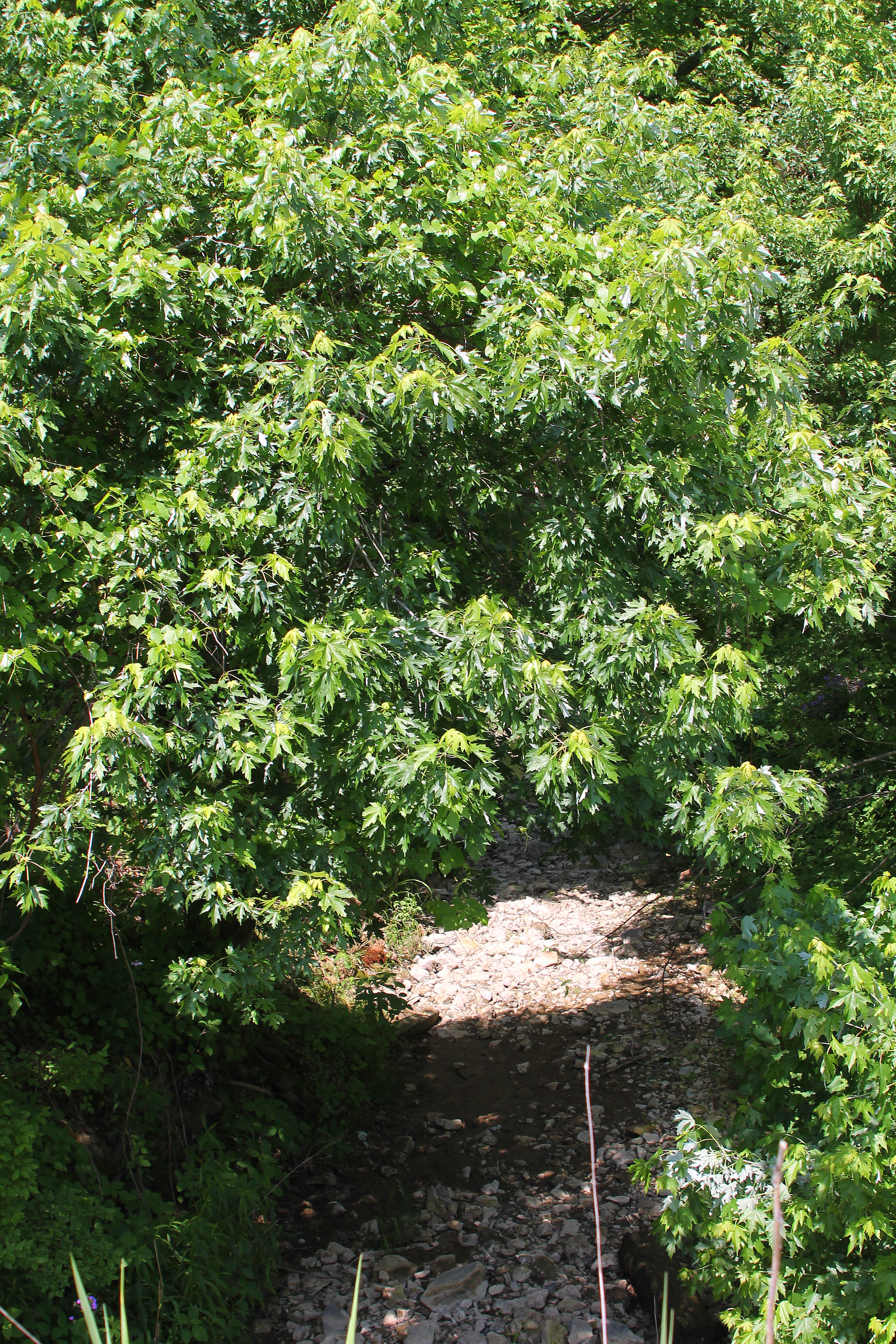
Dalmatia Creek looking downstream in Dalmatia

Dalmatia Creek begins at the base of a mountain in Lower Mahanoy Township. It flows north-northwest for a few tenths of a mile, entering a valley. The creek then flows west-southwest for a few tenths of a mile, receiving an unnamed tributary from the left before turning west. After several tenths of a mile, it turns west-southwest again for several tenths of a mile, receiving two more unnamed tributaries from the left, one of them extremely short. The creek then turns west for a few tenths of a mile, receiving another two unnamed tributaries from the left, before turning west-southwest. After several tenths of a mile, it turns west for a few tenths of a mile, receiving two more unnamed tributaries from the left and entering the census-designated place of Dalmatia. Here, the creek turns northwest for a few tenths of a mile before turning west. A short distance further downstream, it crosses Pennsylvania Route 147 and reaches its confluence with the Susquehanna River.

Dalmatia Creek joins the Susquehanna River 108.25 miles (174.21 km) upstream of its mouth.

=== Tributaries ===
Dalmatia Creek has no named tributaries. However, it does have seven unnamed tributaries. They are known as Unt 17500, Unt 17501, Unt 17502, Unt 17503, Unt 17504, Unt 17505, and Unt 17506. All of these streams are designated as impaired waterbodies for the same reasons as the main stem. Some tributaries suffer from little riparian buffering, or even none at all, and at least one has been plowed over. However, a tributary in the creek's upper reaches has some riparian buffering, reduced erosion, and relatively stable streambanks.

== Hydrology and climate ==
Dalmatia Creek is designated as an impaired waterbody. The cause of impairment is sedimentation/siltation and the probable sources of impairment are crop-related agriculture and removal of vegetation.

The peak annual discharge at the mouth of Dalmatia Creek has a 10 percent chance of reaching 630 cubic feet per second (18 m^{3}/s). It has a 2 percent chance of reaching 1,050 cubic feet per second (30 m^{3}/s) and a 1 percent chance of reaching 1,230 cubic feet per second (35 m^{3}/s). The peak annual discharge has a 0.2 percent chance of reaching 1,620 cubic feet per second (46 m^{3}/s). Some reaches of the creek are intermittent.

As of 2013, the total annual sediment load for Dalmatia Creek is 8,324,400 pounds (3,775,900 kg). Cropland is by far the largest source, accounting for 7,444,200 pounds (3,376,600 kg) per year. It is distantly followed by hay and pastures, which account for 638,200 pounds (289,500 kg). Forested land accounts for 84,000 pounds (38,000 kg) per year, while low-intensity development accounts for 82,000 pounds (37,000 kg) per year. Stream banks account for 56,400 pounds (25,600 kg) annually, while transitional land accounts for 19,600 pounds (8,900 kg). Pastures have the highest unit area load, while forests have the lowest. The total maximum daily load for sediment in the creek is 19,081 pounds (8,655 kg).

The average annual rate of precipitation in the watershed of Dalmatia Creek over a 19-year period was 39.30 inches (99.8 cm). The average annual rate of runoff over a 19-year period was 3.15 inches (8.0 cm).

== Geography and geology ==
The elevation near the mouth of Dalmatia Creek is 400 feet (120 m) above sea level. The elevation of the creek's source is 753 feet (230 m) above sea level. The highest elevations in the watershed are as high as 960 feet (290 m), while the lowest occur at the creek's mouth. The southern edge of the watershed is on Fisher Ridge.

Dalmatia Creek has been described as "a minute stream" and "barely a trickle" in A. Joseph Armstrong's 2000 book Trout Unlimited's Guide to Pennsylvania Limestone Streams.

Dalmatia Creek is in the Ridge and Valley physiographic province. The slopes in the watershed generally have a low gradient. This, combined with the lack of vegetation in agricultural areas, causes excessive runoff during precipitation events. Unprotected stream banks in the watershed lead to stream bank erosion and slumping. The banks are also undercut and/or deteriorated in some reaches; they are described as "deteriating [sic] and slumping" at the headwaters. There are also excessive sediment deposits in the creek.

The dominant hydrologic soil group in the watershed of Dalmatia Creek is B. The dominant surface geology is schist, a metamorphic rock, which underlies the entire watershed. The surface geology has little influence on the sediment loads in the creek. The natural fluvial geomorphology is channelized in some reaches. cobbles of chert of varying sizes have been observed on the eastern bank of the Susquehanna River, not far from the creek.

== Watershed ==
The watershed of Dalmatia Creek has an area of 2.80 square miles (7.3 km^{2}). The mouth of the creek is in the United States Geological Survey quadrangle of Dalmatia. However, its source is in the quadrangle of Pillow. The creek's mouth is located at Dalmatia. The settlement of Hickory Corners is also in the watershed.

Dalmatia Creek is entirely within Lower Mahanoy Township, as are all of its tributaries. There are approximately 5.0 miles (8.0 km) of streams in the watershed.

The dominant land use in the watershed of Dalmatia Creek is agricultural land, including cropland and hay/pastures; agricultural land occupies 56.9 percent of the watershed. Forested land makes up 34.0 percent of the watershed. Low-intensity development accounts for 8.7 percent of the watershed's area, while transitional land accounts for 0.2 percent. Tillage is done in the creek's agricultural areas, even in some intermittent reaches of the creek itself. The agricultural land includes slightly more hay and pastures than cropland, 514 acres (208 ha) versus 509 acres (206 ha).

Dalmatia Creek, along with numerous other streams in the area, experienced flooding during Tropical Storm Agnes in June 1972. Sometime after Tropical Storm Agnes, stream restoration was considered and/or carried out on Dalmatia Creek, in addition to reseeding 4.4 acres (1.8 ha) of stream banks in an effort to reduce erosion and siltation.

== History ==
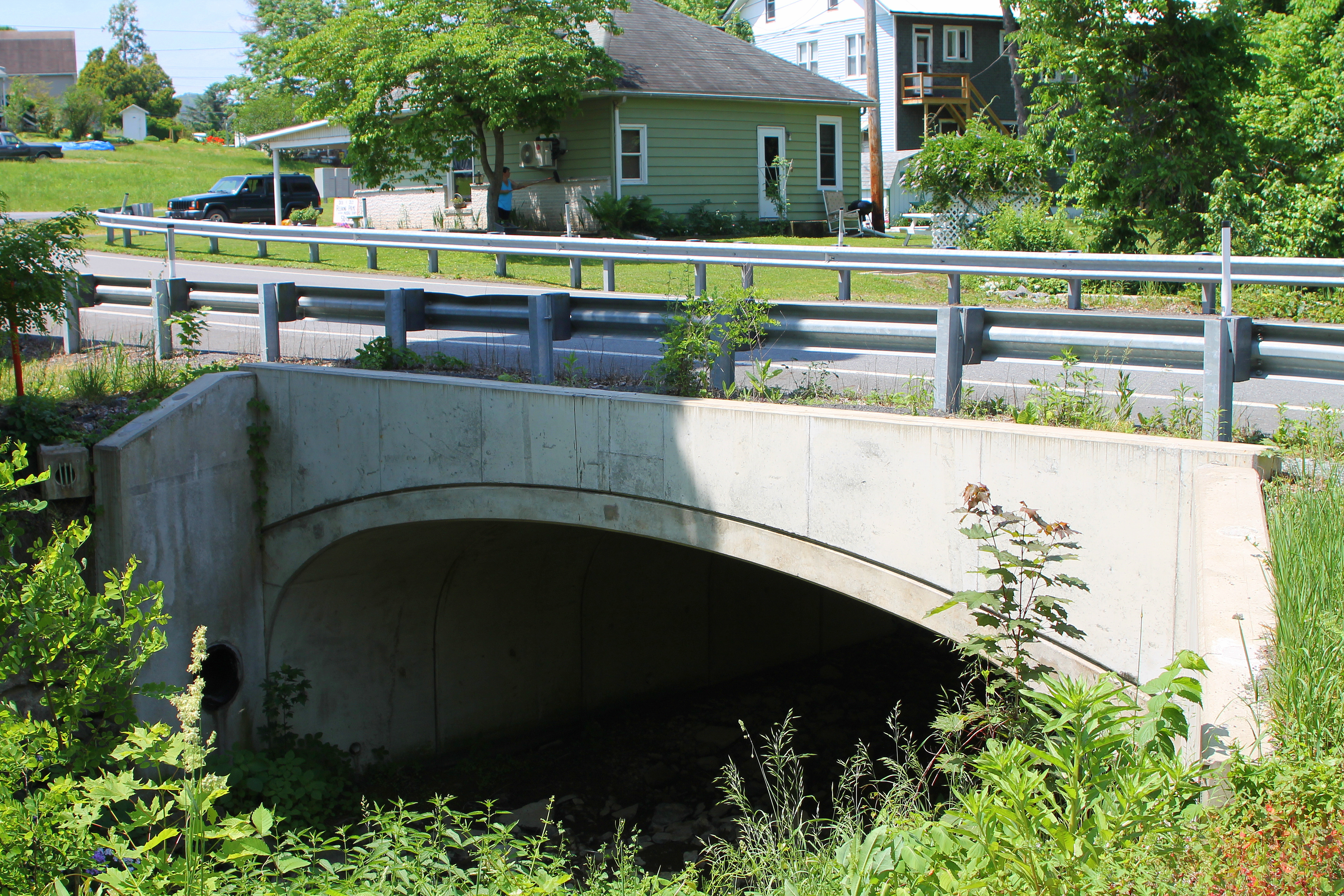
Bridge carrying Pennsylvania Route 147 over Dalmatia Creek

Dalmatia Creek was entered into the Geographic Names Information System on August 2, 1979. Its identifier in the Geographic Names Information System is 1172900.

A concrete culvert bridge carrying Pennsylvania Route 147 was constructed across Dalmatia Creek in 2011 in Dalmatia and is 27.9 feet (8.5 m) long.

In July 2012, the Lower Mahanoy Township Municipal Authority received a Water Obstructions and Encroachments permit to build, maintain, and operate an elevated platform for the control panel of the Dalmatia Creek grinder Pump Station near Dalmatia Creek itself. In August 2012, the Pennsylvania Department of Environmental Protection invited comments on its proposed Total Maximum Daily Load plan for Dalmatia Creek. However, no public comments were received.

== Biology ==
The drainage basin of Dalmatia Creek is designated as a Warmwater Fishery and a Migratory Fishery. The creek's designated use is aquatic life. In 2016, the Pennsylvania Fish and Boat Commission passed regulations affecting Dalmatia Creek from its mouth to a point 0.5 miles (0.80 km) upstream. This regulation forbade any attempt to target or catch bass between May 1 and June 17, with immediate catch and release being in effect for bass the rest of the year. However, the creek is not a trout fishery.

The riparian buffers of Dalmatia Creek are limited or nonexistent in agricultural areas. Cropland mowing occurs right up to the creek's banks in some areas. Additionally, livestock have access to the creek, and barn waste is flushed into the headwaters.

== See also ==
- Hoffer Creek, next tributary of the Susquehanna River going downriver
- Independence Run, next tributary of the Susquehanna River going upriver
- List of rivers of Pennsylvania
