= Upper Mahanoy Township, Pennsylvania =

Township in Pennsylvania, US

Coordinates: 40°43′00″N 76°37′59″W

- Township
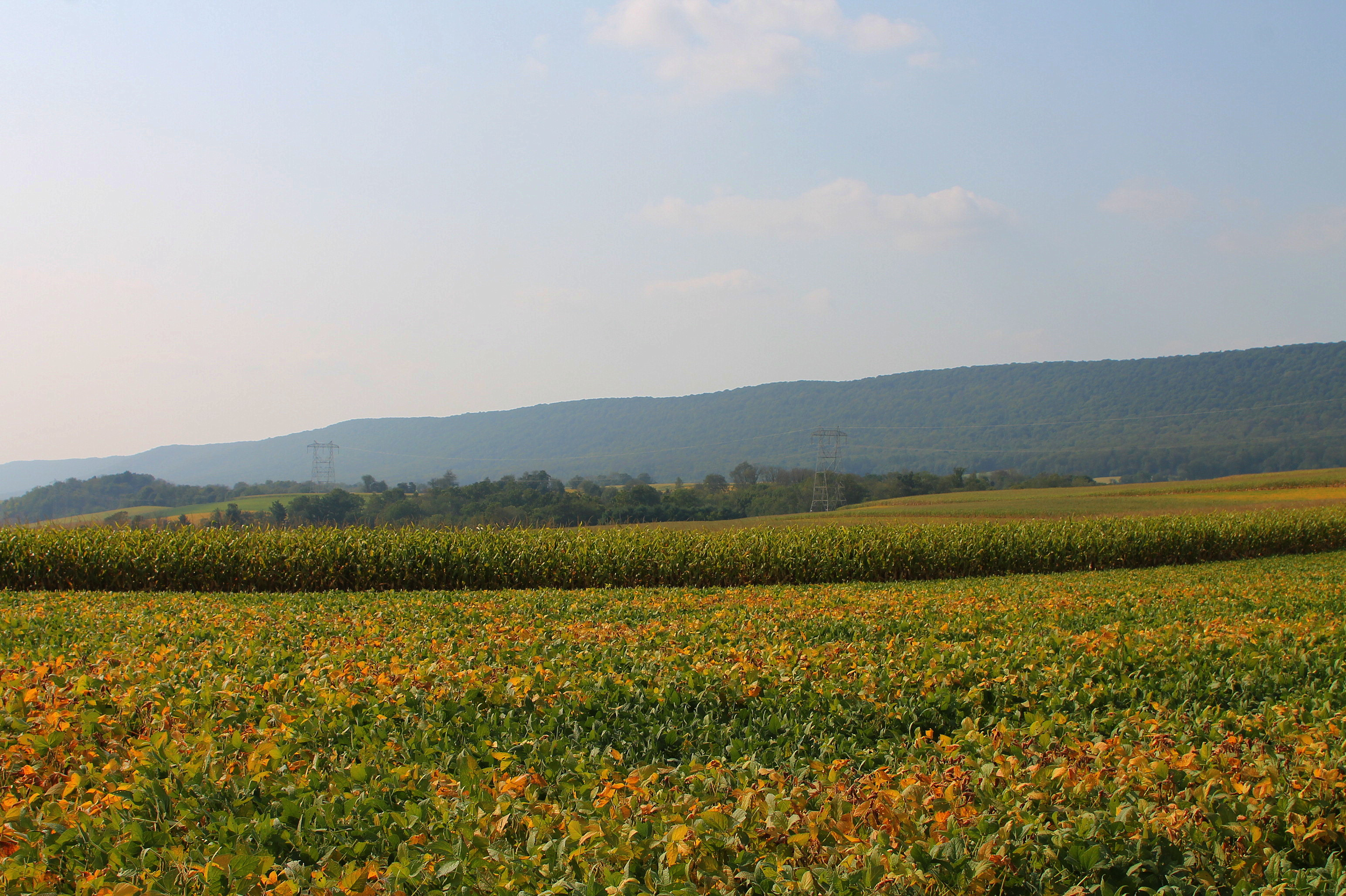
- Line Mountain in Upper Mahanoy Township

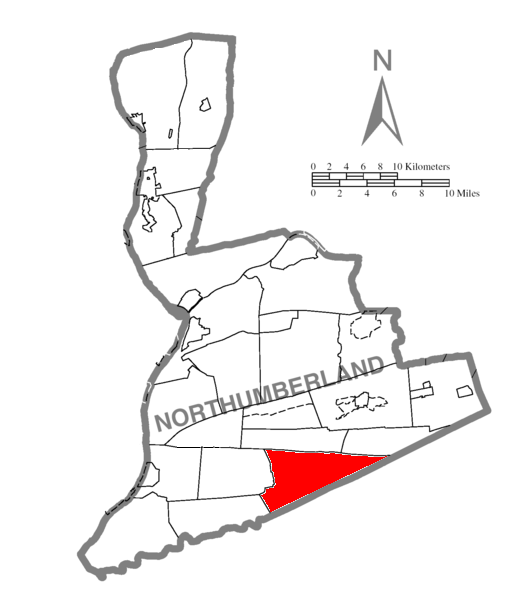
- Map of Northumberland County, Pennsylvania highlighting Upper Mahanoy Township

- Map of Northumberland County, Pennsylvania
- Country: United States
- State: Pennsylvania
- County: Northumberland
- Settled: 1777
- Incorporated: 1806

Government
  - Type: Board of Supervisors

Area
  - Total: 23.36 sq mi (60.50 km^{2})
  - Land: 23.34 sq mi (60.44 km^{2})
  - Water: 0.023 sq mi (0.06 km^{2})

Population (2010)
  - Total: 796
  - Estimate (2016): 779
  - Density: 33.4/sq mi (12.89/km^{2})
- Time zone: UTC-5 (Eastern (EST))
  - Summer (DST): UTC-4 (EDT)
- Area code: 570
- FIPS code: 42-097-79112

Upper Mahanoy Township is a township that is located in Northumberland County, Pennsylvania, United States. The population at the time of the 2010 Census was 796, an increase over the figure of 599 that was documented in 2000.

== Geography ==
According to the United States Census Bureau, the township has a total area of 23.4 square miles (60.5 km^{2}), all land.

== Demographics ==
Historical population
Census	Pop.	Note	%±
2010	796		—
2016 (est.)	779		−2.1%
U.S. Decennial Census

As of the census of 2000, there were 599 people, 223 households, and 171 families residing in the township.

The population density was 25.6 people per square mile (9.9/km^{2}). There were 247 housing units at an average density of 10.6/sq mi (4.1/km^{2}).

The racial makeup of the township was 99.67% White, 0.17% African American, and 0.17% from two or more races. Hispanic or Latino of any race were 0.67% of the population.

There were 223 households, out of which 34.1% had children under the age of eighteen living with them; 67.7% were married couples living together, 5.8% had a female householder with no husband present, and 23.3% were non-families. 18.8% of all households were made up of individuals, and 11.2% had someone living alone who was sixty-five years of age or older.

The average household size was 2.69 and the average family size was 3.06.

Within the township, the population was spread out, with 26.4% of residents who under the age of 18, 6.0% from 18 to 24, 26.2% from 25 to 44, 24.4% from 45 to 64, and 17.0% who were 65 years of age or older. The median age was 40 years.

For every 100 females, there were 107.3 males. For every 100 females age 18 and over, there were 104.2 males.

The median income for a household in the township was $34,250, and the median income for a family was $38,500. Males had a median income of $30,500 compared with that of $22,188 for females.

The per capita income for the township was $13,387.

Approximately 5.2% of families and 9.3% of the population were living below the poverty line, including 15.2% of those who were under the age of eighteen and 3.8% of those who were aged sixty-five or older.

== Gallery ==
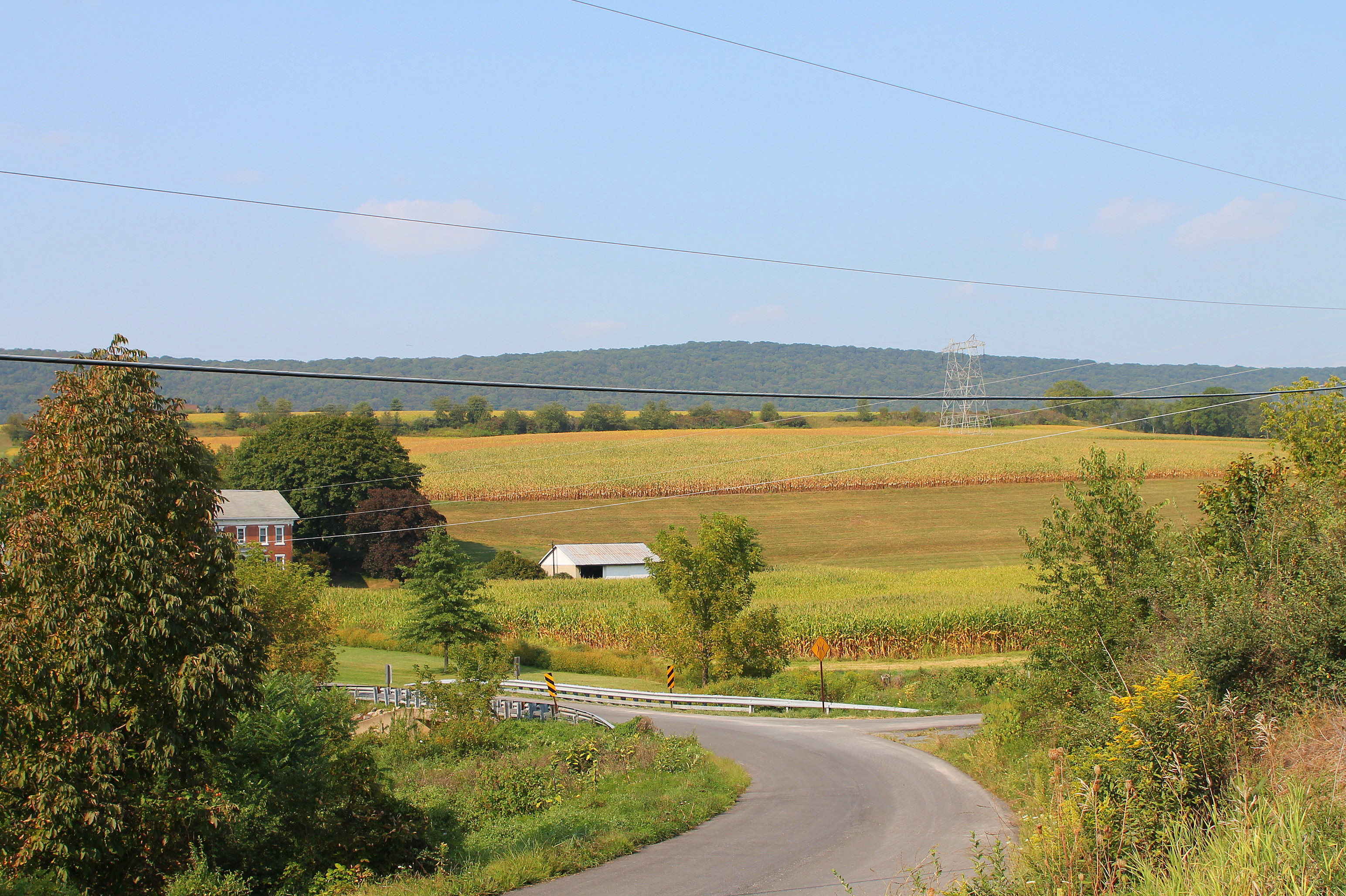
Upper Mahanoy Township

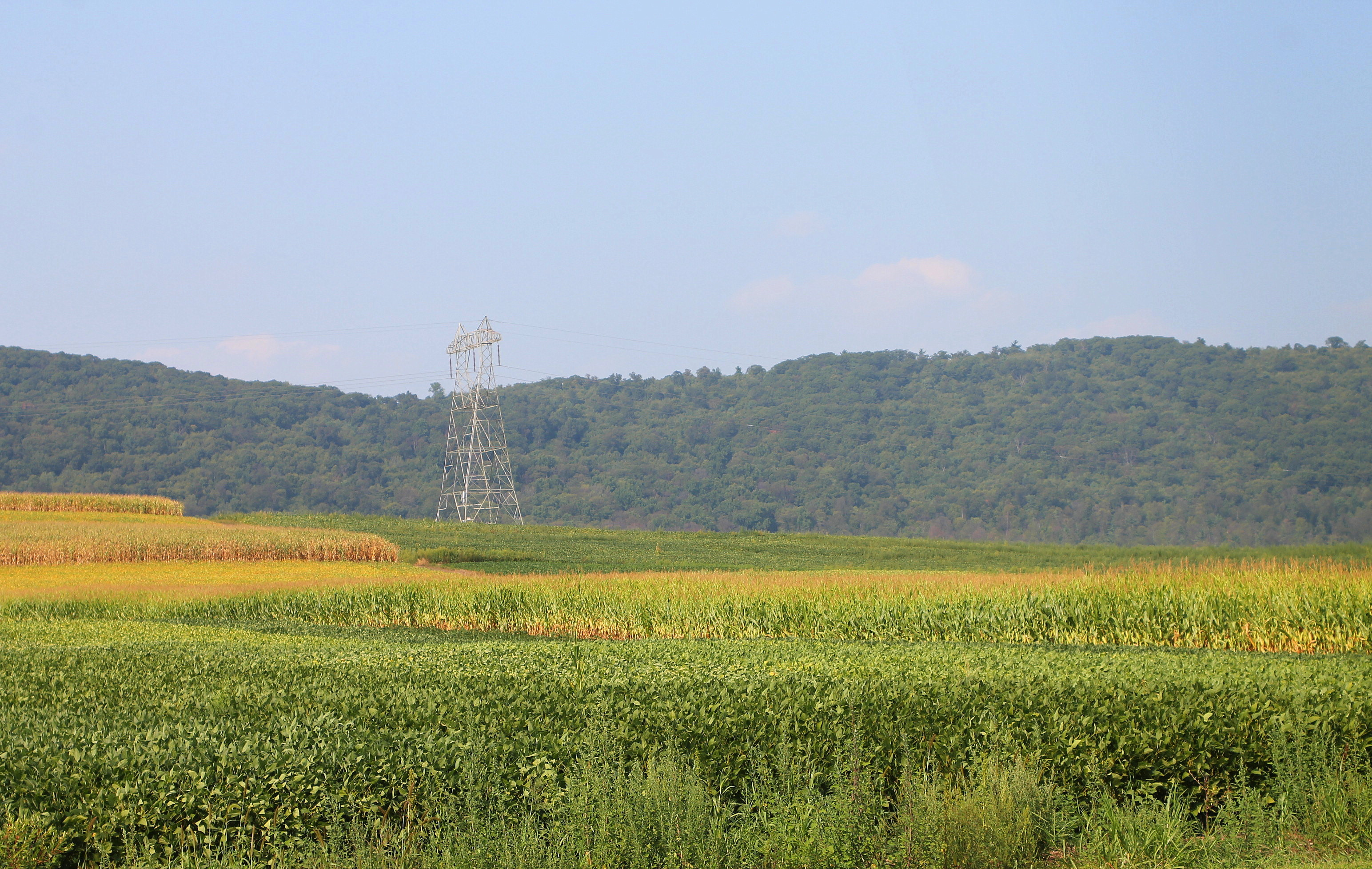
Upper Mahanoy Township
