= Line Mountain Jr./Sr. High School =

Coordinates: 40.6676°N 76.8275°W

Line Mountain High School
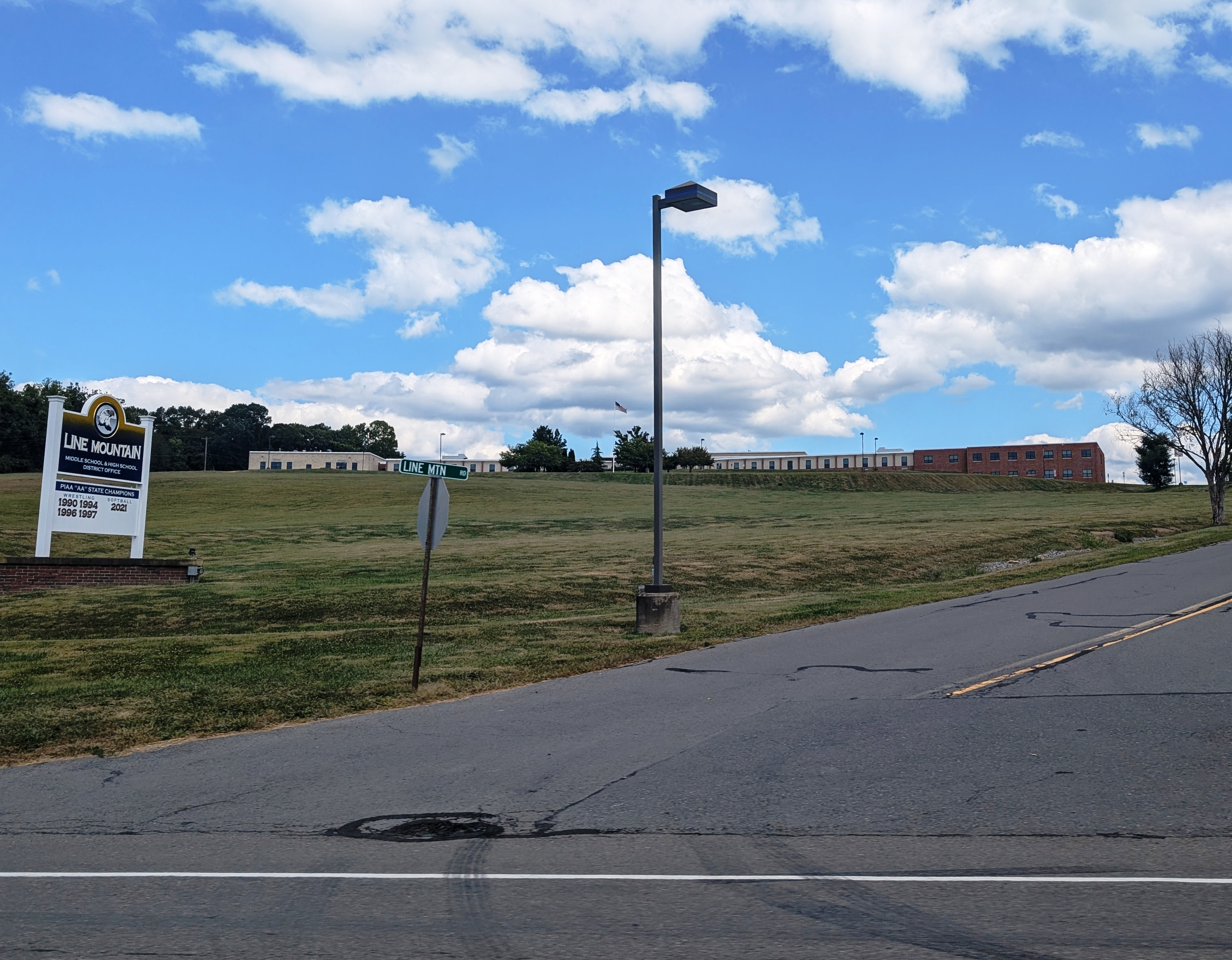

Location
- 187 Line Mountain Road; Herndon, Northumberland County, Pennsylvania 17830-7325; United States

Information
- Type: Public
- School district: Line Mountain School District
- Superintendent: David M Campbell
- Principal: Jeffrey Roadcap; Carl Krause, Ast principal
- Grades: 9th–12th (2014), 7th – 12th (2013
- Enrollment: 381 pupils 9th–12th (2016)
- Website: https://www.linemountain.com/schools/highschool/

The Line Mountain High School is a small, rural public high school located at 187 Line Mountain Road, Herndon, Northumberland County, Pennsylvania. In 2014, the school was reorganized as a 7th–12th grade school. It shares the building with the district's only middle school. In 2014, its enrollment was reported as 365 pupils in 9th through 12th grades. The school is the sole high school in the Line Mountain School District.

In 2013, Line Mountain Junior/Senior High School was a combined junior and senior high school. Line Mountain High school students may choose to attend Northumberland County Career Technology Center for training in the trades. The Central Susquehanna Intermediate Unit provides the district with a wide variety of services such as specialized education for disabled students and hearing, speech, and visual disability services, drivers-education road classes, and professional development for staff and faculty.

Line Mountain High School's mascot is the Eagle and their colors are royal blue and gold with a trim of red.

== Extracurriculars ==
Line Mountain School District offers a variety of clubs, activities, and sports. The school provides a National Honor Society program for students whose GPA is 90% or higher in 10th through 12th grades.

=== Sports ===
The district provides a weight room for athletes. The district funds:

Boys:

- Baseball – AA varsity and junior varsity teams
- Basketball – AAA
- Football – AA
- Soccer – A
- Wrestling – AA

Girls:

- Basketball – AA
- Field hockey – A
- Soccer – A
- Softball – AA

Junior high school sports:

Boys:

- Basketball
- Wrestling

Girls:

- Basketball
- Field hockey

According to PIAA directory July 2017, the track and field program was discontinued in 2017. Line Mountain and Upper Dauphin Area had a co-operative agreement for track and field until 2020, when Upper Dauphin merged programs with Millersburg Area. In 2021, Line Mountain was seeking to send athletes to Shamokin area for track and field.
