= Washington Township, Northumberland County, Pennsylvania =

Township in Pennsylvania, US

Coordinates: 40°43′00″N 76°45′29″W

- Township
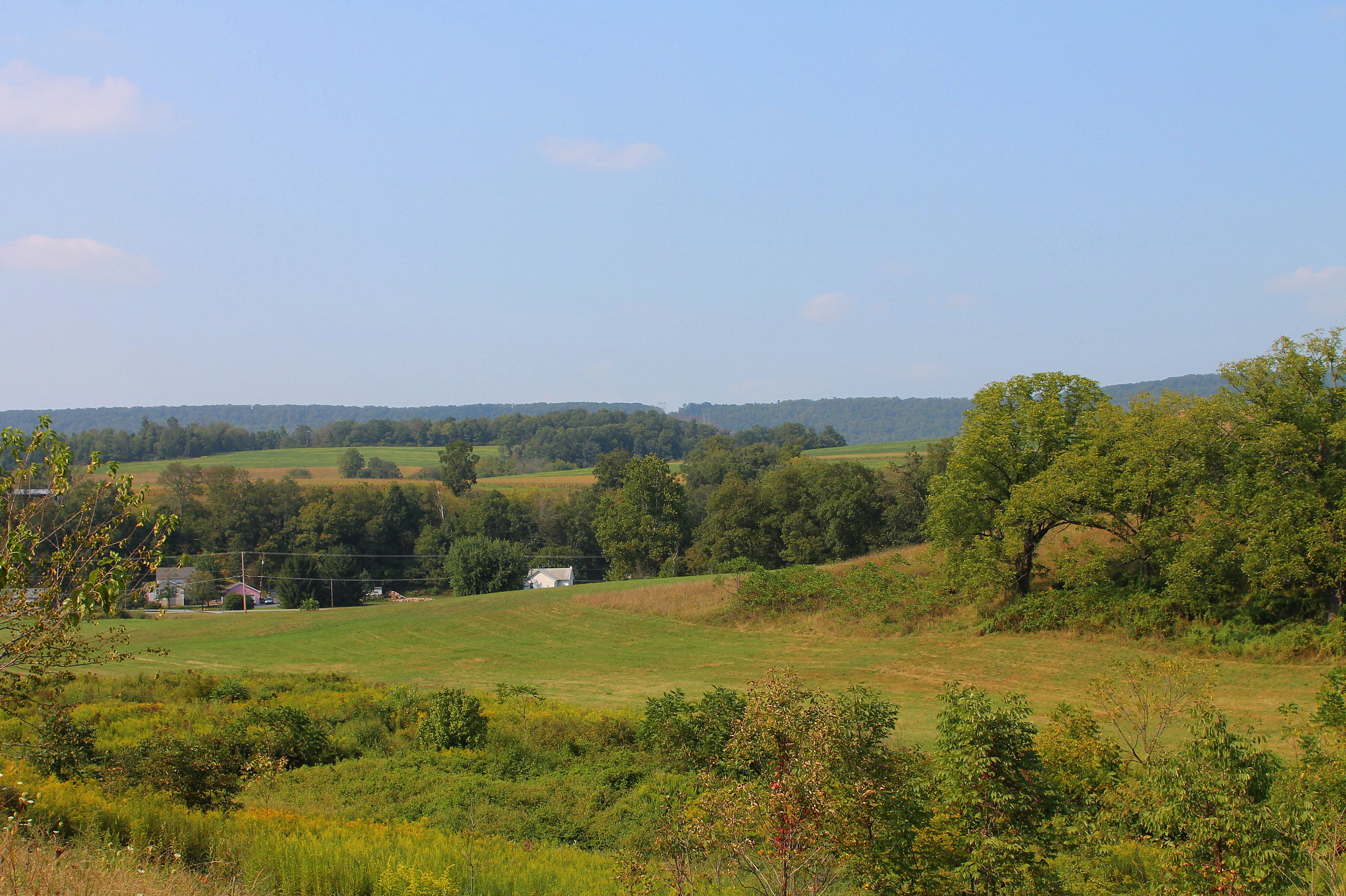
- Scenery of Washington Township

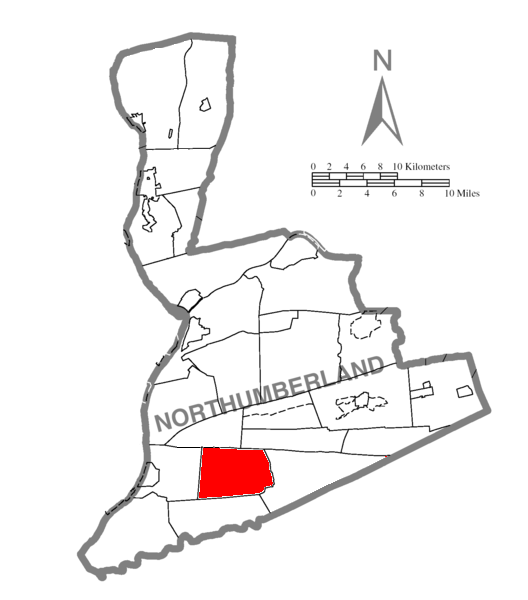
- Map of Northumberland County, Pennsylvania highlighting Washington Township

- Map of Northumberland County, Pennsylvania
- Country: United States
- State: Pennsylvania
- County: Northumberland
- Settled: 1774
- Incorporated: 1856

Government
  - Type: Board of Supervisors

Area
  - Total: 18.10 sq mi (46.89 km^{2})
  - Land: 18.09 sq mi (46.86 km^{2})
  - Water: 0.012 sq mi (0.03 km^{2})

Population (2010)
  - Total: 746
  - Estimate (2016): 742
  - Density: 41.0/sq mi (15.84/km^{2})
- Time zone: UTC-5 (Eastern (EST))
  - Summer (DST): UTC-4 (EDT)
- Area code: 570
- FIPS code: 42-097-81304

Washington Township is a township that is located in Northumberland County, Pennsylvania, United States. The population at the time of the 2010 Census was 746, an increase over the figure of 660 that was tabulated in 2000.

Himmel's Church Covered Bridge is located within the township.

== History ==
The Himmel's Church Covered Bridge was listed on the National Register of Historic Places in 1979.

== Geography ==
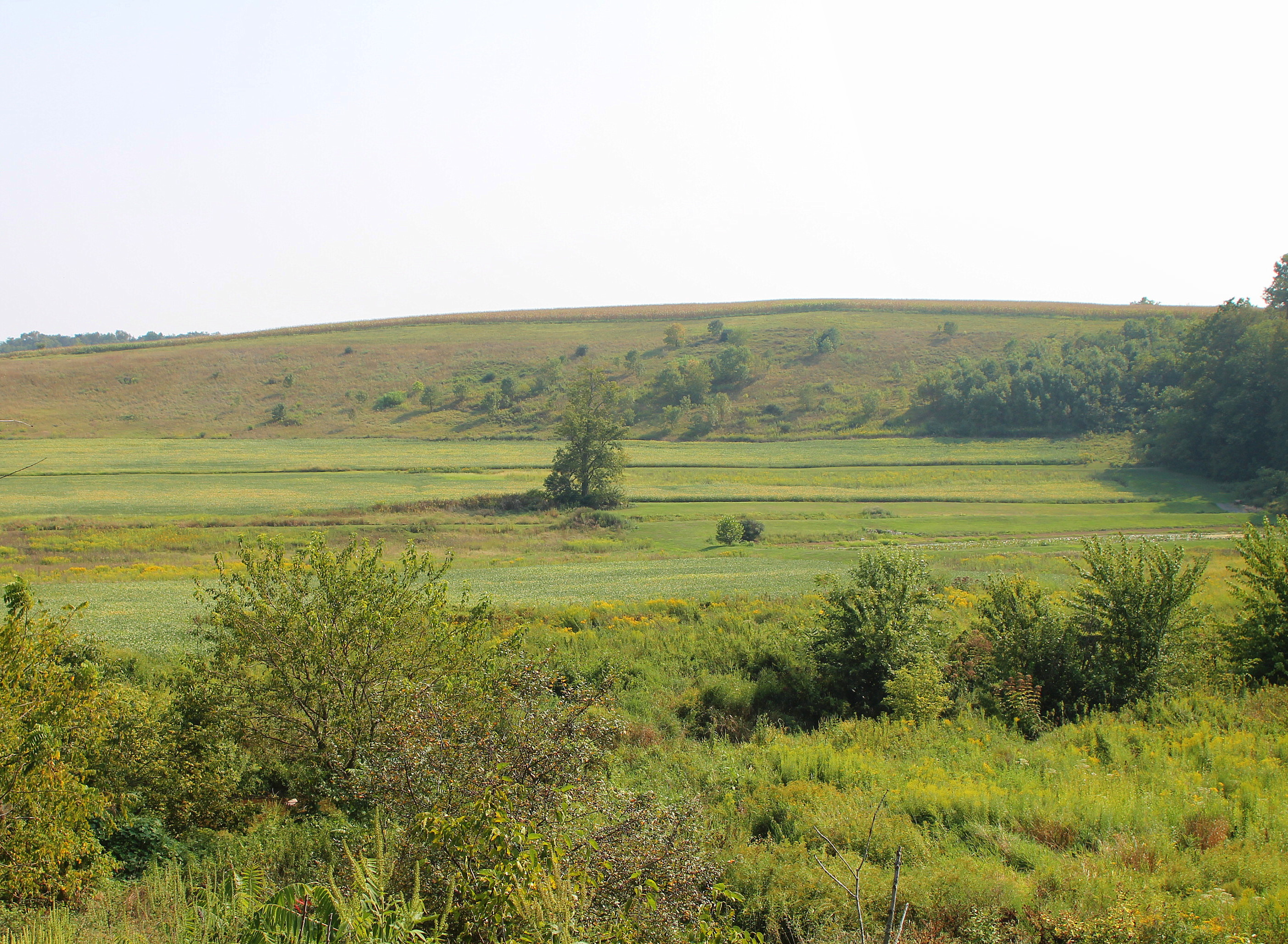
Fields and hills in Washington Township

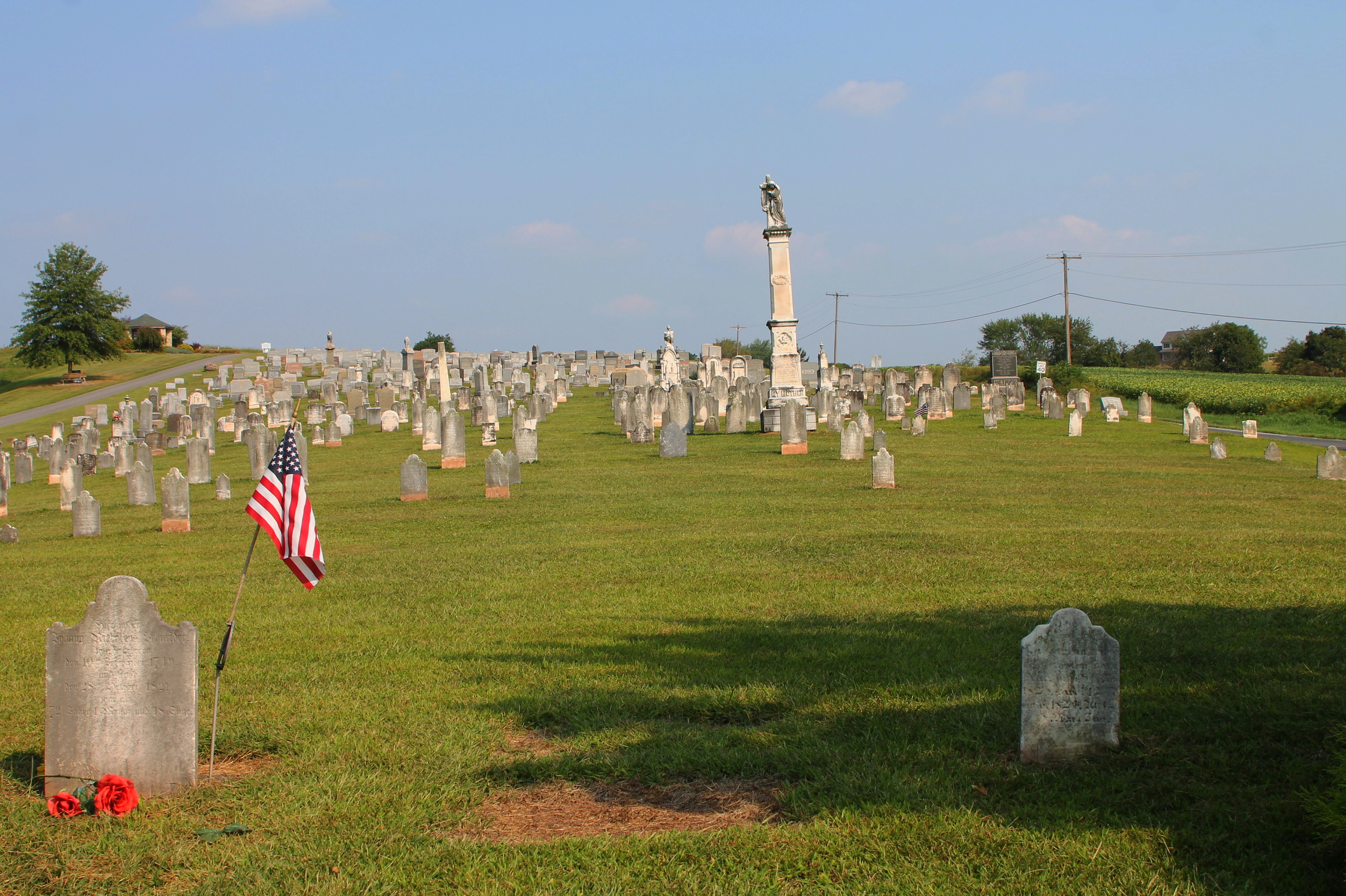
Himmel's Cemetery, Washington Township

According to the United States Census Bureau, the township has a total area of 18.1 square miles (46.9 km^{2}), all land.

== Demographics ==
Historical population
Census	Pop.	Note	%±
2010	746		—
2016 (est.)	742		−0.5%
U.S. Decennial Census

As of the census of 2000, there were 660 people, 263 households, and 199 families residing in the township.

The population density was 36.4 inhabitants per square mile (14.1/km^{2}). There were 283 housing units at an average density of 15.6/sq mi (6.0/km^{2}).

The racial makeup of the township was 99.70% White, 0.15% from other races, and 0.15% from two or more races. Hispanic or Latino of any race were 0.15% of the population.

There were 263 households, out of which 30.4% had children who were under the age of eighteen living with them; 65.4% were married couples living together, 6.8% had a female householder with no husband present, and 24.3% were non-families. Of all of the households that were documented, 21.3% were made up of individuals, and 14.8% had someone living alone who was sixty-five years of age or older.

The average household size was 2.51 and the average family size was 2.94.

Within the township, the population was spread out, with 23.3% of residents who were under the age of eighteen, 6.1% who were aged eighteen to twenty-four, 26.7% who were aged twenty-five to forty-four, 27.6% who were aged forty-five to sixty-four, and 16.4% who were sixty-five years of age or older. The median age was forty-two years.

For every one hundred females, there were 103.7 males. For every one hundred females who were aged eighteen or older, there were 96.9 males.

The median income for a household in the township was $39,000, and the median income for a family was $49,625. Males had a median income of $33,036 compared with that of $21,023 for females.

The per capita income for the township was $17,675.

Approximately 5.6% of families and 7.9% of the population were living below the poverty line, including 13.8% of those who were under the age of eighteen and 11.1% of those who were aged sixty-five or older.
