= Dalmatia, Pennsylvania =

Unincorporated community in Pennsylvania, US

Coordinates: 40°39′15″N 76°54′06″W

- census-designated place
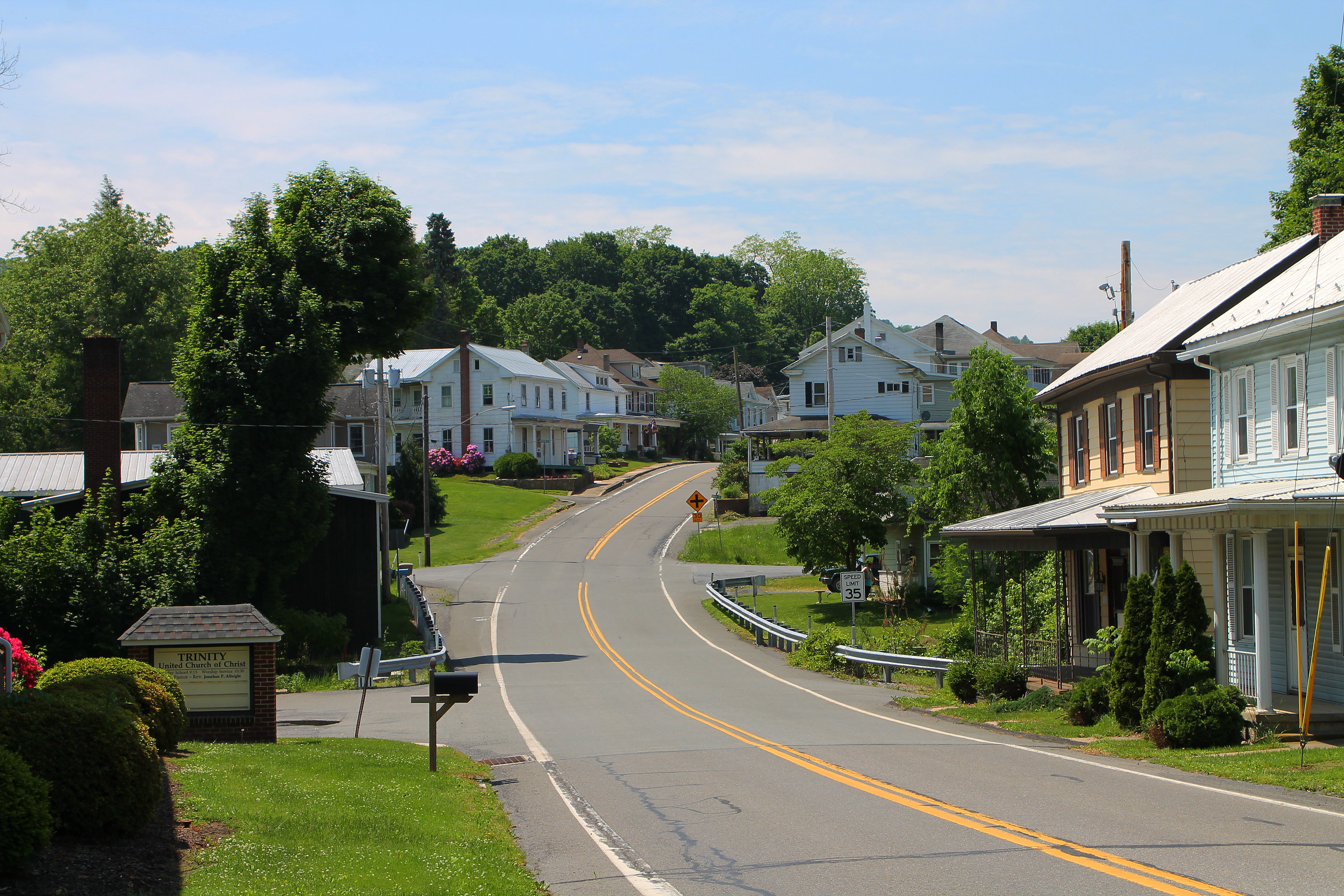
- Pennsylvania Route 147 in Dalmatia
- Interactive map of Dalmatia, Pennsylvania
- Country: United States
- State: Pennsylvania
- County: Northumberland
- First settled: 1798

Area
  - Total: 0.78 sq mi (2.03 km^{2})
  - Land: 0.68 sq mi (1.77 km^{2})
  - Water: 0.10 sq mi (0.27 km^{2})

Population (2020)
  - Total: 475
  - Density: 697.0/sq mi (269.11/km^{2})
- Time zone: UTC-5 (Eastern (EST))
  - Summer (DST): UTC-4 (EDT)
- ZIP codes: 17017
- Area code: 570
- FIPS code: 42-18080

Dalmatia is a census-designated place located in Lower Mahanoy Township, Northumberland County in the state of Pennsylvania. The community is located along Pennsylvania Route 147 in southwestern Northumberland County, along the Susquehanna River. As of the 2010 census the population was 488 residents.

== History ==
The community was initially founded in 1798 under the name "Georgetown" before being renamed "Dalmatia", after the historical region of Dalmatia, located in contemporary Croatia. The change seems to have been because of an attempt by the U.S. Postal Services to establish a post office in the year 1817, which failed due to the fact that the name "Georgetown" was too common. This prompted the locals to change the name, citing its alleged "resemblance to the Dalmatian coast".

== Demographics ==
Historical population
Census	Pop.	Note	%±
2020	475		—
U.S. Decennial Census

== Education ==
It is in the Line Mountain School District. The district's comprehensive secondary school is Line Mountain Jr./Sr. High School.
