= Dalmatian =

Dalmatian may refer to:

- Dalmatia, a region mainly in the southern part of modern Croatia
  - Dalmatian language, an extinct Romance language
  - Dalmatian (South Slavic), one of the historical names for proto-Serbo-Croatian
  - Dalmatian identity, a historical identity in the region
  - Dalmatian dog, a breed of dog originating in this region
- Dalmatian (band), a South Korean boy band
  - Dalmatian (EP), its self-titled EP
- Dalmatian pelican, a large bird native to central Europe

== See also ==
- Dalmatae, Ancient Illyrian tribe
- 101 Dalmatians (franchise)
