= Herndon, Pennsylvania =

Borough in Pennsylvania, US

- Borough
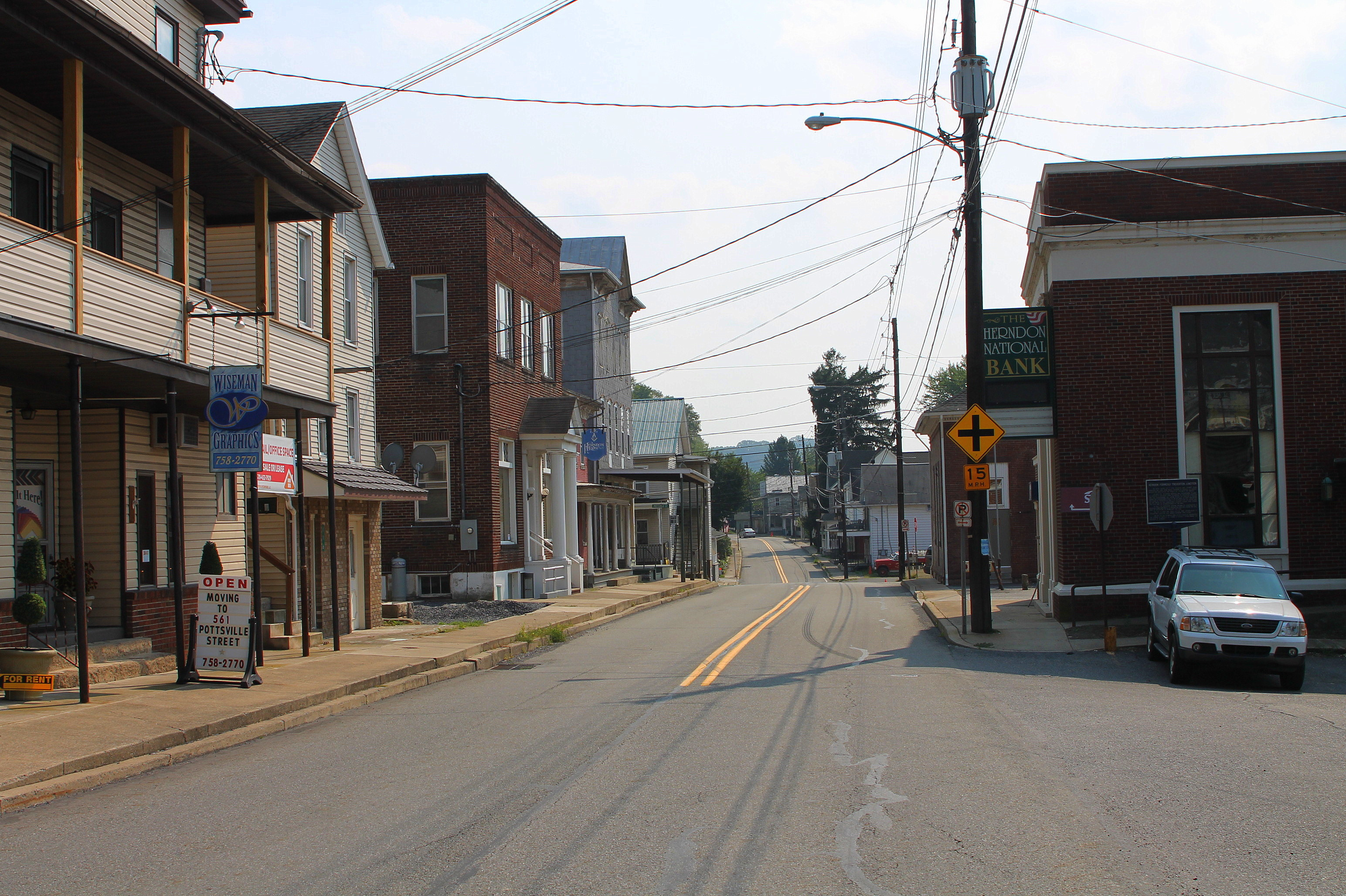
- Main Street (PA 147) in Herndon, September 2015

- Location of Herndon in Northumberland County, Pennsylvania.

- Location on Herndon in Pennsylvania Herndon (the United States)
- Coordinates: 40°42′15″N 76°50′36″W
- Country: United States
- State: Pennsylvania
- County: Northumberland
- Settled: 1827
- Incorporated: 1902

Area
  - Total: 1.80 sq mi (4.66 km^{2})
  - Land: 0.79 sq mi (2.05 km^{2})
  - Water: 1.01 sq mi (2.61 km^{2})
- Elevation (center of borough): 440 ft (130 m)
- Highest elevation (eastern boundary of borough): 840 ft (260 m)
- Lowest elevation (Susquehanna River): 415 ft (126 m)

Population (2020)
  - Total: 347
  - Density: 438.6/sq mi (169.36/km^{2})
- Time zone: UTC-5 (Eastern (EST))
  - Summer (DST): UTC-4 (EDT)
- ZIP code: 17830
- Area codes: 570 and 272
- FIPS code: 42-34080
- Website: https://herndonborough.com

Herndon, formerly Trevorton Junction, is a borough along the Susquehanna River in Northumberland County, Pennsylvania, United States. Herndon was first founded by Robert A. Parrish in 1840. The town was later named for Naval commander William Lewis Herndon, who died in 1857 while trying to rescue passengers from his sinking ship. As of the 2020 census, Herndon had a population of 347.

== Geography ==
Herndon is located at 40°42′15″N 76°50′36″W (40.704241, -76.843212).

According to the United States Census Bureau, the borough has a total area of 1.8 square miles (4.7 km^{2}), of which 0.8 square miles (2.1 km^{2}) is land and 1.0 square mile (2.6 km^{2}) (55.06%) is water.

== Demographics ==
Historical population
Census	Pop.	Note	%±
1880	306		—
1910	620		—
1920	656		5.8%
1930	699		6.6%
1940	687		−1.7%
1950	677		−1.5%
1960	622		−8.1%
1970	507		−18.5%
1980	483		−4.7%
1990	422		−12.6%
2000	383		−9.2%
2010	324		−15.4%
2020	347		7.1%

At the 2000 census there were 383 people, 173 households, and 106 families residing in the borough. The population density was 477.6 inhabitants per square mile (184.4/km^{2}). There were 192 housing units at an average density of 239.4 per square mile (92.4/km^{2}). The racial makeup of the borough was 97.91% White, 1.83% African American, and 0.26% from two or more races. There were 173 households, 20.2% had children under the age of 18 living with them, 56.1% were married couples living together, 4.0% had a female householder with no husband present, and 38.2% were non-families. 34.7% of households were made up of individuals, and 18.5% were one person aged 65 or older. The average household size was 2.21 and the average family size was 2.83.

In the borough the population was spread out, with 18.5% under the age of 18, 7.0% from 18 to 24, 27.9% from 25 to 44, 24.5% from 45 to 64, and 21.9% 65 or older. The median age was 43 years. For every 100 females, there were 84.1 males. For every 100 females age 18 and over, there were 90.2 males.

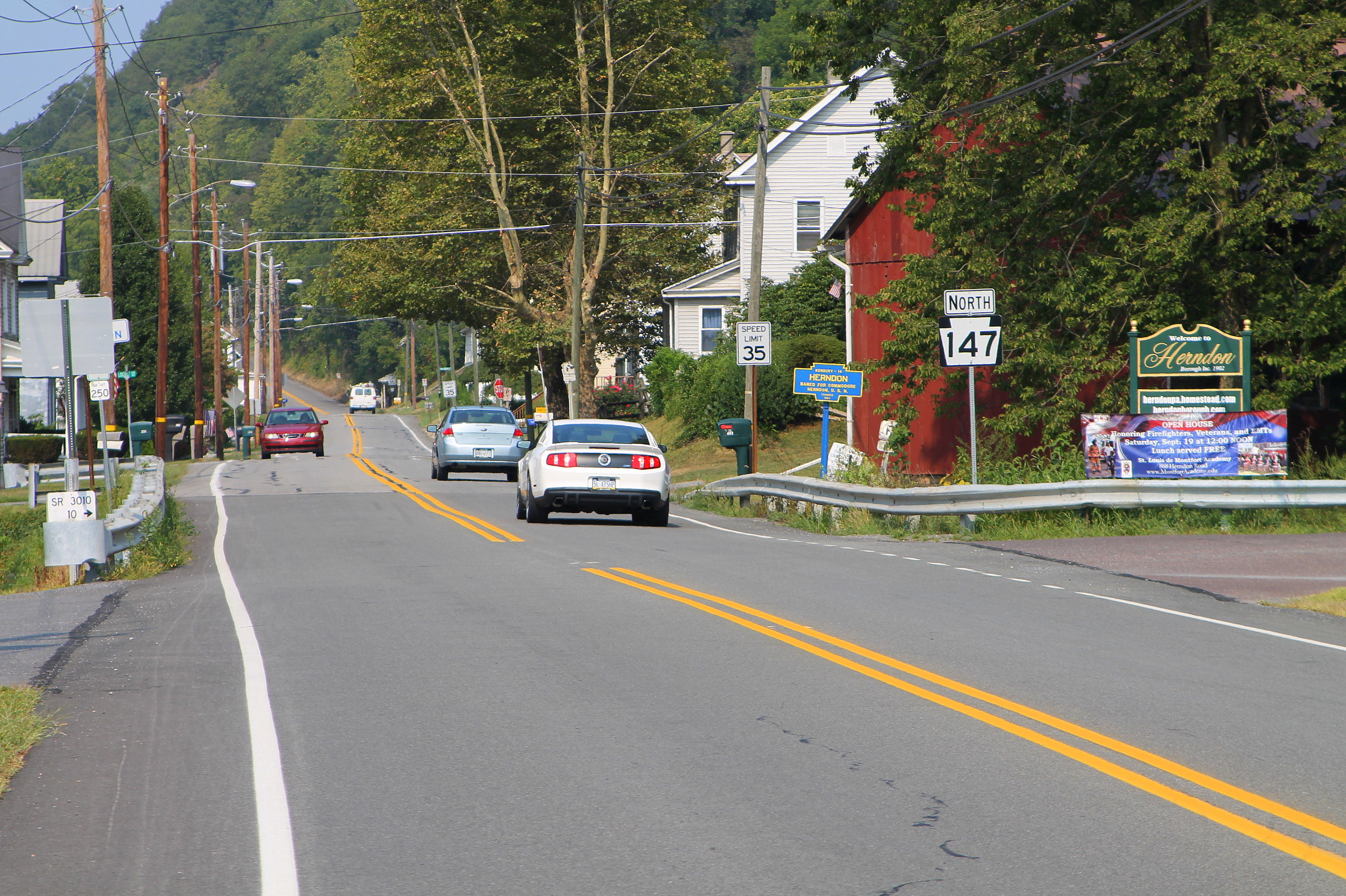
Entering Herndon from the south on Pennsylvania Route 147, September 2015

The median household income was $37,750 and the median family income was $44,063. Males had a median income of $29,875 versus $17,969 for females. The per capita income for the borough was $23,156. About 5.7% of families and 9.4% of the population were below the poverty line, including 9.1% of those under age 18 and 22.1% of those age 65 or over.

== Education ==
It is in the Line Mountain School District. Herndon is served by Line Mountain Jr./Sr. High School, part of the school district.

== See also ==
- List of towns and boroughs in Pennsylvania
