= Chapman Township, Snyder County, Pennsylvania =

Township in Pennsylvania, United States

Coordinates: 40°41′00″N 76°55′59″W

- Township
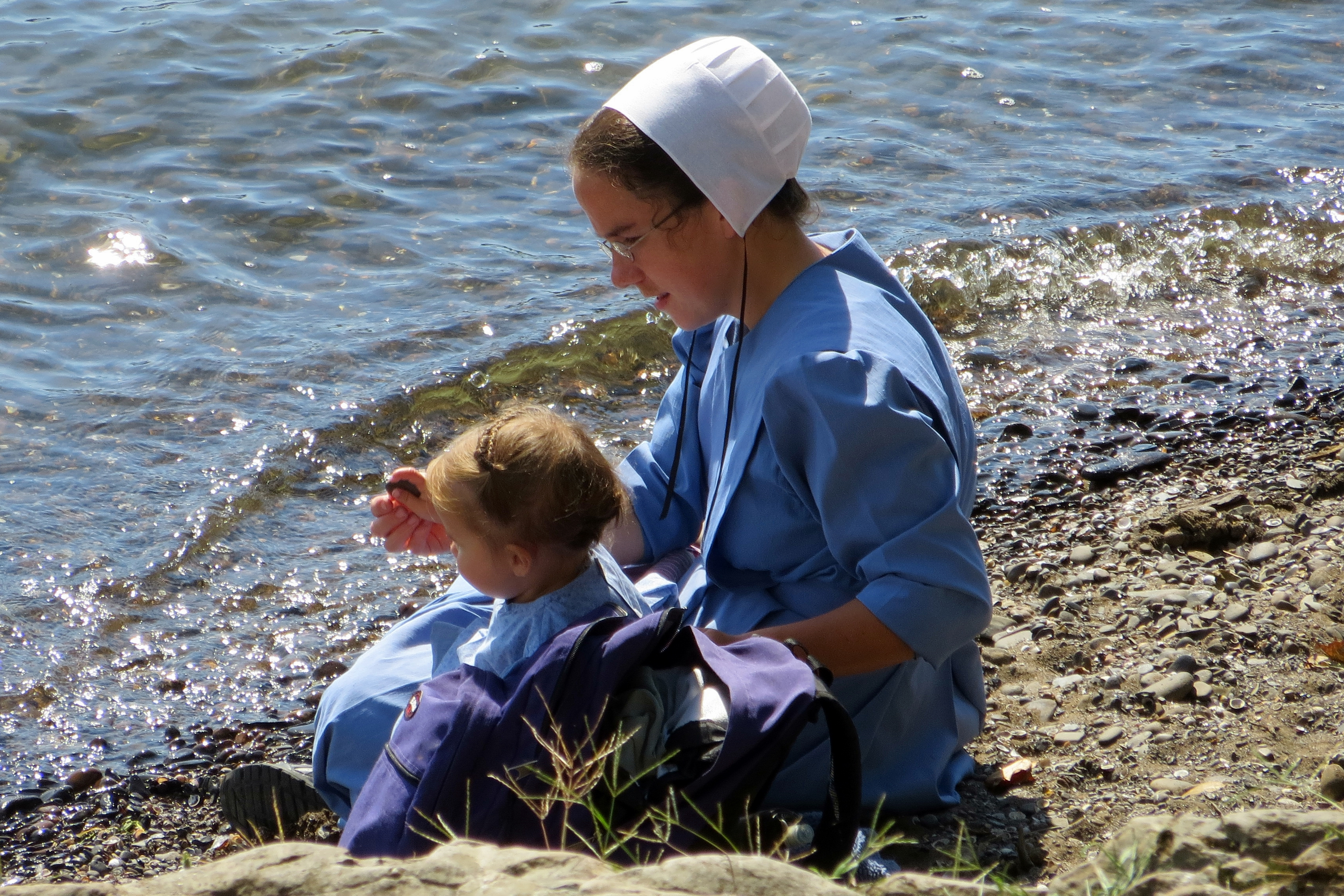
- Mother and child, McKee's Half Falls Rest Area

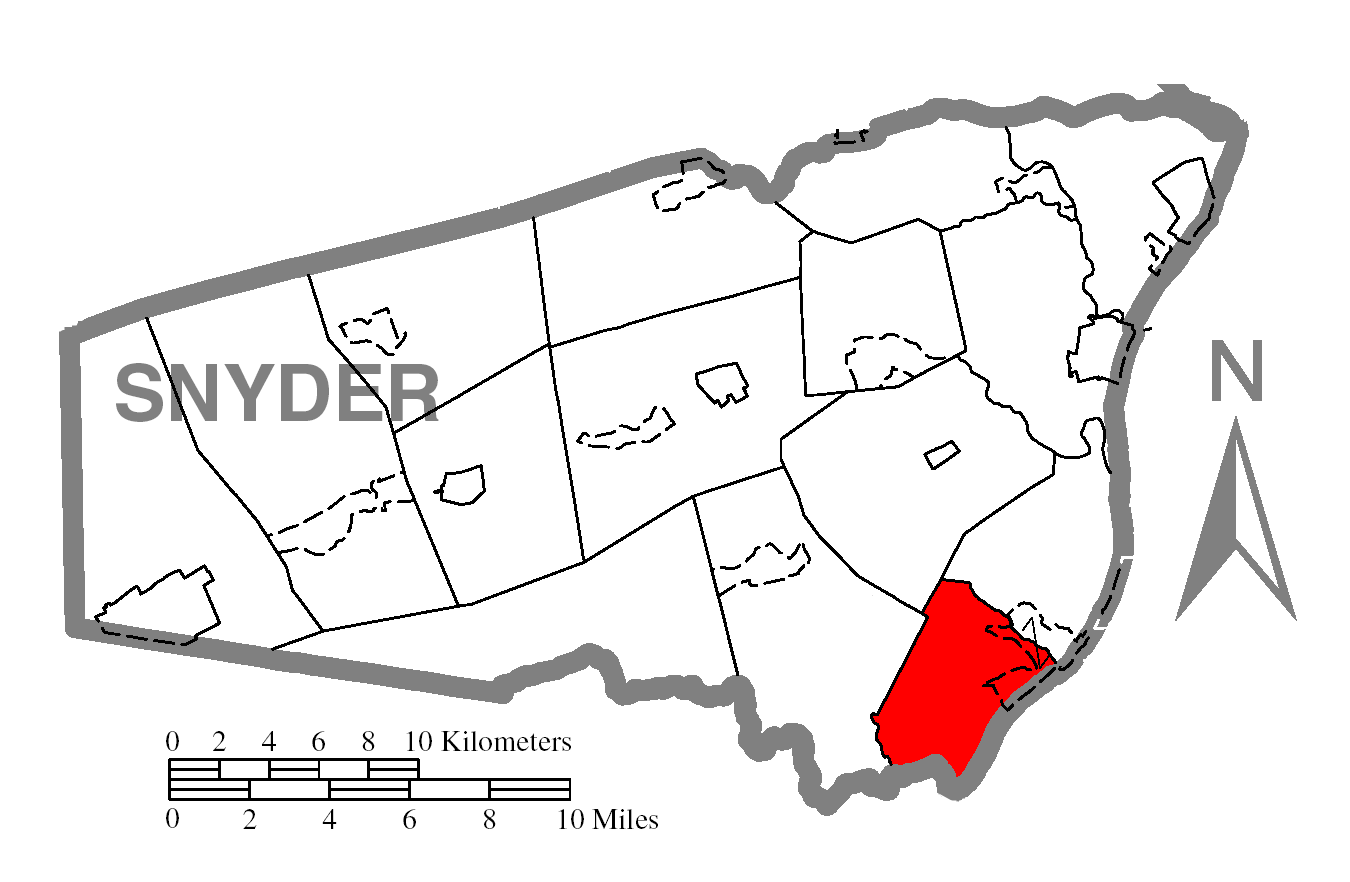
- Map of Snyder County, Pennsylvania highlighting Chapman Township

- Map of Snyder County, Pennsylvania
- Country: United States
- State: Pennsylvania
- County: Snyder
- Settled: 1744
- Incorporated: 1820

Area
  - Total: 13.58 sq mi (35.18 km^{2})
  - Land: 13.53 sq mi (35.05 km^{2})
  - Water: 0.050 sq mi (0.13 km^{2})

Population (2020)
  - Total: 1,565 ▲
  - Estimate (2022): 1,575
  - Density: 118.1/sq mi (45.59/km^{2})
- Time zone: UTC-5 (Eastern (EST))
  - Summer (DST): UTC-4 (EDT)
- FIPS code: 42-109-12672
- Website: Chapman Township

Chapman Township is a township in Snyder County, Pennsylvania, United States. The population was 1,565 at the 2020 census.

== Geography ==
According to the United States Census Bureau, the township has a total area of 13.3 square miles (34 km^{2}), all land.

Chapman Township is bordered by Washington Township to the northwest, Union Township to the northeast, the Susquehanna River to the east, Juniata County to the south and Perry Township to the west.

The census-designated place of Port Trevorton lies partially in the northeastern corner of the township along the Susquehanna River and U.S. Route 15.

== Demographics ==
Historical population
Census	Pop.	Note	%±
2010	1,554		—
2020	1,565		0.7%
2022 (est.)	1,575		0.6%
U.S. Decennial Census

As of the census of 2000, there were 1,426 people, 433 households, and 354 families residing in the township. The population density was 107.1 inhabitants per square mile (41.4/km^{2}). There were 471 housing units at an average density of 35.4 per square mile (13.7/km^{2}). The racial makeup of the township was 99.72% White, 0.14% African American, 0.07% Asian, and 0.07% from two or more races. Hispanic or Latino of any race were 0.07% of the population.

There were 433 households, out of which 40.6% had children under the age of 18 living with them, 70.4% were married couples living together, 7.2% had a female householder with no husband present, and 18.2% were non-families. 16.9% of all households were made up of individuals, and 6.0% had someone living alone who was 65 years of age or older. The average household size was 3.29 and the average family size was 3.76.

In the township the population was spread out, with 34.8% under the age of 18, 9.1% from 18 to 24, 27.3% from 25 to 44, 18.8% from 45 to 64, and 10.0% who were 65 years of age or older. The median age was 30 years. For every 100 females, there were 104.6 males. For every 100 females age 18 and over, there were 97.0 males.

The median income for a household in the township was $31,250, and the median income for a family was $33,750. Males had a median income of $28,611 versus $19,211 for females. The per capita income for the township was $12,632. About 13.3% of families and 20.4% of the population were below the poverty line, including 33.6% of those under age 18 and 19.4% of those age 65 or over.
