= Port Trevorton, Pennsylvania =

Unincorporated community in Pennsylvania, US

Port Trevorton
- Census-designated place
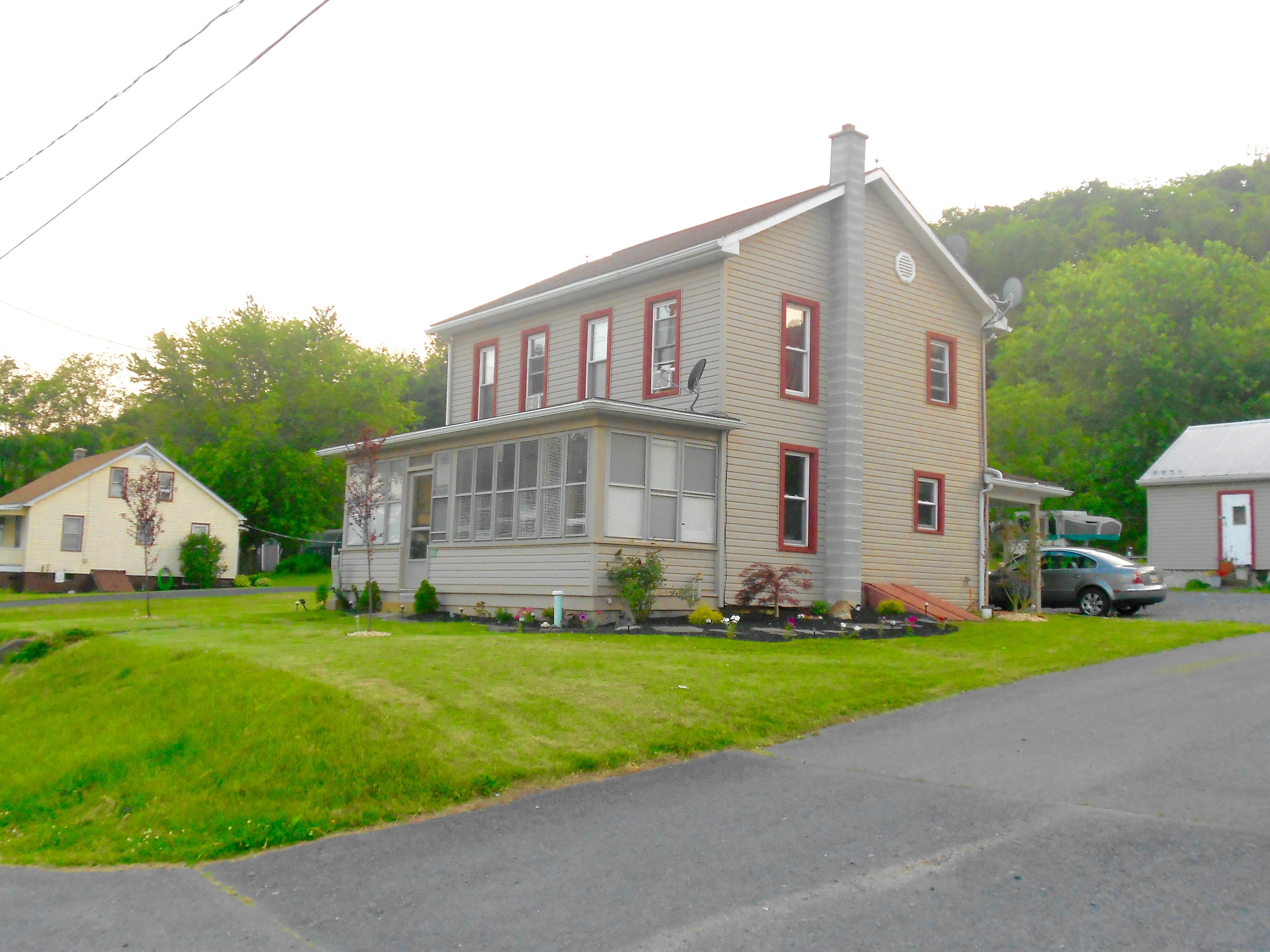
- House in Port Trevorton

- Location within the U.S. state of Pennsylvania Port Trevorton (the United States)
- Coordinates: 40°41′11″N 76°53′13″W
- Country: United States
- State: Pennsylvania
- County: Snyder

Area
  - Total: 3.39 sq mi (8.78 km^{2})
  - Land: 3.38 sq mi (8.76 km^{2})
  - Water: 0.0077 sq mi (0.02 km^{2})

Population (2020)
  - Total: 734
  - Density: 217.1/sq mi (83.83/km^{2})
- Time zone: UTC-5 (Eastern (EST))
  - Summer (DST): UTC-4 (EDT)
- ZIP code: 17864
- Area codes: 570 and 272
- FIPS code: 42-62312

Port Trevorton is a census-designated place (CDP) in Snyder County, Pennsylvania, United States. The population was 451 at the 2000 census.

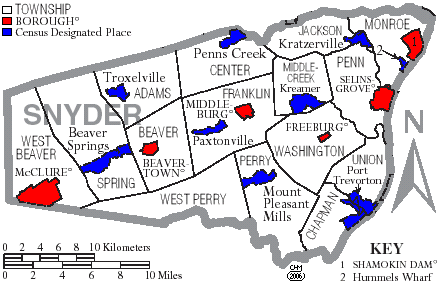
Map of Snyder County, Pennsylvania with Municipal Labels showing Boroughs (red), Townships (white), and Census-designated places (blue).

== Geography ==
Port Trevorton is located at 40°41′11″N 76°53′13″W (40.686397, -76.886956).

According to the United States Census Bureau, the CDP has a total area of 2.8 square miles (7.3 km^{2}), all land. It is located in Chapman and Union townships.

== Demographics ==
Historical population
Census	Pop.	Note	%±
2020	734		—
U.S. Decennial Census

As of the census of 2000, there were 451 people, 166 households, and 118 families residing in the CDP. The population density was 163.9 inhabitants per square mile (63.3/km^{2}). There were 183 housing units at an average density of 66.5 per square mile (25.7/km^{2}). The racial makeup of the CDP was 99.33% White, 0.22% African American, 0.22% Native American and 0.22% Asian. Hispanic or Latino of any race were 0.22% of the population.

There were 166 households, out of which 32.5% had children under the age of 18 living with them, 59.6% were married couples living together, 7.8% had a female householder with no husband present, and 28.9% were non-families. 25.9% of all households were made up of individuals, and 12.0% had someone living alone who was 65 years of age or older. The average household size was 2.72 and the average family size was 3.32.

In the CDP, the population was spread out, with 30.2% under the age of 18, 9.5% from 18 to 24, 27.1% from 25 to 44, 21.7% from 45 to 64, and 11.5% who were 65 years of age or older. The median age was 33 years. For every 100 females, there were 101.3 males. For every 100 females age 18 and over, there were 92.1 males.

The median income for a household in the CDP was $38,158, and the median income for a family was $40,625. Males had a median income of $31,458 versus $19,167 for females. The per capita income for the CDP was $12,363. About 6.5% of families and 9.3% of the population were below the poverty line, including 14.4% of those under age 18 and 14.3% of those age 65 or over.

== History ==
The name of the town comes from its days as a coal port on the Pennsylvania Canal. Coal from the mines of the Zerbe Valley, near Trevorton was shipped to the town via the Trevorton and Susquehanna Railroad, which was completed in 1855, crossing the Susquehanna River on a long bridge from Herndon to Port Trevorton. A canal basin was built for coal loading from the railcars. However, a new route was built to the coal mines via Shamokin, and the bridge was removed in 1870. As the fortunes of the canal declined, so too did those of the town.

== See also ==
- Trevorton Bridge
