= Union Township, Snyder County, Pennsylvania =

Township in Pennsylvania, United States

Coordinates: 40°43′00″N 76°52′59″W

- Township
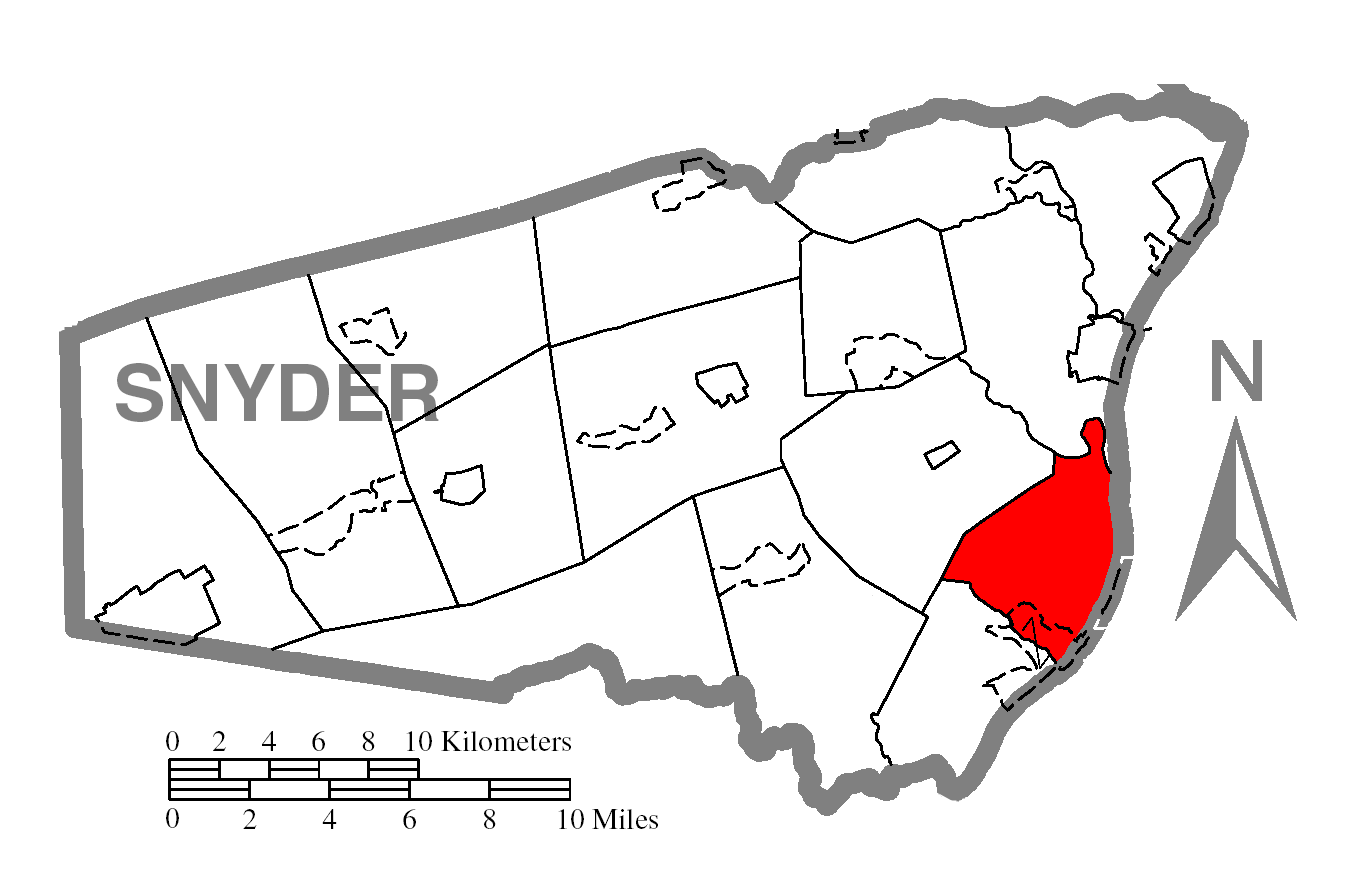
- Map of Snyder County, Pennsylvania highlighting Union Township

- Map of Snyder County, Pennsylvania
- Country: United States
- State: Pennsylvania
- County: Snyder
- Settled: 1766
- Incorporated: 1869

Area
  - Total: 14.59 sq mi (37.79 km^{2})
  - Land: 14.48 sq mi (37.51 km^{2})
  - Water: 0.11 sq mi (0.28 km^{2})

Population (2020)
  - Total: 1,493 ▼
  - Estimate (2022): 1,500
  - Density: 105.8/sq mi (40.84/km^{2})
- Time zone: UTC-5 (Eastern (EST))
  - Summer (DST): UTC-4 (EDT)
- Area code: 570
- FIPS code: 42-109-78408

Union Township is a township in Snyder County, Pennsylvania, United States. The population was 1,493 at the 2020 census.

== Geography ==
According to the United States Census Bureau, the township has a total area of 14.6 square miles (37.9 km^{2}), of which 14.6 square miles (37.7 km^{2}) is land and 0.1 square mile (0.2 km^{2}) of (0.61%) is water.

Union Township is bordered by Penn Township to the north. The Susquehanna River forms the eastern border of the township with Northumberland County. Union Township is bordered by Chapman Township to the south and Washington Township to the west.

The census-designated place of Port Trevorton lies partially in the southern reaches of Union Township along the Susquehanna River and U.S. Route.

== Demographics ==
Historical population
Census	Pop.	Note	%±
2010	1,520		—
2020	1,493		−1.8%
2022 (est.)	1,500		0.5%
U.S. Decennial Census

As of the census of 2000, there were 1,519 people, 506 households, and 389 families residing in the township. The population density was 104.3 inhabitants per square mile (40.3/km^{2}). There were 530 housing units at an average density of 36.4 per square mile (14.1/km^{2}). The racial makeup of the township was 99.08% White, 0.07% Native American, 0.07% Asian, 0.07% Pacific Islander, 0.53% from other races, and 0.20% from two or more races. Hispanic or Latino of any race were 1.05% of the population.

There were 506 households, out of which 35.4% had children under the age of 18 living with them, 67.2% were married couples living together, 5.5% had a female householder with no husband present, and 23.1% were non-families. 19.0% of all households were made up of individuals, and 10.3% had someone living alone who was 65 years of age or older. The average household size was 3.00 and the average family size was 3.46.

In the township the population was spread out, with 31.5% under the age of 18, 8.4% from 18 to 24, 26.9% from 25 to 44, 21.3% from 45 to 64, and 11.9% who were 65 years of age or older. The median age was 34 years. For every 100 females there were 102.0 males. For every 100 females age 18 and over, there were 96.8 males.

The median income for a household in the township was $38,958, and the median income for a family was $41,830. Males had a median income of $29,050 versus $19,881 for females. The per capita income for the township was $14,115. About 8.9% of families and 9.9% of the population were below the poverty line, including 12.1% of those under age 18 and 14.5% of those age 65 or over.
