= Pennsylvania Route 225 =

State highway in Dauphin and Northumberland counties in Pennsylvania, US

Pennsylvania Route 225

Route information
- Maintained by PennDOT
- Length: 48.579 mi (78.180 km)

Major junctions
- South end: US 22 / US 322 in Dauphin
- PA 325 near Dauphin; PA 147 in Halifax; US 209 in Elizabethville; PA 25 in Berrysburg; PA 147 in Jackson Township; PA 890 in Trevorton
- North end: PA 61 in Shamokin

Location
- Country: United States
- State: Pennsylvania
- Counties: Dauphin, Northumberland

Highway system
- Pennsylvania State Route System; Interstate; US; State; Scenic; Legislative
← PA 224	→ PA 226

Pennsylvania Route 225 (PA 225) is a 48.5-mile-long (78.1 km) state highway located in Dauphin and Northumberland Counties in Pennsylvania. The southern terminus is at an interchange with U.S. Route 22 (US 22)/US 322 in Dauphin. The northern terminus is at PA 61 in Shamokin. PA 225 is mostly a two-lane undivided road running through mountain and valley areas in the central part of the state. The route serves the communities of Halifax, Elizabethville, Berrysburg, Pillow, and Trevorton. PA 225 intersects PA 325 north of Dauphin, PA 147 in Halifax, US 209 in Elizabethville, PA 25 in Berrysburg, and PA 890 in Trevorton.

PA 225 was designated in 1928 to run from PA 25 in Berrysburg north to Shamokin, where it turned south and ended in Line Mountain. The route replaced a section of PA 45 between south of Herndon and Shamokin that had been designated a year earlier. The northern terminus of the route was truncated to US 122 (now PA 61) in Shamokin in the 1930s, with PA 125 replacing the section between Shamokin and Line Mountain. Also, the route was extended south to US 11/US 15/US 22/US 322 at Allegheny Street in Dauphin. The southern terminus was constructed into an interchange in 1942. The south end of PA 225 was realigned to end at an interchange with the US 22/US 322 freeway bypass of Dauphin in 1999, with the new alignment of PA 225 bypassing the borough to the west.

== Route description ==
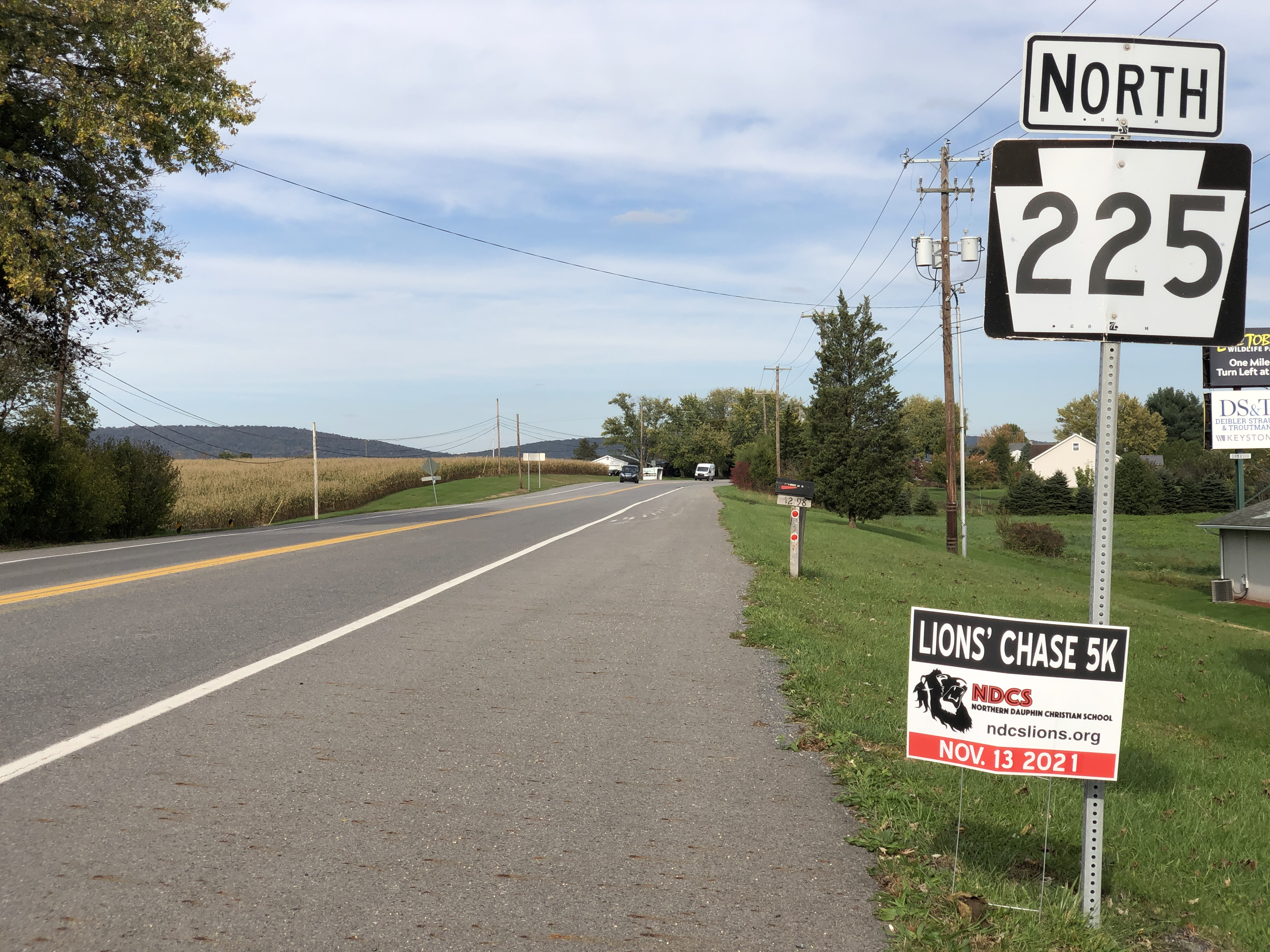
PA 225 northbound in Halifax Township

PA 225 begins at an interchange with the US 22/US 322 freeway in Middle Paxton Township, Dauphin County, heading east on Peters Mountain Road, a four-lane divided highway. The route soon becomes a two-lane undivided road and runs through wooded areas with some residences. The road briefly enters the borough of Dauphin, where it turns north back into Middle Paxton Township and heads through rural areas of homes. PA 225 turns to the northwest and intersects PA 325, at which point that route comes from the east to turn north and form a concurrency with PA 225. The road passes through woods before heading into agricultural areas, with PA 325 splitting to the west. Past this, the route turns northeast to ascend forested Peters Mountain. At the summit, the road heads into Halifax Township and passes under a bridge carrying the Appalachian Trail, making a hairpin turn to the west to descend the mountain. PA 225 makes another hairpin turn to the northeast before turning north and coming into a valley containing agricultural areas with a few homes. The route runs north-northeast before passing through the residential communities of Powells Valley and Matamoras, heading more to the north at this point. PA 225 turns northeast again and intersects PA 147, at which point that route turns northeast to join PA 225. The road gains a center left-turn lane and heads north through rural areas of homes and businesses, passing east of Halifax Area High School. The two routes continue into the borough of Halifax and become South 4th Street, losing the center left-turn lane and passing several homes. PA 147 splits from PA 225 by heading west on Market Street, and PA 225 continues north on North 4th Street. The route turns east onto Armstrong Street, passing more residences and some businesses.

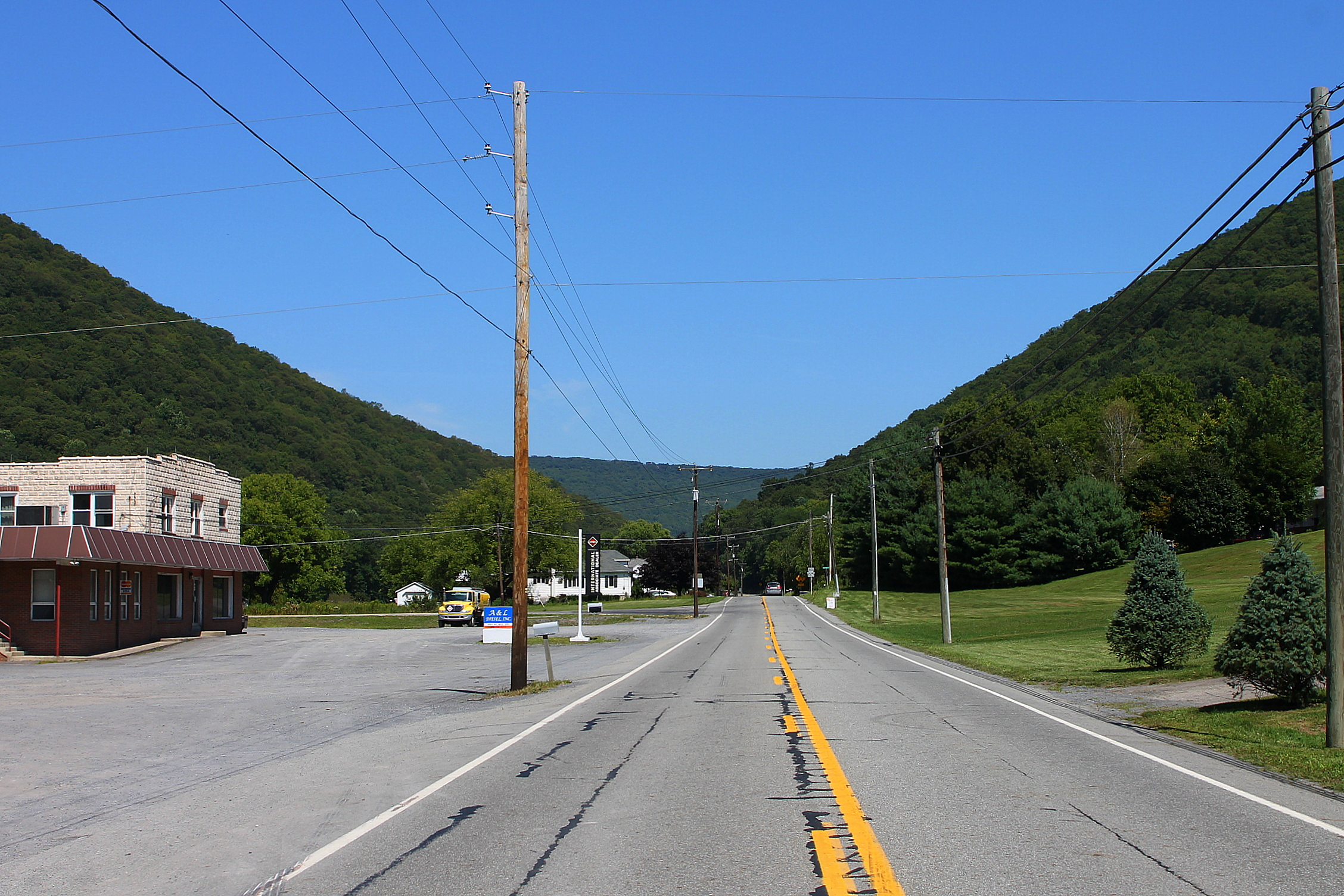
PA 225 at the Dornsife Gap

The road turns to the northeast and heads back into Halifax Township, becoming Armstrong Valley Road and running through open agricultural areas with some homes. PA 225 enters Jackson Township and runs through Fisherville, turning more to the east before heading northeast again. The road turns north to cross forested Berry Mountain, passing a quarry as it crosses into Washington Township and becomes an unnamed road. The route curves northeast to descend the mountain into the Lykens Valley, a rural valley that is home to an Amish community, and heads into the borough of Elizabethville, becoming South Market Street and turning north into residential areas. PA 225 heads into the commercial center of town and intersects US 209, becoming North Market Street at this point and passing more homes along with a few businesses. The route crosses back into Washington Township and runs through agricultural areas with some woods and homes, crossing the Wiconisco Creek. The road runs through more open farmland as it continues into Mifflin Township and becomes South Main Street. PA 225 enters the borough of Berrysburg and passes homes, crossing PA 25 and becoming North Main Street. The route heads back into Mifflin Township and becomes an unnamed road, running through more farm fields with some homes and curving to the northeast. The road turns to the north and passes through a forested gap in Mahantango Mountain, leaving the Lykens Valley. After this, PA 225 heads into the borough of Pillow and becomes South Chestnut Street, passing homes. The route turns west onto Market Street and runs through more residential areas before heading into rural surroundings.

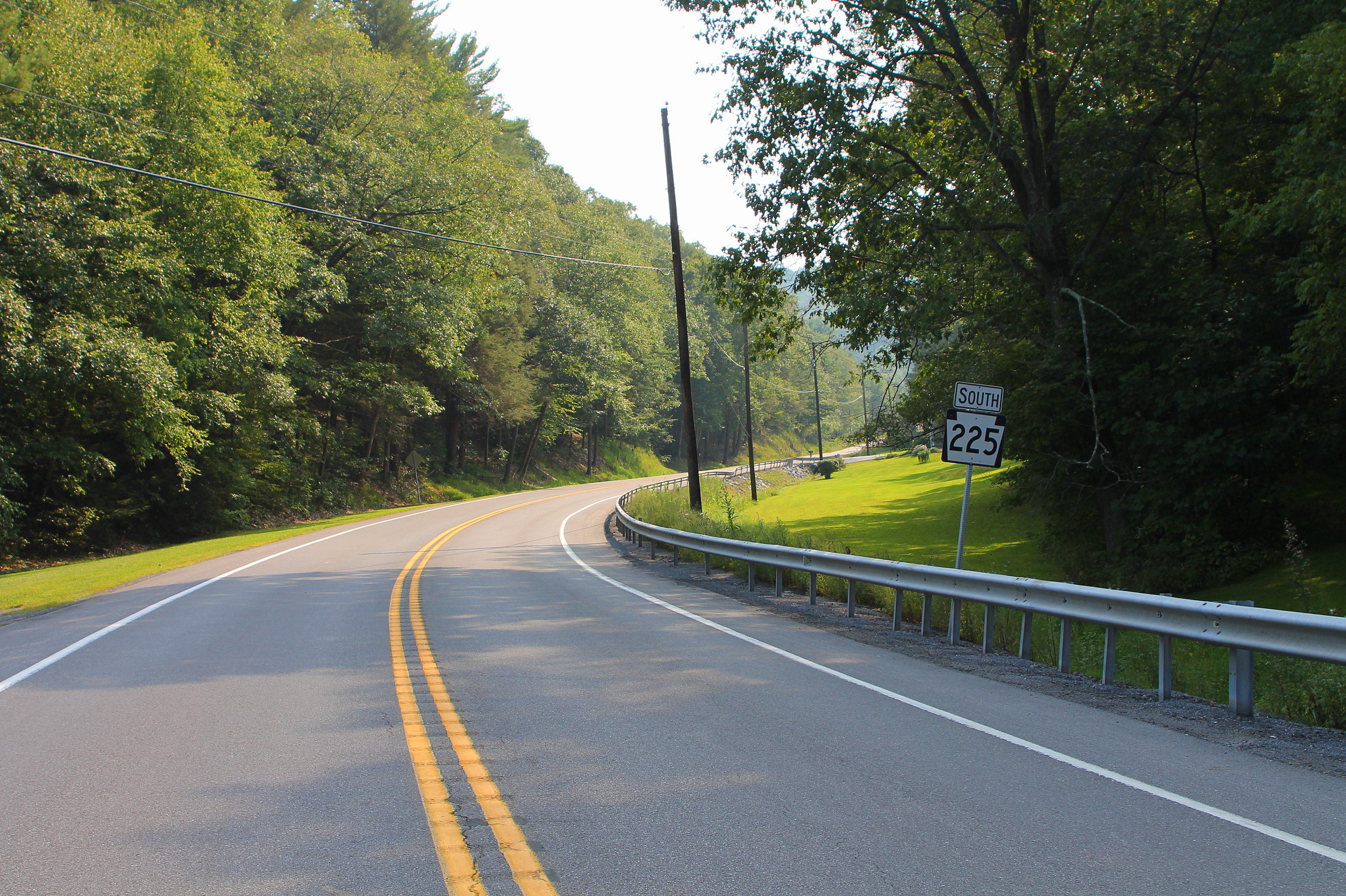
PA 225 south in Jackson Township, Northumberland County

PA 225 crosses the Mahantango Creek into Lower Mahanoy Township in Northumberland County, becoming an unnamed road and curving north into a mix of farmland and woodland. The road turns to the northwest and passes through a gap in forested Fisher Ridge prior to running through more areas of farms and woods with some homes, heading west of Line Mountain Jr./Sr. High School and passing between two quarries. The route runs through Mandata and runs through forested areas as it passes through a gap in Hooflander Mountain, crossing into Jackson Township. After the gap, PA 225 comes to an intersection with a connector road to PA 147 a short distance to the west, with the route turning east into agricultural areas with some homes a short distance to the north of Hooflander Mountain. The road curves north into wooded areas with some fields, passing near Red Cross. The route runs to the east of the Mahanoy Creek as it heads through more rural areas, coming into the forested gap of Line Mountain and crossing into Little Mahanoy Township. PA 225 crosses the creek and passes through Dornsife, curving to the east before turning northeast into farmland with some woods and homes. The road passes through Raker as it heads east and northeast again and running near Dunkelbergers. The surroundings become more forested as the route runs east between Little Mountain to the north and Big Mountain to the south, continuing into Zerbe Township. PA 225 continues into the community of Trevorton and becomes West Shamokin Street, passing homes along with a few businesses. The road intersects the southern terminus of PA 890 before becoming East Shamokin Street farther east. The route leaves Trevorton and runs through forested areas of residences between the two mountains. PA 225 continues into Coal Township and becomes Corporal David Whitmer Highway, running through the residential community of Klingers. The road continues through more wooded areas with some development, curving to the south through a gap in forested Big Mountain. PA 225 turns east for a short distance to come to its northern terminus at PA 61.

== History ==
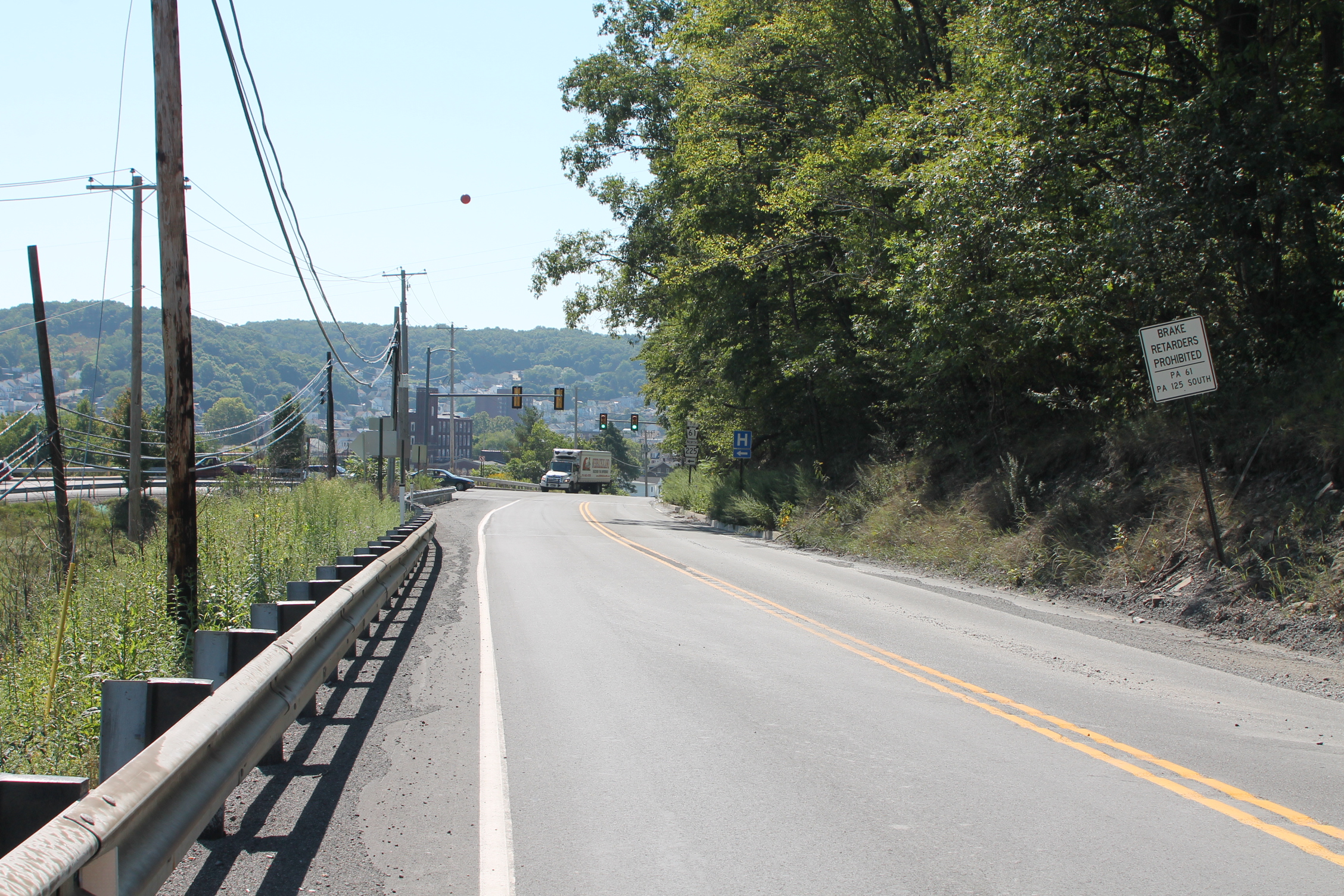
PA 225 looking south towards its northern terminus at PA 61 in Shamokin

When Pennsylvania first legislated routes in 1911, the present alignment of PA 225 was not given a number. In 1927, the section of road between a connector to PA 14 (now PA 147) south of Herndon and Shamokin was designated as part of PA 45, which continued east to Easton. PA 225 was designated in 1928 to run from PA 25 in Berrysburg northeast to Line Mountain, following its current alignment to Shamokin before it turned south to Line Mountain; the route replaced the PA 45 designation between south of Herndon and Shamokin. At this time, the road was paved between Berrysburg and Pillow and between Mandata and Shamokin, with the section between Pillow and Mandata under construction. By 1930, PA 225 was paved between Pillow and Mandata and for a short distance to the south of Shamokin. At this time, the road between Dauphin and Berrysburg was unnumbered, with paved sections to the north of Dauphin, to the south of Powls Valley, between Halifax and Fisherville, and between Elizabethville and Berrysburg; a section southwest of Elizabethville was under construction. In the 1930s, the northern terminus was cut back to US 122 (now PA 61) in Shamokin, with the former alignment between Shamokin and Line Mountain becoming part of PA 125, while the route was extended south from Berrysburg to US 11/US 15/US 22/US 322 (Allegheny Street) in Dauphin, following its current alignment south to Dauphin before heading through the borough on Claster Boulevard and Lower Erie Street. At this time, the entire length of the route was paved. The intersection with US 22/US 322/PA 14 in Dauphin was reconstructed into an interchange in 1942. In 1999, PA 225 was realigned to bypass Dauphin to the west and end at an interchange with the newly constructed US 22/US 322 freeway bypass of Dauphin.

== Major intersections ==
County	Location	mi	km	Destinations	Notes
Dauphin	Middle Paxton Township	0.000	0.000	US 22 / US 322 – Harrisburg, Lewistown	Interchange; southern terminus
Dauphin	Middle Paxton Township	1.694	2.726	PA 325 east (Clarks Valley Road) – Dehart Dam, Tower City	South end of PA 325 concurrency
Dauphin	Middle Paxton Township	2.424	3.901	PA 325 west (Mountain Road)	North end of PA 325 concurrency
Dauphin	Halifax Township	7.617	12.258	PA 147 south (South River Road) – Harrisburg	South end of PA 147 concurrency
Dauphin	Halifax	9.041	14.550	PA 147 north (Market Street) – Millersburg	North end of PA 147 concurrency
Dauphin	Elizabethville	18.178	29.255	US 209 (Main Street) – Millersburg, Lykens	
Dauphin	Berrysburg	22.005	35.414	PA 25 (Market Street) – Millersburg, Gratz	
Northumberland	Jackson Township	29.432	47.366	SR 3012 to PA 147 – Herndon	
Northumberland	Zerbe Township	42.339	68.138	PA 890 north (5th Street) – Sunbury	Southern terminus of PA 890
Northumberland	Coal Township	48.579	78.180	PA 61 – Sunbury, Shamokin, Mount Carmel	Northern terminus
1.000 mi = 1.609 km; 1.000 km = 0.621 mi: Concurrency terminus
