= Pennsylvania Route 890 =

State highway in Northumberland County, Pennsylvania, US

Pennsylvania Route 890

Route information
- Maintained by PennDOT
- Length: 9.003 mi (14.489 km)
- Existed: 1928–present

Major junctions
- South end: PA 225 in Zerbe Township
- North end: PA 61 in Upper Augusta Township

Location
- Country: United States
- State: Pennsylvania
- Counties: Northumberland

Highway system
- Pennsylvania State Route System; Interstate; US; State; Scenic; Legislative
← PA 889	→ PA 891

Pennsylvania Route 890 (PA 890) is an 9.00-mile-long (14.48 km) state highway located in Northumberland County, Pennsylvania. The southern terminus is at PA 225 in Zerbe Township. The northern terminus is at PA 61 in Upper Augusta Township. The route runs through rural areas as a two-lane road, passing through the community of Augustaville. PA 890 was designated in 1928 between Augustaville and U.S. Route 120 (US 120, now PA 61) near Sunbury. The route was extended to PA 225 in Trevorton in 1941.

== Route description ==
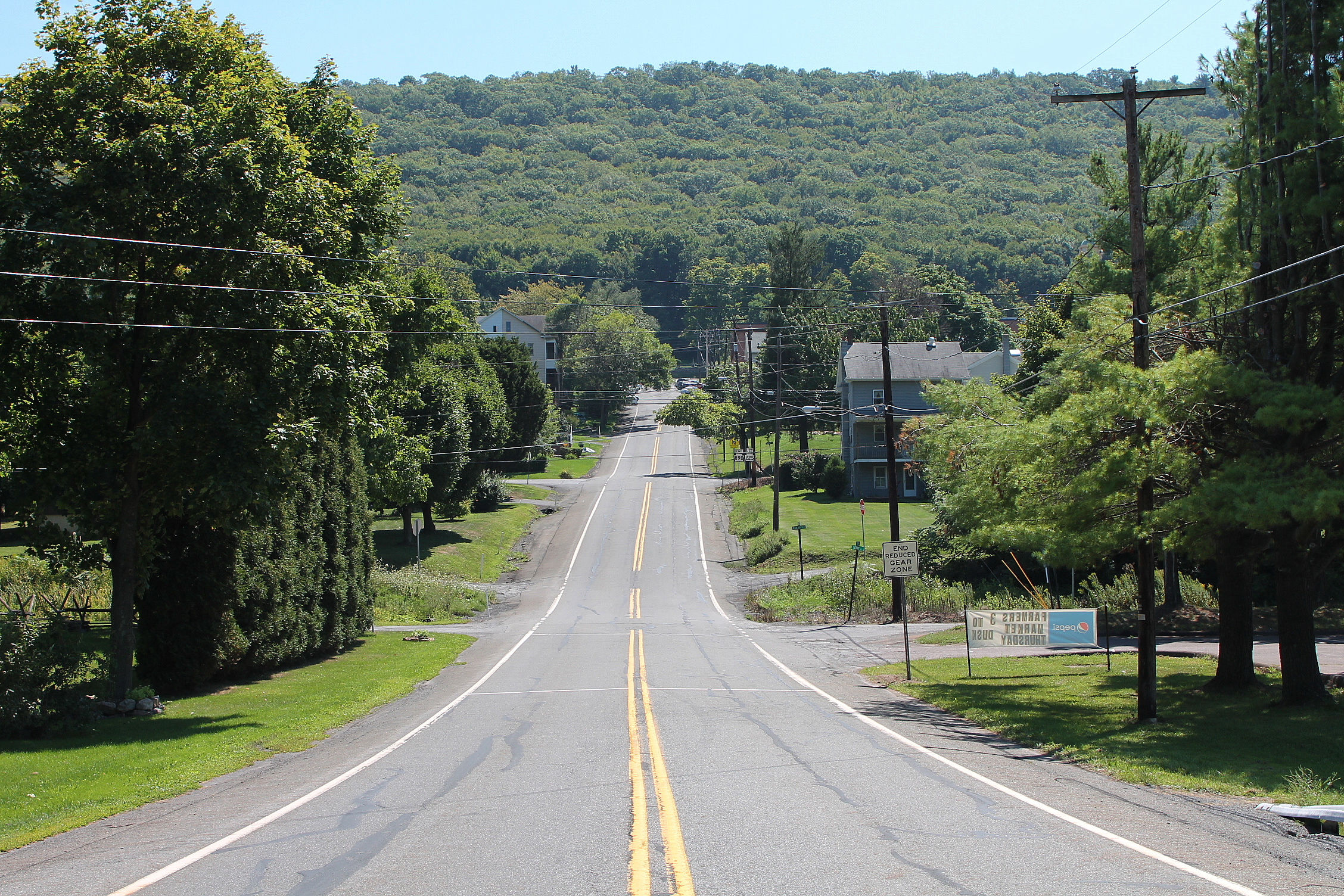
PA 890 near its southern terminus in Trevorton

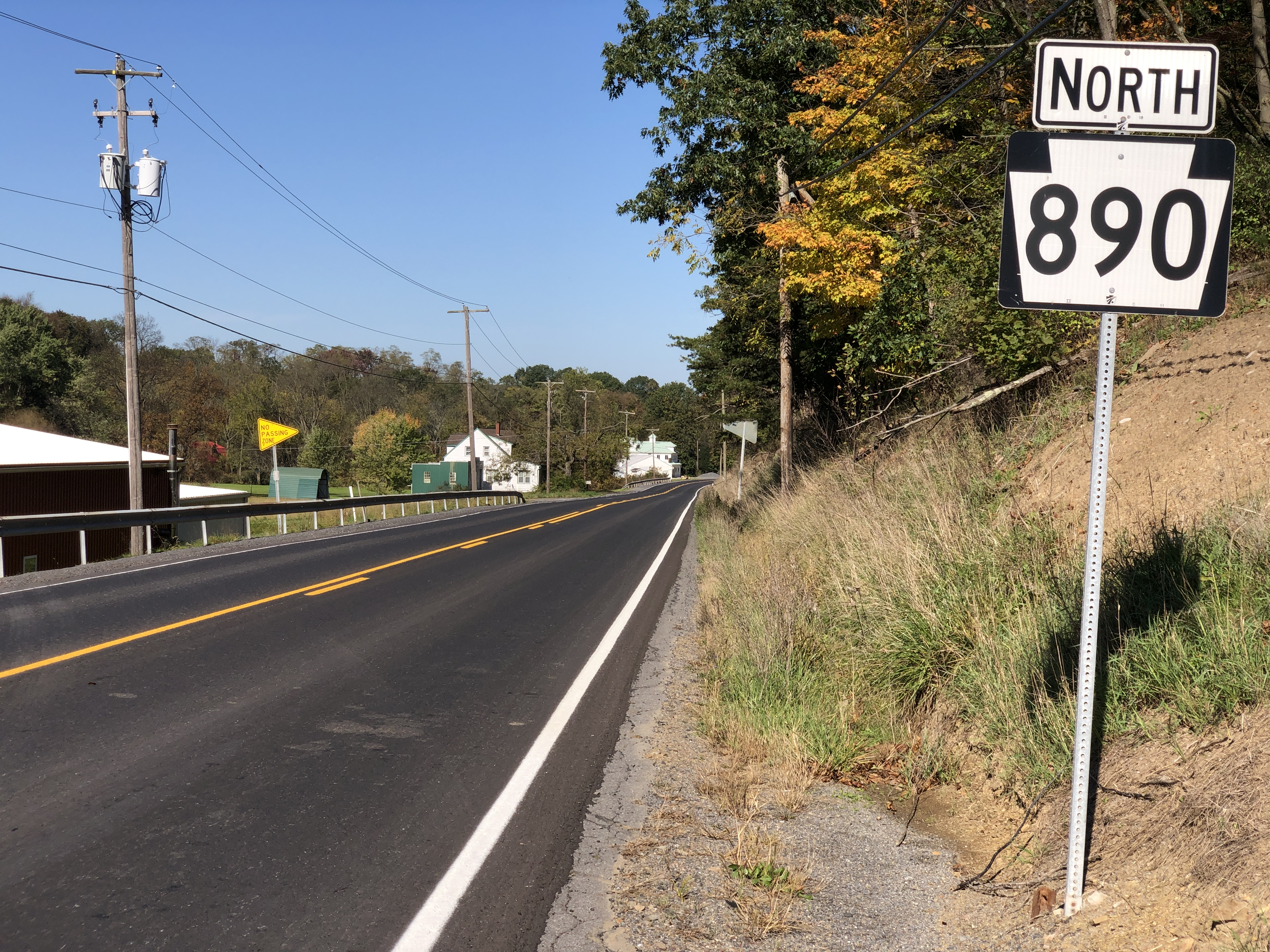
PA 890 northbound in Rockefeller Township

PA 890 begins at an intersection with PA 225 in the community of Trevorton in Zerbe Township, running north on two-lane undivided North 5th Street past homes. Leaving Trevorton, the route becomes an unnamed road and heads west across forested Little Mountain. While crossing the mountain, the road briefly enters Shamokin Township before heading into Rockefeller Township. After crossing the mountain, PA 890 enters a mix of farmland and woodland with a few scattered residences, turning to the north. The road passes through Augustaville and continues through more agricultural surroundings with scattered woods and homes. PA 890 heads northwest through more rural areas before entering Upper Augusta Township and reaching its northern terminus at PA 61 in the residential community of Hamilton.

== History ==
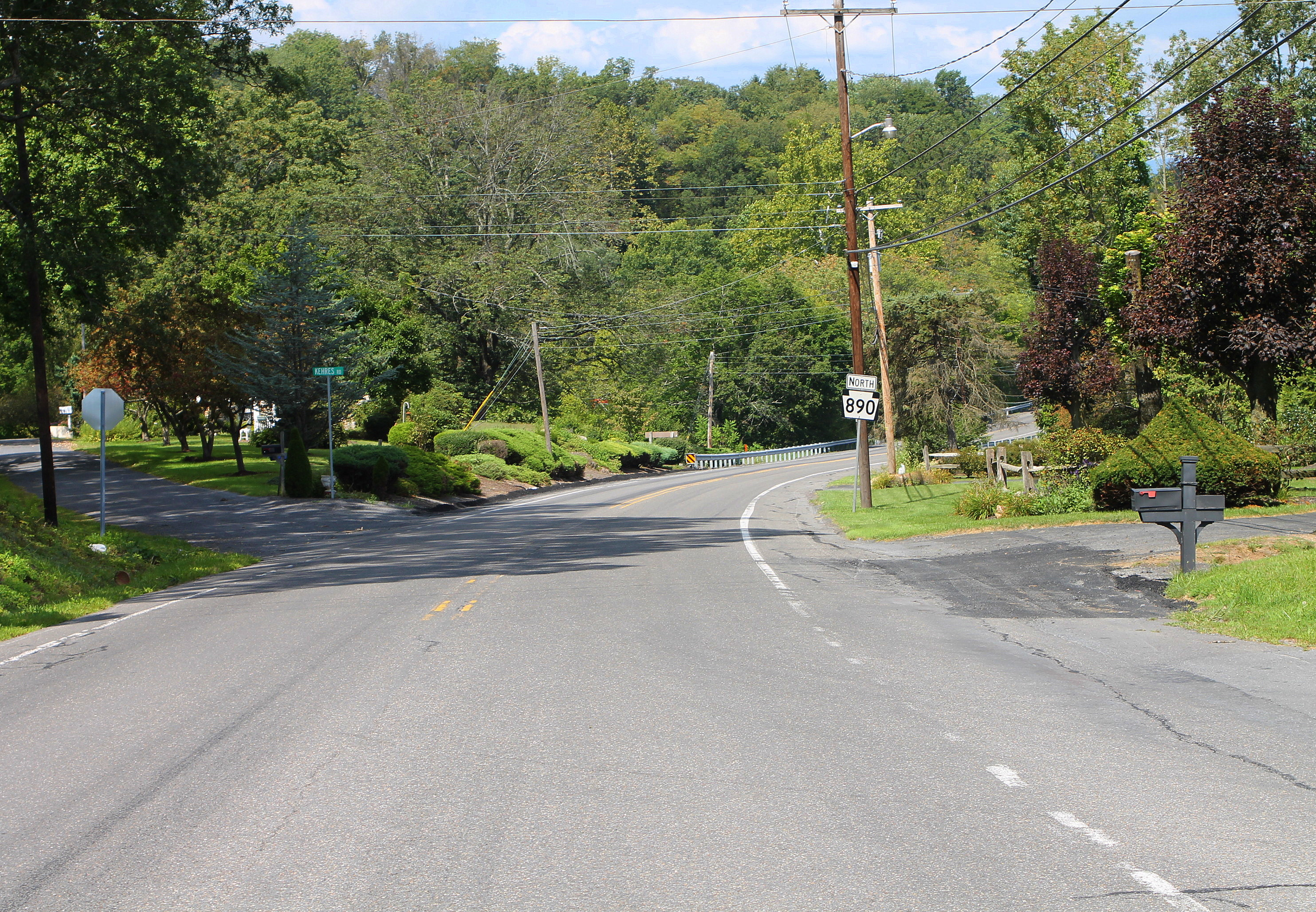
PA 890 north near its northern terminus

When Pennsylvania first legislated routes in 1911, what is now PA 890 was not given a number. PA 890 was designated in 1928 to run from Augustaville north to US 120 (now PA 61) east of Sunbury along an unpaved road. By 1930, a small portion of the route south of the US 120 intersection was paved. The entire length of the road was paved in the 1930s. On March 1, 1941, PA 890 was extended south from Augustaville to PA 225 in Trevorton.

== Major intersections ==
The entire route is in Northumberland County.

Location	mi	km	Destinations	Notes
Zerbe Township	0.000	0.000	PA 225 (Shamokin Street) – Shamokin, Mandata	Southern terminus
Upper Augusta Township	9.003	14.489	PA 61 (State Street) – Sunbury, Shamokin	Northern terminus
1.000 mi = 1.609 km; 1.000 km = 0.621 mi
