= Jordan Township, Northumberland County, Pennsylvania =

Township in Pennsylvania, US

Coordinates: 40°40′00″N 76°45′59″W

- Township
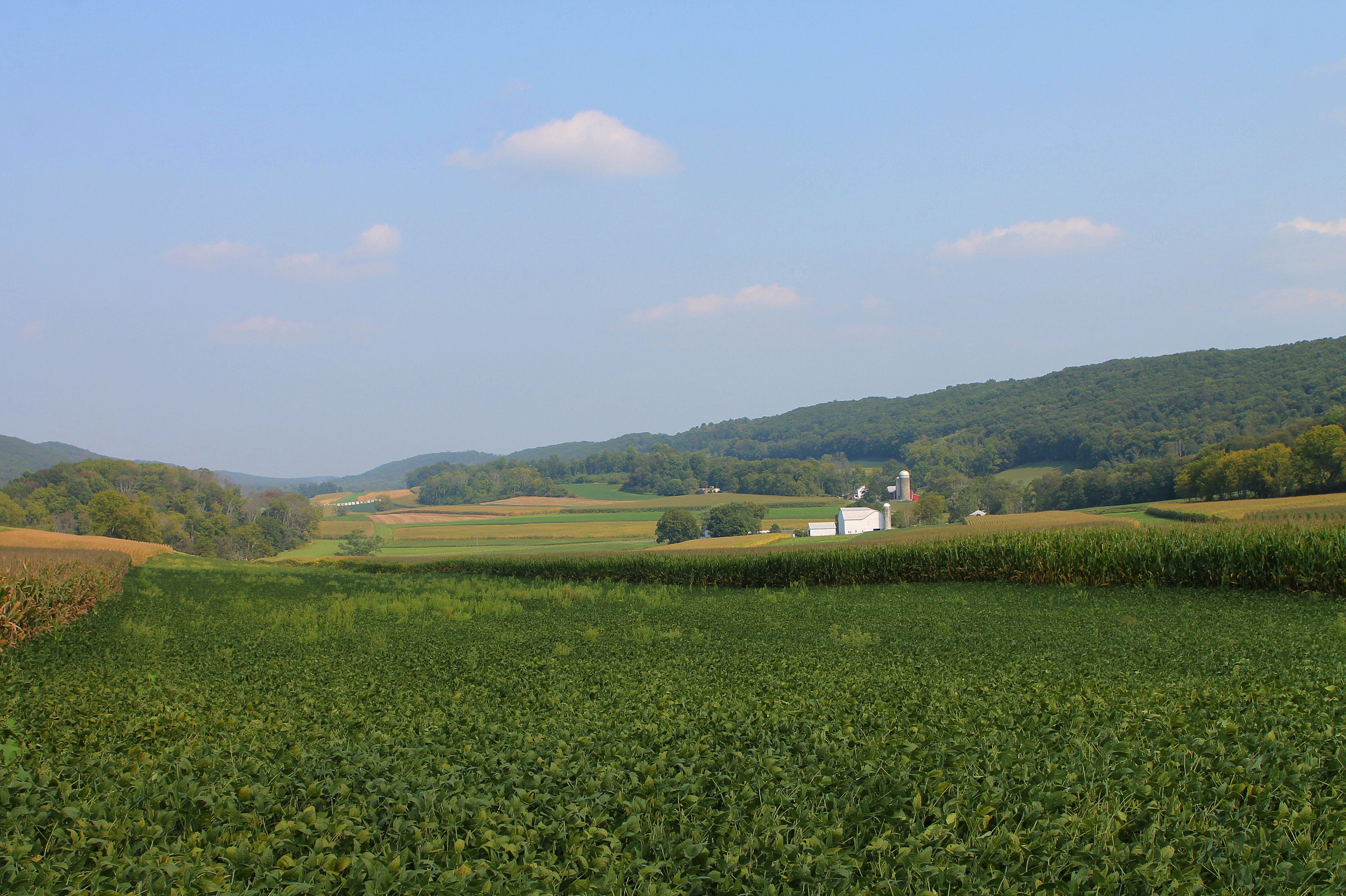
- Scenery of Jordan Township

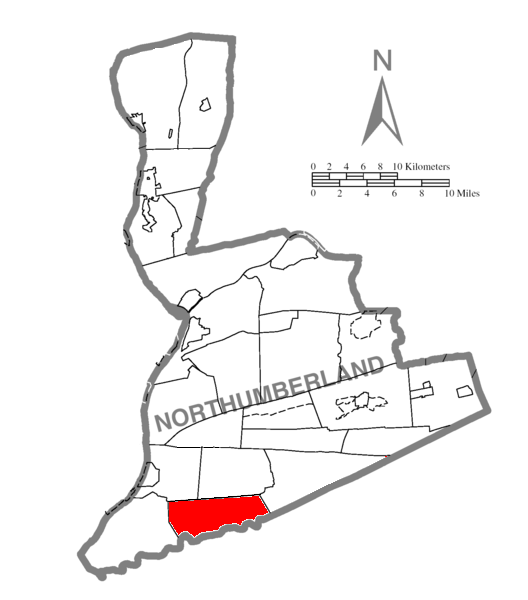
- Map of Northumberland County, Pennsylvania highlighting Jordan Township

- Map of Northumberland County, Pennsylvania
- Country: United States
- State: Pennsylvania
- County: Northumberland
- Settled: 1778
- Incorporated: 1852

Government
  - Type: Board of Supervisors

Area
  - Total: 17.26 sq mi (44.71 km^{2})
  - Land: 17.19 sq mi (44.53 km^{2})
  - Water: 0.069 sq mi (0.18 km^{2})

Population (2010)
  - Total: 794
  - Estimate (2016): 775
  - Density: 45/sq mi (17.4/km^{2})
- Time zone: UTC-5 (Eastern (EST))
  - Summer (DST): UTC-4 (EDT)
- Area code: 570
- FIPS code: 42-097-38456

Jordan Township is a township that is located in Northumberland County, Pennsylvania, United States. The population at the time of the 2010 Census was 794, an increase over the figure of 761 that was tabulated in 2000.

== History ==
Previously part of Jackson and Upper Mahanoy townships in Northumberland County, Pennsylvania, Jordan Township was formed during the mid-nineteenth century and named in honor of Judge Alexander Jordan, who was the first publicly elected president judge of the county. In 1852, "a petition was created for its erection at January sessions ... and referred to George C. Welker, John Young, and William M. Rockefeller; the report was confirmed nisi, April 5, 1852, and absolutely, August 4, 1852.

The first township officers were:

- Assessor: Daniel Williamson
- Auditors: George Schadel, Elias Schwartz, John Wiest
- Clerk: David Witmer
- Constable: D. Bohner
- Justices of the Peace: Benjamin Markel, Peter Schwartz
- Overseers of the Poor: John Bohner, John Daniel
- Supervisors: Davis Dornmeyer, John Krissinger
- Treasurer: George Trautman

The township's first public school system was established in 1865, which operated a total of seven schools by 1891, most of which were frame structures that had been erected between 1865 and 1866.

Also by 1891, a portion of the village of Mandata had been absorbed into the township with other sections of that community split between Jackson and Lower Mahanoy townships. Jordan Township's post office was located in the town of Jordan; its postmaster at that time, Noah Klock, had held the position since that post office was established.

That year, the major businesses in the township were the Wirt mill in Jordan, which had been erected a century earlier, and a tannery owned by J. W. Seal in the village of Jackson, which was also home to the former Bull Run Tavern that had been converted into a hotel. Jackson also was the site of roughly twelve private residences. Other communities at the time included Hebe, which functioned as a mail distribution hub and was located in the northeastern section of the township, and Urban, which was located in the northern part of the township and was home to an old hotel on Tulpehocken Road that had been built during the early 1800s and was owned, in 1891, by David Schwartz.

=== Churches ===
The first churches in Jordan Township were:

- Trautman's Church of the Evangelical Association: Organized by the Rev. John Seibert in 1826, Sunday services were conducted at private family homes throughout the township until 1877 when a permanent, frame structure was erected and formerly dedicated in February of that year.
- David's Church, Lutheran and Reformed: Erected in 1829, this was the oldest existing church in the township by 1891, and was a weather-boarded, log-frame structure. Its cornerstone laying and building dedication were both performed in 1829. Destroyed by fire in 1864, it was replaced by a new stone building that measured thirty by forty-five feet and had a marble slab above its door that was engraved with its 1864 dedication date.
- St. Paul's Church, Lutheran and Reformed: Erected in 1855, this thirty-by-forty-foot wooden structure had a seating capacity of three hundred. It was replaced by a thirty-five-by-sixty-five-foot wooden structure in 1890, with its cornerstone laid on May 18 of that year.

== Geography ==
According to the United States Census Bureau, the township has a total area of 17.3 square miles (45 km^{2}), all land.

== Demographics ==
Historical population
Census	Pop.	Note	%±
2010	794		—
2016 (est.)	775		−2.4%
U.S. Decennial Census

As of the census of 2000, there were 761 people, 296 households, and 238 families residing in the township.

The population density was 44.0 inhabitants per square mile (17.0/km^{2}). There were 317 housing units at an average density of 18.3/sq mi (7.1/km^{2}).

The racial makeup of the township was 99.87% White, 0.13% from other races. Hispanic or Latino of any race were 0.53% of the population.

There were 296 households, out of which 28.0% had children under the age of eighteen living with them; 75.3% were married couples living together, 3.0% had a female householder with no husband present, and 19.3% were non-families. 15.5% of all households were made up of individuals, and 6.1% had someone living alone who was sixty-five years of age or older.

The average household size was 2.57 and the average family size was 2.86.

Within the township, the population was spread out, with 19.2% who were under the age of eighteen, 9.5% who were aged eighteen to twenty-four, 26.8% who were aged twenty-five to forty-four, 29.2% who were aged forty-five to sixty-four, and 15.4% who were sixty-five years of age or older. The median age was forty-three years.

For every one hundred females, there were 97.7 males. For every one hundred females who were aged eighteen or older, there were 97.7 males.

The median income for a household in the township was $42,500, and the median income for a family was $45,625. Males had a median income of $29,375 compared with that of $21,023 for females.

The per capita income for the township was $16,839.

Approximately 2.9% of families and 4.7% of the population were living below the poverty line, including 6.6% of those who were under the age of eighteen and 5.3% of those who were aged sixty-five or older.

== Gallery ==
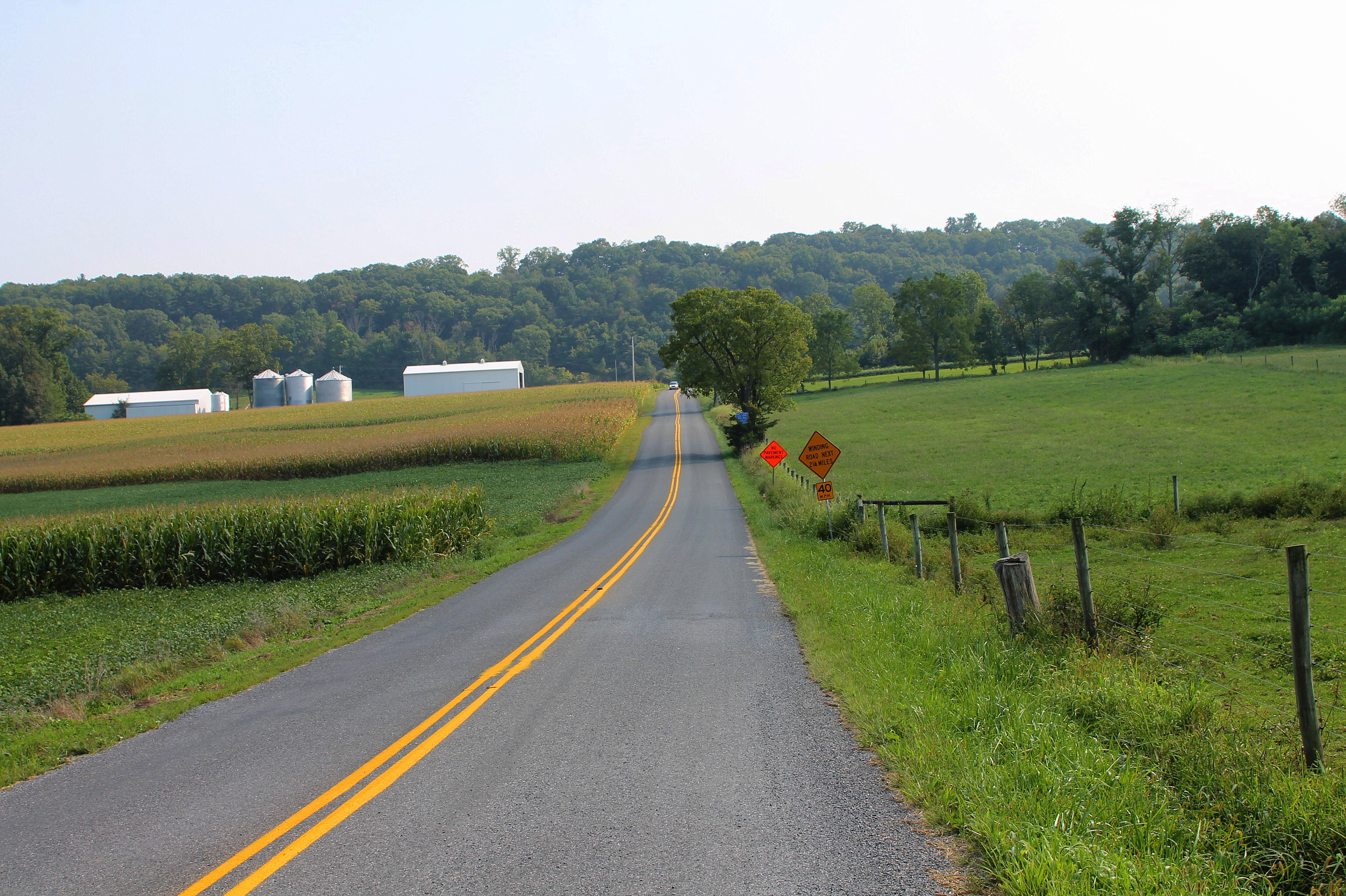
Quadrant Route 3013 (Jordan Township Road)

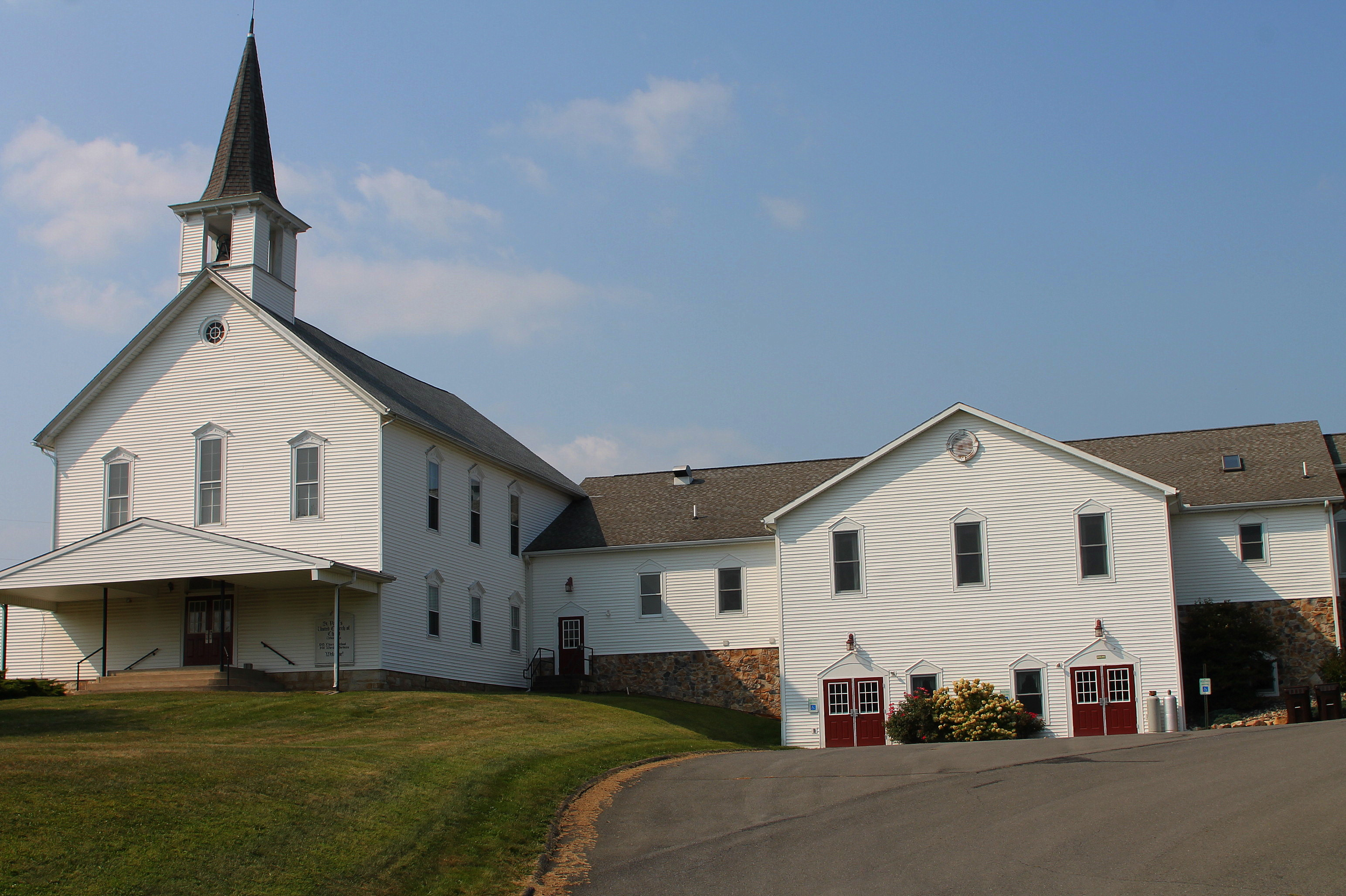
St. Paul's United Church of Christ, Jordan Township
