= Berrysburg, Pennsylvania =

Borough in Pennsylvania, US

- Borough
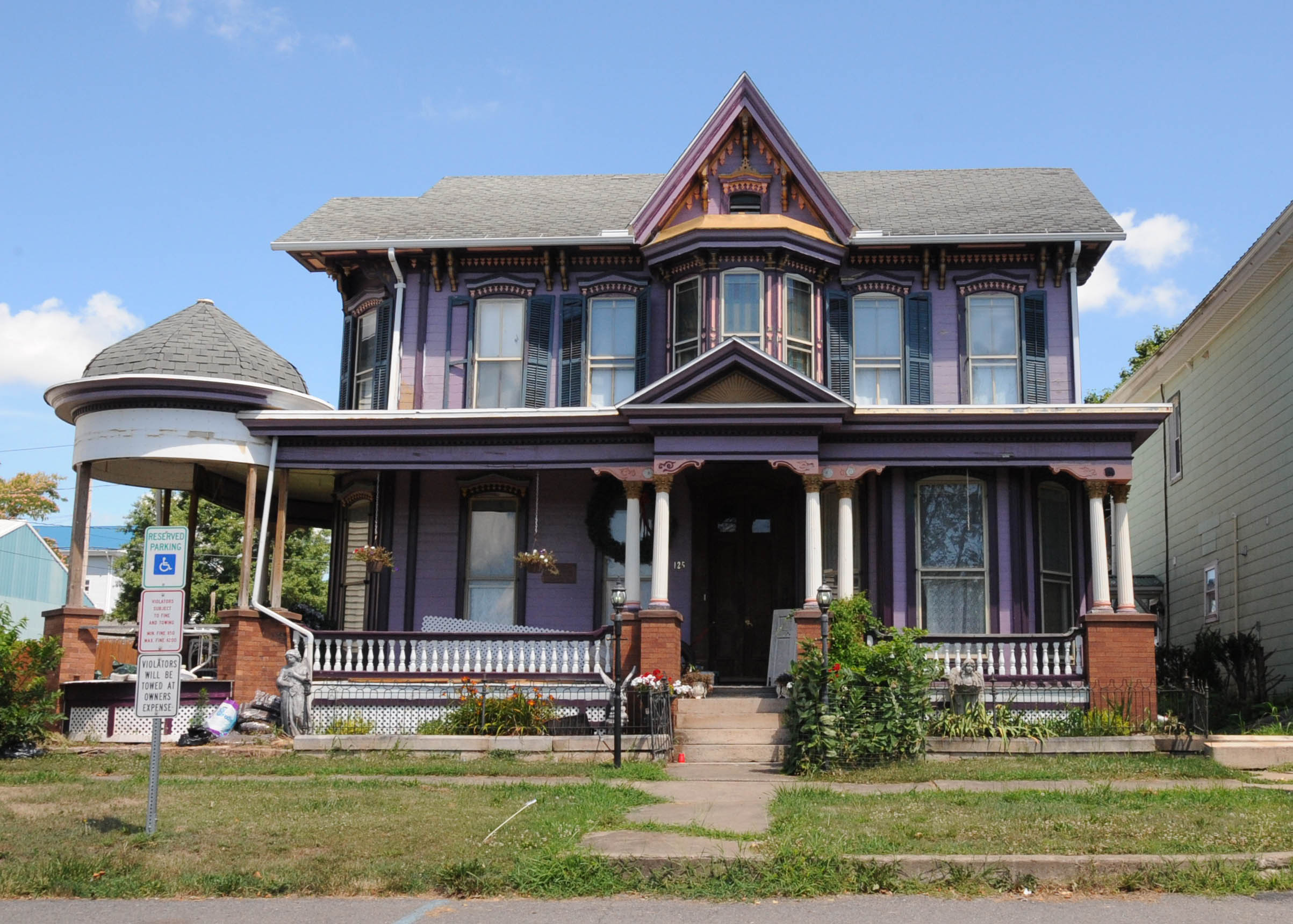
- Romberger-Stover House

- Location in Dauphin County and the U.S. state of Pennsylvania.

- Location in Pennsylvania and the United States Berrysburg (the United States)
- Coordinates: 40°36′09″N 76°48′41″W
- Country: United States
- State: Pennsylvania
- County: Dauphin
- Settled: 1819
- Incorporated: 1871

Government
  - Type: Borough Council

Area
  - Total: 0.61 sq mi (1.57 km^{2})
  - Land: 0.61 sq mi (1.57 km^{2})
  - Water: 0 sq mi (0.00 km^{2})
- Elevation: 722 ft (220 m)

Population (2020)
  - Total: 326
  - Density: 537.8/sq mi (207.64/km^{2})
- Time zone: UTC-5 (Eastern (EST))
  - Summer (DST): UTC-4 (EDT)
- ZIP Code: 17005
- Area code: 717
- FIPS code: 42-05856
- Website: berrysburg.org

Berrysburg is a borough in Dauphin County, Pennsylvania, United States. The population was 324 at the 2020 census. It is part of the Harrisburg metropolitan area.

== History ==
Berrysburg was originally called Hellerstown. The present name is for the Berry family of settlers.

The Romberger-Stover House was added to the National Register of Historic Places in 1980.

== Geography ==
Berrysburg is located in the eastern part of Mifflin Township, in northern Dauphin County at 40°36′9″N 76°48′41″W (40.602475, -76.811309). Berrysburg as a borough is a separate municipality from the township. The Mahantango Mountain lies 2 miles (3 km) to the north. Pennsylvania Routes 25 and 225 intersect in the borough; PA 25 leads east 5 miles (8 km) to Gratz and west 9 miles (14 km) to Millersburg on the Susquehanna River, while PA 225 leads north 3 miles (5 km) to Pillow and south 4 miles (6 km) to Elizabethville. Harrisburg, the state capital and Dauphin County seat, is 30 miles (48 km) to the south.

According to the U.S. Census Bureau, the borough has a total area of 0.62 square miles (1.6 km^{2}), all land.

== Demographics ==
Historical population
Census	Pop.	Note	%±
1870	451		—
1880	476		5.5%
1890	426		−10.5%
1900	398		−6.6%
1910	377		−5.3%
1920	329		−12.7%
1930	395		20.1%
1940	426		7.8%
1950	386		−9.4%
1960	434		12.4%
1970	443		2.1%
1980	447		0.9%
1990	376		−15.9%
2000	354		−5.9%
2010	368		4.0%
2020	326		−11.4%
2021 (est.)	324	▼	−0.6%

As of the census of 2000, there were 354 people, 144 households, and 102 families residing in the borough. The population density was 519.5 inhabitants per square mile (200.6/km^{2}). There were 152 housing units at an average density of 223.0 per square mile (86.1/km^{2}). The racial makeup of the borough was 99.15% White, 0.56% African American and 0.28% Native American. Hispanic or Latino of any race were 0.28% of the population.

There were 144 households, out of which 27.8% had children under the age of 18 living with them, 61.8% were married couples living together, 7.6% had a female householder with no husband present, and 28.5% were non-families. 22.2% of all households were made up of individuals, and 11.1% had someone living alone who was 65 years of age or older. The average household size was 2.41 and the average family size was 2.83.

In the borough the population was spread out, with 19.5% under the age of 18, 5.6% from 18 to 24, 30.8% from 25 to 44, 25.1% from 45 to 64, and 18.9% who were 65 years of age or older. The median age was 41 years. For every 100 females, there were 93.4 males. For every 100 females age 18 and over, there were 95.2 males.

The median income for a household in the borough was $33,281, and the median income for a family was $42,250. Males had a median income of $29,911 versus $25,000 for females. The per capita income for the borough was $17,269. About 5.1% of families and 8.6% of the population were below the poverty line, including none of those under age 18 and 21.4% of those age 65 or over.
