= Mandata, Pennsylvania =

Unincorporated community in Pennsylvania, US

- Unincorporated community
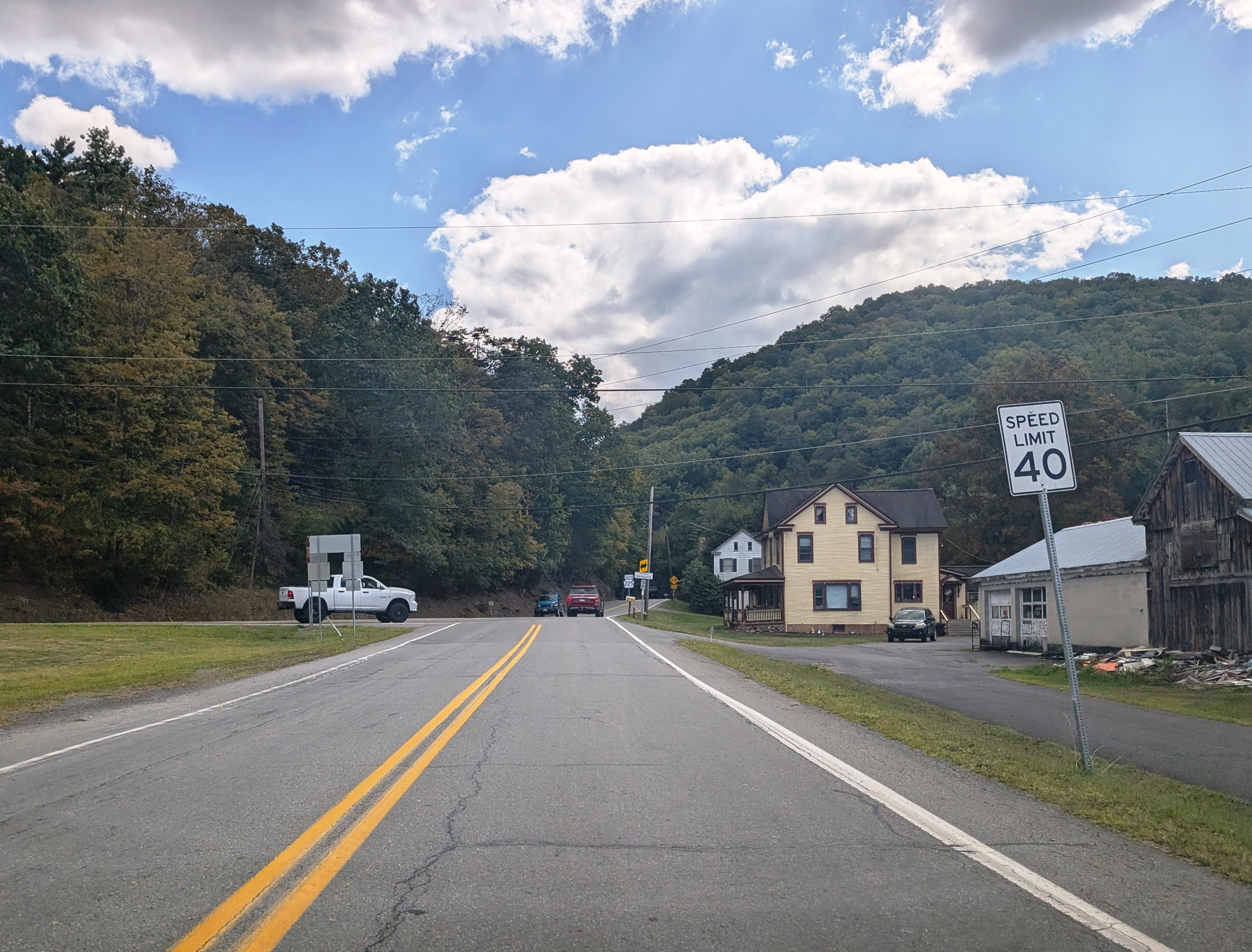
- PA 225 southbound entering Mandata

- Location within Pennsylvania
- Coordinates: 40°41′00″N 76°49′36″W
- Country: United States
- State: Pennsylvania
- County: Northumberland
- Elevation: 627 ft (191 m)
- Time zone: UTC-5 (Eastern (EST))
  - Summer (DST): UTC-4 (EDT)
- ZIP code: 17080
- Area code: 570

Mandata is an unincorporated community in Northumberland County, in the U.S. state of Pennsylvania.

== History ==
By 1891, a portion of Mandata, Pennsylvania was included in Jordan Township, Northumberland County with other sections of that community split between Jackson Township and Lower Mahanoy townships. Jordan Township's post office was located in the town of Jordan; its postmaster at that time, Noah Klock, had held the position since that post office was established.
