= Pillow, Pennsylvania =

Borough in Pennsylvania, US

- Borough
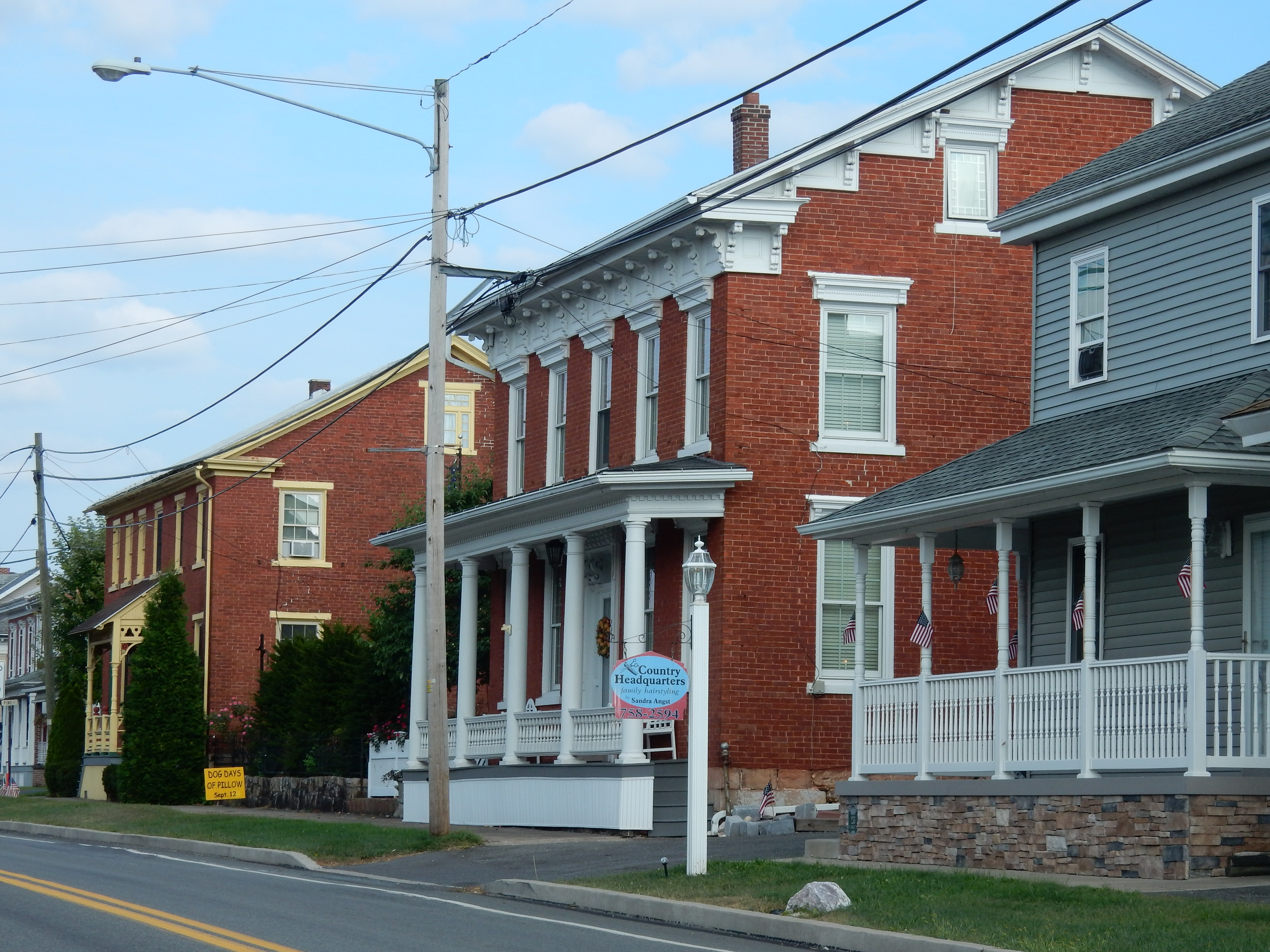
- Market Street in Pillow

- Location in Dauphin County and the U.S. state of Pennsylvania.

- Location in Pennsylvania and the United States Pillow (the United States)
- Coordinates: 40°38′26″N 76°48′12″W
- Country: United States
- State: Pennsylvania
- County: Dauphin
- Settled: 1818
- Incorporated: 1864

Government
  - Type: Borough Council

Area
  - Total: 0.49 sq mi (1.28 km^{2})
  - Land: 0.49 sq mi (1.28 km^{2})
  - Water: 0 sq mi (0.00 km^{2})
- Elevation: 545 ft (166 m)

Population (2020)
  - Total: 292
  - Density: 591.9/sq mi (228.52/km^{2})
- Time zone: UTC-5 (Eastern (EST))
  - Summer (DST): UTC-4 (EDT)
- ZIP code: 17080
- Area code: 570
- FIPS code: 42-60264
- Website: www.pillowpa.org

Pillow is a borough in Dauphin County, Pennsylvania, United States. The population was 291 at the 2020 census. It is part of the Harrisburg–Carlisle Metropolitan Statistical Area.

== History ==
Pillow was founded in 1818 in the eastern part of Mifflin Township, Dauphin County by John Snyder, a land developer from Mercer County, as "Snydertown" (Schneiderschteddel). The borough was incorporated as "Uniontown" on April 20, 1864, becoming a separate municipality from the township.

When the town got its first post office in 1847, post offices under the name of "Snydertown" and "Uniontown" already existed. A postal official substituted the name "Pillow" after General Gideon Pillow, who was popular at the time for his victories in the Mexican–American War. Over the next hundred years, the new name slowly took hold, and on November 2, 1965, the residents voted to change the official name of the town to "Pillow".

During the late 19th and early 20th centuries, Pillow had numerous industries, including a cotton mill, a burial vault manufacturer, a brickworks, and a potato chip factory. Today, the only major industry is the Codi case factory.

== Geography ==
Pillow is the northernmost municipality in Dauphin County, located at 40°38′26″N 76°48′12″W (40.640430, -76.803464). It is bounded on the west, north, and east by Mahantango Creek, a westward-flowing tributary of the Susquehanna River, and on the south by Mahantango Mountain.

Pennsylvania Route 225 passes through the center of the borough, leading northeast 23 miles (37 km) to Shamokin and south 7 miles (11 km) to Elizabethville.

According to the United States Census Bureau, the borough has a total area of 0.49 square miles (1.28 km^{2}), all land.

== Demographics ==
Historical population
Census	Pop.	Note	%±
1870	299		—
1880	367		22.7%
1890	333		−9.3%
1900	359		7.8%
1910	291		−18.9%
1920	295		1.4%
1930	317		7.5%
1940	348		9.8%
1950	323		−7.2%
1960	329		1.9%
1970	332		0.9%
1980	359		8.1%
1990	341		−5.0%
2000	304		−10.9%
2010	298		−2.0%
2020	292		−2.0%
2021 (est.)	290	▼	−0.7%

As of the census of 2000, there were 304 people, 131 households, and 93 families residing in the borough. The population density was 634.6 inhabitants per square mile (245.0/km^{2}). There were 139 housing units at an average density of 290.1 per square mile (112.0/km^{2}). The racial makeup of the borough was 99.67% White, and 0.33% from two or more races.

There were 131 households, out of which 26.0% had children under the age of 18 living with them, 64.1% were married couples living together, 2.3% had a female householder with no husband present, and 29.0% were non-families. 25.2% of all households were made up of individuals, and 10.7% had someone living alone who was 65 years of age or older. The average household size was 2.32 and the average family size was 2.75.

In the borough the population was spread out, with 21.1% under the age of 18, 6.9% from 18 to 24, 29.3% from 25 to 44, 25.7% from 45 to 64, and 17.1% who were 65 years of age or older. The median age was 40 years. For every 100 females, there were 109.7 males. For every 100 females age 18 and over, there were 101.7 males.

The median income for a household in the borough was $39,464, and the median income for a family was $41,000. Males had a median income of $32,500 versus $23,250 for females. The per capita income for the borough was $17,182. About 7.8% of families and 10.2% of the population were below the poverty line, including 5.1% of those under the age of eighteen and 20.4% of those sixty five or over.

== People ==
- Albert F. Buffington, Pennsylvania German lexicographer
