= Dauphin County Bridge No. 27 =

- U.S. National Register of Historic Places
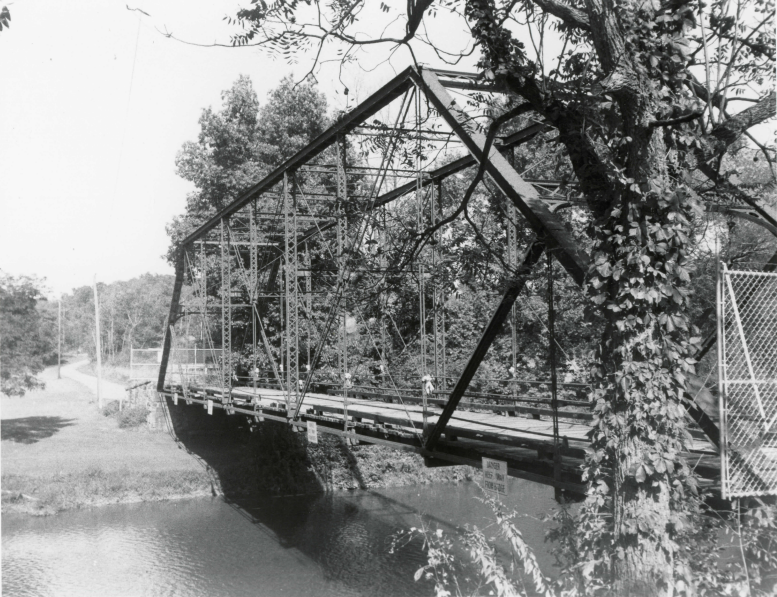
- Dauphin County Bridge 27 in 1992

- Location within Pennsylvania Location within the United States
- Location: Deibler's Dam Road (Mahantango Creek Road) across Mahantango Creek, Mifflin Township and Lower Mahanoy Township, Pennsylvania
- Coordinates: 40.625833°N 76.855748°W
- Area: less than one acre
- Built: 1896
- Built by: Chambersburg Bridge Co.
- Architectural style: Metal Truss Bridge
- NRHP reference No.: 93000720
- Added to NRHP: August 2, 1993

Dauphin County Bridge No. 27, also known as Seaman Bridge, is a historic iron truss bridge spanning Mahantango Creek at Mifflin Township, Dauphin County, Pennsylvania and Lower Mahanoy Township, Northumberland County, Pennsylvania, United States. It has a single span, 162.5-foot-long (49.5 m). The bridge was constructed in 1896, by the Chambersburg Bridge Company of Chambersburg, Pennsylvania. The bridge was closed to vehicular traffic in 1978. After petitions from local residents, it was reopened, but closed again to vehicular traffic in 1983 and to pedestrian traffic in 1992 due to deterioration.

It was added to the National Register of Historic Places in 1993.

== Gallery ==
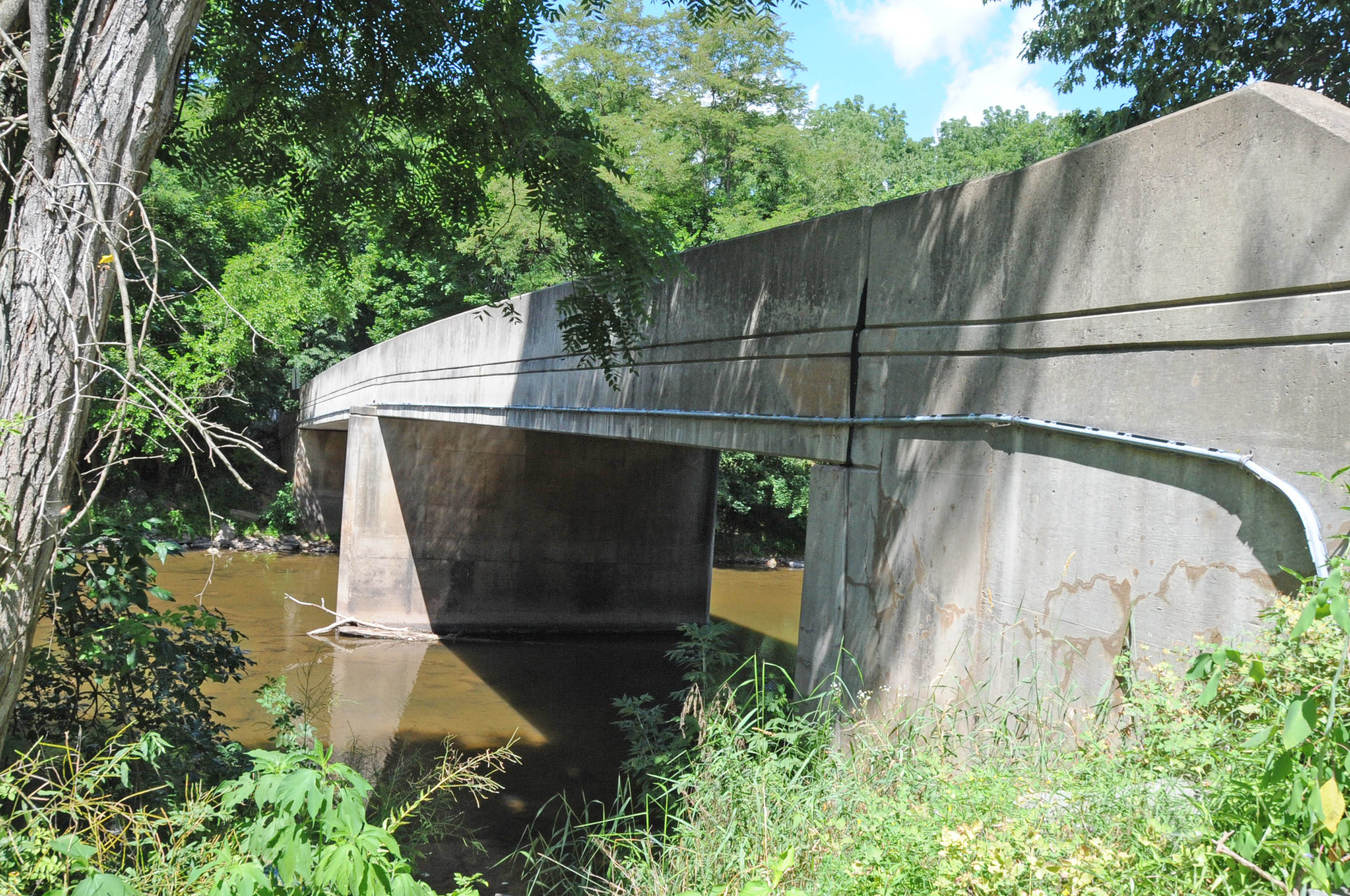
Replacement bridge
