= Mifflin Township, Dauphin County, Pennsylvania =

Township in Pennsylvania, US

Coordinates: 40°36′00″N 76°52′35″W

- Township
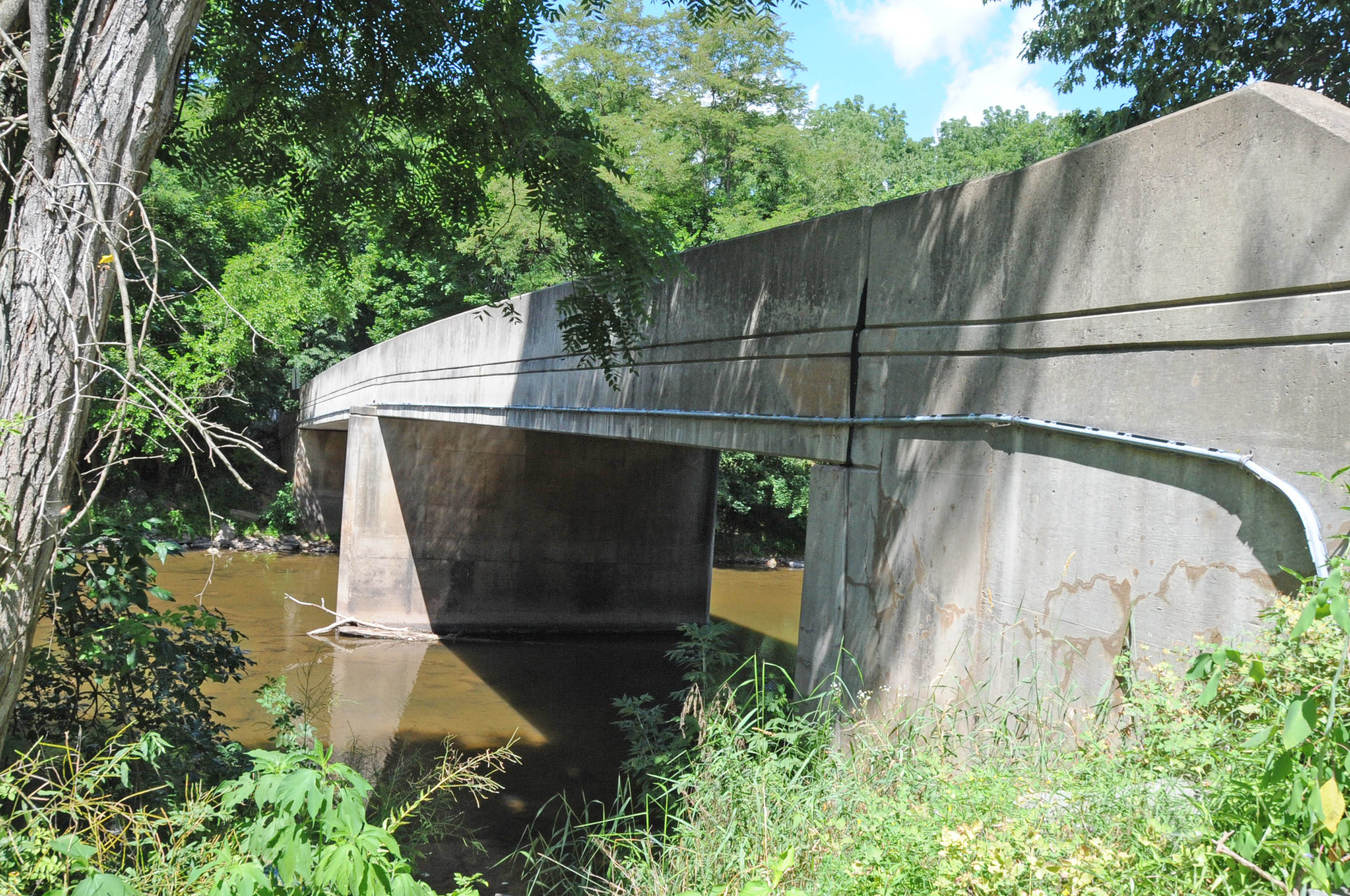
- Bridge on Deibler's Dam Road in Mifflin Township connecting to Lower Mahanoy Township

- Location in Dauphin County and state of Pennsylvania
- Country: United States
- State: Pennsylvania
- County: Dauphin
- Incorporated: 1819

Area
  - Total: 15.50 sq mi (40.14 km^{2})
  - Land: 15.50 sq mi (40.14 km^{2})
  - Water: 0 sq mi (0.00 km^{2})

Population (2020)
  - Total: 817 ▲
  - Estimate (2023): 811
  - Density: 52.4/sq mi (20.23/km^{2})
- Time zone: UTC-5 (Eastern (EST))
  - Summer (DST): UTC-4 (EDT)
- Area code: 717
- FIPS code: 42-043-49264
- Website: https://mifflin-twp.org/

Mifflin Township is a township that is located in Dauphin County, Pennsylvania, United States. The population was 817 at the time of the 2020 census, an increase over the figure of 662 tabulated in 2000.

== History ==
Mifflin Township was named for Thomas Mifflin, the first governor of Pennsylvania.

The Dauphin County Bridge No. 27 was listed on the National Register of Historic Places in 1993.

== Geography ==
Mifflin Township is in northern Dauphin County, bordered to the north by Northumberland County. Mahantango Creek, a west-flowing tributary of the Susquehanna River, forms the northern border of the township. The borough of Berrysburg is located in the eastern part of the township, and the borough of Pillow is situated in the northeastern corner; both boroughs are separate municipalities from the township.

According to the United States Census Bureau, the township has a total area of 15.5 square miles (40.1 km^{2}), all land.

== Demographics ==
Historical population
Census	Pop.	Note	%±
2010	784		—
2020	817		4.2%
2023 (est.)	811		−0.7%
U.S. Decennial Census

As of the census of 2000, there were 662 people, 222 households, and 182 families residing in the township. The population density was 43.1 inhabitants per square mile (16.6/km^{2}). There were 231 housing units at an average density of 15.0/sq mi (5.8/km^{2}). The racial makeup of the township was 98.34% White, 1.21% African American, 0.15% Native American, 0.15% from other races, and 0.15% from two or more races.

There were 222 households, out of which 39.6% had children under the age of 18 living with them, 73.9% were married couples living together, 4.1% had a female householder with no husband present, and 18.0% were non-families. 15.8% of all households were made up of individuals, and 8.6% had someone living alone who was 65 years of age or older. The average household size was 2.98 and the average family size was 3.34.

In the township the population was spread out, with 31.6% under the age of 18, 7.4% from 18 to 24, 27.8% from 25 to 44, 22.4% from 45 to 64, and 10.9% who were 65 years of age or older. The median age was 36 years. For every 100 females, there were 106.2 males. For every 100 females age 18 and over, there were 103.1 males.

The median income for a household in the township was $39,620, and the median income for a family was $43,438. Males had a median income of $31,083 versus $24,643 for females. The per capita income for the township was $15,945. About 5.5% of families and 11.9% of the population were below the poverty line, including 20.5% of those under age 18 and 10.8% of those age 65 or over.
