= Romberger-Stover House =

Historic house in Pennsylvania, United States

- U.S. National Register of Historic Places
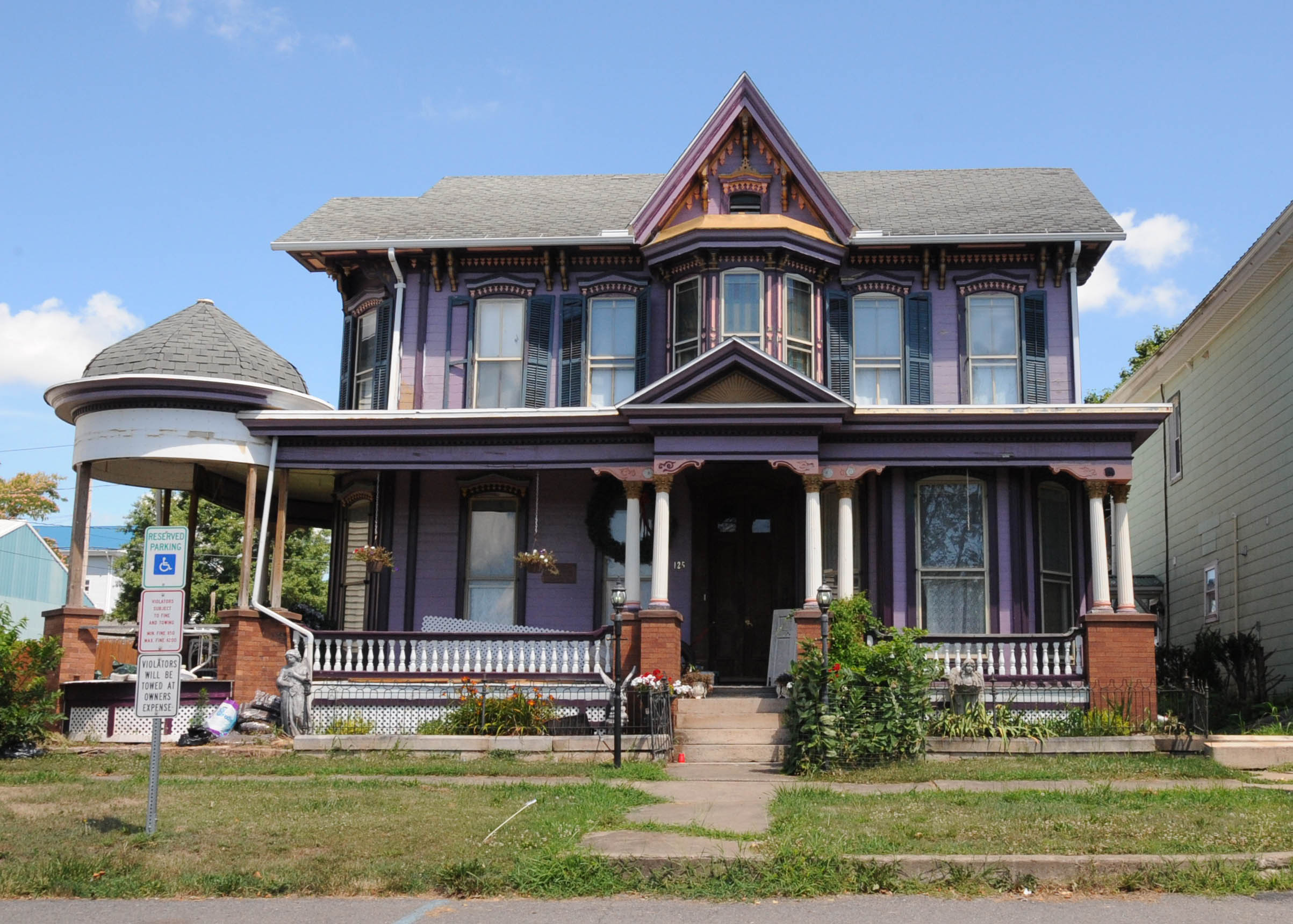

- Location within Pennsylvania Location within the United States
- Location: East Market St., Berrysburg, Pennsylvania
- Coordinates: 40°36′9″N 76°48′41″W
- Area: 0.2 acres (0.081 ha)
- Built: 1842
- Architectural style: Queen Anne, Eclectic
- NRHP reference No.: 80003481
- Added to NRHP: August 29, 1980

Romberger-Stover House is a historic home located at Berrysburg, Dauphin County, Pennsylvania, United States. The original house was built in 1842; it is now the rear wing and measures 20 feet by 24 feet. The main house was added in 1887. It is a two-story, wood-frame Queen Anne-style dwelling measuring 22 feet by 32 feet. It features a porch supported by Corinthian order columns. The porch was added in 1898.

It was added to the National Register of Historic Places in 1980.
