= Trevorton, Pennsylvania =

Unincorporated community in Pennsylvania, US

- Census-designated place
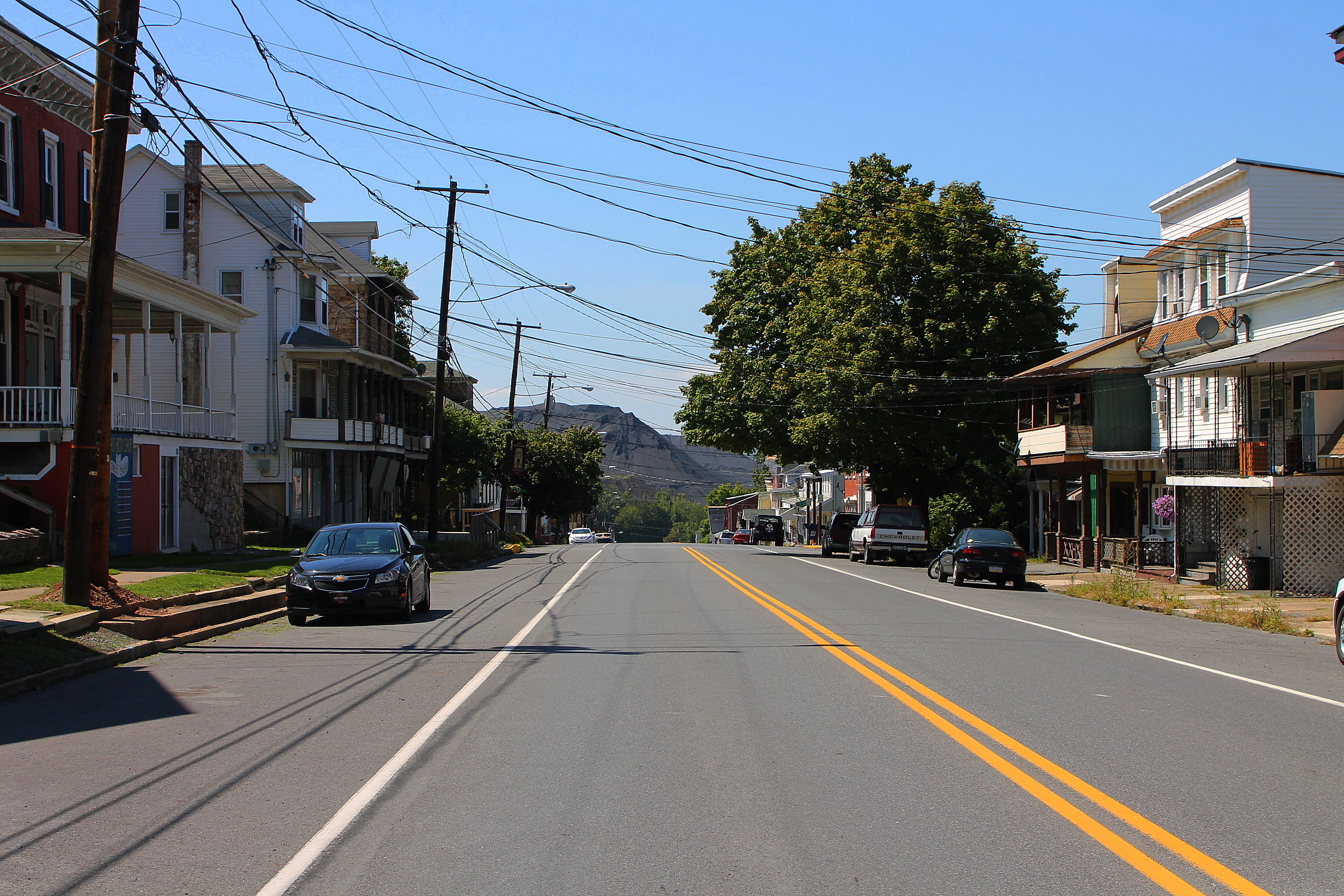
- Pennsylvania Route 225 in Trevorton

- Location within the U.S. state of Pennsylvania Trevorton (the United States)
- Coordinates: 40°46′53″N 76°40′27″W
- Country: United States
- State: Pennsylvania
- County: Northumberland

Area
  - Total: 4.26 sq mi (11.04 km^{2})
  - Land: 4.26 sq mi (11.04 km^{2})
  - Water: 0 sq mi (0.00 km^{2})

Population (2020)
  - Total: 1,759
  - Density: 412.7/sq mi (159.33/km^{2})
- Time zone: UTC-5 (Eastern (EST))
  - Summer (DST): UTC-4 (EDT)
- ZIP code: 17881
- Area codes: 570 and 272
- FIPS code: 42-77448

Trevorton is a census-designated place (CDP) in Zerbe Township, Pennsylvania, United States. The population was 1,834 at the 2010 census.

== Geography ==
Trevorton is located at 40°46′53″N 76°40′27″W (40.781510, -76.674259).

According to the United States Census Bureau, the CDP has a total area of 4.3 square miles (11 km^{2}), all land.

The community is located at the junction of Routes 225 and 890.

== Demographics ==
Historical population
Census	Pop.	Note	%±
1950	2,545		—
1960	2,597		2.0%
1970	2,196		−15.4%
2000	2,010		—
2010	1,834		−8.8%
2020	1,759		−4.1%
U.S. Decennial Census

As of the 2000 census, 2,010 people, 866 households, and 5690 families were residing in Trevorton. The population density was 470.2 inhabitants per square mile (181.5/km^{2}). The 931 housing units had an average density of 217.8 per square mile (84.1/km^{2}). The racial makeup of the CDP was 98.71% White, 0.15% African American, 0.05% Native American, 0.15% Asian, 0.15% from other races, and 0.80% from two or more races. Hispanics or Latinos of any race were 0.40% of the population.

Of the 866 households, 25.2% had children under 18 living with them, 52.5% were married couples living together, 8.3% had a female householder with no husband present, and 35.3% were not families. About 31.6% of all households were made up of individuals, and 16.5% had someone living alone who was 65 or older. The average household size was 2.32, and the average family size was 2.91.

The age distribution was 21.1% under the age of 18, 7.1% from 18 to 24, 27.5% from 25 to 44, 23.9% from 45 to 64, and 20.4% who were 65 or older. The median age was 42 years. For every 100 females, there were 100.4 males. For every 100 females 18 and over, there were 95.1 males.

The median income in the CDP for a household was $32,013 and for a family was $38,143. Males had a median income of $30,236 versus $18,207 for females. The per capita income for the CDP was $15,781. About 6.0% of families and 8.6% of the population were below the poverty line, including 7.9% of those under 18 and 13.5% of those 65 or over.

== Education ==
Trevorton is in the Line Mountain School District. The district's comprehensive secondary school is Line Mountain Jr./Sr. High School.
