= Urban, Pennsylvania =

Unincorporated community in Pennsylvania, US

- Unincorporated community
- Location within Pennsylvania
- Coordinates: 40°40′52″N 76°46′18″W
- Country: United States
- State: Pennsylvania
- County: Northumberland
- Elevation: 664 ft (202 m)
- Time zone: UTC-5 (Eastern (EST))
  - Summer (DST): UTC-4 (EDT)

Urban is an unincorporated community in Northumberland County, in the U.S. state of Pennsylvania.

== History ==
In 1891, the village of Urban was part of Jordan Township, Northumberland County. Located in the northern part of the township, it was home to an old hotel on Tulpehocken Road that had been built during the early 1800s and was owned, that year, by David Schwartz.
