= Elizabethville, Pennsylvania =

Borough in Pennsylvania, US

- Borough
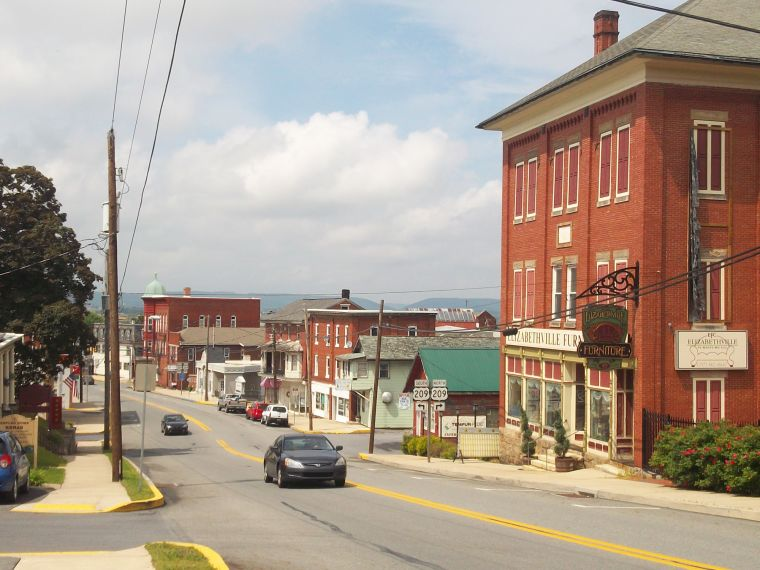

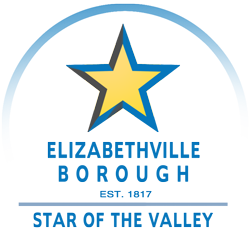
- Seal
- Motto: Star of the Valley
- Location in Dauphin County and the U.S. state of Pennsylvania.

- Location in Pennsylvania and the United States Elizabethville (the United States)
- Coordinates: 40°32′56″N 76°48′54″W
- Country: United States
- State: Pennsylvania
- County: Dauphin
- Settled: 1817
- Incorporated: 1893

Government
  - Type: Borough Council
  - Mayor: Christian Wright
  - Council President: Dennis Henninger: Vice President: Tim Matter, Members: Marie Herb, Peggy Kahler, Mike Leitzel, Mike Stiely.
  - Council Vice President: Tim Matter
  - Water sewer refuse: Patrick Welker
  - Insurance: Kenneth Strine

Area
  - Total: 0.55 sq mi (1.42 km^{2})
  - Land: 0.55 sq mi (1.42 km^{2})
  - Water: 0 sq mi (0.00 km^{2})
- Elevation: 600 ft (180 m)

Population (2020)
  - Total: 1,357
  - Density: 2,478.7/sq mi (957.04/km^{2})
- Time zone: UTC-5 (Eastern (EST))
  - Summer (DST): UTC-4 (EDT)
- ZIP code: 17023
- Area code: 717
- FIPS code: 42-23024
- Website: www.elizabethville.org

Elizabethville is a borough in Dauphin County, Pennsylvania, United States. As of the 2020 census, the borough's population was 1,352. It is part of the Harrisburg metropolitan area.

== History ==
Elizabethville was founded in 1817. It was named for the wife of the original owner of the site. A post office has been in operation at Elizabethville since 1826. The borough was incorporated in 1893.

== Geography ==
Elizabethville is located in northern Dauphin County at 40°32′56″N 76°48′54″W (40.548801, -76.814994), along the northern base of Berry Mountain. U.S. Route 209 passes through the borough, leading east 14 miles (23 km) to Tower City and west 8 miles (13 km) to Millersburg on the Susquehanna River. Pennsylvania Route 225 crosses US 209 in the center of town, leading north 4 miles (6 km) to Berrysburg and southwest 9 miles (14 km) to Halifax on the Susquehanna. Harrisburg, the state capital, is 26 miles (42 km) south via PA 225.

According to the United States Census Bureau, Elizabethville has a total area of 0.54 square miles (1.4 km^{2}), all land.

== Demographics ==
Historical population
Census	Pop.	Note	%±
1900	838		—
1910	1,039		24.0%
1920	1,236		19.0%
1930	1,341		8.5%
1940	1,410		5.1%
1950	1,506		6.8%
1960	1,455		−3.4%
1970	1,629		12.0%
1980	1,531		−6.0%
1990	1,467		−4.2%
2000	1,344		−8.4%
2010	1,510		12.4%
2020	1,357		−10.1%
2021 (est.)	1,350	▼	−0.5%

As of the census of 2000, there were 1,344 people, 579 households, and 353 families residing in the borough. The population density was 2,476.2 inhabitants per square mile (956.1/km^{2}). There were 617 housing units at an average density of 1,136.8 per square mile (438.9/km^{2}). The racial makeup of the borough was 97.84% Caucasian, 0.30% African American, 0.89% Asian, 0.22% from other races, and 0.74% from two or more races. Hispanic or Latino of any race were 1.19% of the population.

There were 579 households, out of which 29.7% had children under the age of 18 living with them, 47.7% were married couples living together, 9.7% had a female householder with no husband present, and 39.0% were non-families. 33.0% of all households were made up of individuals, and 16.4% had someone living alone who was 65 years of age or older. The average household size was 2.26 and the average family size was 2.91.

In the borough the population was spread out, with 23.1% under the age of 18, 8.5% from 18 to 24, 28.8% from 25 to 44, 20.8% from 45 to 64, and 18.8% who were 65 years of age or older. The median age was 37 years. For every 100 females, there were 90.6 males. For every 100 females age 18 and over, there were 84.5 males.

The median income for a household in the borough was $31,406, and the median income for a family was $40,625. Males had a median income of $34,659 versus $25,054 for females. The per capita income for the borough was $18,077. About 6.6% of families and 8.7% of the population were below the poverty line, including 8.4% of those under age 18 and 19.5% of those age 65 or over.
