= Zerbe Township, Pennsylvania =

Township in Pennsylvania, US

Coordinates: 40°47′00″N 76°37′59″W

- Township
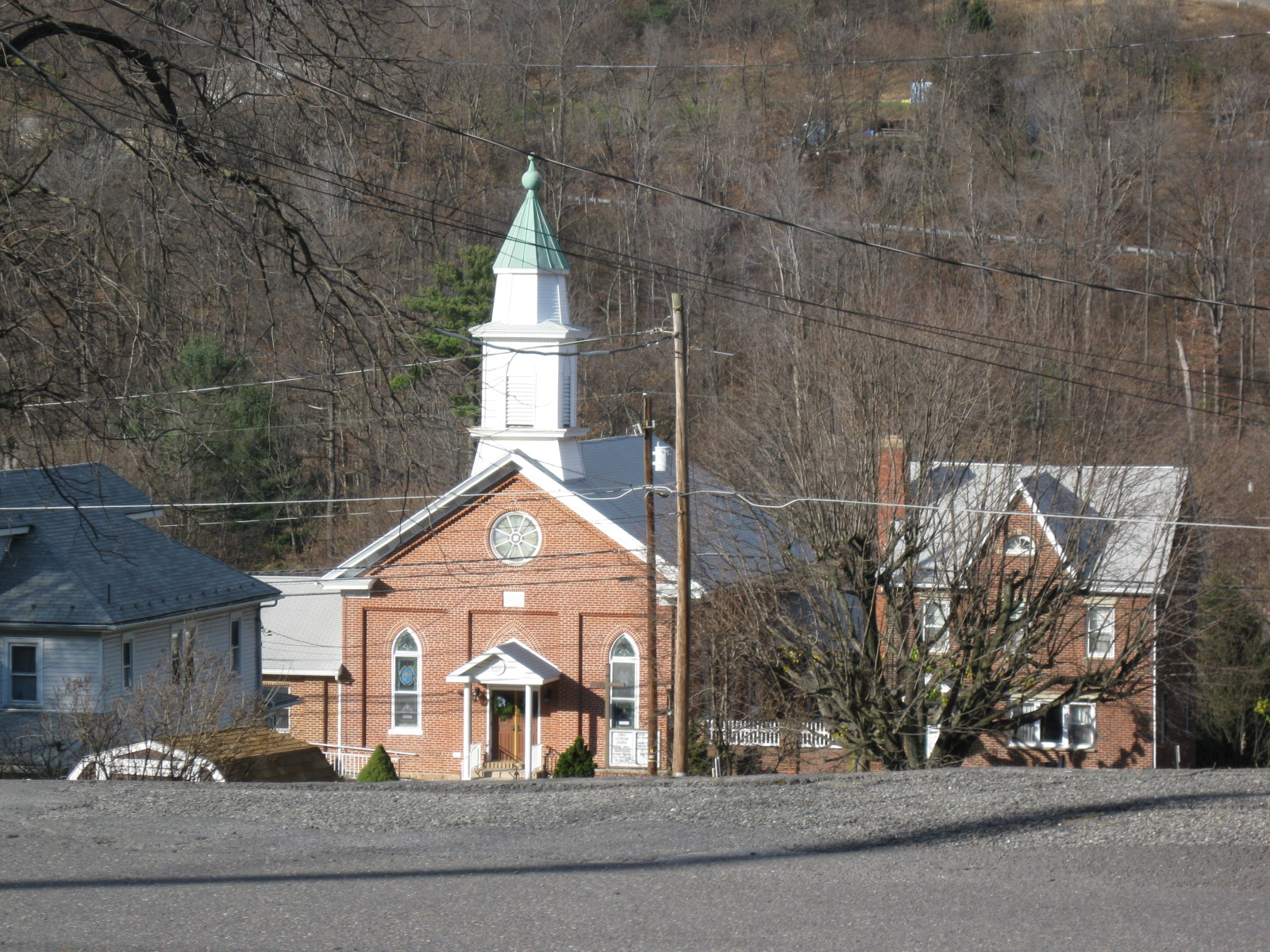
- Trevorton in Zerbe Township

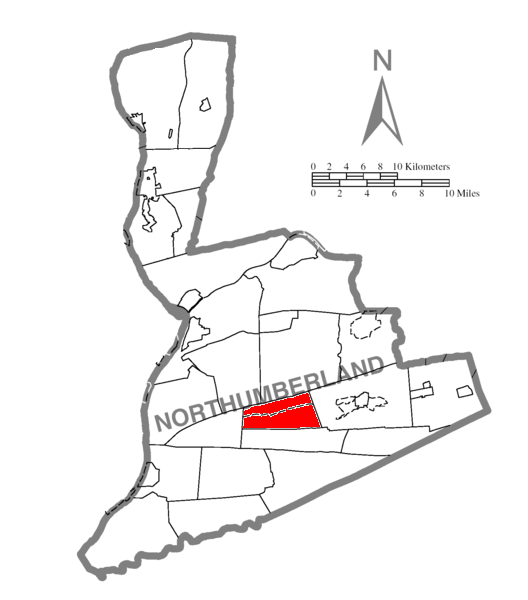
- Map of Northumberland County, Pennsylvania highlighting Zerbe Township

- Map of Northumberland County, Pennsylvania
- Country: United States
- State: Pennsylvania
- County: Northumberland
- Settled: 1800
- Incorporated: 1853

Government
  - Type: Board of Supervisors

Area
  - Total: 11.60 sq mi (30.05 km^{2})
  - Land: 11.58 sq mi (30.00 km^{2})
  - Water: 0.019 sq mi (0.05 km^{2})

Population (2010)
  - Total: 1,872
  - Estimate (2016): 1,814
  - Density: 156.6/sq mi (60.47/km^{2})
- Time zone: UTC-5 (Eastern (EST))
  - Summer (DST): UTC-4 (EDT)
- Area code: 570
- FIPS code: 42-097-87280

Zerbe Township is a township in Northumberland County, Pennsylvania, United States. The population at the 2010 Census was 1,872, down from 2,021 at the 2000 census.

== Geography ==
According to the United States Census Bureau, the township has a total area of 11.6 square miles (30.0 km^{2}), of which 11.6 square miles (30.0 km^{2}) is land and 0.09% is water. It contains the census-designated place of Trevorton.

== Demographics ==
As of the census of 2000, there were 2,021 people, 871 households, and 561 families residing in the township. The population density was 174.4 inhabitants per square mile (67.3/km^{2}). There were 946 housing units at an average density of 81.6 per square mile (31.5/km^{2}). The racial makeup of the township was 98.71% White, 0.15% African American, 0.05% Native American, 0.15% Asian, 0.15% from other races, and 0.79% from two or more races. Hispanic or Latino of any race were 0.40% of the population.

There were 871 households, out of which 25.3% had children under the age of 18 living with them, 52.4% were married couples living together, 8.4% had a female householder with no husband present, and 35.5% were non-families. 31.8% of all households were made up of individuals, and 16.5% had someone living alone who was 65 years of age or older. The average household size was 2.32 and the average family size was 2.92.

In the township the population was spread out, with 21.2% under the age of 18, 7.0% from 18 to 24, 27.6% from 25 to 44, 23.8% from 45 to 64, and 20.3% who were 65 years of age or older. The median age was 42 years. For every 100 females, there were 100.5 males. For every 100 females age 18 and over, there were 95.1 males.

The median income for a household in the township was $31,964, and the median income for a family was $38,000. Males had a median income of $30,236 versus $18,207 for females. The per capita income for the township was $15,780. About 6.0% of families and 8.6% of the population were below the poverty line, including 7.8% of those under age 18 and 13.5% of those age 65 or over.

Historical population
Census	Pop.	Note	%±
2000	2,021		—
2010	1,872		−7.4%
2020	1,802		−3.7%
U.S. Decennial Census

== Notable person ==
- Sparky Adams, baseball infielder/outfielder in the National League during the 1920s and 1930s
