= Jackson Township, Northumberland County, Pennsylvania =

Township in Pennsylvania, US

Coordinates: 40°43′00″N 76°47′59″W

- Township
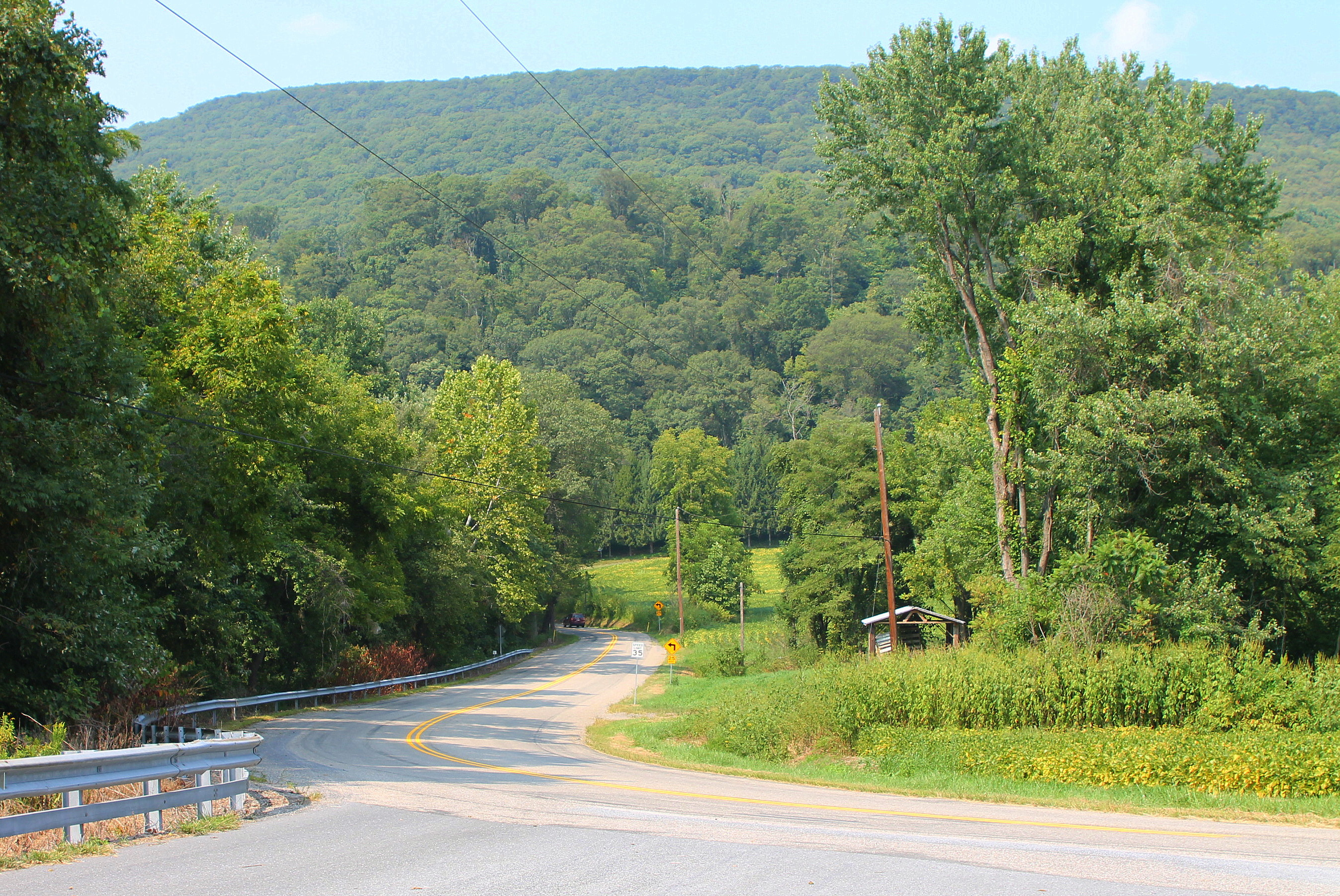
- Herndon Bypass Road and Little Mountain

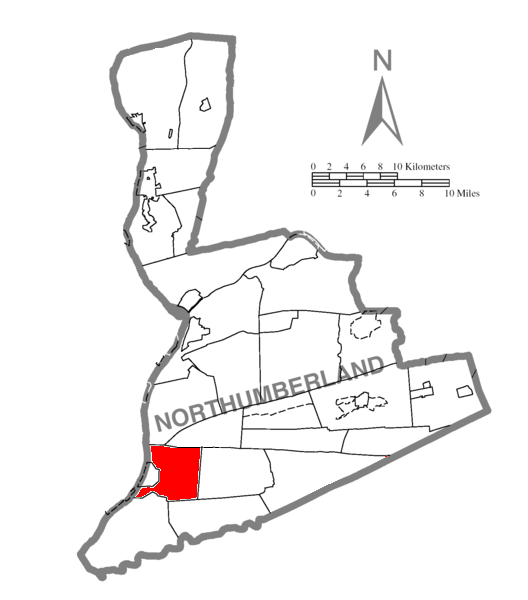
- Map of Northumberland County, Pennsylvania highlighting Jackson Township

- Map of Northumberland County, Pennsylvania
- Country: United States
- State: Pennsylvania
- County: Northumberland
- Settled: 1775
- Incorporated: 1836

Government
  - Type: Board of Supervisors

Area
  - Total: 14.15 sq mi (36.66 km^{2})
  - Land: 12.58 sq mi (32.58 km^{2})
  - Water: 1.58 sq mi (4.08 km^{2})

Population (2010)
  - Total: 875
  - Estimate (2016): 874
  - Density: 69.5/sq mi (26.82/km^{2})
- Time zone: UTC-5 (Eastern (EST))
  - Summer (DST): UTC-4 (EDT)
- Area code: 570
- FIPS code: 42-097-37432

Jackson Township is a township in Northumberland County, Pennsylvania, United States. The population at the time of the 2010 Census was 875, which documented a decline in population from the figure of 928 that was tabulated in 2000.

== Geography ==
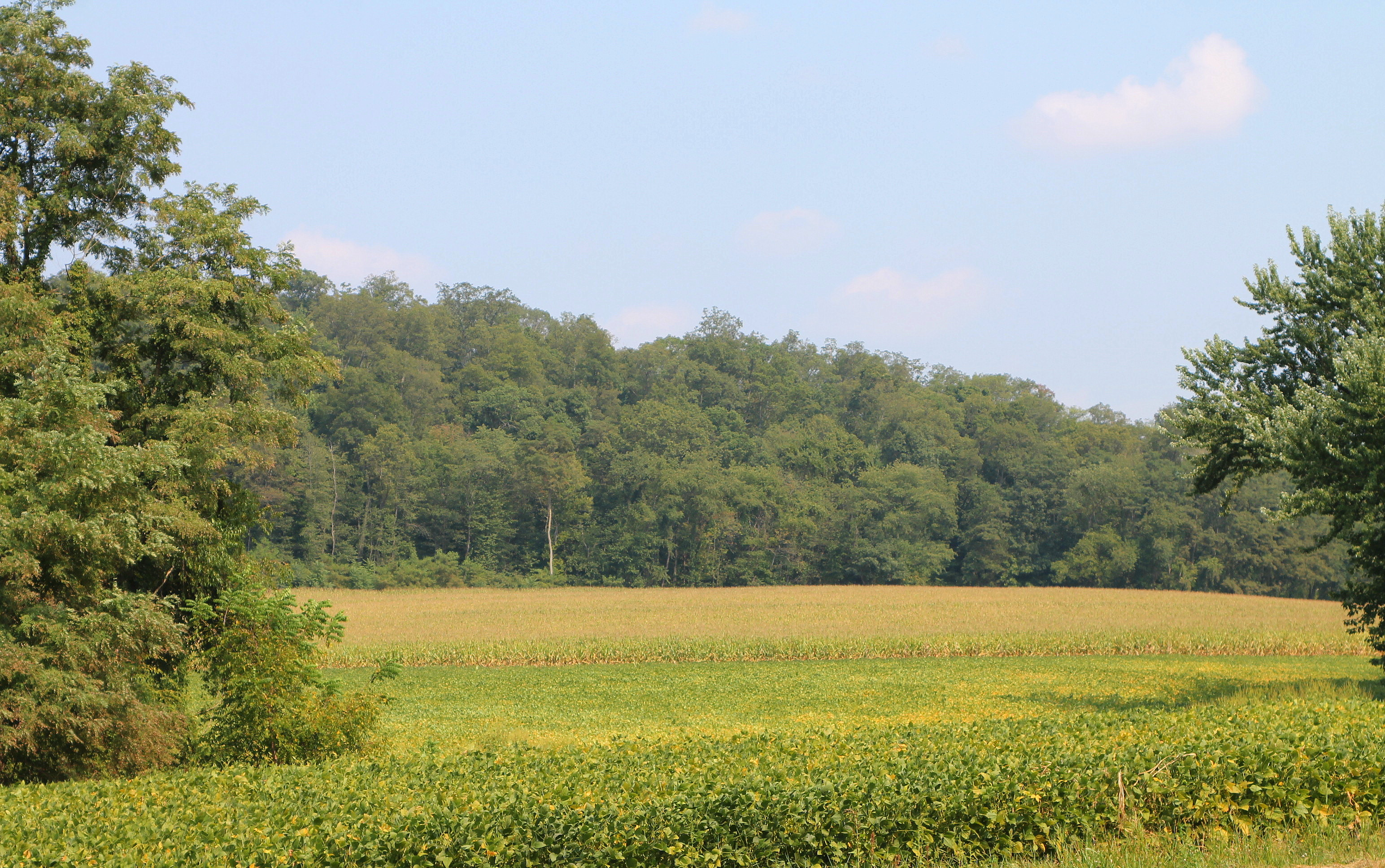
Scenery of Jackson Township from Herndon Bypass Road

According to the United States Census Bureau, the township has a total area of 14.2 square miles (37 km^{2}), of which 12.8 square miles (33 km^{2}) is land and 1.5 square miles (3.9 km^{2}) (10.27%) is water.

== Demographics ==
Historical population
Census	Pop.	Note	%±
2010	875		—
2016 (est.)	874		−0.1%
U.S. Decennial Census

As of the census of 2000, there were 928 people, 348 households, and 261 families residing in the township.

The population density was 72.8 inhabitants per square mile (28.1/km^{2}). There were 373 housing units at an average density of 29.3 per square mile (11.3/km^{2}).

The racial makeup of the township was 98.38% White, 0.11% African American, 0.11% Native American, 0.54% Asian, 0.11% from other races, and 0.75% from two or more races. Hispanic or Latino of any race were 0.54% of the population.

There were 348 households, out of which 32.8% had children under the age of eighteen living with them; 67.5% were married couples living together, 4.6% had a female householder with no husband present, and 25.0% were non-families. 22.7% of all households were made up of individuals, and 13.5% had someone living alone who was sixty-five years of age or older.

The average household size was 2.58 and the average family size was 3.06.

Within the township, the population was spread out, with 26.6% who were under the age of eighteen, 5.2% who were aged eighteen to twenty-four, 28.2% who were aged twenty-five to forty-four, 24.8% who were aged forty-five to sixty-four, and 15.2% who were sixty-five years of age or older. The median age was thirty-nine years.

For every one hundred females, there were 100.4 males. For every one hundred females who were aged eighteen or older, there were 96.3 males.

The median income for a household in the township was $36,528, and the median income for a family was $44,091. Males had a median income of $32,014 compared with that of $21,944 for females.

The per capita income for the township was $16,039.

Approximately 8.3% of families and 15.4% of the population were living below the poverty line, including 16.8% of those who were under the age of eighteen and 8.2% of those who were aged sixty-five or older.
