= Lower Mahanoy Township, Pennsylvania =

Township in Pennsylvania, US

Coordinates: 40°40′00″N 76°52′59″W

- Township
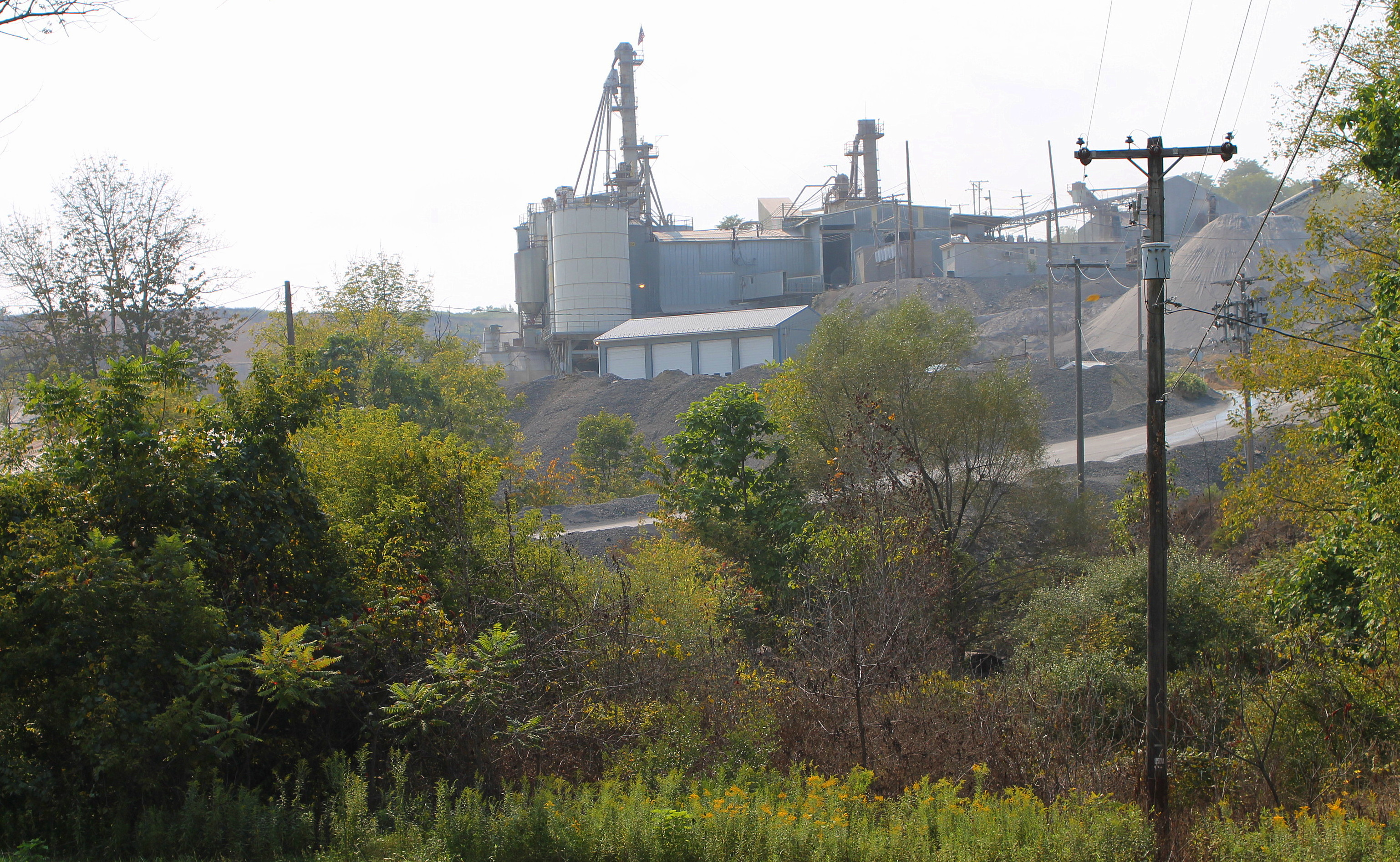
- Quarry in Lower Mahanoy Township

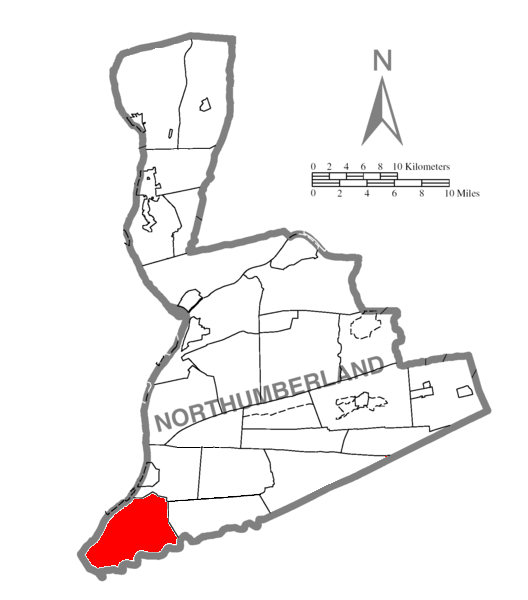
- Map of Northumberland County, Pennsylvania highlighting Lower Mahanoy Township

- Map of Northumberland County, Pennsylvania
- Country: United States
- State: Pennsylvania
- County: Northumberland
- Settled: 1777
- Incorporated: 1806

Government
  - Type: Board of Supervisors

Area
  - Total: 25.60 sq mi (66.31 km^{2})
  - Land: 21.82 sq mi (56.51 km^{2})
  - Water: 3.78 sq mi (9.80 km^{2})

Population (2010)
  - Total: 1,709
  - Estimate (2016): 1,668
  - Density: 76.5/sq mi (29.52/km^{2})
- Time zone: UTC-5 (Eastern (EST))
  - Summer (DST): UTC-4 (EDT)
- Area code: 570
- FIPS code: 42-097-44960

Lower Mahanoy Township is a township in Northumberland County, Pennsylvania, United States. The population at the 2010 Census was 1,709, an increase over the figure of 1,586 tabulated in 2000.

== History ==
The Dauphin County Bridge No. 27 was listed on the National Register of Historic Places in 1993.

== Geography ==
According to the United States Census Bureau, the township has a total area of 25.5 square miles (65.9 km^{2}), of which 21.9 square miles (56.8 km^{2}) is land and 3.5 square miles (9.2 km^{2}) (13.90%) is water. It contains the census-designated place of Dalmatia.

== Demographics ==
Historical population
Census	Pop.	Note	%±
2010	1,709		—
2016 (est.)	1,668		−2.4%
U.S. Decennial Census

As of the census of 2000, there were 1,586 people, 634 households, and 486 families residing in the township. The population density was 72.3 inhabitants per square mile (27.9/km^{2}). There were 691 housing units at an average density of 31.5 per square mile (12.2/km^{2}). The racial makeup of the township was 99.43% White, 0.38% African American, 0.06% from other races, and 0.13% from two or more races. Hispanic or Latino of any race were 0.19% of the population.

There were 634 households, out of which 29.7% had children under the age of 18 living with them, 67.5% were married couples living together, 5.0% had a female householder with no husband present, and 23.3% were non-families. 19.9% of all households were made up of individuals, and 9.1% had someone living alone who was 65 years of age or older. The average household size was 2.50 and the average family size was 2.85.

In the township the population was spread out, with 22.2% under the age of 18, 7.4% from 18 to 24, 28.0% from 25 to 44, 26.5% from 45 to 64, and 15.9% who were 65 years of age or older. The median age was 40 years. For every 100 females, there were 104.9 males. For every 100 females age 18 and over, there were 103.3 males.

The median income for a household in the township was $39,279, and the median income for a family was $43,750. Males had a median income of $31,183 versus $21,250 for females. The per capita income for the township was $17,097. About 2.6% of families and 6.0% of the population were below the poverty line, including 7.7% of those under age 18 and 7.7% of those age 65 or over.
