= Muddy Run (Spruce Run tributary) =

River in Pennsylvania, U.S.

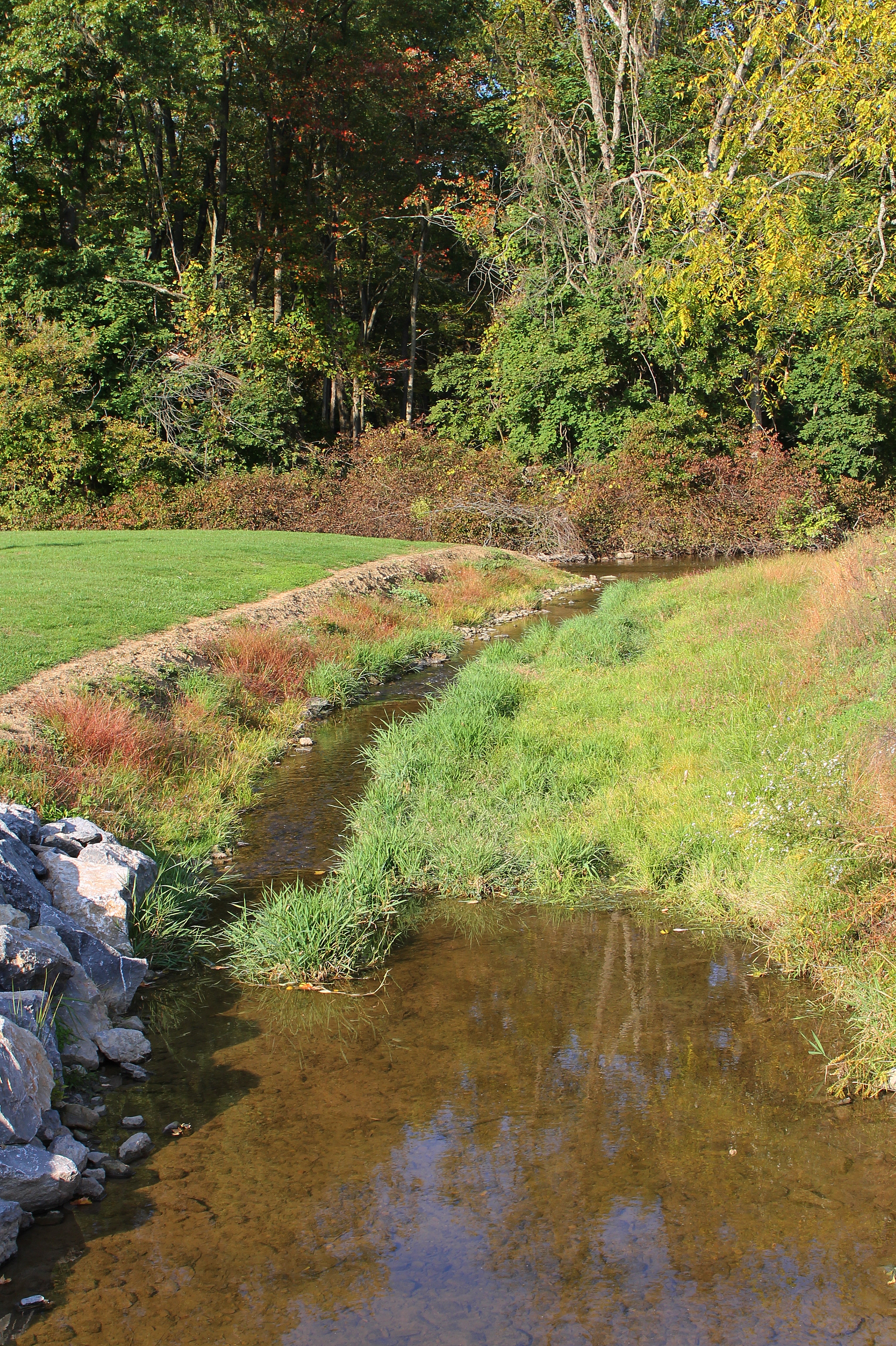
- Muddy Run at its mouth, with Spruce Run visible in the background

Physical characteristics
- Source
  - location: near the base of Buffalo Mountain in West Buffalo Township, Union County, Pennsylvania
  - elevation: between 780 and 800 feet (238 and 244 m)
- Mouth
  - location: Spruce Run in Buffalo Township, Union County, Pennsylvania
  - coordinates: 40°58′47″N 76°59′02″W
  - elevation: 486 ft (148 m)
- Length: 4.8 mi (7.7 km)
- Basin size: 4.57 sq mi (11.8 km^{2})

Basin features
- Progression: Spruce Run → Buffalo Creek → West Branch Susquehanna River → Susquehanna River → Chesapeake Bay

Muddy Run is a tributary of Spruce Run in Union County, Pennsylvania, in the United States. It is approximately 4.8 miles (7.7 km) long and flows through West Buffalo Township and Buffalo Township. The watershed of the stream has an area of 4.57 square miles (11.8 km^{2}). Part of the stream is designated as an impaired waterbody due to sedimentation and siltation from grazing-related agriculture. The majority of the watershed is forested, but there is also a considerable amount of agricultural land. A bridge has been constructed over the stream in the community of Mazeppa.

== Course ==
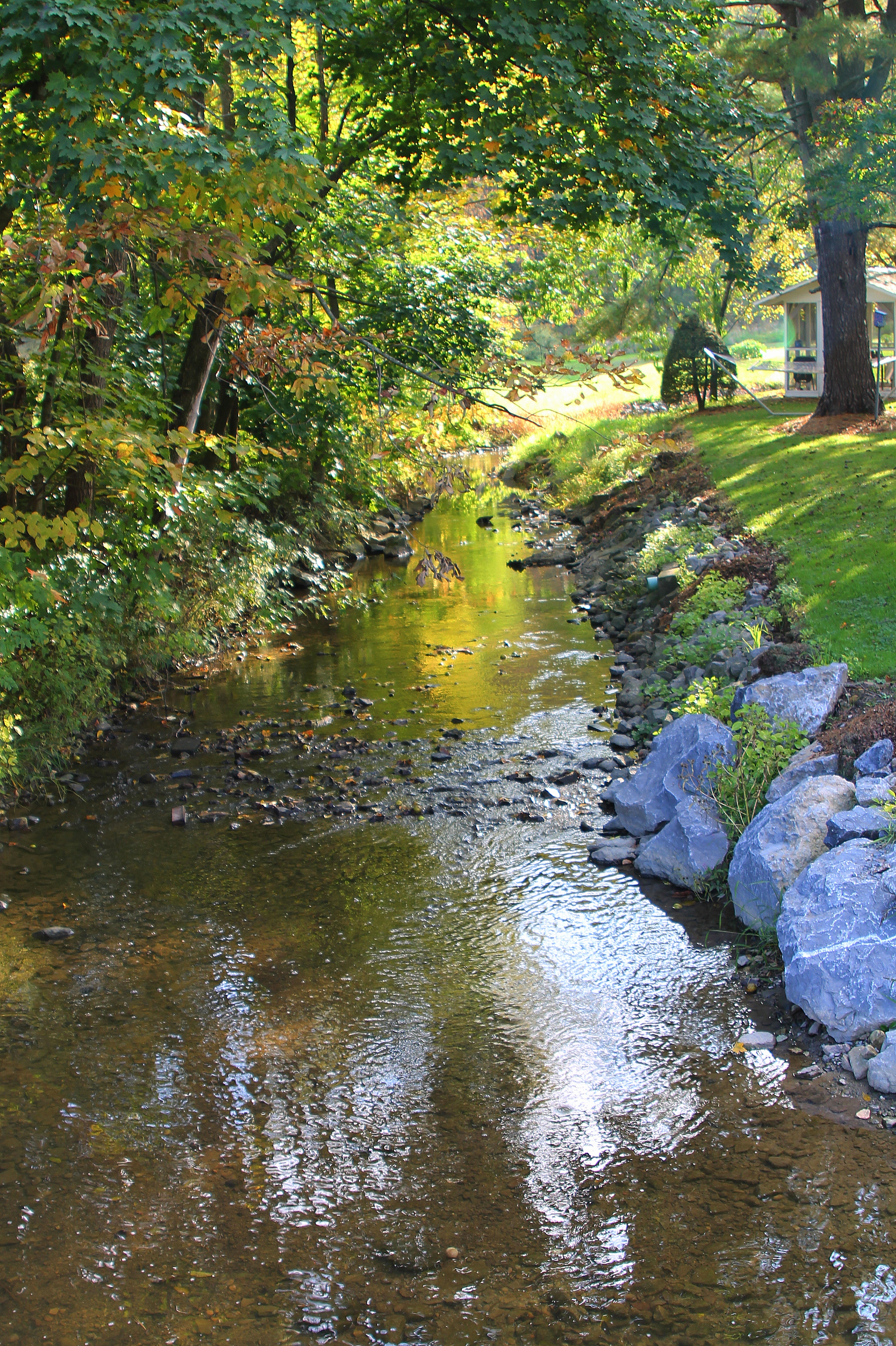
Muddy Run looking upstream near its mouth

Muddy Run begins near the base of Buffalo Mountain in West Buffalo Township. It flows east-southeast for several tenths of a mile before turning east-northeast and then east-southeast. Several tenths of a mile further downstream, the stream turns south-southeast for a few tenths of a mile before entering Buffalo Township and turning east for a few miles. It then turns southeast for several tenths of a mile before turning northeast. Several hundred feet further downstream, it reaches its confluence with Spruce Run.

Muddy Run joins Spruce Run 0.34 miles (0.55 km) upstream of its mouth.

== Hydrology ==
A total of 2.6 miles (4.2 km) of streams in the watershed of Muddy Run are designated as impaired waterbodies. The cause of the impairment is sedimentation/siltation and the source of the impairment is grazing-related agriculture. The total maximum daily load date is 2015. In addition to sediment, Muddy Run is also affected by E. coli, nutrient pollution, and thermal radiation.

In 2000, the load of sediment in Muddy Run was 526,669 pounds (238,893 kg), while in 2008 it was 494,901 pounds (224,483 kg). This equates to somewhere between 150 and 200 pounds per acre (170 and 220 kg/ha). In the future, the load could be reduced by 50.30 percent to 245,956 pounds (111,564 kg) per year. In 2000, the nitrogen load in the stream was 37,176 pounds (16,863 kg) and in 2008, it was 36,879 pounds (16,728 kg). This equates to somewhere between 10 and 15 pounds per acre (11 and 17 kg/ha). In the future, the nitrogen load could be reduced by 20.26 percent to 29,406 pounds (13,338 kg) per year. In 2000 and 2008, the phosphorus load was 1,372 and 1,343 pounds (622 and 609 kg), respectively. This equates to more than 0.4 pounds per acre (0.45 kg/ha). In the future, the phosphorus load could be reduced by 37.53 percent to 839 pounds (381 kg) per year.

Of the 526,669 pounds (238,893 kg) of sediment in Muddy Run in 2000, 247,195 pounds (112,126 kg) came from row crops and 144,298 pounds (65,452 kg) came from streambank erosion. Another 32,677 pounds (14,822 kg) came from hay and pastures, while 11,133 pounds (5,050 kg) came from unpaved roads. A total of 8,838 pounds (4,009 kg) came from low-density urban development, while 82,528 pounds (37,434 kg) came from other sources.

In 2000, the total load of nitrogen in Muddy Run from groundwater was 14,221 pounds (6,451 kg). The load from row crops was 1,588 pounds (720 kg) and the load from hay and pastures was 983 pounds (446 kg). The nitrogen load from low-density urban development was 85 pounds (39 kg), the load from unpaved roads was 45 pounds (20 kg), and the load from septic systems was 44 pounds (20 kg). A total of 7 pounds (3.2 kg) came from streambank erosion and 431 pounds (195 kg) came from other sources.

In 2000, the total load of phosphorus in Muddy Run from row crops was 250 pounds (110 kg) and the load from groundwater was 229 pounds (104 kg). The load from hay and pastures was 99 pounds (45 kg), the load from low-density urban land was 14 pounds (6.4 kg), 7 pounds (3.2 kg) came from unpaved roads, and 6 pounds (2.7 kg) came from septic systems. Other sources contributed 3 pounds (1.4 kg).

== Geography and geology ==
The elevation near the mouth of Muddy Run is 486 feet (148 m) above sea level. The elevation of the stream's source is between 780 and 800 feet (238 and 244 m) above sea level.

A total of 0.2 miles (0.32 km) of streams in the watershed of Muddy Run are flanked by fences, though this could eventually increase to 4.3 miles (6.9 km). Stabilization occurs on only 0.1 miles (0.16 km) of streams, though this could increase to 9.7 miles (15.6 km) in the future.

== Watershed and biology ==
The watershed of Muddy Run has an area of 4.57 square miles (11.8 km^{2}). The mouth of the stream is in the United States Geological Survey quadrangle of Lewisburg. However, the source is in the quadrangle of Mifflinburg. The watershed makes up 3 percent of the watershed of Buffalo Creek. There are 9.7 miles (15.6 km) of streams in the watershed of Muddy Run, of which 4.3 miles (6.9 km) are in agricultural land.

A total of 57 percent of the watershed of Muddy Run is on forested land. Another 35 percent is on agricultural land, while 3 percent is on impervious surfaces. The amount of land on impervious surfaces could be as high as 26 percent in the future. There is a field lane improvement project on 1,625 feet (495 m) of Muddy Run. A total of 227 acres (92 ha) of agricultural land in the watershed is on slopes of more than 3 percent. There are 1.2 miles (1.9 km) of unpaved roads in the stream's watershed.

A total of 2.4 miles (3.9 km) of streams in the watershed of Muddy Run have riparian buffering, but this could increase to as much as 4.3 miles (6.9 km) in the future.

== History ==
Muddy Run was entered into the Geographic Names Information System on August 2, 1979. Its identifier in the Geographic Names Information System is 1182059. While some deeds reference Muddy Run as the name, the original name was Armstrong Run, as depicted on an official survey map of Union County dated 1874. Armstrong Run is also the name referenced in the landowners and residents map published in 1868 by Pomeroy and Beers of Philadelphia.

A concrete stringer/multi-beam or girder bridge carrying State Route 1001 was constructed over Muddy Run in Mazeppa in 1932. It is 24 feet (7.3 m) long.

== See also ==
- Black Run (Spruce Run), next tributary of Spruce Run going upstream
- List of rivers of Pennsylvania
