= Black Run (Spruce Run tributary) =

Black Run Blacks Run
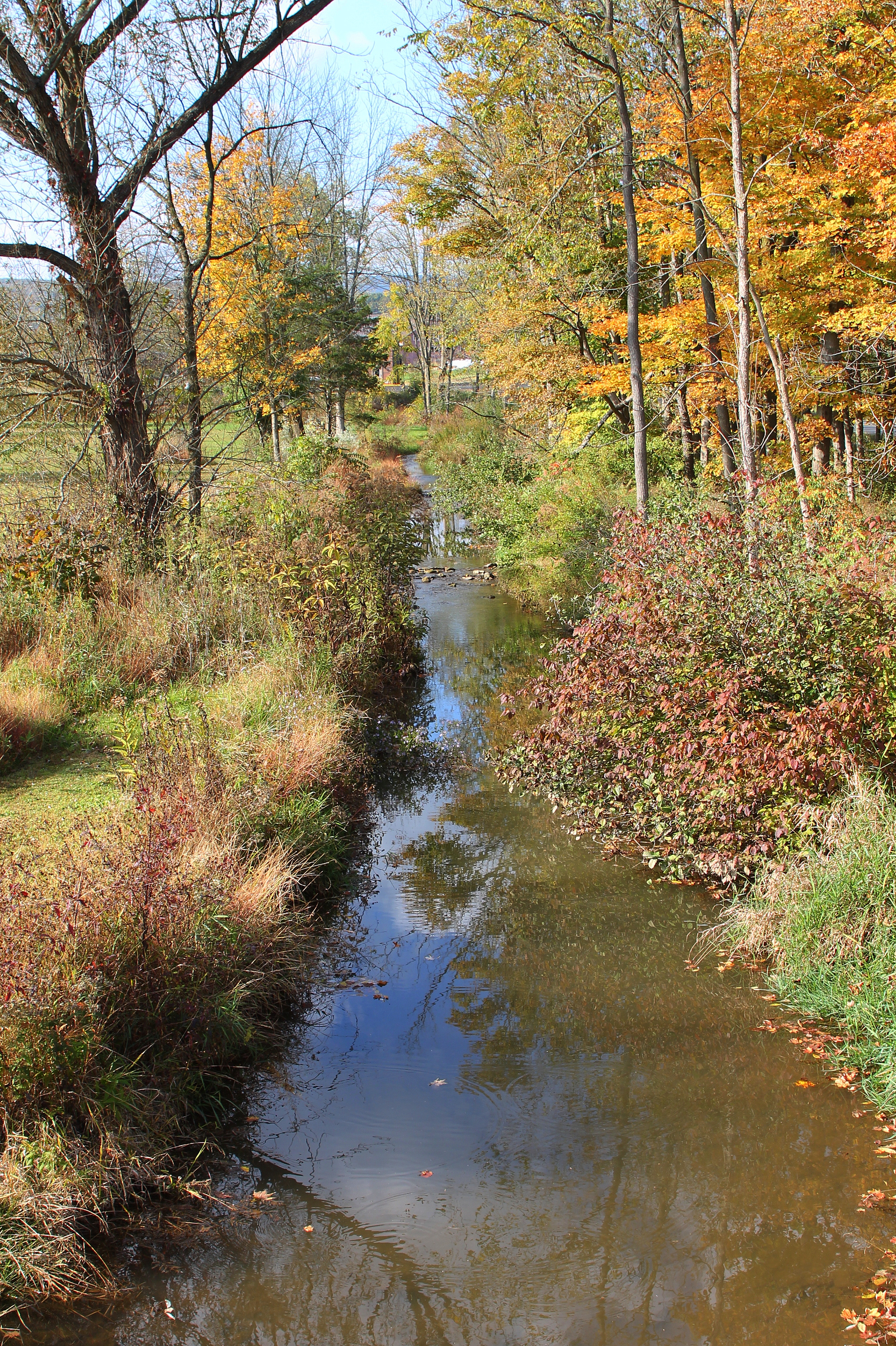
- Black Run in its lower reaches

Physical characteristics
- Source
  - location: Buffalo Mountain in West Buffalo Township, Union County, Pennsylvania
  - elevation: between 1,520 and 1,540 feet (460 and 470 m)
- Mouth
  - location: Spruce Run in Buffalo Township, Union County, Pennsylvania
  - coordinates: 40°59′09″N 76°59′03″W
  - elevation: 502 ft (153 m)
- Length: 4.7 mi (7.6 km)
- Basin size: 4.72 mi^{2} (12.2 km^{2})

Basin features
- Progression: Spruce Run → Buffalo Creek → West Branch Susquehanna River → Susquehanna River → Chesapeake Bay
- Tributaries
  - left: two unnamed tributaries

Black Run (also known as Black's Run) is a tributary of Spruce Run in Union County, Pennsylvania, in the United States. It is approximately 4.7 miles (7.6 km) long and flows through West Buffalo Township and Buffalo Township. The watershed of the stream has an area of 4.72 square miles (12.2 km^{2}). The stream has two unnamed tributaries and is not designated as an impaired waterbody. Its watershed is mostly forested, but there is some agricultural land. A few bridges have been constructed across the stream.

== Course ==
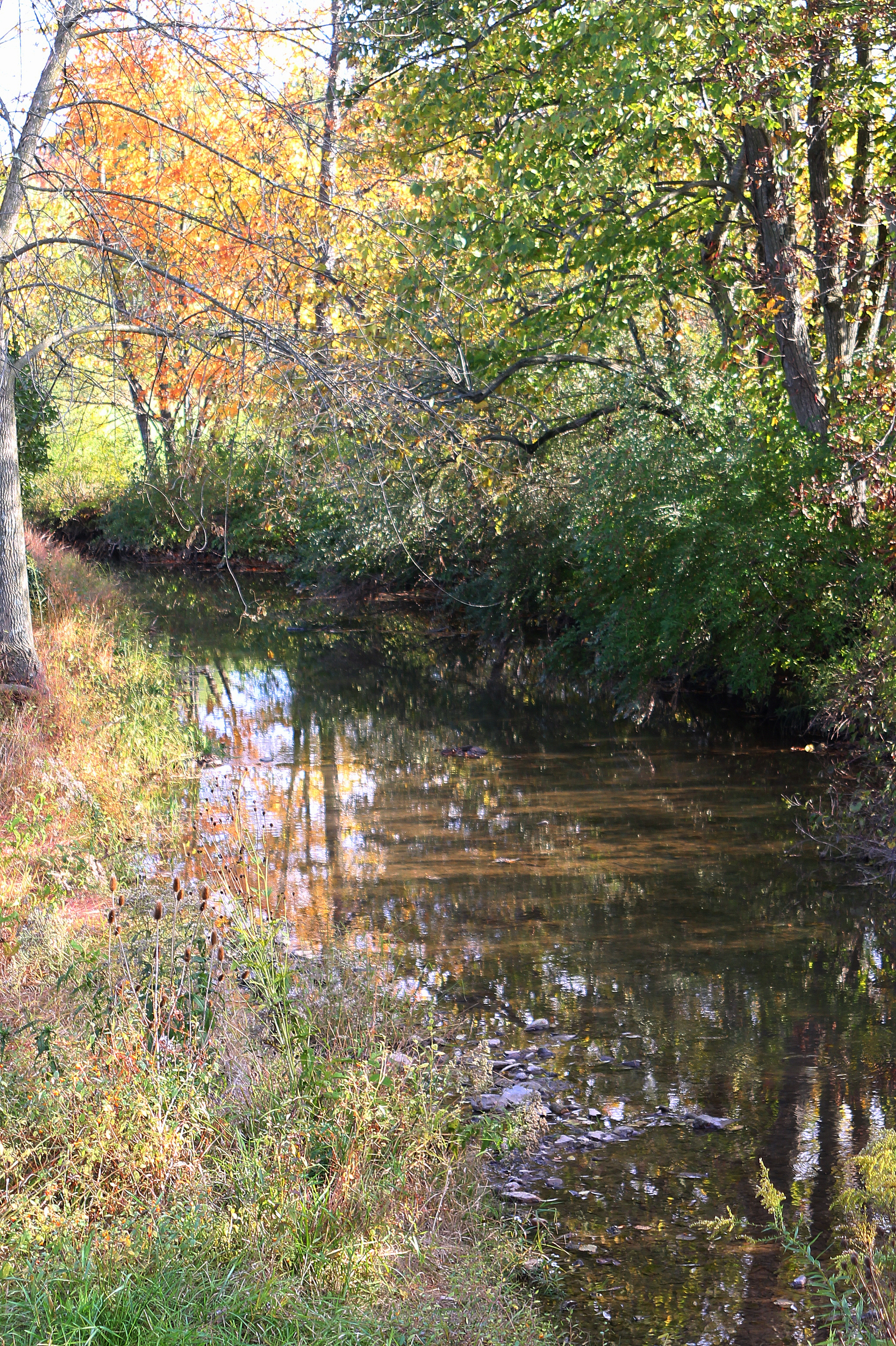
Black Run in its lower reaches

Black Run begins on Buffalo Mountain in West Buffalo Township. It flows southeast for several tenths of a mile, reaching the base of the mountain and entering a valley. Here, it turns east for a few miles, entering Buffalo Township and receiving two unnamed tributaries from the left. The stream eventually turns south-southeast for more than a mile before reaching its confluence with Spruce Run.

Black Run joins Spruce Run 0.80 miles (1.29 km) upstream of its mouth.

== Hydrology, geography and geology ==
The elevation near the mouth of Black Run is 502 feet (153 m) above sea level. The elevation of the stream's source is between 1,520 and 1,540 feet (460 and 470 m) above sea level.

Black Run is not designated as an impaired waterbody.

== Watershed ==
The watershed of Black Run has an area of 4.72 square miles (12.2 km^{2}). The mouth of the stream is in the United States Geological Survey quadrangle of Lewisburg. However, its source is in the quadrangle of Williamsport SE. The stream also passes through the quadrangle of Mifflinburg.

A total of 71 percent of the watershed of Black Run is on forested land. Another 22 percent is on agricultural land and 3 percent is on impervious surfaces, though this may increase to 31 percent in the future.

The watershed of Black Run makes up approximately 3 percent of the Buffalo Creek watershed.

== History ==
Black Run was entered into the Geographic Names Information System on August 2, 1979. Its identifier in the Geographic Names Information System is 1169736. The stream is also known as Black's Run.

A tract of land near Black Run was surveyed by James Wilson in 1771. William Black settled on the stream in 1774. A wagonmaker and farmer named Phillip Stahl settled at the mouth of the stream near Mazeppa in 1793, having moved from Bucks County.

A steel girder and floorbeam system bridge carrying T-389 was built over Black Run 0.8 miles (1.3 km) north of Mazeppa in 1936 and was repaired in 2003. The bridge is County Bridge #7 and is 46.9 feet (14.3 m) long. A concrete tee beam bridge carrying State Route 1002 was built over the stream in 1948. It is 39.0 feet (11.9 m) long and is located in Mazeppa.

== See also ==
- Muddy Run (Spruce Run), next tributary of Spruce run going downstream
- List of rivers of Pennsylvania
