= Little Buffalo Creek =

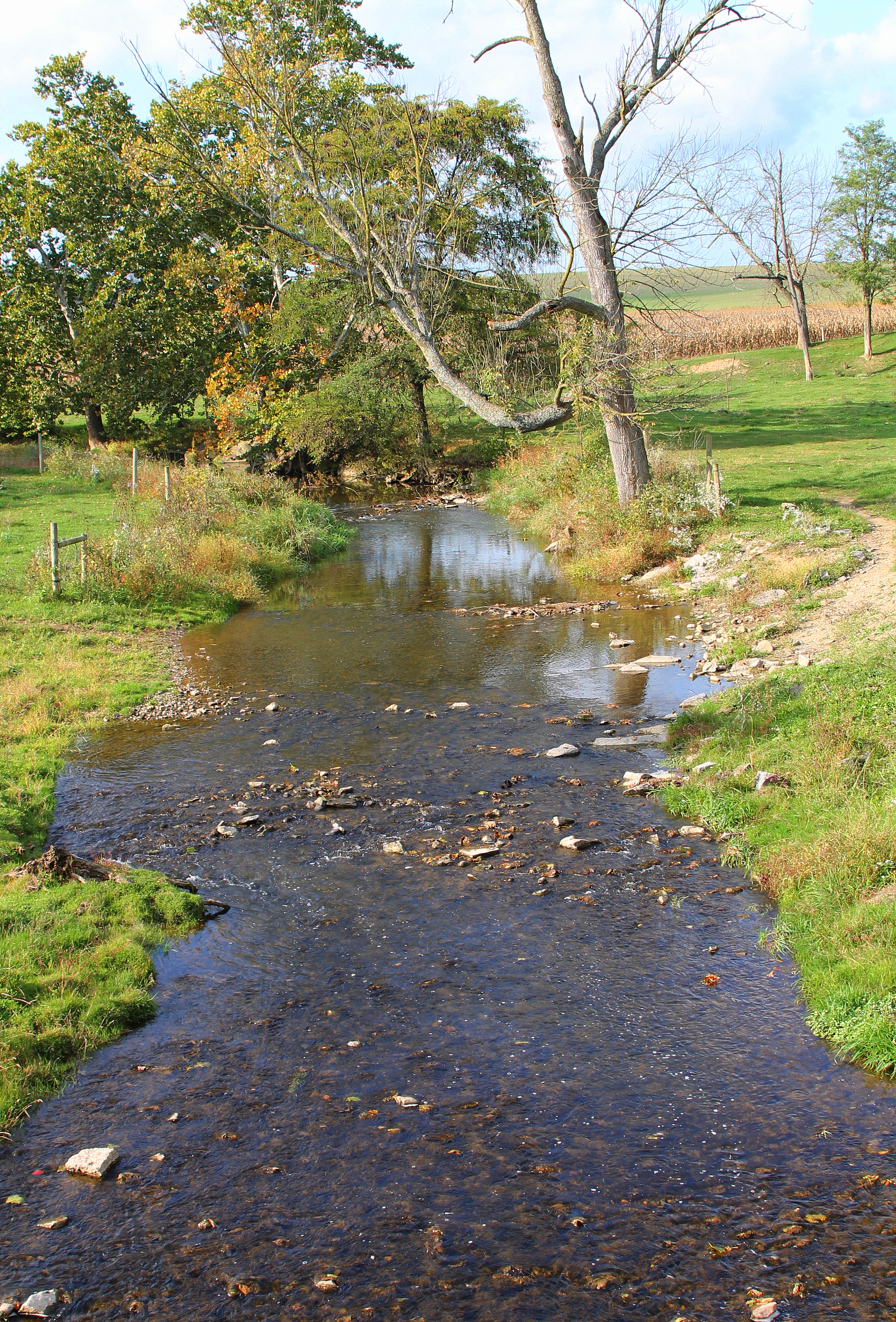
- Little Buffalo Creek looking upstream

Physical characteristics
- Source
  - location: base of a mountain in White Deer Township, Union County, Pennsylvania, United States
  - elevation: between 800 and 820 feet (240 and 250 m)
- Mouth
  - location: Buffalo Creek in Kelly Township, Union County, Pennsylvania, United States
  - coordinates: 40°59′09″N 76°55′41″W
  - elevation: 456 ft (139 m)
- Length: 10 mi (16 km)
- Basin size: 19.0 mi^{2} (49 km^{2})

Basin features
- Progression: Buffalo Creek → West Branch Susquehanna River → Susquehanna River → Chesapeake Bay

Little Buffalo Creek is a tributary of Buffalo Creek in Union County, Pennsylvania, in the United States. It is approximately 10 miles (16 km) long and flows through White Deer Township and Kelly Township. The watershed of the creek has an area of 19.0 square miles (49 km^{2}). The creek is impacted by nutrients, sediment, E. coli, and thermal radiation. Rock formations containing sandstone, shale, and limestone occur in the watershed.

Most of the watershed of Little Buffalo Creek is on forested land or agricultural land, but there are other land uses as well. A number of bridges have been constructed over the creek. In 2014, a $329,851 grant from the Growing Greener program was issued to the Union County Conservation District for agricultural best management practices in its watershed. The creek's drainage basin is designated as a Coldwater Fishery and a Migratory Fishery and wild trout naturally reproduce in a reach of it. American eels have also been released into the creek.

== Course ==
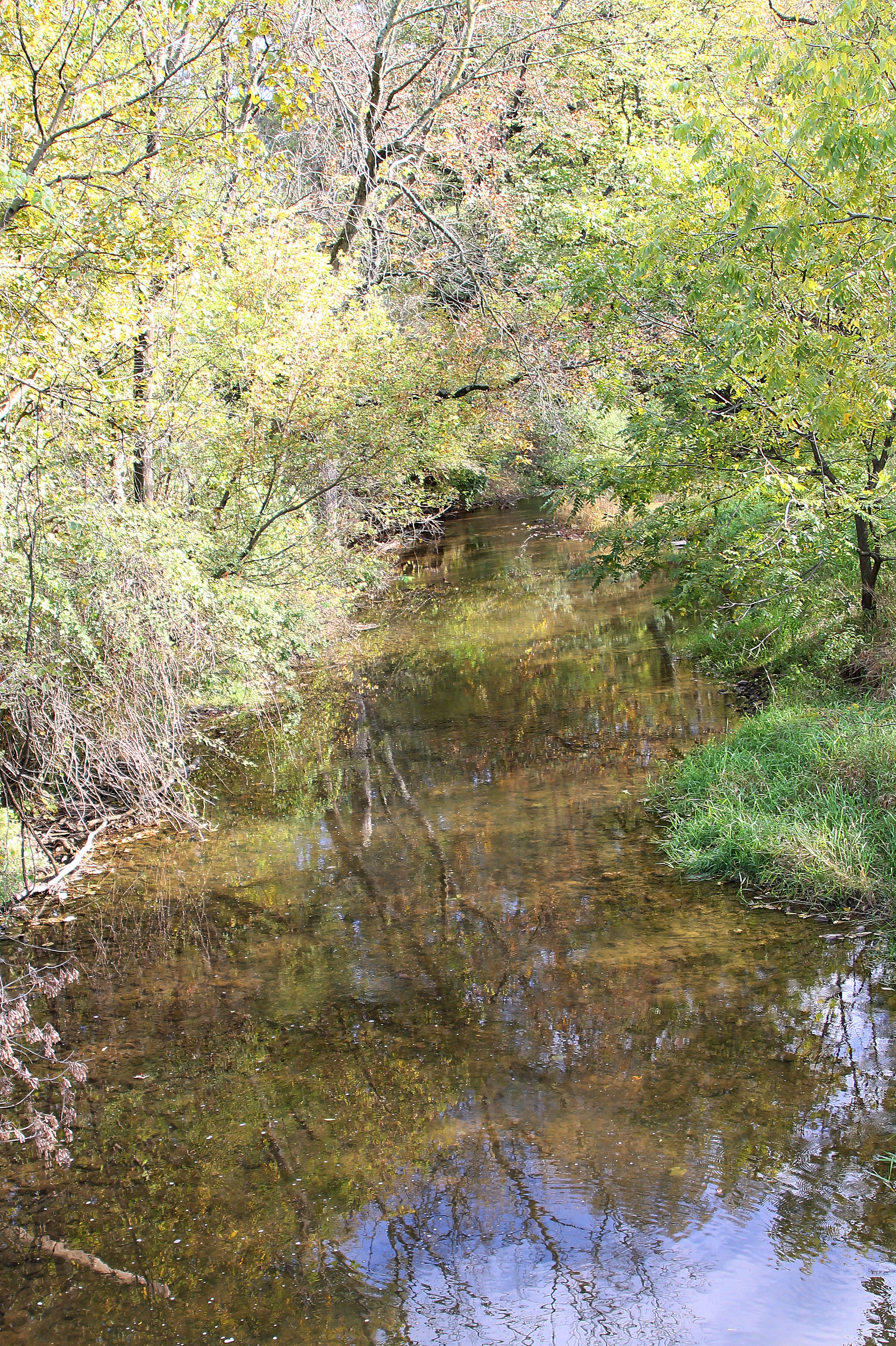
Little Buffalo Creek looking downstream

Little Buffalo Creek begins at the base of a mountain in White Deer Township. It flows south for a short distance before turning east-northeast and then east-southeast. Several tenths of a mile further downstream, the creek turns east-northeast for a few miles before turning south-southeast and entering a valley. After several tenths of a mile, it turns south and enters Kelly Township. The creek continues flowing south for some distance before meandering east for several tenths of a mile. It then turns south again for a few tenths of a mile before turning southwest. The creek then turns south-southeast, then east-northeast, before finally turning southwest. Several tenths of a mile further downstream, it reaches its confluence with Buffalo Creek.

Little Buffalo Creek joins Buffalo Creek 3.30 miles (5.31 km) upstream of its mouth.

== Hydrology ==
Little Buffalo Creek is impacted by nutrients, sediment, E. coli, and thermal radiation.

In 2000, the sediment load in Little Buffalo Creek was 2,565,051 pounds (1,163,488 kg), while in 2008, it was 2,430,940 pounds (1,102,660 kg). This equates to a unit area load of around 200 pounds per acre (220 kg/ha). However, in the future, the sediment load could be reduced by 66.94 percent to 803,723 pounds (364,563 kg) per year. The largest contributors of sediment to the creek in 2000 were streambank erosion (1,259,807 pounds (571,439 kg)) and row crops (962,287 pounds (436,486 kg)). Hay and pastures contributed 127,748 pounds (57,946 kg) and low-density urban land contributed 36,520 pounds (16,570 kg). 178,689 pounds (81,052 kg) came from other sources.

In 2000, the nitrogen load of Little Buffalo Creek was 121,901 pounds (55,293 kg) and in 2008, it was 120,819 pounds (54,803 kg). This equates to a unit area load of just under 10 pounds per acre (11 kg/ha). However, in the future, the annual load could be reduced by 39.11 percent to 2,597 pounds (1,178 kg).

The phosphorus load of Little Buffalo Creek was 4,377 pounds (1,985 kg) in 2000, while in 2008, it was 4,265 pounds (1,935 kg). This equates to a unit area load of less than 0.4 pounds per acre (0.45 kg/ha). However, in the future, the phosphorus load could be reduced by 66.94 percent to 803,723 pounds (364,563 kg) per year.

== Geography and geology ==
The elevation near the mouth of Little Buffalo Creek is 456 feet (139 m) above sea level. The elevation of the creek's source is between 800 and 820 feet (240 and 250 m) above sea level.

There are 0.6 miles (0.97 km) of fencing and 0.0 miles (0 km) of stabilization along streams in the watershed of Little Buffalo Creek. There are also significant flood-prone areas along the creek, which, during a flood, could make access to emergency services in western Kelly Township difficult. There are some floodplain areas along the creek and its tributaries.

Little Buffalo Creek cuts through the Buffalo Mountain Anticlinal. Additionally, the Milton Anticlinal is located near the creek.

Outcroppings of the Ore sandstone are visible at the Buffalo Mountain Anticlinal on Little Buffalo Creek. Shales of the Bloomsburg Formation also occur in the watershed of the creek. Additionally, limestone of the Lower Helderberg Formation occurs near the creek.

== Watershed ==
The watershed of Little Buffalo Creek has an area of 19.0 square miles (49 km^{2}). The mouth of the creek is in the United States Geological Survey quadrangle of Lewisburg. However, the source is in the quadrangle of Williamsport SE. The creek also flows through the quadrangle of Allenwood. It is one of the major tributaries of Buffalo Creek. The watershed makes up 14 percent of the Buffalo Creek drainage basin and is in the northeastern corner of that watershed.

There are 38.7 miles (62.3 km) of streams in the watershed of Little Buffalo Creek. Of these, 14.6 miles (23.5 km) are in agricultural land. Forested land is more common in the watershed's upper reaches, while agricultural land is more common in the lower reaches. The creek does not flow through any protected areas, but its headwaters are not far from state forest lands. There are no major highways in the watershed, but Interstate 80 passes close to its northeastern edge.

A total of 54 percent of the watershed of Little Buffalo Creek is on forested land. Another 37 percent is on agricultural land. Only 3 percent of the watershed is impervious, but this could rise to 26 percent in the future. The watershed contains 2,632 acres (1,065 ha) of row crops and 2,572 acres (1,041 ha) of hay and pastures. A total of 1,049 acres (425 ha) of agricultural land in the watershed is on slopes of more than 3 percent. There are patches of commercial and residential land in the creek's watershed.

There are no unpaved roads in the watershed of Little Buffalo Creek.

== History ==
Little Buffalo Creek was entered into the Geographic Names Information System on August 2, 1979. Its identifier in the Geographic Names Information System is 1179489.

A gristmill and a sawmill were built on Little Buffalo Creek during the winter of 1774 to 1775. The Hubbler Bridge, which is also known as the Lewisburg Penitentiary Bridge, is located on Little Buffalo Creek 2 miles (3.2 km) west of Lewisburg. It is on private property. A bridge built over the creek in 1850 was used as a route for transporting grain to Campbell's Mill.

A bridge carrying T-404 over Little Buffalo Creek was built before 1977. It is 4 miles (6.4 km) west of New Columbia and is 35.1 feet (10.7 m) long. A bridge carrying State Route 1003 was built over the creek 1 mile (1.6 km) north of Kelly Cross Roads in 1934. This bridge is 50.9 feet (15.5 m) long and was repaired in 1983. Another bridge carrying that road was built over the creek 1.5 miles (2.4 km) north of Kelly Cross Roads in 1936 and is 35.1 feet (10.7 m) long. A two-span bridge was built across the creek 2 miles (3.2 km) south of Kelly Cross Roads in 1949, was repaired in 2002, and is 78.9 feet (24.0 m) long. In 1950, a bridge carrying State Route 1004 was constructed over the creek in Kelly Cross Roads and is 58.1 feet (17.7 m) long. In 1951, a bridge carrying State Route 1006 was built over Little Buffalo Creek in 1.5 miles (2.4 km) northeast of Kelly Cross Roads and is 54.1 feet (16.5 m) long.

A bridge with a length of 78.1 feet (23.8 m) was built across Little Buffalo Creek in 1985 and carries State Route 1003 1 mile (1.6 km) west of Kelly Point. A bridge with a length of 61.0 feet (18.6 m) was built over the creek in 1991 and carries T-391 0.9 miles (1.4 km) east of Kelly Point.

In the 2008 report, the watershed of Little Buffalo Creek was ranked fourth amongst several sub-watersheds in the Buffalo Creek drainage basin for restoration priority. In 2014, the a $329,851 grant from the Growing Greener program was issued to the Union County Conservation District for agricultural best management practices in the creek's watershed.

== Biology ==
The drainage basin of Little Buffalo Creek is designated as a Coldwater Fishery and a Migratory Fishery. Wild trout naturally reproduce on a reach of the creek from the T442 bridge downstream to the second State Route 1006 bridge. This reach is 1.99 miles (3.20 km) long. A group of spawning white suckers were observed in the creek in the 1920s.

A population of American eels was released into Little Buffalo Creek in 2013. The eels also carried with them the larvae of freshwater mussels. The aim of the project was to restore American eels and freshwater mussels to the ecosystem of the Susquehanna River.

In a 2008 study, Little Buffalo Creek was found to be less biologically impaired than expected given the amount of agricultural activity and livestock in its watershed. Additionally, some wetlands have been created along the creek by landowners to serve as waterfowl habitats and the Conservation Reserve Enhancement Program of the United States Department of Agriculture has installed riparian buffers on the creek in some formerly agricultural land.

The pathogen load of Little Buffalo Creek is 6.646 × 10^{15} organisms per month. 5.684 × 10^{15} of those organisms come from urban areas, while 9.564 × 10^{14} come from farm animals and 3.214 × 10^{12} come from septic systems. The remaining 2.182 × 10^{12} come from wild animals.

== See also ==
- Spruce Run (Buffalo Creek), next tributary of Buffalo Creek going upstream
- List of rivers of Pennsylvania
