= Stony Run (Buffalo Creek tributary) =

River in the United States of America

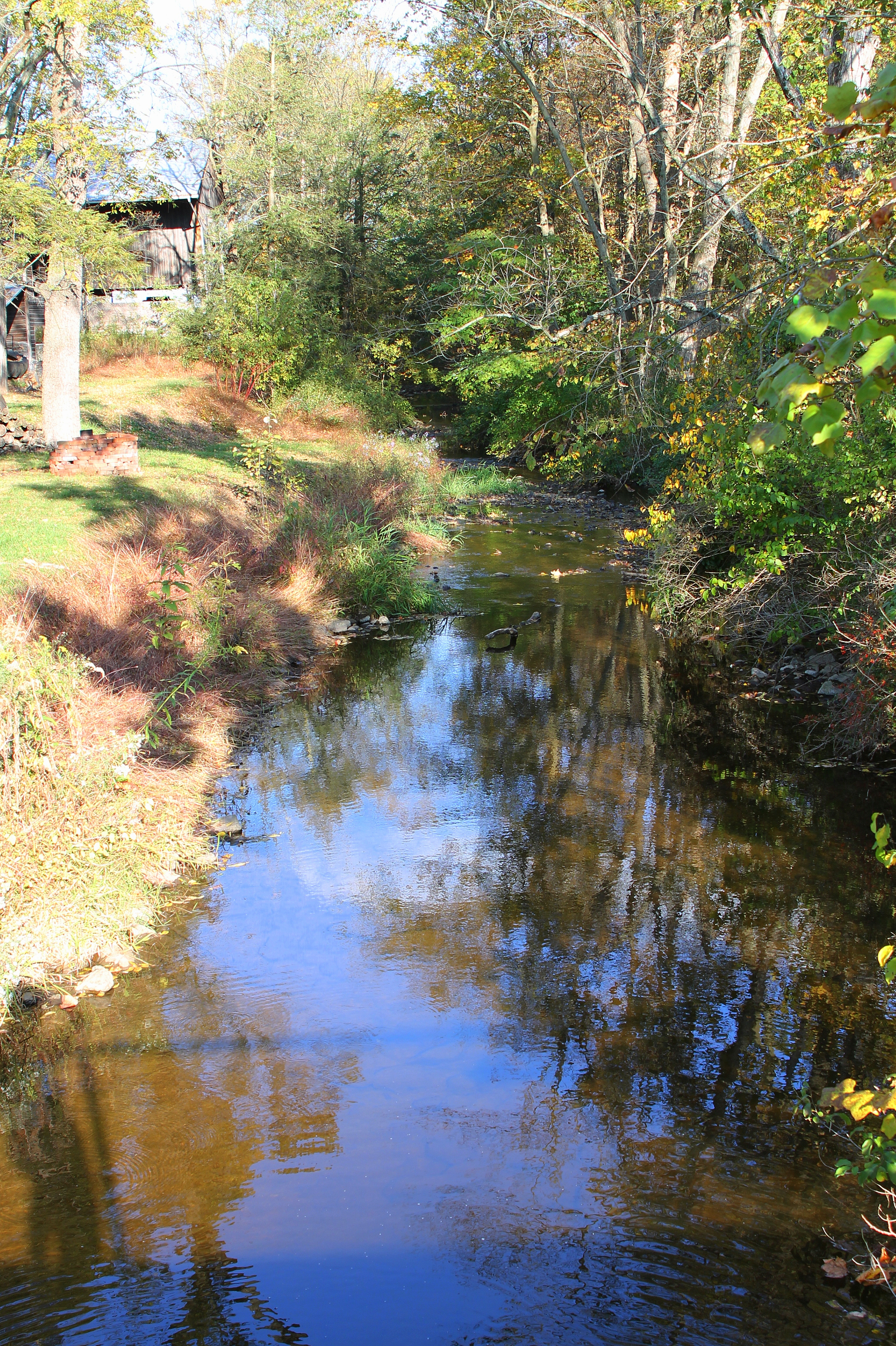
- Stony Run looking downstream

Physical characteristics
- Source
  - location: valley in West Buffalo Township, Union County, Pennsylvania
  - elevation: between 680 and 700 feet (210 and 210 m)
- Mouth
  - location: Buffalo Creek in Buffalo Township, Union County, Pennsylvania
  - coordinates: 40°57′41″N 77°00′11″W
  - elevation: 505 ft (154 m)
- Length: 3.3 mi (5.3 km)
- Basin size: 1.46 sq mi (3.8 km^{2})

Basin features
- Progression: Buffalo Creek → West Branch Susquehanna River → Susquehanna River → Chesapeake Bay
- Tributaries
  - left: one unnamed tributary

Stony Run is a tributary of Buffalo Creek in Union County, Pennsylvania, in the United States. It is approximately 3.3 miles (5.3 km) long and flows through West Buffalo Township and Buffalo Township. The watershed of the stream has an area of 1.46 square miles (3.8 km^{2}). The stream is impacted by nutrient pollution, sediment, E. coli, and thermal radiation. The watershed mostly consists of forested land and agricultural land. It is designated as a High-Quality Coldwater Fishery and a Migratory Fishery. The stream also has a healthy population of benthic macroinvertebrates.

== Course ==
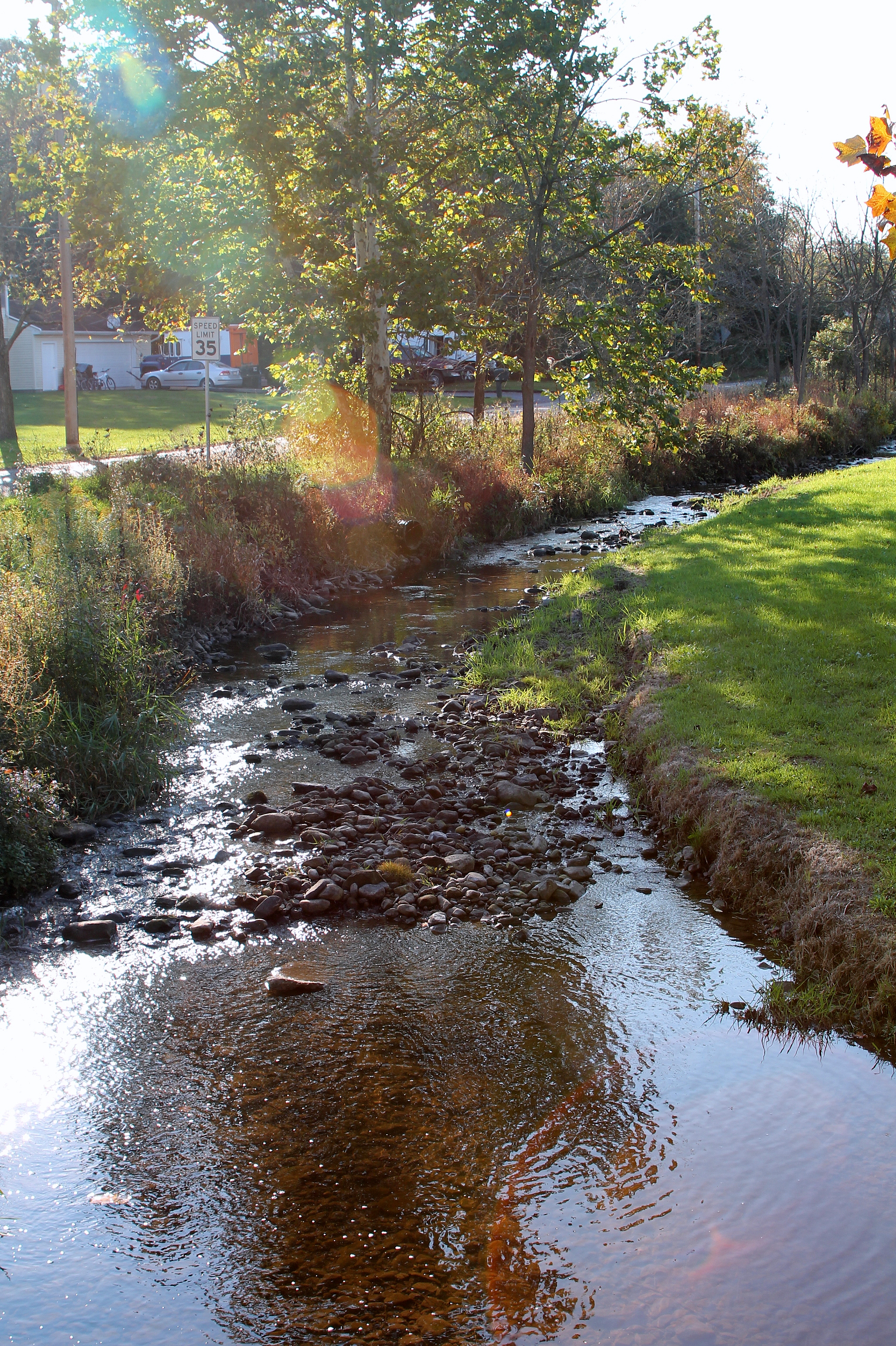
Stony Run looking upstream

Stony Run begins in West Buffalo Township. It flows east-southeast through a broad valley that it shares with Rapid Run. After more than a mile, the stream enters Buffalo Township. Here, it turns southeast for several tenths of a mile before receiving an unnamed tributary from the left. It then turns southwest for several hundred feet before turning east-southeast again. After several tenths of a mile, it turns southeast and a few tenths of a mile after that, it reaches its confluence with Buffalo Creek.

Stony Run joins Buffalo Creek 9.68 miles (15.58 km) upstream of its mouth.

== Hydrology ==
Stony Run is impacted by nutrient pollution, sediment, E. coli, and thermal radiation.

In 2000, the sediment load of Stony Run was 89,897 pounds (40,777 kg), while in 2008, it was 83,827 pounds (38,023 kg). This equates to less than 100 pounds per acre (110 kg/ha). However, the annual sediment load could in the future be reduced by 68.43 percent to 26,467 pounds (12,005 kg). In 2000, row crops and streambank erosion contributed 46,974 and 33,173 pounds (21,307 and 15,047 kg) of sediment, respectively. A total of 4,438 pounds (2,013 kg) came from hay and pastures, 2,710 pounds (1,230 kg) came from low-density urban land, and 2,602 pounds (1,180 kg) came from other sources.

In 2000, the load of nitrogen in Stony Run was 8,325 pounds (3,776 kg) and in 2008 it was 8,231 pounds (3,734 kg). This equates to between 5 and 10 pounds per acre (5.6 and 11.2 kg/ha). The annual load of nitrogen could be reduced by as much as 36.17 percent to 3,254 pounds (1,476 kg). In 2000, 2,131 pounds (967 kg) of nitrogen came from groundwater/subsurface water. Another 483 pounds (219 kg) came from row crops and 224 pounds (102 kg) came from hay and pastures. 27 pounds (12 kg) came from low-density urban land, 15 pounds (6.8 kg) came from septic systems, 2 pounds (0.91 kg) came from streambank erosion, and 79 pounds (36 kg) came from other sources.

The phosphorus load of Stony Run in 2000 was 378 pounds (171 kg) and in 2008, it was 370 pounds (170 kg). This equates to about 0.4 pounds per acre (0.45 kg/ha). However, the phosphorus load could be reduced by 46.22 percent to 199 pounds (90 kg) per year. In 2000, row crops contributed 64 pounds (29 kg) of phosphorus to the stream, while groundwater/subsurface water contributed 53 pounds (24 kg) and hay and pastures contributed 22 pounds (10.0 kg). A total of 4 pounds (1.8 kg) came from low-density urban land, 2 pounds (0.91 kg) came from septic systems, 1 pound (0.45 kg) came from streambank erosion, and 4 pounds (1.8 kg) came from miscellaneous sources.

== Geography and geology ==
The elevation near the mouth of Stony Run is 505 feet (154 m) above sea level. The elevation of the stream's source is between 680 and 700 feet (210 and 210 m) above sea level.

There are no fences along any streams in the watershed of Stony Run. However, there could eventually be 1.0 mile (1.6 km) of fences. No stream reach in the watershed has stabilization, but up to 4.0 miles (6.4 km) could potentially be stabilized. Forest Hill is located near the headwaters of Stony Run.

A debris fan from the late Pleistocene occurs in the vicinity of Stony Run.

== Watershed ==
The watershed of Stony Run has an area of 1.46 square miles (3.8 km^{2}). The stream is entirely within the United States Geological Survey quadrangle of Mifflinburg. There are a total of 4.0 miles (6.4 km) of streams within the watershed. Of these, 1.0 mile (1.6 km) are on agricultural land. The mouth of the stream is near Cowan.

A total of 61 percent of the watershed of Stony Run is on forested land. Another 32 percent is on agricultural land and 3 percent is on impervious surfaces. The area of land on impervious surfaces could potentially rise to 30 percent. The agricultural land in the watershed includes 195 acres (79 ha) of row crops and 143 acres (58 ha) of hay and pastures.

None of the agricultural land in the watershed of Stony Run is on slopes of more than 3 percent. There are no unpaved roads in the stream's watershed.

The watershed of Stony Run makes up 1 percent of the Buffalo Creek drainage basin.

== History ==
Stony Run was entered into the Geographic Names Information System on August 2, 1979. Its identifier in the Geographic Names Information System is 1188794.

The John Umstead tract, which was located along Stony Run, was surveyed by Thomas Sutherland on May 17, 1770.

In a 2008 report, the watershed of Stony Run was ranked tenth amongst sub-watersheds in the Buffalo Creek drainage basin for restoration priority.

== Biology ==
The drainage basin of Stony Run is designated as a High-Quality Coldwater Fishery and a Migratory Fishery. The stream has a population of benthic macroinvertebrates that has been described as "healthy".

There are 0.2 miles (0.32 km) of vegetated riparian buffers along streams in the watershed of Stony Run.

The pathogen load in Stony Run is on the order of 6.842 × 10^{15} organisms per month. The largest contributor of pathogens is urban areas (6.738 × 10^{15} organisms per month). Farm animals contribute 1.034 × 10^{14} organisms per month, septic systems contribute 3.287 × 10^{11} organisms per month, and wildlife contributes 1.745 × 10^{11} organisms per month. The pathogen load could in the future be reduced by 1.16 percent to 6.762 × 10^{15} organisms per month.

== See also ==
- Beaver Run (Buffalo Creek), next tributary of Buffalo Creek going downstream
- Rapid Run (Buffalo Creek), next tributary of Buffalo Creek going upstream
- List of rivers of Pennsylvania
