= Spruce Run (Buffalo Creek tributary) =

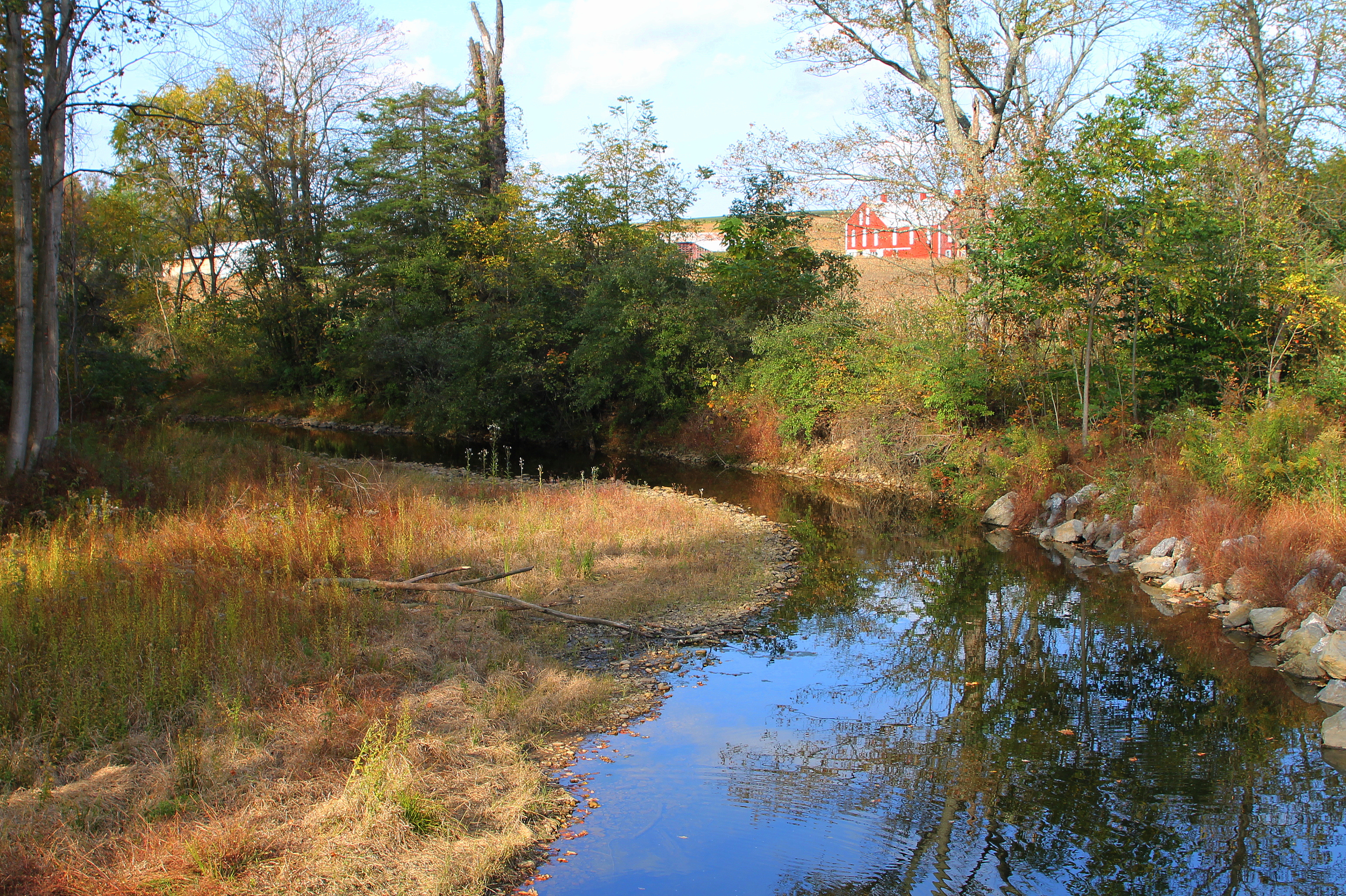
- Spruce Run looking upstream

Physical characteristics
- Source
  - location: narrow valley in eastern Hartley Township, Union County, Pennsylvania
  - elevation: between 1,760 and 1,780 feet (536 and 543 m)
- Mouth
  - location: Buffalo Creek on the border between Buffalo Township, Union County, Pennsylvania and Kelly Township, Union County, Pennsylvania
  - coordinates: 40°58′38″N 76°58′43″W
  - elevation: 482 ft (147 m)
- Length: 14 mi (23 km)
- Basin size: 27.2 sq mi (70 km^{2})

Basin features
- Progression: Buffalo Creek → West Branch Susquehanna River → Susquehanna River → Chesapeake Bay
- Tributaries
  - right: Black Run, Muddy Run

Spruce Run is a tributary of Buffalo Creek in Union County, Pennsylvania, in the United States. It is approximately 14 miles (23 km) long and flows through Hartley Township, Lewis Township, West Buffalo Township, White Deer Township, Buffalo Township, and Kelly Township. The watershed of the stream has an area of 27.2 square miles (70 km^{2}). The stream has two named tributaries: Black Run and Muddy Run. It is not designated as an impaired waterbody, but it is affected by sediment and nutrients.

Spruce Run mainly flows through mountainous terrain and the Spruce Run Reservoir is in its watershed. The watershed of its main stem is mostly forested. There used to be a mill near the stream's mouth and lumbering was done in the surrounding area. A number of bridges have been constructed across it. Part of the stream is designated as Exceptional Value waters and a Migratory Fishery, while the other part is a High-Quality Coldwater Fishery and a Migratory Fishery. The stream has been described as an "excellent" site for angling.

== Course ==
Spruce Run begins in a narrow valley in eastern Hartley Township. It flows east-northeast for a few miles, heading along the northern side of Sand Mountain and entering Lewis Township. The stream then turns north for several tenths of a mile and passes by Round Knob before turning east-northeast for several more miles. In this reach, the stream passes near Round Knob, Long Knob, Buffalo Mountain, and Catahannes Crown, while exiting Lewis Township and passing through West Buffalo Township. It eventually turns east and begins flowing along the border between Buffalo Township and White Deer Township. In this reach, it passes by the Spruce Run Reservoir. The stream then turns south-southwest for a few miles as its valley becomes much shallower. It begins flowing along the border between Buffalo Township and Kelly Township, where it receives Black Run, its first named tributary, from the right. Several tenths of a mile after this, it turns southeast and receives Muddy Run, its second and final named tributary, from the right. A few tenths of a mile further downstream, the stream reaches its confluence with Buffalo Creek.

Spruce Run joins Buffalo Creek 7.70 miles (12.39 km) upstream of its mouth.

== Hydrology ==
Spruce Run is not designated as an impaired waterbody. Even though the nearby Buffalo Creek headwaters, which are just across a mountain from Spruce Run, are affected by acid deposition, Spruce Run itself is not affected by it. However, it is still impacted by nutrient pollution and sediment.

The sediment load of Spruce Run and its tributary Black Run was 2,065,843 pounds (937,051 kg) in 2000 and 2,021,053 pounds (916,734 kg) in 2008. In the future, in could be reduced by as much as 42.30 percent to 1,166,137 pounds (528,951 kg) per year. The nitrogen load in the two streams was 79,278 pounds (35,960 kg) and 78,608 pounds (35,656 kg) in 2000 and 2008, respectively. In the future, the nitrogen load could be reduced by 13.36 percent to 68,105 pounds (30,892 kg) per year. The phosphorus load was 2,998 pounds (1,360 kg) in 2000 and 2,939 pounds (1,333 kg) in 2008. In the future, it could be reduced by as much as 24.36 percent, to 2,223 pounds (1,008 kg) per year.

== Geography and geology ==
The elevation near the mouth of Spruce Run is 482 feet (147 m) above sea level. The elevation of the stream's source is between 1,760 and 1,780 feet (536 and 543 m) above sea level.

Jökulhlaup surfaces and former ice-dammed lakes exist in the vicinity of Spruce Run. Patches of debris fans and till also occur nearby. The approximate area of the ice-dammed lake was estimated to be about 3.4 square kilometers (1.3 sq mi), the depth was 70 meters (230 ft), and the volume was 0.27 cubic kilometers (9.5×10^{9} cu ft).

The upper reaches of Spruce Run flow through mountainous terrain. Buffalo Mountain and Nittany Mountain are in its vicinity. The stream flows between these two mountains.

== Watershed ==
The watershed of Spruce Run has an area of 27.2 square miles (70 km^{2}). The mouth of the stream is in the United States Geological Survey quadrangle of Lewisburg. However, the source is in the quadrangle of Carroll. The stream also passes through the quadrangles of Allenwood and Williamsport SE. It is one of the largest tributaries of Buffalo Creek. The main stem of the stream makes up 13 percent of the Buffalo Creek drainage basin.

Discounting the sub-watersheds of Muddy Run and Black Run, a total of 88 percent of the watershed of Spruce Run is on forested land. Another 9 percent is on agricultural land and 2 percent is on impervious surfaces, though this may rise to 7 percent in the future.

Spruce Run is used as a public drinking water supply for Lewisburg. A reservoir known as the Spruce Run Reservoir, which is operated by the Pennsylvania American Water Company, is on the stream. The watershed's upper reaches are in a state forest. The stream's mouth is near Cameron.

Upstream of the Spruce Run Reservoir, Spruce Run can be accessed from Spruce Run Road.

== History ==
Spruce Run was entered into the Geographic Names Information System on August 2, 1979. Its identifier in the Geographic Names Information System is 1188354. The stream has had its name since at least June 11, 1769, when Colonel Kelly filed an application for land nearby.

Barney Parsons, one of the early settlers in the area, had reached Spruce Run by the fall of 1769. Retchler's Mill historically existed near the mouth of Spruce Run. A village known as Union eventually developed in this area. The village's name was later changed to Boyertown, and then Mazeppa, the name by which it is currently known.

Monroe H. Culp once constructed a 36 inches (91 cm) gauge railroad line from into the watershed of Spruce Run, passing near where the Spruce Run Reservoir is currently located. The railroad was known as the Lewisburg and Buffalo Valley Railroad. Some timbering for charcoal was historically done in the mountains in the vicinity of the stream. In around 1900, the Kulp Lumber Mill at Linntown processed millions of board feet of timber from the stream's watershed. The Sugar Valley Railroad was incorporated on October 19, 1900 and part of it was located at Running Gap, near the stream.

A concrete tee beam bridge carrying State Route 1001 was built over Spruce Run in 1921 and repaired in 1947. It is 32.2 feet (9.8 m) long and is situated 2.5 miles (4.0 km) west of Kelly Crossroads. A bridge of the same type, but carrying T-428, was built in 1925. It situated 2.7 miles (4.3 km) north of Mazeppa and is 32.2 feet (9.8 m) long. A steel stringer/multi-beam or girder bridge carrying State Route 1001 was constructed across the stream in 1947. It is 35.1 feet (10.7 m) long and is situated 2.5 miles (4.0 km) west of Kelly Crossroads. A bridge of the same type carrying, but carrying State Route 1002, was constructed across the stream in 1948. It is 70.9 feet (21.6 m) long and is situated 1 mile (1.6 km) west of Mazeppa.

== Biology ==
From its source to the eastern boundary of Bald Eagle State Forest, the drainage basin of Spruce Run is designated as Exceptional Value and a Migratory Fishery. From this point downstream to its mouth, the drainage basin is designated as a High-Quality Coldwater Fishery and a Migratory Fishery. Wild trout naturally reproduce in the stream from its headwaters downstream to the tributary Black Run, a distance of 12.24 miles (19.70 km).

There are no known species of special concern inhabiting Spruce Run in Buffalo Township and Kelly Township. Acadian Flycatchers have been observed in the vicinity of the stream on Buffalo Mountain. Black-throated blue warblers have also been observed near the stream.

A reach of Spruce Run with a length of 6.5 miles (10.5 km) was stocked with fish in the past. For a time it was only stocked in the preseason, but in-season stocking began in 1990.

== Recreation ==
There are "excellent" angling opportunities on Spruce Run. The stream is designated as Approved Trout Waters. In 2014, 100 acres (40 ha) of land in the stream's vicinity was purchased for state forest land for $356,000. A hiking trail known as the Bear Gap Trail is located near the stream.

== See also ==
- Little Buffalo Creek, next tributary of Buffalo Creek going downstream
- Beaver Run (Buffalo Creek), next tributary of Buffalo Creek going upstream
- List of rivers of Pennsylvania
