= Beaver Run (Buffalo Creek tributary) =

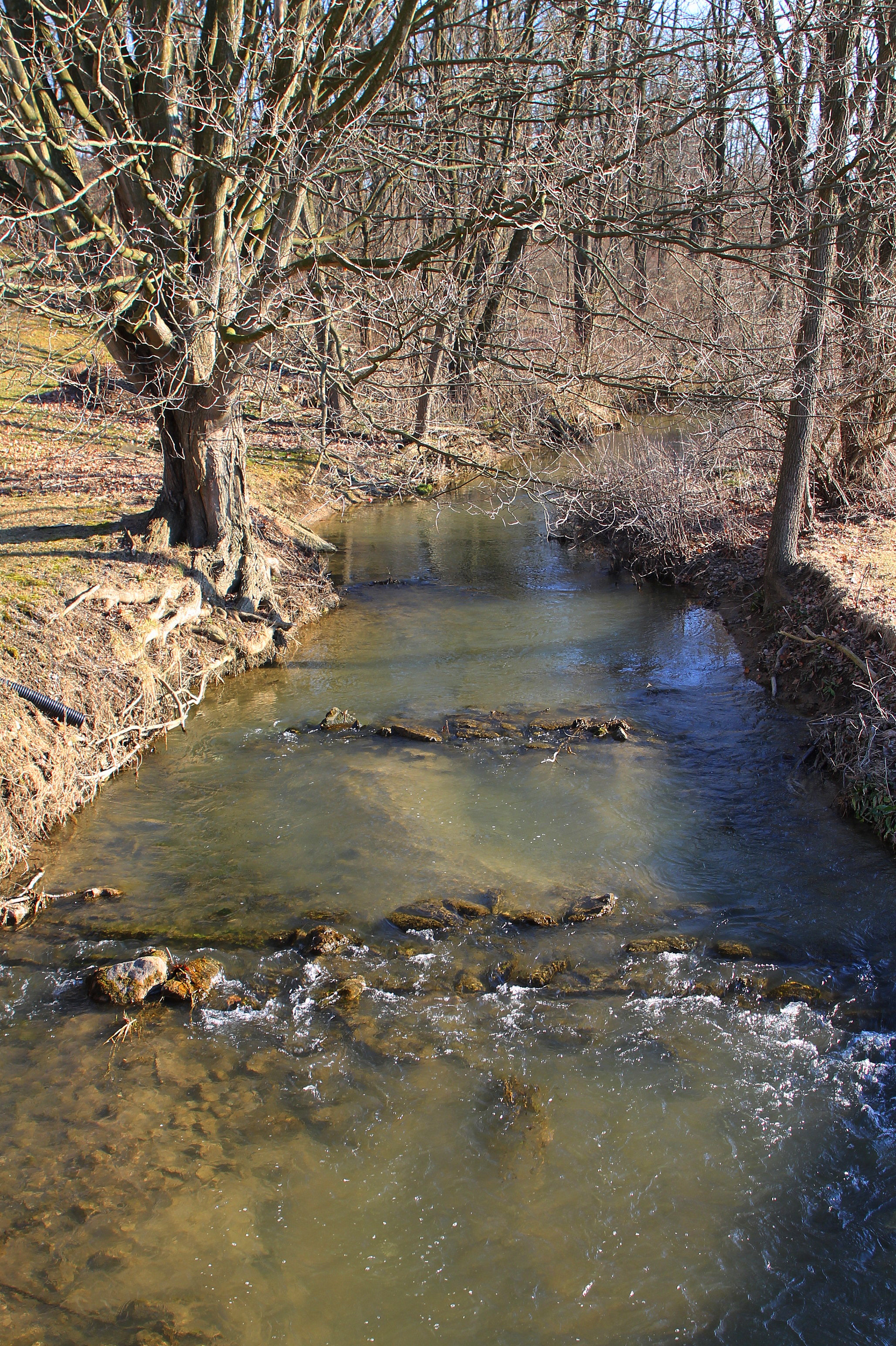
- Beaver Run looking upstream from Pennsylvania Route 192
- Etymology: a large beaver dam historically located near its mouth

Physical characteristics
- Source
  - location: near the intersection of Pheasant Ridge Road and Dreisbach Church Road in Buffalo Township, Union County, Pennsylvania
  - elevation: between 540 and 560 feet (160 and 170 m)
- Mouth
  - location: Buffalo Creek in Buffalo Township, Union County, Pennsylvania
  - coordinates: 40°57′59″N 76°59′05″W
  - elevation: 492 ft (150 m)
- Length: 3.7 mi (6.0 km)
- Basin size: 4.78 mi^{2} (12.4 km^{2})

Basin features
- Progression: Buffalo Creek → West Branch Susquehanna River → Susquehanna River → Chesapeake Bay

Beaver Run is a tributary of Buffalo Creek in Union County, Pennsylvania, in the United States. It is approximately 3.7 miles (6.0 km) long and flows through Buffalo Township. The watershed of the stream has an area of 4.78 square miles (12.4 km^{2}). It is designated as an impaired stream due to siltation from agricultural activity. A significant majority of the stream's watershed is on agricultural land and only a tiny minority is on forested land.

Beaver Run was named sometime before 1769. A bridge was constructed over the stream in Vicksburg in 1940. The watershed of Beaver Run is designated as a coldwater fishery and a migratory fishery. The stream has a low level of diversity amongst pollution-sensitive macroinvertebrates. However, its pathogen load is several quadrillion organisms per month.

== Course ==
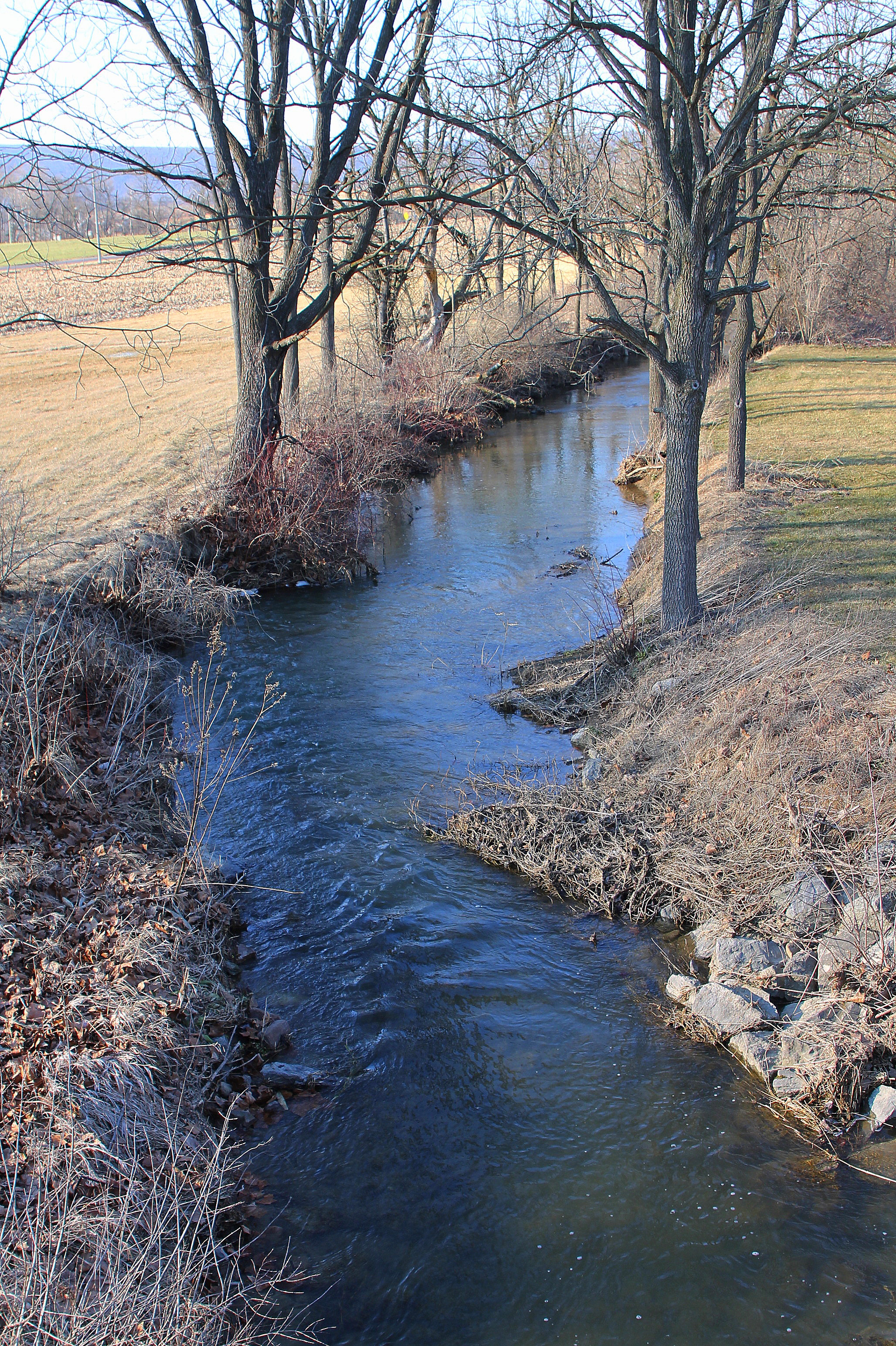
Beaver Run looking downstream from Pennsylvania Route 192

Beaver Run begins near the intersection of Pheasant Ridge Road and Dreisbach Church Road in Buffalo Township. It flows north-northeast for a short distance before turning north-northwest for a few tenths of a mile. The stream then turns west-northwest for several tenths of a mile before turning west and entering Vicksburg. Here, it turns north-northwest again and crosses Pennsylvania Route 45 before turning northeast and leaving Vicksburg. The stream then turns north for more than a mile and flows through a shallow valley before crossing Pennsylvania Route 192 and reaching its confluence with Buffalo Creek.

Beaver Run joins Buffalo Creek 8.60 miles (13.84 km) upstream of its mouth.

=== Tributaries ===
Beaver Run has no named tributaries. However, it does have a number of unnamed tributaries. Their stream codes are 18995, 18996, 18997, and 64983. All are designated as impaired by siltation due to agriculture.

== Hydrology ==
Beaver Run is as degraded as some impaired tributaries of Buffalo Creek. However, Beaver Run was not designated by the Pennsylvania Department of Environmental Protection as an impaired waterbody until 2008. A total of 7.8 miles (12.6 km) of the stream and its tributaries are impaired. Despite this, it is not a major contributor of degradation to the main stem of Buffalo Creek, due to its low discharge. The cause of the impairment is siltation and the source is agriculture. The total maximum daily load date is 2021.

The load of sediment in Beaver Run in 2000 was 1,360,397 pounds (617,066 kg), while in 2008, the load was 1,349,807 pounds (612,262 kg). This equates to nearly 450 pounds per acre (500 kg/ha), the highest of any major tributary of Buffalo Creek. However, in the future, it could decrease by as much as 67.28 percent, to 441,599 pounds (200,306 kg) per year. In 2000, row crops and streambank erosion were the largest sources of sediment in the stream, comprising 1,066,189 and 197,654 pounds (483,615 and 89,654 kg) of the annual load, respectively. Other sources included hay/pastures (46,374 pounds (21,035 kg)), low-density urban land (23,408 pounds (10,618 kg)), unpaved roads (3,192 pounds (1,448 kg)), and miscellaneous sources (23,580 pounds (10,700 kg)).

Beaver Run has high levels of nitrogen. In 2000, the nitrogen load was 98,545 pounds (44,699 kg) and in 2008, it was 97,345 pounds (44,155 kg). This equates to more than 30 pounds per acre (34 kg/ha), again the highest of any major tributary of Buffalo Creek. However, in the future, the nitrogen load could decrease by up to 39.44 percent, to 58,951 pounds (26,740 kg). In 2000, 24,427 pounds (11,080 kg) of nitrogen came from groundwater and subsurface water, 6,931 pounds (3,144 kg) came from row crops, and 1,006 pounds (456 kg) came from hay and pastures. Another 121 pounds (55 kg) came from low-density urban land, while 52 pounds (24 kg) came from septic systems, 22 pounds (10.0 kg) came from unpaved roads, and 10 pounds (4.5 kg) came from streambank erosion. Another 148 pounds (67 kg) came from other sources.

The phosphorus load in Beaver Run was 4,651 pounds (2,110 kg) in 2000 and 4,537 pounds (2,058 kg) in 2008. This equates to about 1.5 pounds per acre (1.7 kg/ha), the highest of any major tributary to Buffalo Creek. The phosphorus load could potentially be reduced by as much as 53.25 percent, to 2,121 pounds (962 kg). In 2000, 1,150 pounds (520 kg) of phosphorus came from row crops. Other sources included groundwater and subsurface water (276 pounds (125 kg)), hay and pastures (112 pounds (51 kg)), and low-density urban land (20 pounds (9.1 kg)). 6 and 4 pounds (2.7 and 1.8 kg) came from septic systems and streambank erosion, while 3 pounds (1.4 kg) came from unpaved roads and 19 pounds (8.6 kg) came from miscellaneous sources.

== Geography, geology, and climate ==
The elevation near the mouth of Beaver Run is 492 feet (150 m) above sea level. The elevation of the creek's source is between 540 and 560 feet (160 and 170 m) above sea level. The stream's watershed is entirely within the Appalachian Mountain section of the ridge and valley physiographic province.

There are no fences along any part of Beaver Run or any of its tributaries. Additionally, there is only 0.1 miles (0.16 km) of stabilization along streams in its watershed. However, 6.1 miles (9.8 km) of fencing and 7.3 miles (11.7 km) of stabilization could potentially be installed.

The main rock formations in the watershed of Beaver Run include the Wills Creek Formation and the Keyser and Tonoloway Formation. Each formation occupies 50 percent of the watershed. The former rock formation is dominant in the lower reaches, while the latter one is dominant in the upper reaches.

The most common soil type in the watershed of Beaver Run is the Edom-Millheim-Calvin soil, which occupies 70 percent of the watershed. The Hagerstown-Duffield-Clarksburg soil occupies 25 percent of the watershed and the Chenango-Pope-Holly soil occupies 5 percent. The Chenango-Pope-Holly soil occurs mainly in the watershed's lower reaches, while the Edom-Millheim-Calvin soil occurs in the middle reaches and the Hagerstown-Duffield-Clarksburg soil occurs in the upper reaches.

The average annual rate of precipitation in the watershed of Beaver Run is 44.5 inches (113 cm). The average rate of runoff in the watershed is 0.35 inches (0.89 cm) per year.

== Watershed ==
The watershed of Beaver Run has an area of 4.78 square miles (12.4 km^{2}). The stream is entirely within the United States Geological Survey quadrangle of Lewisburg. It is one of the major tributaries of Buffalo Creek. The watershed makes up approximately 3 percent of the watershed of Buffalo Creek.

There are 7.3 miles (11.7 km) of streams in the watershed of Beaver Run. Of these 6.2 miles (10.0 km) are in agricultural land.

A total of 6 percent of the watershed of Beaver Run is on forested land. Another 83 percent of the watershed is on agricultural land, while 7 percent is on impervious surfaces. There is virtually no forested land in the watershed. The total amount of impervious land in the watershed could potentially rise to 41 percent in the future. A total of 2,019 acres (817 ha) of land in the watershed is devoted to row crops. Another 630 acres (250 ha) are devoted to hay and pastures. The watershed contains 281.70 acres (114.00 ha) of low-intensity development, 12.40 acres (5.02 ha) of transitional land, and 9.90 acres (4.01 ha) of wetlands.

A total of 325 acres (132 ha) of land in the watershed of Beaver Run is on slopes of greater than 3 percent. There are 0.9 miles (1.4 km) of unpaved roads in the watershed and they occupy an area of 2.50 acres (1.01 ha).

== History and etymology ==
Beaver Run was entered into the Geographic Names Information System on August 2, 1979. Its identifier in the Geographic Names Information System is 1169027. The stream received its name sometime before 1769. It is named after a large beaver dam that was located near its mouth.

A concrete tee beam bridge carrying Pennsylvania Route 45 was constructed across Beaver Run in 1940. It is 26.9 feet (8.2 m) long and is located in Vicksburg.

In the original assessment of Beaver Run by the Pennsylvania Department of Environmental Protection, the stream was not found to be impaired. However, in September 2006, the Buffalo Creek Watershed Association petitioned the Pennsylvania Department of Environmental Protection to classify the stream as impaired, as chemical and biological signs indicated a lower level of water quality than the Pennsylvania Department of Environmental Protection's assessments had originally indicated. The stream was listed as impaired in 2008.

In a 2008 report, the watershed of Beaver Run was ranked second amongst sub-watersheds in the Buffalo Creek drainage basin for restoration priority.

== Biology ==
The drainage basin of Beaver Run is designated as a coldwater fishery and a migratory fishery. Beaver Run has a low level of biodiversity among pollution-sensitive macroinvertebrates.

Only 0.7 miles (1.1 km) of streams in the watershed of Beaver Run have a vegetated riparian buffer. However, this could potentially increase to 6.1 miles (9.8 km).

The pathogen load of Beaver Run is on the order of 7.887 × 10^{15} organisms per month. Urban land and farm animals are the largest source of pathogens, at 6.497 × 10^{15} and 1.389 × 10^{15} organisms per month, respectively. The remaining sources are orders of magnitude smaller. They include septic systems (1.224 × 10^{12} organisms per month) and wildlife (4.672 × 10^{10} organisms per month).

== See also ==
- Spruce Run (Buffalo Creek), next tributary of Buffalo Creek going downstream
- Stony Run (Buffalo Creek), next tributary of Buffalo Creek going upstream
- List of rivers of Pennsylvania
