= Slifer =

Slifer may refer to:

- Slifer the Sky Dragon, the English-language name of a card in the Yu-Gi-Oh! Trading Card Game
- Slifer House, house in Pennsylvania, United States

== People with the surname ==
- Clarence Slifer (1912–1993), American special effects artist
- Roger Slifer (1954–2015), American comic book writer
