= Buffalo Creek (West Branch Susquehanna River tributary) =

Creek in Union County, Pennsylvania

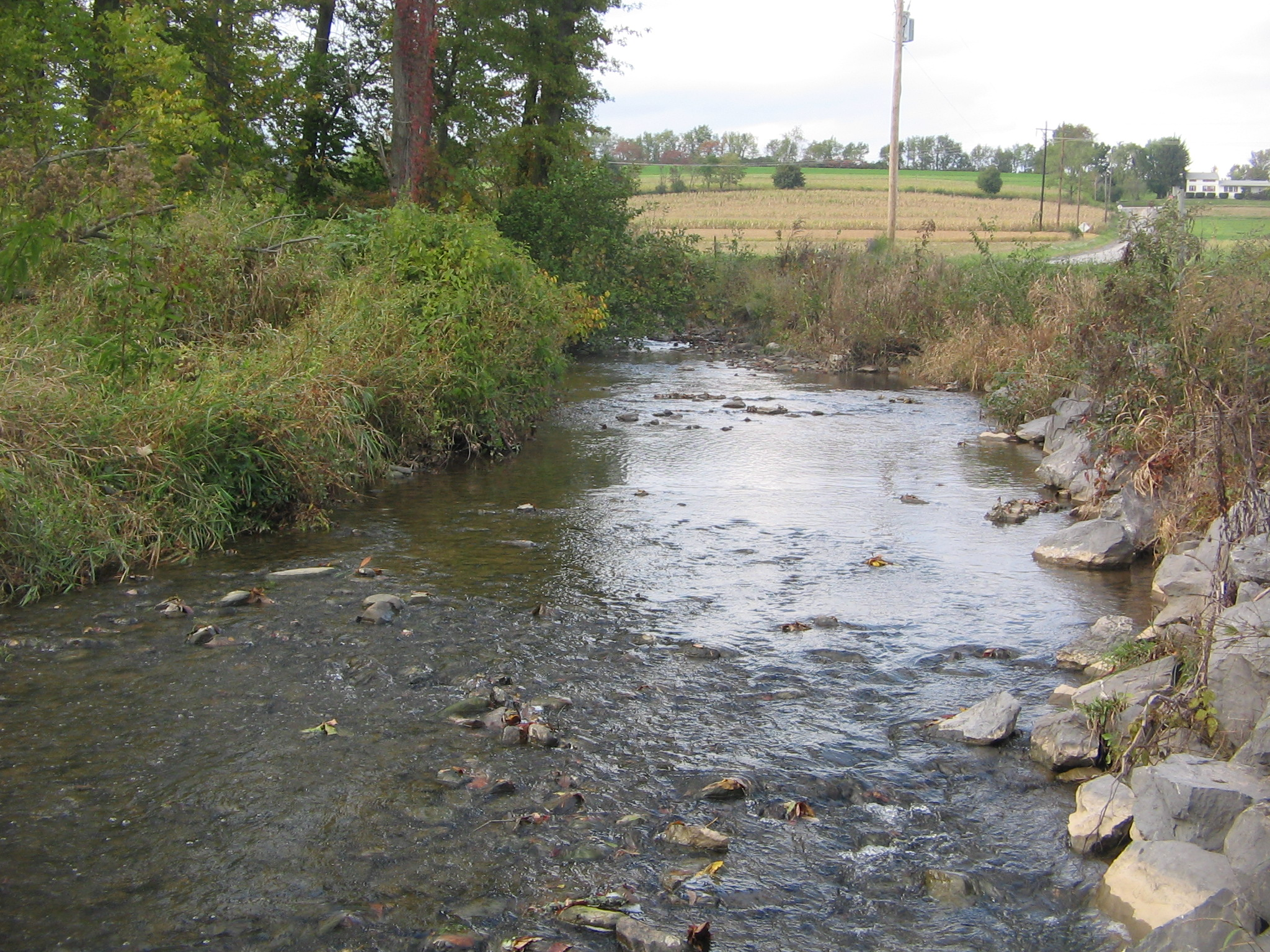
- Buffalo Creek from the Hayes Bridge in West Buffalo Township, Union County, Pennsylvania

Physical characteristics
- Source
  - location: Branch Mountain in Hartley Township, Union County, Pennsylvania
  - elevation: between 2,080 and 2,100 feet (630 and 640 m)
- Mouth
  - location: West Branch Susquehanna River on the border between Lewisburg, Union County, Pennsylvania and Kelly Township, Union County, Pennsylvania
  - coordinates: 40°58′09″N 76°52′57″W
  - elevation: between 420 and 440 feet (130 and 130 m)
- Length: 28.5 mi (45.9 km)
- Basin size: 134 sq mi (350 km^{2})

Basin features
- Progression: West Branch Susquehanna River → Susquehanna River → Chesapeake Bay
- Tributaries
  - left: North Branch Buffalo Creek, Rapid Run, Stony Run, Spruce Run, Little Buffalo Creek
  - right: Beaver Run

Buffalo Creek is a tributary of the West Branch Susquehanna River in Union County, Pennsylvania, in the United States. It is approximately 28.5 miles (45.9 km) long and flows through Hartley Township, Lewis Township, West Buffalo Township, Mifflinburg, Buffalo Township, Kelly Township, and Lewisburg. Its watershed has an area of 134 square miles (350 km^{2}). It is in the ridge-and-valley province of the Appalachian Mountains. Some streams and parts of streams in the creek's watershed are high-quality cold-water fisheries. There are ten types of rock formations and eight types of soil series in the watershed. The forests in the Buffalo Creek watershed are mostly deciduous hardwood, hemlock, and pine.

The waters of Buffalo Creek are slightly acidic, with a pH ranging between 5.0 and 6.7. Metals such as magnesium have been observed in the waters. Nonmetals in the water include dissolved oxygen, calcium carbonate, suspended solids, and phosphorus.

The etymology of Buffalo Creek is unknown. No buffalo have ever been definitively observed on the creek, although there are rumors about old buffalo wallows. Buffalo Township, Buffalo Valley, and Buffalo Mountain are all named after the creek. Historical industries in the watershed included mills and timbering, but livestock raising and agriculture are more common in the 21st century.

== Course ==
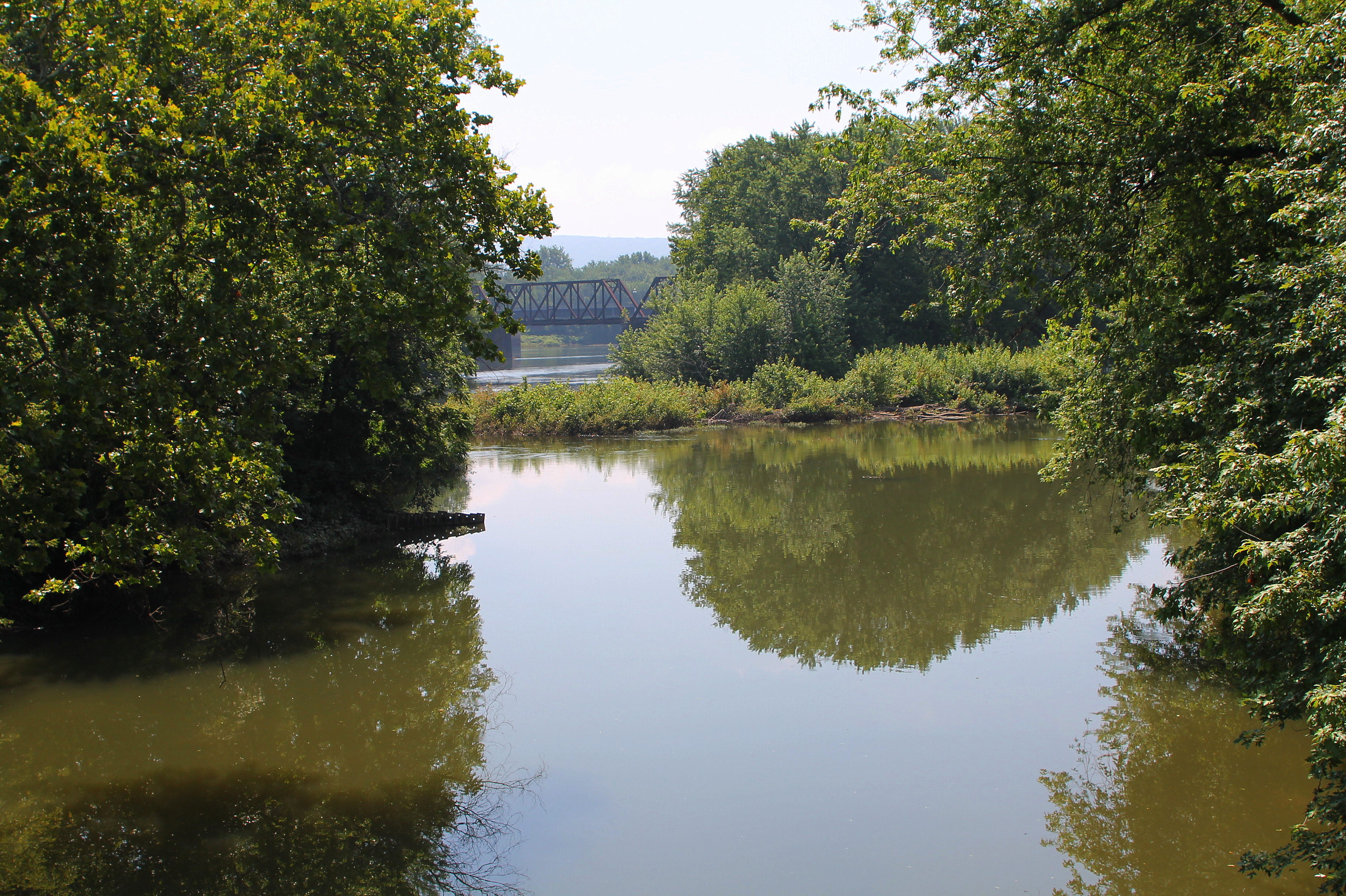
Buffalo Creek looking downstream near its mouth

Buffalo Creek begins in Hartley Township, in Union County, near the Union County/Centre County border. It flows east and slightly north between Buffalo Mountain and Branch Mountain before falling steeply through two geographical features known as the Gooseneck and Buffalo Gap. The creek then turns southeast and flows out of Hartley Township. Upon leaving Hartley Township, the creek enters Lewis Township and meanders eastward, south of Jones Mountain. It passes through the Mifflinburg Reservoir. The creek then flows into southern West Buffalo Township and northern Mifflinburg. Shortly before exiting West Buffalo Township, Buffalo Creek picks up its tributary North Branch Buffalo Creek and briefly turns northwards before turning eastward again and leaving the township.

Upon leaving West Buffalo Township, Buffalo Creek flows into Buffalo Township. It then turns northeast and passes by the community of Cowan and under Pennsylvania Route 192. The creek then picks up its tributary Stony Run before passing the community of Cameron and picking up Spruce Run. At this point, Buffalo Creek flows along the border between Buffalo Township and Kelly Township. Buffalo Creek then meanders in an eastward direction, passing near a quarry, the community of Kelly Point, and the Lewisburg Federal Penitentiary. After leaving Buffalo Township, the creek flows briefly along the border between Kelly Township and Lewisburg before discharging into the West Branch Susquehanna River.

Buffalo Creek joins the West Branch Susquehanna River 7.73 miles (12.44 km) upriver of its mouth.

=== Tributaries ===
Buffalo Creek has six named tributaries: Little Buffalo Creek, Spruce Run, Beaver Run, Stony Run, Rapid Run, and North Branch Buffalo Creek. Little Buffalo Creek joins Buffalo Creek 3.30 miles (5.31 km) upstream of its mouth and its watershed has an area of 19.0 square miles (49 km^{2}), while Spruce Run joins Buffalo Creek 7.70 miles (12.39 km) upstream of its mouth and its watershed has an area of 27.2 square miles (70 km^{2}). Beaver Run joins Buffalo Creek 8.60 miles (13.84 km) upstream of its mouth and its watershed has an area of 4.78 square miles (12.4 km^{2}), while Stony Run joins Buffalo Creek 9.68 miles (15.58 km) upstream of its mouth and its watershed has an area of 1.46 square miles (3.8 km^{2}). Rapid Run joins Buffalo Creek 10.22 miles (16.45 km) upstream of its mouth and its watershed has an area of 18.7 square miles (48 km^{2}), while North Branch Buffalo Creek joins Buffalo Creek 13.34 miles (21.47 km) upstream of its mouth and its watershed has an area of 22.9 square miles (59 km^{2}).

== Hydrology ==
The pH of the waters of Buffalo Creek at three sites ranges from 5.0 to 6.7. Out of six times that the pH of the waters of the creek was measured in the springs and summers of 2010 and 2012, the lowest pH, 5.0, occurred at the location BC-6 on July 27, 2012. The highest pH, 6.7, occurred at the location known as BC-5 on June 15, 2010. The average pH during that time was approximately 5.6467. On the same six times that the creek's pH was measured, its water temperature was also measured. The lowest temperature was 10 °C (50 °F) and it occurred on May 12, 2012 at the location known as BC-7. The highest temperature was 17 °C (63 °F) and it occurred on June 15, 2010 at BC-5. The water temperature of Buffalo Creek has been measured to steadily increase from 8 °C (46 °F) to nearly 12 °C (54 °F) between the creek's source and its mouth. The pH of the waters of the creek ranges from slightly over 4 to 8. The lowest pH occurs near the headwaters. Within a few miles, the pH rises to nearly 6. It fluctuates between 7 and 8 for the final two thirds of the creek.

The concentration of dissolved oxygen in the waters of Buffalo Creek ranges between approximately 8.5 milligrams per liter and close to 11 milligrams per liter. The lowest concentration occurs near the headwaters of the creek. The concentration rises for the first few miles before declining to under 10 milligrams per liter in the lower reaches of the creek.

The concentration of magnesium in the waters of Buffalo Creek ranges from nearly 0 to almost 15 milligrams per liter. The concentration is close to 0 for the first third of the creek's course, but then rises to two or three milligrams per liter. The magnesium concentration reaches its peak around halfway between the source and the mouth, then steadily declines to slightly under ten milligrams per liter at the mouth. However, one of Buffalo Creek's tributaries has a magnesium concentration of nearly 35 milligrams per liter.

The concentration of calcium carbonate in the waters of Buffalo Creek ranges from less than 10 milligrams per liter to 100 milligrams per liter. In the upper half of the creek, the concentration is less than 50 milligrams per liter. Around Mifflinburg, it rises to its peak of 100 milligrams per liter. The concentration declines to 70 milligrams per liter at the confluence with Spruce Run, but rises to about 80 milligrams per liter at the mouth of Buffalo Creek. One tributary of the creek has a concentration of 250 milligrams per liter. The calcium concentration in the creek ranges from virtually 0 milligrams per liter to over 40 milligrams per liter. The concentration is under 10 milligrams per liter until the point where Hoover Road goes over Buffalo Creek, at which point it rises to about 15 milligrams per liter. At Mifflinburg, the concentration rises to its peak before dropping to around 30 milligrams per liter between Mifflinburg and the Susquehanna River.

The concentration of phosphorus in the waters of Buffalo Creek ranges from about 0 milligrams per liter to over 0.2 milligrams per liter. In most of the upper part of the creek, the concentration is very low, under 0.05 milligrams per liter. However, it is over 0.2 milligrams per liter where Buffalo Flat Road passes over the creek. The concentration in Mifflinburg is 0.06 or 0.07 milligrams per liter. It steadily declines to about 0.03 milligrams per liter near the mouth.

The total amount of suspended solids in the waters of Buffalo Creek ranges from approximately 2 milligrams per liter to about 17 milligrams per liter. For the first few miles of the creek, it increases steadily before jumping to about 7 milligrams per liter where Aikey Road passes over the creek. For the rest of the way downstream, the concentration fluctuates largely. The highest concentrations are at Mifflinburg, where the concentration is 17 milligrams per liter, and at Lewisburg, near the mouth, where the concentration is almost 15 milligrams per liter. The sediment of sediment flowing through Buffalo Creek and all its tributaries in 2000 and 2008 was approximately 18,000,000 pounds (8,200,000 kg) per year.

The concentration of ammonium in the waters of Buffalo Creek ranges from 0.01 milligrams per liter to almost 0.12 milligrams per liter. Not far from the headwaters, the concentration is at its lowest, but it rises to its peak at Buffalo Flat Road. The concentration then falls to 0.02 milligrams per liter at Aikey Road, before rising to 0.05 milligrams per liter at Johnson Mill Road, near the confluence of Spruce Run and Buffalo Creek. The concentration then fluctuates slightly between there and the mouth of Buffalo Creek. The amount of nitrogen flowing through Buffalo Creek and all its tributaries in 2000 and 2008 was approximately 930,000 pounds (420,000 kg) per year.

The pH and calcium carbonate concentration have both increased in the upper reaches of Buffalo Creek since September 2009, as has the water temperature. The phosphorus concentration at the point where Buffalo Flat Road passes over Buffalo Creek has increased by at least tenfold since September 2009.

Parts of Coal Run, Rapid Run, Beaver Run, and Muddy Run are impaired or possibly impaired by agriculture.

== Geography, geology, and climate ==
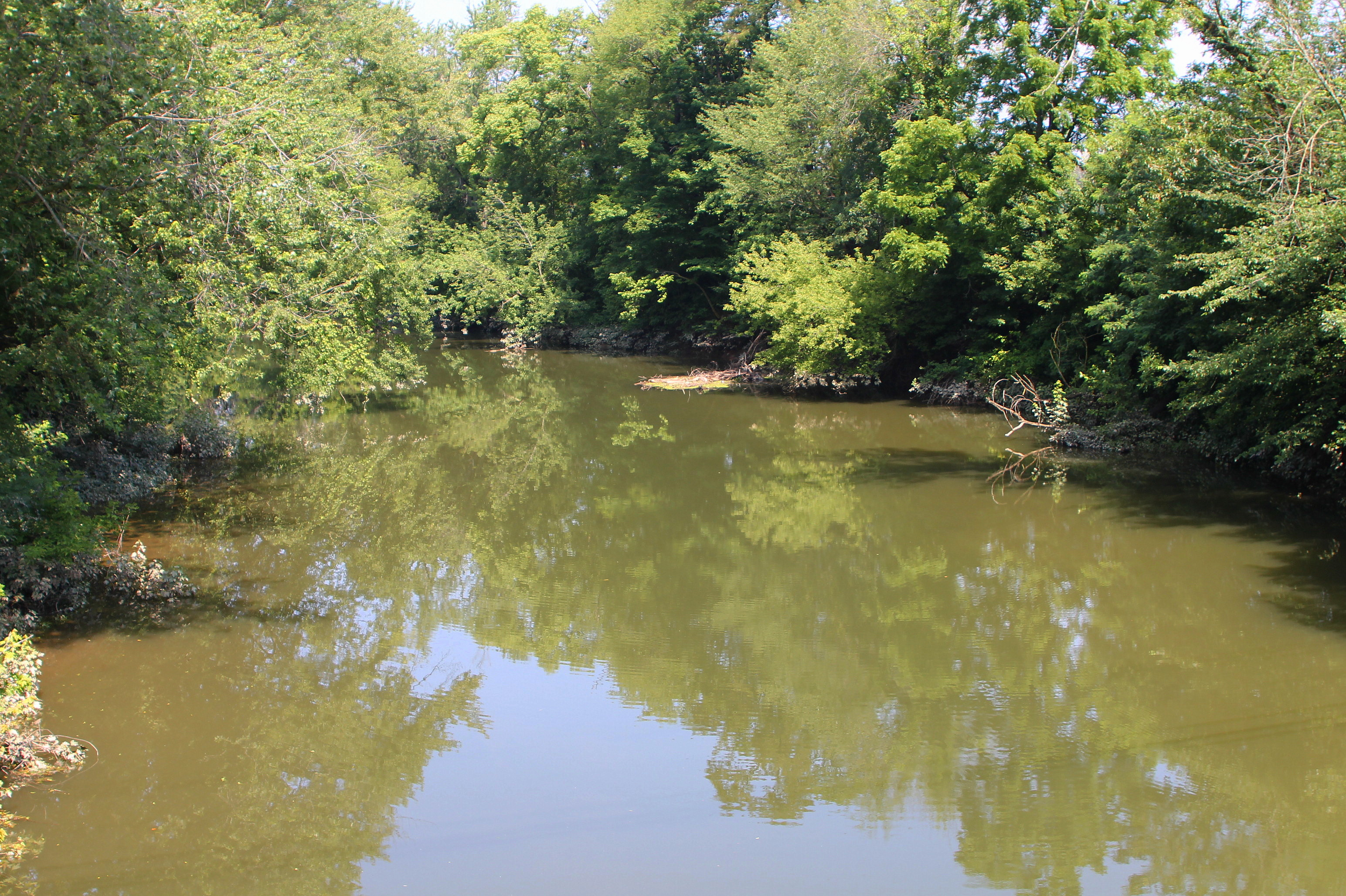
Buffalo Creek looking upstream near its mouth

The elevation of the mouth of Buffalo Creek is between 420 and 440 feet (130 and 130 m) above sea level. The elevation of the creek's source is between 2,080 and 2,100 feet (630 and 640 m) above sea level. Between 8.5 miles (13.7 km) upstream of its mouth and it mouth, a distance of 8.5 miles (13.7 km) the creek's gradient is 6.9 feet per mile (1.31 m/km). Between Mifflinburg and Lewisburg, the gradient is 7 feet per mile (1.3 m/km).

The topography of the creek's watershed is mountainous in its upper reaches. However, in its lower reaches, the creek flows through a wide valley bordered by steep ridges. The creek's channel is sinuous and flows through rock formations consisting of sandstone and limestone, with some iron ore. All of the creek's watershed is located in the ridge and valley physiographic province. It contains fractured, faulted, and folded sedimentary rocks. While there is some young bedrock in the watershed, parts of it have eroded away to reveal older bedrock, which is more resistant to weathering than the younger bedrock. Old bedrock formations in the watershed include the Tuscarora Formation, the Juniata Formation, and the Bald Eagle Formation. The visible portions of these formations are sandstones and conglomerates. The floor of the Buffalo Creek valley is home to younger carbonates belonging to the Keyser Formation and the Tonoloway Formation.

Undivided Keyser and Tonoloway Formations occur in the southern and southeastern parts of the Buffalo Creek watershed. The Hamilton Group occurs in a small portion of the southeastern part of the watershed. Undivided Onondaga and Old Port Formations also occur here, but take up a bigger area in the watershed. The Bald Eagle Formation occurs in small parts of the western and northwestern areas of the watershed. The Juniata Formation occurs in the same areas as the Bald Eagle Formation, as well as part of the northern part of the watershed. However, it takes up more area than the Bald Eagle Formation. The Reedsville Formation also occurs in the western and northwestern parts of the watershed. The undivided Bloomsburg and Mifflintown Formations occur in a zigzagging band that goes from the northeastern to the southwestern part of the watershed. The Clinton Group occurs in a zigzagging band immediately north of the Bloomsburg and Mifflinville Formations. It also occurs in a few scattered areas in the northeastern and western parts of the watershed. The Tuscarora Formation occurs in a zigzagging band immediately north of the Clinton Group. The Wills Creek Formation occurs in parts of the southern and northeastern areas.

There are a number of soil associations that occur in significant amounts in the Buffalo Creek watershed. These include the Allenwood-Alvira-Shelmadine, the Dekalb-Ungers-Hazelton, the Edom, the Hagerstown-Elliber-Washington, the Holly-Basher-Monongahela, the Klinesville-Calvin-Meckesville, the Laidig-Buchanan-Meckesville, and the Weikert-Berks-Hartleton soil associations.

There are four different types of soils by levels of permeability and runoff potential in the Buffalo Creek watershed. These are rated from A to D, with A-type soils having the highest level of permeability and lowest runoff potential and D having the lowest level of permeability and highest runoff potential. C-type soils are the most common, and occur in the eastern and central parts of the watershed. B-type soils primarily occur in the western part of the watershed. D-type soils are scattered throughout the watershed and A-type soils occur in areas of the southern and southeastern parts of the watershed.

Near Mifflinburg, Buffalo Creek is "tiny and twisting" and its path is interrupted by fences and logs. There are also some strainers along its length. The creek is shallow for much of its length, even in stream pools. It mainly descends via gentle riffles. However, there is a weir with a height of 1 foot (0.30 m) downstream of Mazeppa.

Buffalo Creek flows through the center of the Buffalo Valley. In the early 1900s, the average rate of precipitation in the watershed was 40 to 45 inches (100 to 110 cm) per year.

== Watershed ==
The watershed of Buffalo Creek has an area of 134 square miles (350 km^{2}). The watershed contains the central portion of Union County and the eastern portion of Centre County. A total of 60 percent of the creek's watershed is forest. Much of this land is located in Bald Eagle State Forest. In general, most of the forested land in the watershed is in its northern and western areas. A total of 34 percent of the watershed is devoted to agriculture. Most of this land is situated near Lewisburg and Mifflinburg. The remaining 6 percent of the watershed's land is residential, urban, and industrial. The creek's watershed takes up the largest portion of Union County for any watershed. The drainage pattern of the watershed is dendritic.

The Buffalo Creek watershed receives 42 inches (110 cm) of precipitation on average. The average temperature is 51 °F (11 °C). A total of almost 15,000 people reside within the boundaries of the watershed. The community that contains the largest portion of the watershed is West Buffalo Township, which contains 22.87 percent of the watershed's area. The community that contains the largest portion of the watershed is Mifflinburg, which contains 1.3 percent of the watershed's area. The creek is near US Route 15 and Interstate 80.

The headwaters of Buffalo Creek are acidic due to geological formations that occur there. Also, the federal government states that there are 3945 acres of flood plains in the watershed. There are 800 acres of wetlands in the watershed.

The Buffalo Creek watershed contains two reservoirs for water supply. One, which is situated on North Branch Buffalo Creek, belongs to Mifflinburg Borough. The other, which is situated on Spruce Run, belongs to the Pennsylvania-American Water Company. The main highways in the Buffalo Creek watershed are Pennsylvania Route 45 and Pennsylvania Route 192, which run east-to-west through the central part of the watershed. U.S. Route 15 also passes briefly through the watershed, near the creek mouth. The population of the watershed is approximately 15,000, but it may increase to 20,000 by 2020 and 27,000 by 2030.

== History ==
The etymology of Buffalo Creek's name is unknown. In the 1700s, it was one of eight streams named Buffalo Creek in Pennsylvania, despite the almost total absence of buffalo in the state in that century. Except for legends, there is virtually no evidence that any buffalo ever lived in the Buffalo Creek area. However, some residents of the nearby village of Cowan claim that depressions on the northern bank of Buffalo Creek are buffalo wallows.

Buffalo Valley and Buffalo Mountain may have been named after Buffalo Creek.

Until the middle or the end of the 1700s, much of the Buffalo Creek watershed was on the frontier. During this time, there were many forts, such as Fort Titzell in the watershed. In 1769, the northern side of Buffalo Creek was surveyed. In the same year, the area in the vicinity of the creek was opened to settlers. John Sierer was among the first to arrive, settling on the creek in 1769. The prominent Revolutionary War veteran Colonel John Kelly built an estate on the northern bank of Buffalo Creek. In 1780, there was an Indian attack near the mouth of the creek.

Sawmills and gristmills were built in the watershed in the early 1800s and there was a mill on the creek by 1788. A large number of small mills producing grist, cider, woolens, and lumber were once on North Branch Buffalo Creek. There was a log school on Buffalo Creek in the 1830s. By the late 1800s, there was a significant lumbering industry. This also caused railroads to be built in the watershed. The lumbering industry became less prominent in the early 1900s. In the late 1800s, the area along North Branch Buffalo Creek was heavily settled and known as Jonestown. A county road paralleled the creek here. In the late 1800s or early 1900s, a locomotive crashed into Buffalo Creek while crossing it.

A gauging station was constructed on Buffalo Creek near Lewisburg in September 1913. In the early 1900s, the main industries in the creek's watershed included agriculture, furniture factories, flour mills, and brick works. The tributary Spruce Run was also used as a water supply by the White Deer Mountain Water Company and the main stem was used as power for some small gristmills. During this time period, major communities in the watershed included Lewisburg (3085 people), Mifflinburg (1559 people), Mazeppa (185 people), Cowan (150 people), Buffalo Roads (142 people), and Kelly Point (97 people). The Pennsylvania Railroad also went through the southern part of the watershed during the early 1900s.

In modern times the population of the watershed of Buffalo Creek has been rising, unlike the surrounding areas. The production of timber was once a major industry in the watershed. However, farming and livestock production are more common.

== Biology ==
The drainage basin of Buffalo Creek upstream of State Route 3005 is designated as a High-Quality Coldwater Fishery and a Migratory Fishery. Between State Route 3005 and Rapid Run, the drainage basin is designated as a Coldwater Fishery and a Migratory Fishery. Downstream of this point, the watershed is designated as a Trout-Stocked Fishery and a Migratory Fishery. Wild trout naturally reproduce in the creek from the headwaters downstream 8th Street bridge in Mifflinburg, a distance of 13.76 miles (22.14 km). Half of the Pennsylvania Fish and Boat Commission approved trout waters in Union County are in the watershed of Buffalo Creek.

Birds in the Buffalo Creek watershed include raptors, waterfowl, songbirds, and wild turkeys. Mammals in the watershed include rodents, foxes, raccoons, opossums, skunks, white-tailed deer, and black bears. The colder streams in the watershed contain brook trout and brown trout, while the warmer streams contain suckers and smallmouth bass.

The forest that make up much of the Buffalo Creek watershed consist mostly of deciduous hardwood trees. However, there are some hemlock and pine trees in the watershed as well.

A total of 134 taxa of macroinvertebrates have been observed on the tributary North Branch Buffalo Creek as of May 11, 2012. The average Shannon index in the watershed is 2.2. The Pielou’s Evenness of the watershed is 0.77. EPT testing of microinvertebrate concentration resulted in an EPT index of 15. These values all indicate a relatively healthy stream.

In the summer of 2011, the average number of fecal coliform colonies per 100 milliliters of water in the upper reaches of Buffalo Creek ranged from 291 to over 600. The average number of enterococcus colonies per 100 milliliters ranged from 1 to 257. The average number of bacteroides in the lower reaches of the creek per 100 milliliters ranged from 2193 to 13,708. In the upper reaches, the range was 668 to 5893. The average number of fecal coliform colonies per 100 milliliters in the lower reaches of the creek ranged from 330 to over 600. The average number of enterococcus colonies per 100 milliliters in the lower reaches of the creek ranged from 91 to 418.

In the summer of 2011, 4.55% of the bacteroides in the upper part of Buffalo Creek came from humans, 11.13% came from bovines, 34.74% came from pigs, and 49.58% came from other sources, such as horses. In the lower part of the creek, 1.78% came from humans, 3.78% came from bovines, 15.53% came from birds, 23.38% came from pigs, and 55.53% came from other sources, such as horses.

Buffalo Creek has a higher level of bacterial contamination than the nearby Penns Creek and White Deer Creek. There is a possibility of fecal contamination in the creek.

== Recreation ==
The lower 14.8 miles (23.8 km) of Buffalo Creek, from Mifflinburg downstream to Lewisburg, are navigable by canoe during snowmelt and within four days of hard rain. The creek's difficulty rating is 1 and its scenery is described as "good" in Edward Gertler's book Keystone Canoeing.

Two of Buffalo Creek's tributaries, Spruce Run and Rapid Run, are high-quality cold-water fisheries. The upper portion of Buffalo Creek itself also has this rating. The Raymond B. Winter State Park is near the headwaters of Rapid Run. The Bald Eagle State Forest is also in the watershed. The creek is commonly visited by anglers and birdwatchers. In the watershed, other common recreational activities include driving, cross-country skiing, horseback riding, mountain biking, camping, swimming, and canoeing.

The levels of bacteria in Buffalo Creek are higher than the maximum levels considered safe for swimming. However, the number of pathogens in the stream that are caused by farm animals could be reduced by 80 percent.

== See also ==
- Limestone Run (Union County, Pennsylvania), next tributary of the West Branch Susquehanna River going downriver
- Limestone Run (Montour and Northumberland Counties, Pennsylvania), next tributary of the West Branch Susquehanna River going upriver
- List of rivers of Pennsylvania
