= Central Oak Heights =

Summer cottage community in Kelly Township, Pennsylvania

Central Oak Heights, Pennsylvania, USA
- Location within Pennsylvania
- Location: Kelly Township, Union County, Pennsylvania, USA
- Nearest city: Milton, Pennsylvania
- Coordinates: 41°00′41″N 76°52′14″W
- Area: 55 acres (22 ha)
- Established: 1909
- Governing body: Central Oak Heights Cottage Holders formerly owned by the United Methodist Church

a map of Central Oak Heights in Kelly Township, Pennsylvania

Central Oak Heights is an association of cottage owners on 45 acres (0.22 km^{2}) of wooded land in Kelly Township, Union County, Pennsylvania in the United States. It was founded in 1909 as a religious campground and retreat by the Bible Conference Society of Central Pennsylvania of the United Evangelical Church.

Ownership of the land passed through several churches when in 1946, the Evangelical Church merged with the United Brethren in Christ at a meeting in Johnstown, PA to form the Evangelical United Brethren Church. This body, in turn, united with the American Methodist Church in 1968 to form the United Methodist Church. The Central Oak Heights Association, a non-profit corporation founded in 1987, took over ownership of the land in 1990. Although no longer affiliated in an official capacity with the United Methodist Church, a great majority of the cottage owners are members of United Methodist Church.

The grounds of Central Oak Heights are traditionally open during the summer months only, beginning with Memorial Day in late May and closing soon after Labor Day weekend in early September. But the official opening is April 15 and the grounds close for the winter on October 15. Most of the cottages are privately owned and occupied during the summer months by the owners. There are several cottages and dozens of rustic cabins that are available to rent. Also available to rent, is the Shaffer Building, a large dormitory style building, a dining hall, the tabernacle, an open air church with auditorium style seating, Sylvan Chapel a chapel in the woods near the cabins, a swimming pool and two picnic pavilions.

== History ==
The Bible Conference Society of Central Pennsylvania of the United Evangelical Church was founded in 1894 by a group of Evangelicals from Central Pennsylvania that were interested in holding camp meetings or bible conferences. They held their first summer meeting at Pine Grove near Lock Haven in the summer of 1894. A location near West Milton known as Miller's Grove was thought by the members of the conference was thought to be the ideal location for their meetings, but it was not available to purchase until 1907. The Evangelicals of Central Pennsylvania continued to hold their meetings at various locations in the Susquehanna Valley including Sylvan Dell in Armstrong Township near South Williamsport and Grace Church in Lewistown.

=== Miller's Grove ===
Central Oak Heights is situated on a knoll overlooking the West Branch Susquehanna River in Union County, Pennsylvania. It is across the river from Milton and just downstream from West Milton. This small hill was originally occupied by a small band of Shawnee who were governed by Shikellamy of the Iroquois. Shikellamy's main village was just downstream at present day Northumberland at the confluence of the West and North Branches of the Susquehanna Rivers. This land was acquired from the Indians under the terms of the Walking Purchase and the later Treaty of Fort Stanwix. Josh Hoffman was the first white man to hold a deed to the land. He received his patent in 1770. The land was owned by George Miller at the time it was sold to the Bible Conference Society of Central Pennsylvania of the United Evangelical Church. Mr. Miller was very found of "Miller's Grove" and sought to protect the stand of virgin oak that stood on his hill. One of the conditions of the purchase of the land was that the oaks be left standing. The Evangelicals paid $4,816.35 for the hilltop. They agreed to allow the oaks trees to continue to grow and most importantly they had a permanent home for their summertime meetings.

=== Buildings ===
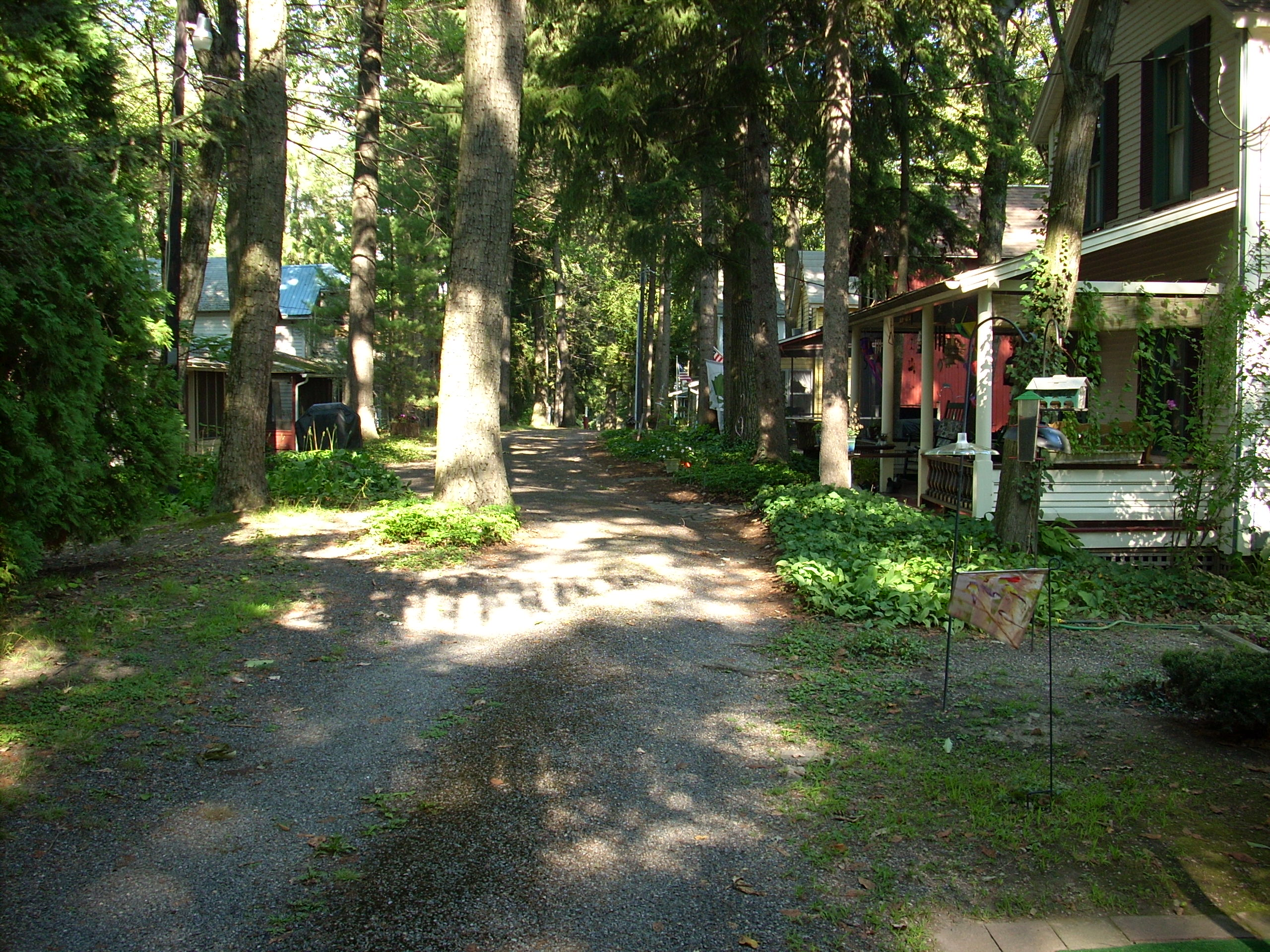
Some of the cottages at Central Oak Heights

The first camp meetings were held at Central Oak Heights in the summer of 1909. As many as 6,000 people came to the hilltop for these meetings. They arrived from the train stations in Milton and West Milton or if they lived close by they came on their horse-drawn wagons and carriages. Some campers stayed in tents and others set about the task of building the cottages that stand today at the Heights. The first structures that were built included the octagonal outdoor church known as the Tabernacle, a cottage and a dormitory. Over the years more and more cottages were built on the hilltop. The founders of Central Oak Heights also commissioned the building of a summer camp on the southern slopes of the hill. This camp, closed in the 1980s, served as a summer camp for Evangelical and later United Methodist youth from throughout the United States. The cottagers and campers swam in the river at what was to become Milton State Park before a swimming pool was built. The pool was built due to safety concerns regarding crossing the train tracks and U.S. Route 15 to get to the riverside. This pool was open to the youth of the summer camp and to the families that owned the cottages. A large dining hall was built in the 1950s for the camp. This Dining Hall was actually moved several hundred feet to the northwest in the 1960s. The move saved it from being demolished, since the old location was over the present-day site of Route 15, which was being expanded at the time from two lanes to four. Also built during this time period was Sylvan Chapel. This chapel is set deep in the woods of the campground.

== Today ==
The Central Oak Heights of today is much different that what it was like in the early days. Most of the cottage owners are retired. They gather there in the summers with their families and enjoy the cool temperatures provided by the abundant shade given by the trees. Revival meetings have long since been discontinued, although Sunday worship services continue to be held in the original Tabernacle. The summer camp which ended in the 1980s is a part of history. The cabins still stand. Some have fallen into disuse and others are rented out to the occasional family or youth group. The swimming pool, dining hall, and pavilions are also rented to families and youth groups, and they receive regular use from the families of the cottage holders.

In the Summer of 2009, the Heights celebrated its 100th anniversary. Many events took place on the grounds, including guided tours, concerts, open houses, picnics, and even Antique car rides.
