= Slifer House =

Demolished historic house in Pennsylvania, United States

- U.S. National Register of Historic Places
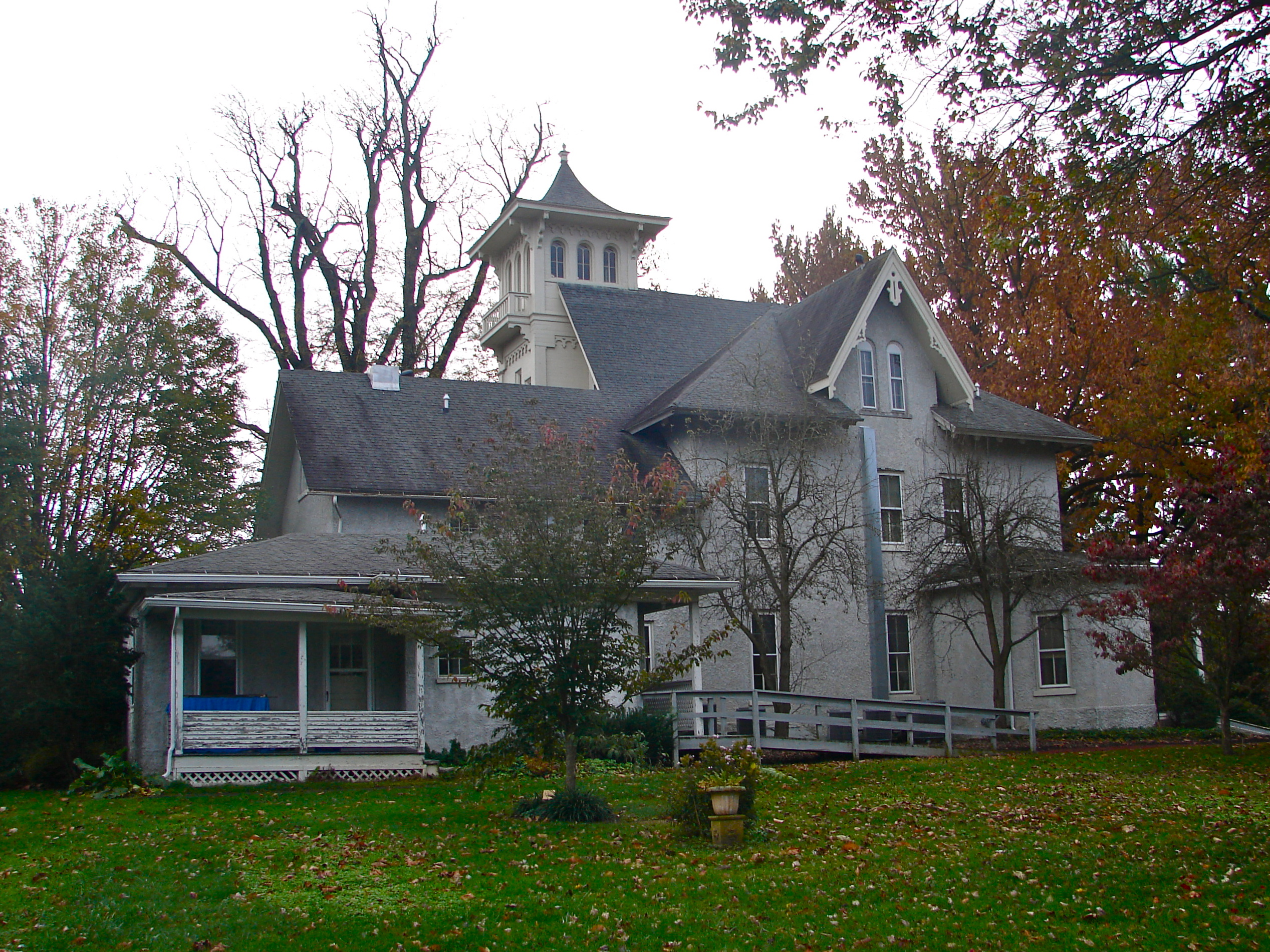
- Slifer House, October 2011

- Location within Pennsylvania Location within the United States
- Location: North of Lewisburg off U.S. Route 15 on Pennsylvania Route 59024, Kelly Township, Pennsylvania
- Coordinates: 40°58′33″N 76°52′59″W
- Area: less than one acre
- Built: 1861 (165 years ago)
- Architect: Samuel Sloan
- Architectural style: Victorian
- NRHP reference No.: 75001668
- Added to NRHP: June 18, 1975

Slifer House, also known as the Administration Building-Evangelical Home, was a historic home in Kelly Township, Pennsylvania, United States. It was listed on the National Register of Historic Places in 1975.

== History and architectural features ==
Designed by noted Philadelphia architect Samuel Sloan, this historic structure was built in 1861 as a country home for Lewisburg merchant Eli Slifer (1818–1888). It has a 2 1/2-story, brick, square main section, with two rectangular rear wings. The main section has a hipped roof with cross gables and was designed in a Victorian style. It features wraparound and two-story porches and a four-story square tower, and has housed elder care facilities since 1916, when it was purchased by the Evangelical Association.

This house was listed on the National Register of Historic Places in 1975, and is now owned by Albright Care Services, which operated it as a Victorian-era historic house museum until the museum's closure in 2022. It featured artifacts from its use over the years as a home for seniors, orphanage and community hospital. The house was demolished in 2026.
