= Kelly Township, Union County, Pennsylvania =

Township in Pennsylvania, US

Coordinates: 40°59′59″N 76°52′28″W

Kelly Township, Pennsylvania
- Township
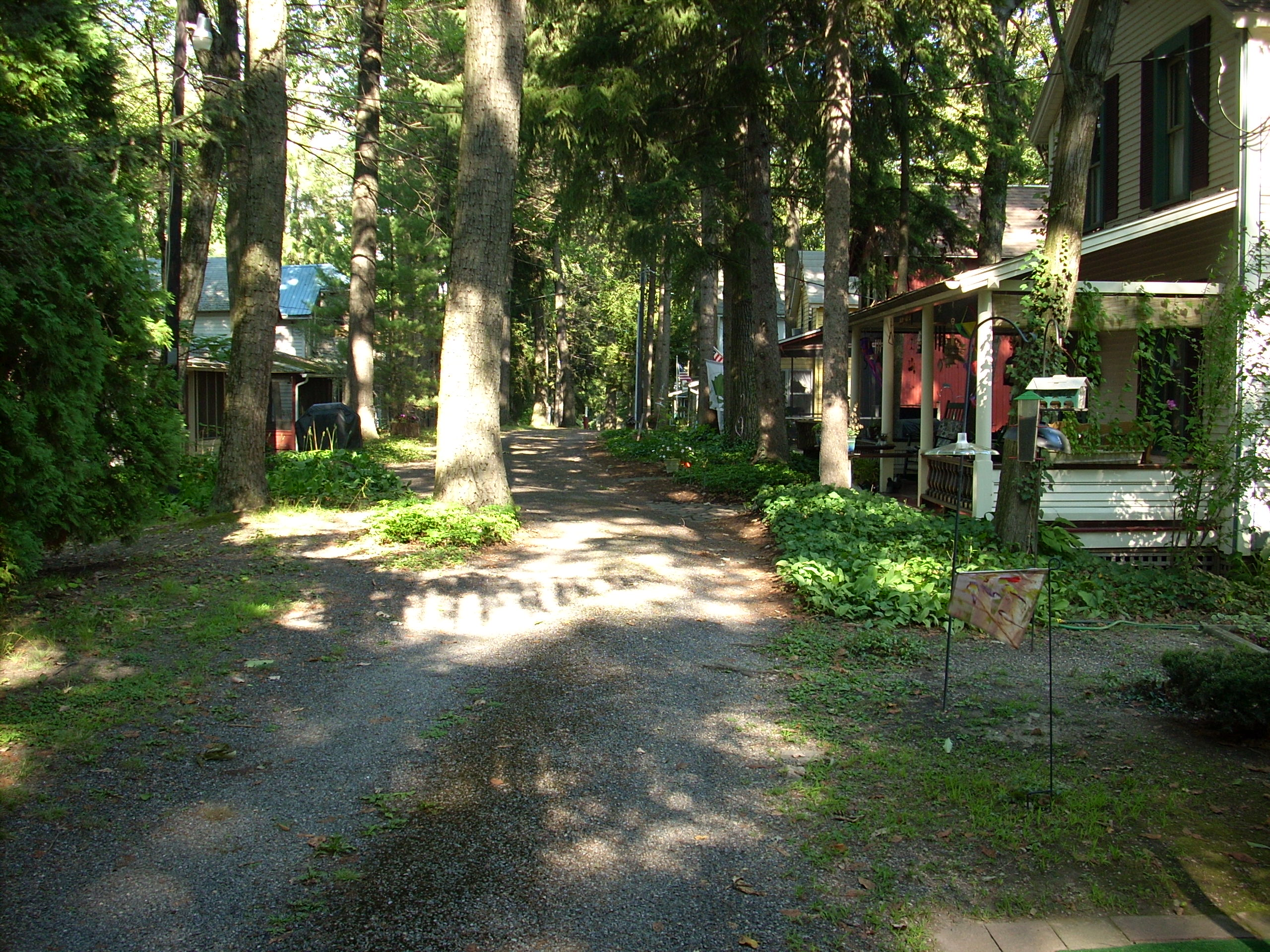
- Central Oak Heights is a summer getaway in Kelly Township.

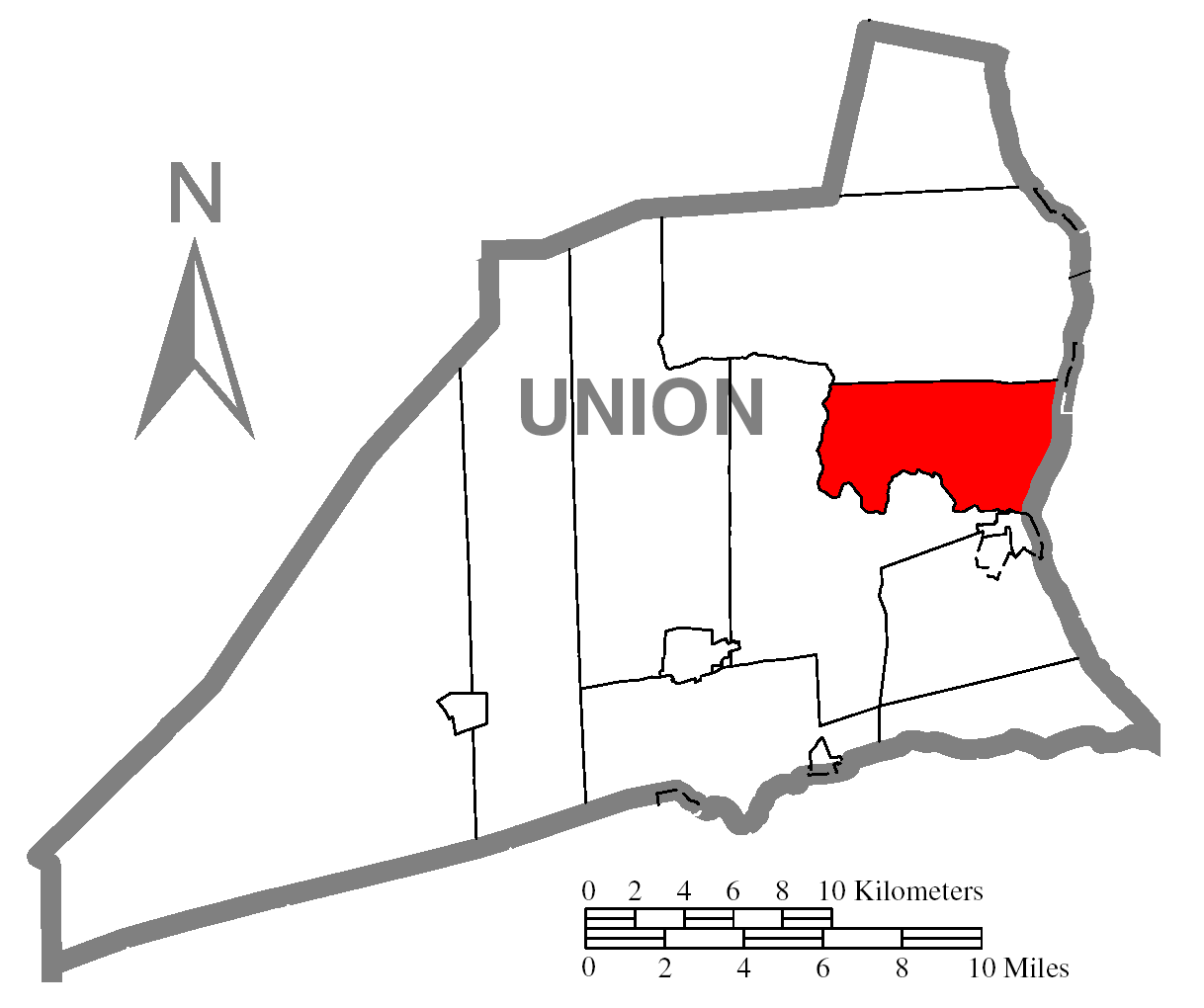
- Map of Union County, Pennsylvania highlighting Kelly Township

- Map of Pennsylvania highlighting Union County
- Country: United States
- State: Pennsylvania
- County: Union
- Settled: 1783
- Incorporated: 1824

Area
  - Total: 17.20 sq mi (44.55 km^{2})
  - Land: 17.17 sq mi (44.47 km^{2})
  - Water: 0.031 sq mi (0.08 km^{2})

Population (2020)
  - Total: 3,993 ▼
  - Estimate (2021): 4,002
  - Density: 326/sq mi (125.9/km^{2})
- Time zone: UTC-5 (EST)
  - Summer (DST): UTC-4 (EDT)
- FIPS code: 42-119-39136
- Website: https://kellytwp.org/

Kelly Township is a township in Union County, Pennsylvania, United States. The population was 3,993 at the 2020 census. The United States Penitentiary, Lewisburg is located in Kelly Township, and not in the nearby Borough of Lewisburg, whose post office serves most of the township (except for its northeastern corner, which is served by the West Milton post office).

== History ==
The Slifer House was added to the National Register of Historic Places in 1975.

== Geography ==
According to the United States Census Bureau, the township has a total area of 17.1 square miles (44 km^{2}), all land.

Kelly Township is bordered by White Deer Township to the north, the West Branch Susquehanna River to the east, across which lies Northumberland County (more specifically, the Borough of Milton and West Chillisquaque Township), Lewisburg to the south and Buffalo Township to the south and west.

== Demographics ==
Historical population
Census	Pop.	Note	%±
2010	5,491		—
2020	3,993		−27.3%
2021 (est.)	4,002		0.2%
U.S. Decennial Census

As of the census of 2000, there were 4,502 people, 1,313 households, and 778 families residing in the township. The population density was 262.6 inhabitants per square mile (101.4/km^{2}). There were 1,369 housing units at an average density of 79.8 per square mile (30.8/km^{2}). The racial makeup of the township was 79.21% White, 18.92% African American, 0.24% Native American, 0.87% Asian, 0.18% from other races, and 0.58% from two or more races. Hispanic or Latino of any race were 6.20% of the population.

There were 1,313 households, out of which 23.2% had children under the age of 18 living with them, 51.5% were married couples living together, 5.9% had a female householder with no husband present, and 40.7% were non-families. 37.3% of all households were made up of individuals, and 23.3% had someone living alone who was 65 years of age or older. The average household size was 2.20 and the average family size was 2.92.

In the township the population was spread out, with 14.3% under the age of 18, 7.7% from 18 to 24, 41.1% from 25 to 44, 19.7% from 45 to 64, and 17.2% who were 65 years of age or older. The median age was 38 years. For every 100 females, there were 188.0 males. For every 100 females age 18 and over, there were 210.0 males.

The median income for a household in the township was $32,843, and the median income for a family was $40,786. Males had a median income of $26,949 versus $19,120 for females. The per capita income for the township was $18,499. About 4.0% of families and 10.3% of the population were below the poverty line, including 9.2% of those under age 18 and 12.1% of those age 65 or over.

== Government ==
There are two polling places (voting) for the township. Kelly Township 1 is located in the Township Municipal Building, 551 Zeigler Rd., Lewisburg. Kelly Township 2 is located in the United in Christ Lutheran Church, 1875 Churches Rd., West Milton.

United States Penitentiary, Lewisburg is in the township.

== Education ==
It is in the Lewisburg Area School District.
