= Mazeppa, Pennsylvania =

Unincorporated community in Pennsylvania, US

Mazeppa
- Populated Place
- Location within Pennsylvania
- Coordinates: 40.9836948°N 76.9883007°W
- Country: United States
- State: Pennsylvania
- County: Union
- Elevation: 515 ft (157 m)
- Zip code: 17837
- Area code: 570
- GNIS feature ID: 1180591

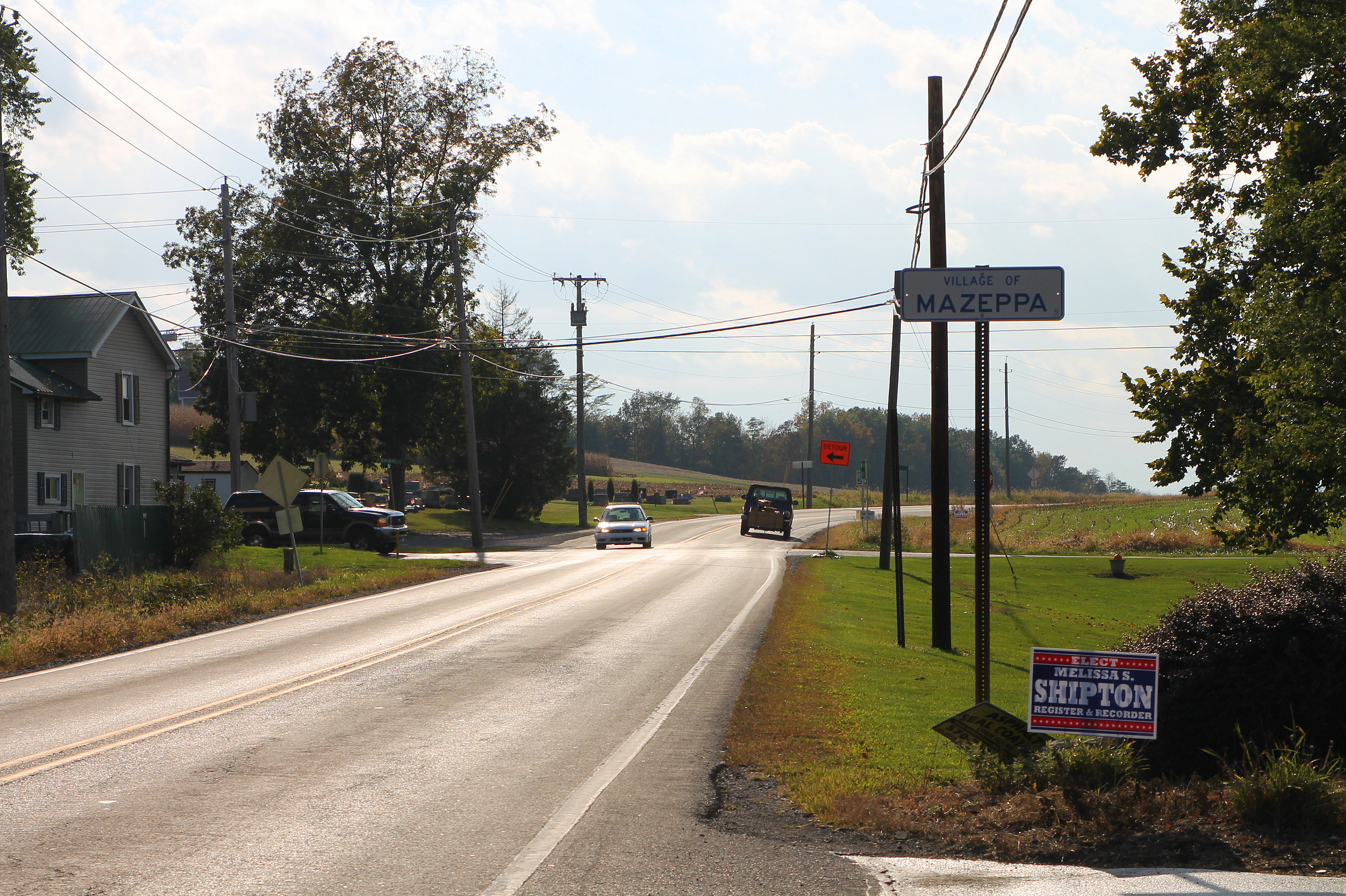
Entering Mazeppa on QR 1002

Mazeppa is a populated place in Union County, Pennsylvania, United States, named in honor of Hetman Ivan Mazepa.

== History ==
The settlement was originally named Union, and later called Boyertown, after early settlers Samuel Boyer (1804 - 1874) and his wife Sarah. A name change was required by the Post Office in 1886, to eliminate confusion with Boyertown, Berks County. Professor Clement E. Edmunds, being familiar with Lord Byron's poem Mazeppa, proposed the new name.

John Rentschler built a mill in 1788. Its name was later anglicized to Rengler, then became known as Johnson Mill after being purchased by Fred I. Johnson in 1930. It operated on water power until 1945, then on diesel power until operations ceased in 1981. This explains the name of Mazeppa's main street, Johnson Mill Road a.k.a. T628 a.k.a. Pennsylvania Quadrant Route 1001.
