= Row crop =

Crop that can be planted in rows

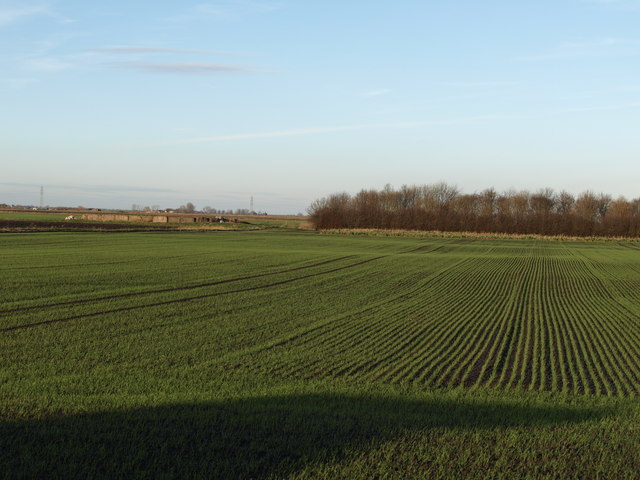
Crop rows

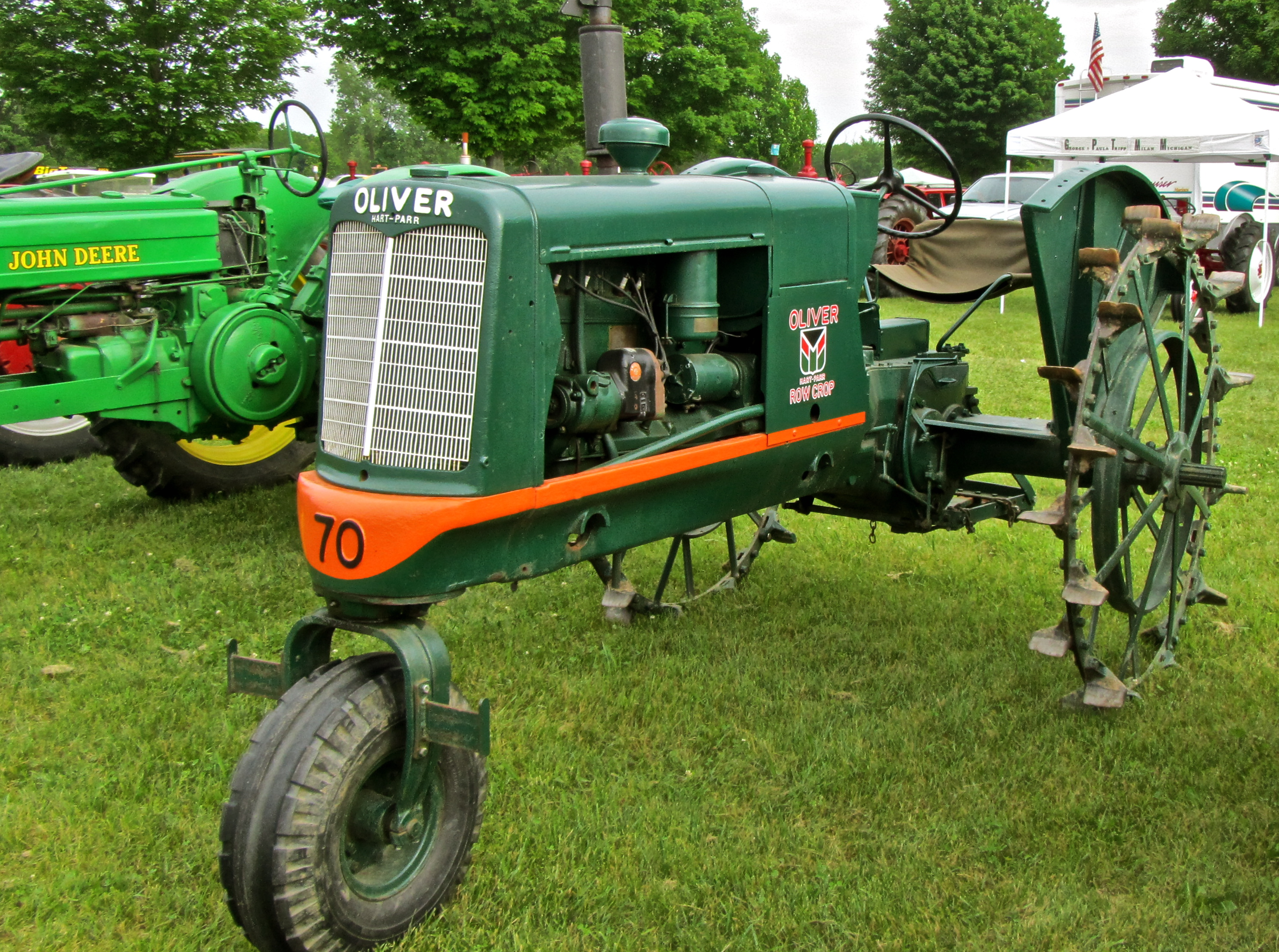
A row crop tractor

A row crop is a crop that can be planted in rows wide enough to allow it to be tilled or otherwise cultivated by agricultural machinery, machinery tailored for the seasonal activities of row crops. Such crops are sown by drilling or transplanting rather than broadcasting. Growing row crops first started in Ancient China in the 6th century BC.

Examples of row crops include sunflower, potato, canola, dry bean, field pea, flax, safflower, buckwheat, cotton, maize, soybeans, and sugar beets.
