= Fracturing Responsibility and Awareness of Chemicals Act =

The Fracturing Responsibility and Awareness of Chemicals Act (H.R. 1084, S. 587, dubbed as the FRAC Act) was a 2009 legislative proposal in the United States Congress to define hydraulic fracturing as a federally regulated activity under the Safe Drinking Water Act. The proposed act would have required the energy industry to disclose the chemical additives used in the hydraulic fracturing fluid. The gas industry opposed the legislation.

The bill was introduced to both houses of the 111th United States Congress on June 9, 2009. The House bill was introduced by representatives Diana DeGette, D-Colo., Maurice Hinchey D-N.Y., and Jared Polis, D-Colo. The Senate version was introduced by senators Bob Casey, D-Pa., and Chuck Schumer, D-N.Y. The bill was re-introduced to both houses of the 112th United States Congress on March 15, 2011, by Representative Diana DeGette and Senator Bob Casey.

== Background ==
The Environmental Protection Agency (EPA) blames the lack of information about the contents of hydraulic fracturing fluid on the Energy Policy Act of 2005 because the law exempts hydraulic fracturing from federal water laws. The Act calls for the "chemical constituents (but not the proprietary chemical formulas) used in the fracturing process." Once these constituents are determined the information must be revealed to the public through the Internet. The FRAC Act would have required that in any case where a physician or a state finds that a medical emergency exists, and that the chemical formulas are needed to treat the ailing individual, the firm must disclose the chemical identity to the state or physician—even if that proprietary formula is a trade-secret chemical. Material Safety Data Sheets, required by the Occupational Safety and Health Administration (OSHA) under 29 CFR 1910.1200 are developed and made available to first responders and other emergency planning and response officials.

The drilling industry opposed the FRAC Act bill. They stated that the bill would have created "an additional layer of regulation that is unneeded and cumbersome." The Independent Petroleum Association of America believes that states already sufficiently regulate hydraulic fracturing. Their research suggests that federal regulation could result in the addition of about $100,000 to each new natural gas well. Energy in Depth, a lobbying group, says the new regulation would be an "unnecessary financial burden on a single small-business industry, American oil, and natural gas producers." This group also claims that the FRAC Act could result in half of the United States oil wells and one third of the gas wells being closed. Also, the bill could cause domestic gas production to drop by 245 billion cubic feet per year along with four billion dollars in lost revenue to the federal government. The Environmental Protection Agency claims that the Safe Drinking Water Act is flexible in that it defers regulation of fracturing and drilling to the state. According to an industry-funded study, since most states currently have regulations on fracturing, they would most likely agree with the state's policy and there would not be much change.

== Current status ==
The 111th United States Congress adjourned on January 3, 2011, without taking any significant action on the FRAC Act. The bill was re-introduced in both houses of the 112th United States Congress. In the Senate, Sen. Bob Casey (D-PA) introduced S. 587 on March 15, 2011. In the House, Rep. Diana DeGette (D-CO) introduced H.R. 1084 on March 24, 2011. The FRAC Act was reintroduced by Senator Casey to the 113th United States Congress as S. 1135 on Jun 11, 2013 and again as S. 785 on March 18, 2015, to the 114th United States Congress

Another FRAC Act bill was introduced in the 115th United States Congress by Senator Casey on April 6, 2017, as S. 865.

== See also ==
- Hydraulic fracturing in the United States
- Environmental impact of hydraulic fracturing in the United States
- Proppants and fracking fluids
