= Wattenberg Gas Field =

Gas field in Denver Basin, USA

Coordinates: 40.229°N 104.604°W

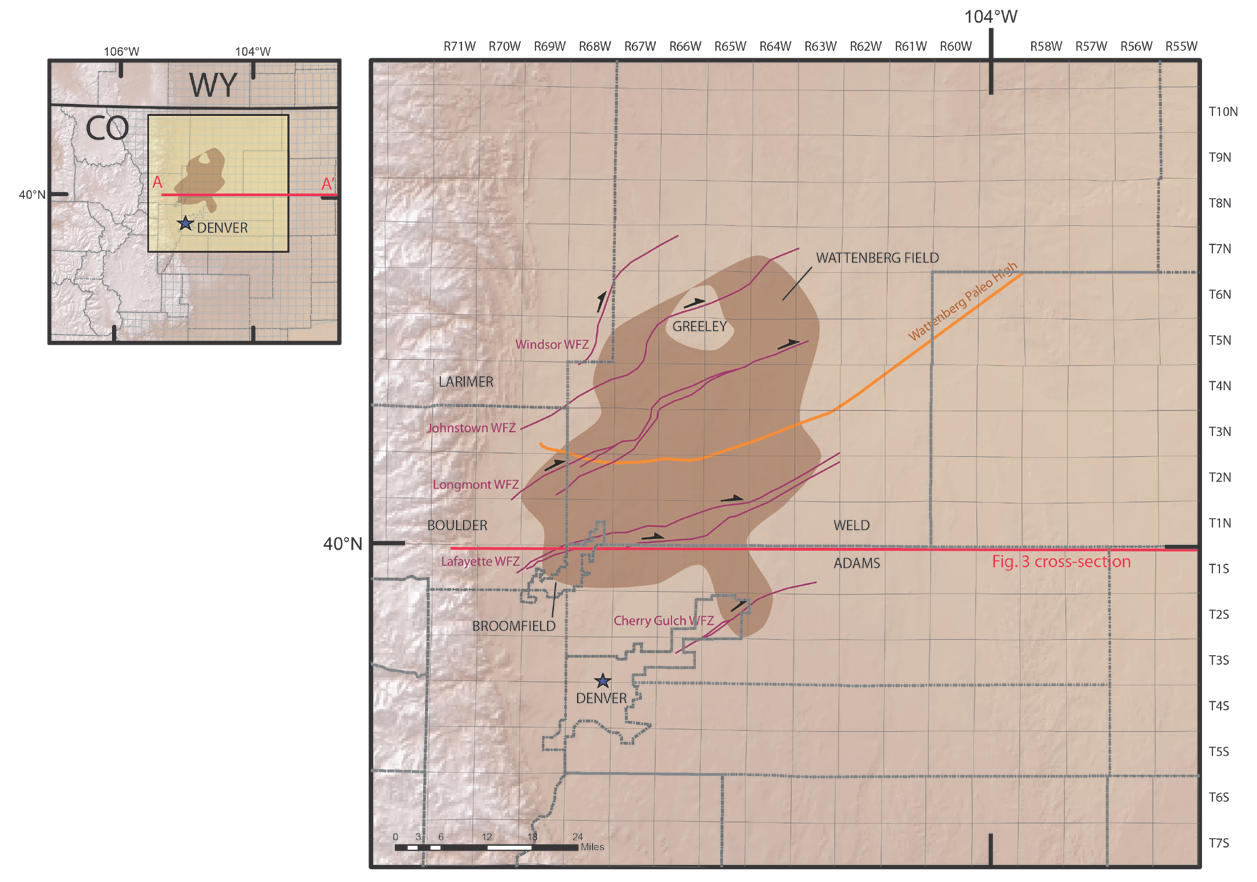
Location of the Wattenberg Gas Field, Colorado

The Wattenberg Gas Field is a large producing area of natural gas and condensate in the Denver Basin of central Colorado, USA. Discovered in 1970, the field was one of the first places where massive hydraulic fracturing was performed routinely and successfully on thousands of wells. The field now covers more than 2,000 square miles between the cities of Denver and Greeley, and includes more than 23,000 wells producing from a number of Cretaceous formations. The bulk of the field is in Weld County, but it extends into Adams, Boulder, Broomfield, Denver, and Larimer Counties.

== Geology ==
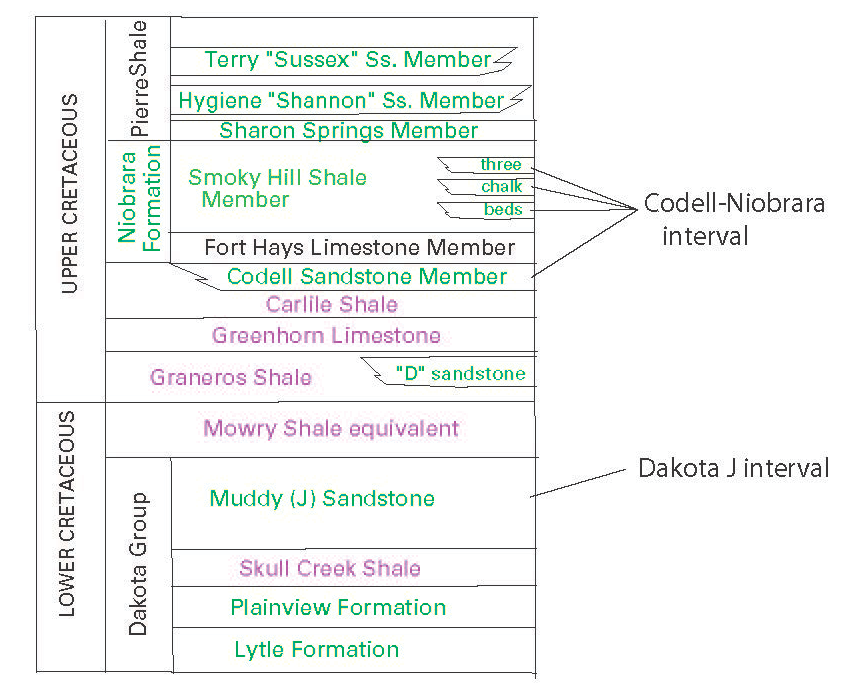
Stratigraphic column of the Wattenberg Gas Field. Oil and gas producing zones are in green; hydrocarbon source beds are in purple.

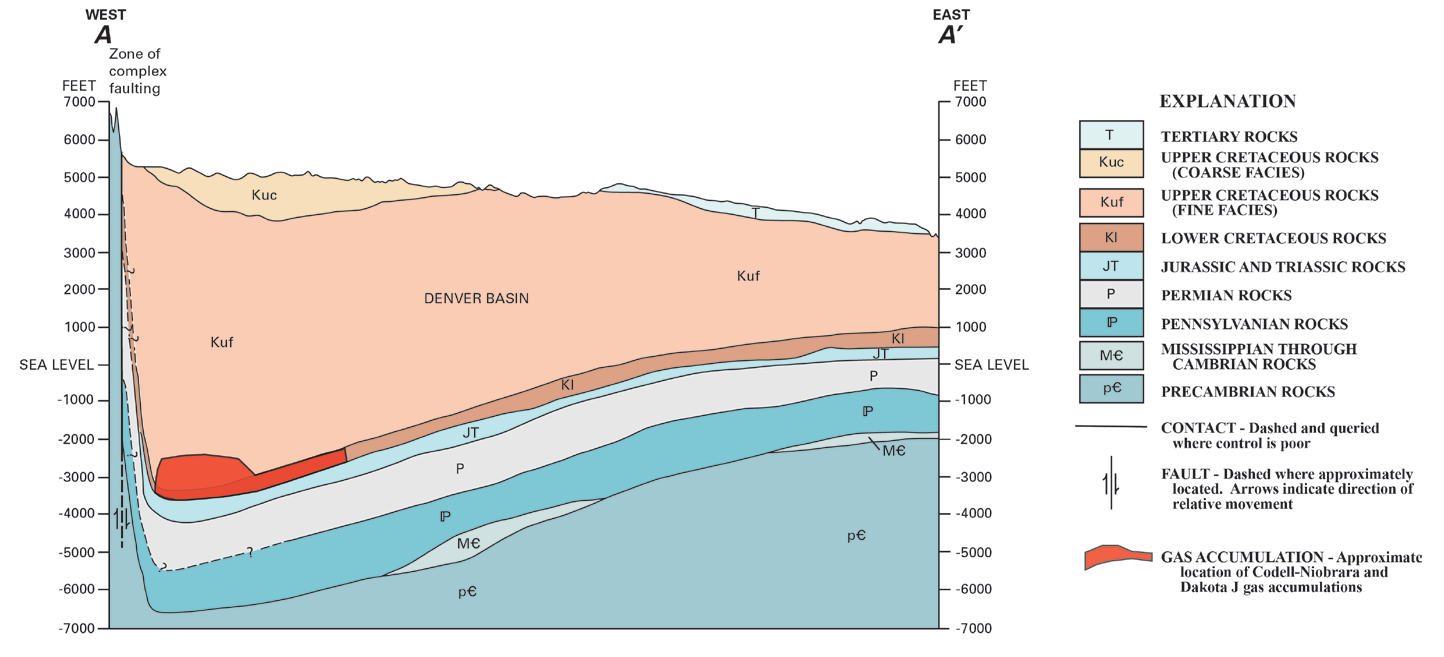
East-West cross-section through the Denver Basin. The Wattenberg basin-centered field is shown in red.

The reservoir rocks are Cretaceous sandstones, shales, and limestones deposited under marine conditions in the Western Interior Seaway.

The gas and condensate is contained within Cretaceous formations in the deepest part of the Denver Basin, where the rocks were subject to enough heat and pressure to generate oil and gas from organic material in the rock. The field is a stratigraphic trap, basin-centered gas field. Most of the gas-producing formations are considered tight gas, having low natural permeability. Although the field today is in the deepest part of the basin, an unconformity at the base of the Pierre Shale shows that the field is on an early paleohigh active in the Middle Cretaceous.

== Discovery and development ==
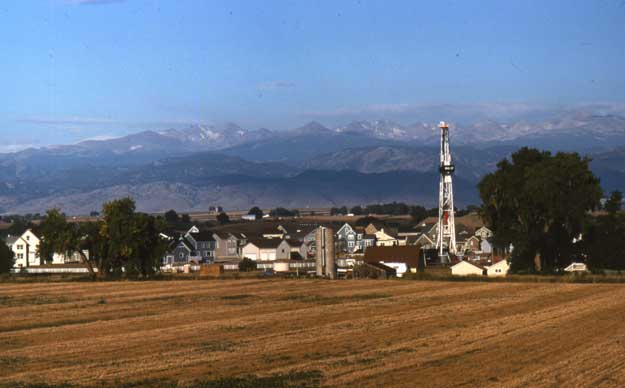
Drilling in the Wattenberg Gas Field north of Denver, 2005.

Although numerous wells had drilled through the Wattenberg Field over the decades, and many drillers and wellsite geologists noticed gas “shows” (indications) in the "J" Sandstone and other strata, the "J" Sandstone and other gas-bearing formations had permeability too low to yield gas in commercial quantities. Core samples indicated the "J" Sandstone was similar to the Lower Cretaceous Dakota Sandstone reservoir in the San Juan Basin. This was supported with the Aug. 1967 discovery of the Roundup Field. Additionally, examination of outcrops and electrical logs showed the "J" Sandstone to be a delta-front sandstone.

Amoco geologist Pete Matuszczak noticed that all the wells drilled over a large area recorded noncommercial gas shows, with no water, through the "J" Sandsone (also called the Muddy Sandstone) on the mudlogs, cores, and drillstem tests. He suggested that the area might be made to produce large economic quantities if the wells were treated with the new method of massive hydraulic fracturing, which Amoco was using successfully in the San Juan Basin of New Mexico.

Drilling started in 1970, and wells were completed in the J Sandstone, at depths from 7350 to 8500 feet. Drilling deep gas also fortuitously found conventional oil in places in the shallower Terry and Hygiene sandstones. The D Sandstone, another conventional reservoir, also produces in limited areas within Wattenberg.

Additional producing formations were added to the field. Starting in 1981, operators discovered that the Codell Sandstone would yield economic quantities of oil and gas if hydraulically fractured. Hundreds of new wells were drilled and completed in the Codell in the early 1980s; the Codell was often co-completed with the overlying Niobrara Formation. Additional wells were drilled and hydraulically fractured in the Plainview and Lytle formations, below the J Sandstone.

The initial spacing of one "J" Sandstone well per 320 acres was found insufficient to drain the reservoir, so the Colorado Oil and Gas Conservation Commission approved infill wells.

Gas wells in Wattenberg were drilled vertically until 2009, when operators discovered that horizontal wells drilled in the chalk of the Niobrara Formation yielded better quantities of gas and condensate, setting off a new round of drilling.

== Production and reserves ==
In 1973, the field was thought to contain 1.1 trillion cubic feet of recoverable gas. Through 2008, the Wattenberg Field had produced 2.8 trillion cubic feet of gas, and an estimated 5.2 trillion cubic feet of recoverable gas remained. In 2013, the US Energy Information Administration listed Wattenberg as the 9th largest gas field in the US in terms of remaining proved gas reserves, 4th in remaining proved oil/condensate reserves. As of March 2018, the field was producing 1.92 billion cubic feet of gas and 331 thousand barrels of oil and condensate per day, from more than 23,000 active wells.

More than 40 companies operate wells in Wattenberg. As of 2017, the five largest producers of oil and gas in the field were: Kerr-McGee, Noble Energy, PDC Energy, Extraction Oil and Gas, and SRC Energy. Together, the top five producing companies produced 84 percent of the total gas produced in 2017.
