= The FracTracker Alliance =

FracTracker Alliance
- Formation: 2012
- Legal status: 501(c)(3) nonprofit
- Headquarters: Camp Hill, Pennsylvania
- Region served: United States
- President: John R. Dawes
- Main organ: Board of Directors
- Website: FracTracker.org

FracTracker Alliance is a 501(c)(3) non-profit that shares maps, images, data, and analysis related to the oil and gas industry hoping that a better informed public will be able to make better informed decisions regarding the world's energy future. FracTracker's information is focused in large part on unconventional extraction methods. FracTracker Alliance is based in Pennsylvania and has several remote offices across the United States.

== History ==
FracTracker Alliance originated as FracTracker.org, a project of the Center for Healthy Environments and Communities at the University of Pittsburgh Graduate School of Public Health with the objective of crowd-sourcing data concerning unconventional gas extraction from the Marcellus Shale. Between 2010 and early 2012, FracTracker was funded by grants from The Heinz Endowments and The William Penn Foundation.

FracTracker.org's original director, Dr. Volz, left the University of Pittsburgh in April 2011. Soon after Dr. Volz left the University, FracTracker.org split off from the University as well (in early 2012), and formed a new non-profit named The FracTracker Alliance. Many members of the original team from the University of Pittsburgh who had been working on FracTracker.org left the University to work for the new non-profit as (or shortly after) it was created.

== Current Initiatives ==
=== Mapping ===
FracTracker Alliance is known for its mapping of energy issues. FracTracker offers a variety of maps detailing drilling-related activity, and more recently renewable energy progress on its website. FracTracker's data comes from a variety of sources including state environmental agencies, news reports, freedom of information requests, user reports, collaborations with other groups, and information from other agencies. FracTracker makes its data available for download, and makes clear where the data came from by including a variety of metadata along with its data (e.g. information about who created the original content, what is included in the dataset, when the dataset was taken, where the data features were located, and information about any changes from the original dataset). FracTracker.org also offers regular in-person trainings about how to use their mapping tools.

FracTracker.org originally used a proprietary mapping system designed by Rhiza Labs in Pittsburgh, but transitioned to a customized mapping platform based on Esri's ARCGis Online that allows users to download full datasets both through FracTracker and through Esri.

=== Fee-for-service ===
FracTracker Alliance collaborates with many other nonprofit organizations, providing them with visualizations and information that help them communicate about energy choices and their impacts. These services are typically provided on a pro-bono basis, but for larger projects they apply a fee-for-service structure.

== See also ==
- GIS
- Crowdsourcing
- Marcellus Shale
- Hydraulic Fracturing
- Public Health
- Environmental Health
