= Tight gas =

Natural gas produced from reservoir rocks

An illustration of tight gas compared to other types of gas deposits.

Tight gas is commonly used to refer to natural gas produced from reservoir rocks with such low permeability that massive hydraulic fracturing is necessary to produce the well at economic rates. The gas is sealed in very impermeable and hard rocks, making their formation "tight". These impermeable reservoirs which produce dry natural gas are also called "Tight Sand".

In reality the term "tight" refers to reservoirs where wells are unable to be commercially exploited at current economic conditions in the absence of artificial stimulation or changes in well geometry. It is economic criteria (gas price, opex, capex, royalties and fiscal regime) which define this status and in many cases, as gas/oil prices rise then, projects that have been previously shelved become viable; improvements in technology or changes in available infrastructure may also rehabilitate otherwise stranded gas.

Tight gas reservoirs historically were generally defined as having less than 0.1 millidarcy (mD) matrix permeability and less than ten percent matrix porosity. Although shales have low permeability and low effective porosity, shale gas is usually considered separate from tight gas, which is contained most commonly in sandstone, but sometimes in limestone. Tight gas is considered an unconventional source of natural gas.

Much tight gas was formed 248 million years ago in Paleozoic formations. Cementation and recrystallization changed a conventional gas reserve which reduced the permeability of the rock and natural gas was trapped within these rock formations. Horizontal and directional drilling is used to extract tight gas deposits as they run along the formation which in turn allows more natural gas to enter the well that was dug.

Numerous wells can be drilled to access the gas. Hydraulic fracturing is one of the main methods to access the gas which requires breaking apart the rocks in the formation by pumping fracking fluids in to the wells. This increases permeability and allows gas to flow easily, freeing it from the trap. After that deliquifaction is used to help in the extraction.

Rock with permeabilities as little as one nanodarcy, reservoir stimulation may be economically productive with optimized spacing and completion of staged fractures to maximize yield concerning cost.

== Examples ==
Some examples of tight gas reservoirs are:

- Muddy Sandstone/J Sandstone – Wattenberg Gas Field, Denver Basin, Colorado, US
- Mesaverde Group – Piceance Basin, Colorado, US
- Rotliegend – Germany and Netherlands
- Utica – Appalachian Basin, US & Canada

== See also ==
- Unconventional (oil & gas) reservoir
- Shale gas
- Tight oil
