= C22H14 =

The molecular formula C_{22}H_{14} (molar mass: 278.36 g/mol) may refer to:

- Dibenz[a,h]anthracene
- Dibenz[a,j]anthracene
- Pentacene
- Pentaphene
- Picene
