= Nutrient pollution =

Contamination of water by excessive inputs of nutrients

Nutrient pollution is a form of water pollution caused by too many nutrients entering the water. It is a primary cause of eutrophication of surface waters (lakes, rivers and coastal waters), in which excess nutrients, usually nitrogen or phosphorus, stimulate algal growth. Sources of nutrient pollution include surface runoff from farms, waste from septic tanks, feedlots, and emissions from burning fuels. Raw sewage, which is rich in nutrients, is also a contributing factor when dumped in water bodies. Excess nitrogen causes environmental problems such as harmful algal blooms, hypoxia, acid rain, nitrogen saturation in forests, and climate change.

Agricultural production relies heavily on the use of natural and synthetic fertilizers. These often contain high levels of nitrogen, phosphorus and potassium. When nitrogen and phosphorus are not fully used by the growing plants, they are lost from the farm fields and negatively impact air and downstream water quality. These nutrients can end up in aquatic ecosystems and contribute to increased eutrophication. Meaning the water is too nutirent rich.

To reduce nutrient pollution, several strategies can be implemented. These include installing buffer zones of vegetation around farms or artificial wetlands to absorb excess nutrients. Additionally, better wastewater treatment and reducing sewage dumping can help limit nutrient discharge into water systems. Finally, countries can create a permit system under the polluter pays principle.

== Sources ==
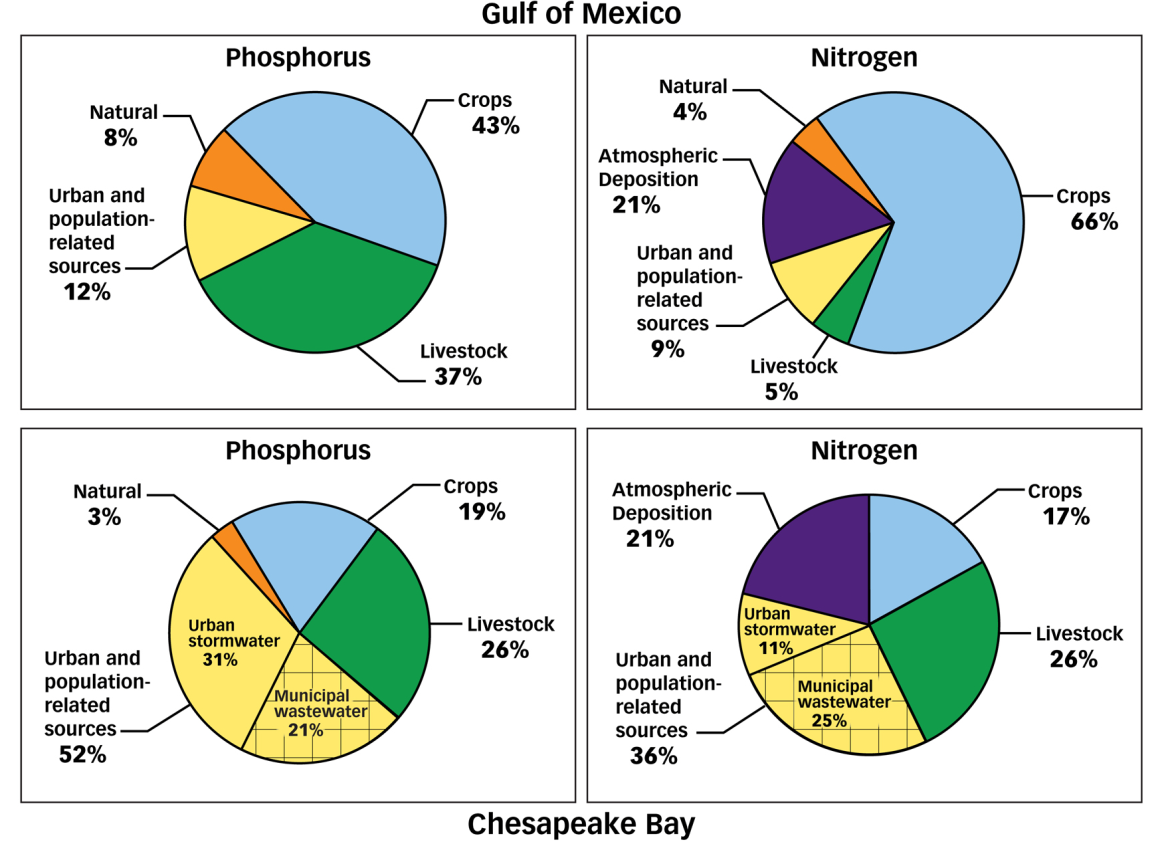
Agriculture is the major source of nutrient pollution in the Gulf of Mexico. In the Chesapeake Bay, agriculture is a major source, along with urban areas and atmospheric deposition.

Mean eutrophying emissions (measured as phosphate equivalents) of different foods
Food types	Eutrophying emissions (g PO_{4}^{3-}eq per 100g protein)
Beef	365.3
Farmed fish	235.1
Farmed crustaceans	227.2
Cheese	98.4
Lamb and mutton	97.1
Pork	76.4
Poultry	48.7
Eggs	21.8
Groundnuts	14.1
Peas	7.5
Tofu	6.2

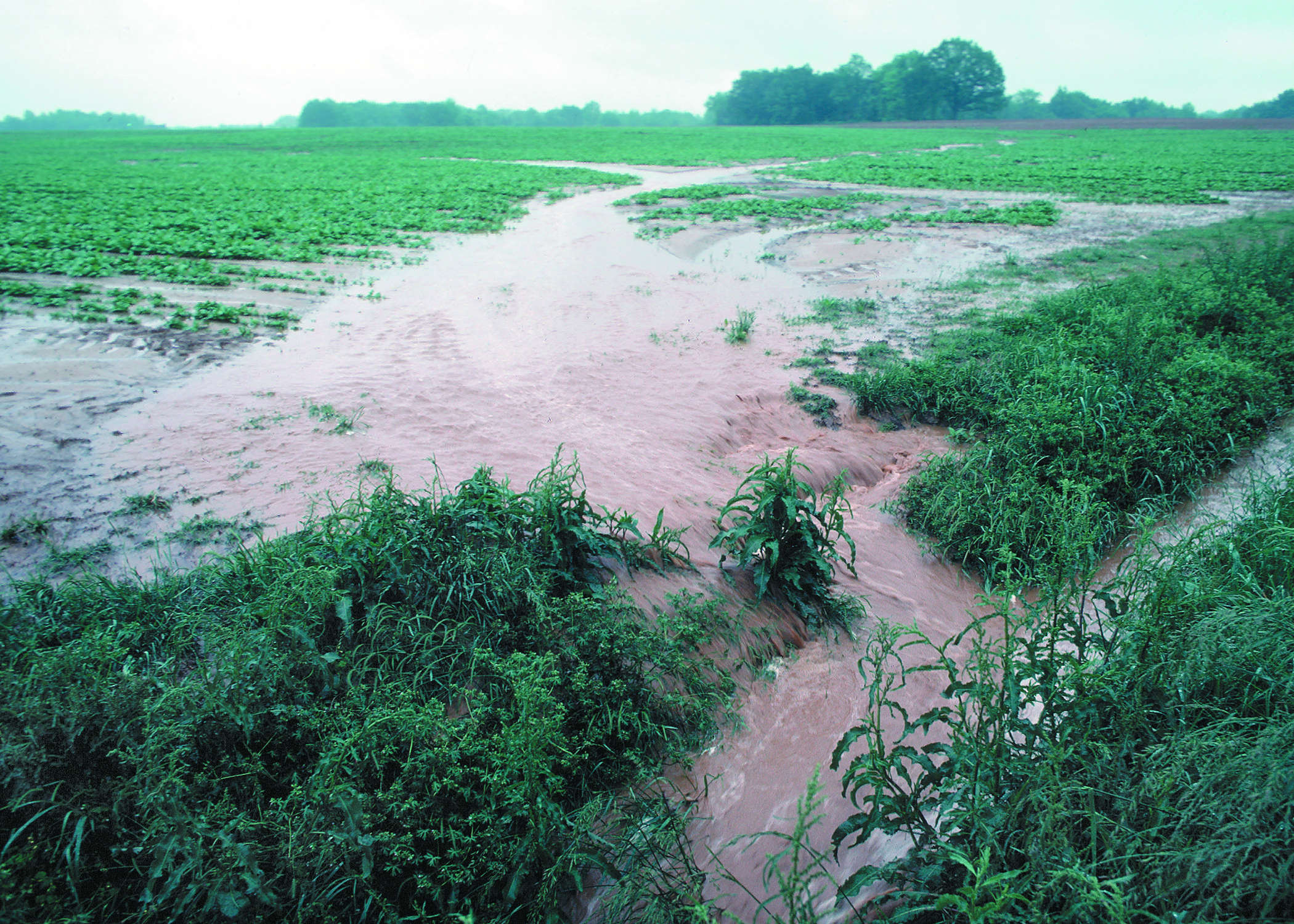
Nutrient pollution caused by Surface runoff of soil and fertilizer during rain. Here in Tennessee.

The principal source(s) of nutrient pollution in an individual watershed depend on the prevailing land uses. The sources may be point sources, nonpoint sources, or both:

- Agriculture: animal production or crops
- Urban/suburban: stormwater runoff from roads and parking lots; excessive fertilizer use on lawns; municipal sewage treatment plants; motor vehicle emissions.
- Industrial: air pollution emissions (e.g. electric power plants), wastewater discharges from various industries.

Nutrient pollution from some air pollution sources may occur independently of the local land uses, due to long-range transport of air pollutants from distant sources.

In order to gauge how to best prevent eutrophication from occurring, specific sources that contribute to nutrient loading must be identified. There are two common sources of nutrients and organic matter: point and nonpoint sources.

=== Nitrogen ===
Use of synthetic fertilizers, burning of fossil fuels, and agricultural animal production, especially concentrated animal feeding operations (CAFO), have added large quantities of reactive nitrogen to the biosphere. Globally, nitrogen balances are quite inefficiently distributed with some countries having surpluses and others deficits, causing especially a range of environmental issues in places with a surplus. For most countries around the world, the trade-off between closing yield gaps and mitigating nitrogen pollution is small or non-existent.

=== Phosphorus ===
Phosphorus pollution is caused by excessive use of fertilizers and manure.Particularly when compounded by soil erosion. In the European Union, it is estimated that we may lose more than 100,000 metric tons of phosphorus to water bodies and lakes due to water erosion. Phosphorus is also discharged by municipal sewage treatment plants and some industries.

=== Point sources ===
Point sources are sources that directly attributable to one influence. In point sources the nutrient waste travels directly from source to water. Point sources are relatively easy to regulate.

=== Non-point sources ===
Non-point source pollution (also known as 'diffuse' or 'runoff' pollution) is from ill-defined and diffuse sources. Non-point sources are difficult to regulate and usually vary spatially and temporally (with season, precipitation, and other irregular events).

It has been shown that nitrogen transport is correlated with various indices of human activity in watersheds, including the amount of human development. Ploughing in agriculture and development are among activities that contribute most to nutrient loading.

=== Soil retention ===
Nutrients from human activities tend to accumulate in soils and remain there for years. It has been shown that the amount of phosphorus lost to surface waters increases linearly with the amount of phosphorus in the soil. Thus much of the nutrient loading in soil eventually makes its way to water. Nitrogen, similarly, has a turnover time of decades. This means that the nutrients remain in the soil for a prolonged period of time.

=== Runoff to surface water ===
Nutrients from human activities tend to travel from land to surface or ground water. Nitrogen in particular is removed through storm drains, sewage pipes, and other forms of filtration. Nutrient losses in runoff and leachate are often caused by agriculture. Modern agriculture often involves the application of nutrients onto fields in order to maximize production and crop yield. However, farmers frequently apply more nutrients than are needed by crops. This is what causes so much excess pollution running off into surface and ground water. Regulations aimed at minimizing nutrient exports from agriculture are typically far less stringent than those placed on sewage treatment plants, or other point source polluters. It should be also noted that lakes within forested land are also under surface runoff influences. Runoff can wash out the mineral nitrogen and phosphorus from detritus and in consequence supply the water bodies leading to slow, natural eutrophication.

=== Atmospheric deposition ===
Nitrogen is released into the air because of ammonia volatilization and nitrous oxide production. The combustion of fossil fuels is a large human-initiated contributor to atmospheric nitrogen pollution. Atmospheric nitrogen reaches the ground by two different processes. The first being wet deposition such as rain or snow. There is also dry deposition which is particles and gases found in the air. Atmospheric deposition (e.g., in the form of acid rain) can also affect nutrient concentration in water, especially in highly industrialized regions.

=== Farming effects ===
Farmers are often forced to use fertilizers containing phosphorus in order to maintain production. Though, there may be economic pressure to produce that pressures them into the overuse of fertilizers. Interestingly not all of the nutrients given to plants via fertilizers is taken in by the plans. This is when the chemicals will turn into runoff with rain water. It will also seep into the ground and contaminate groundwater.

== Impacts ==
=== Environmental and economic impacts ===
(Add more in depth paragraphs for the impacts of nutrient pollution rather than bullet points)

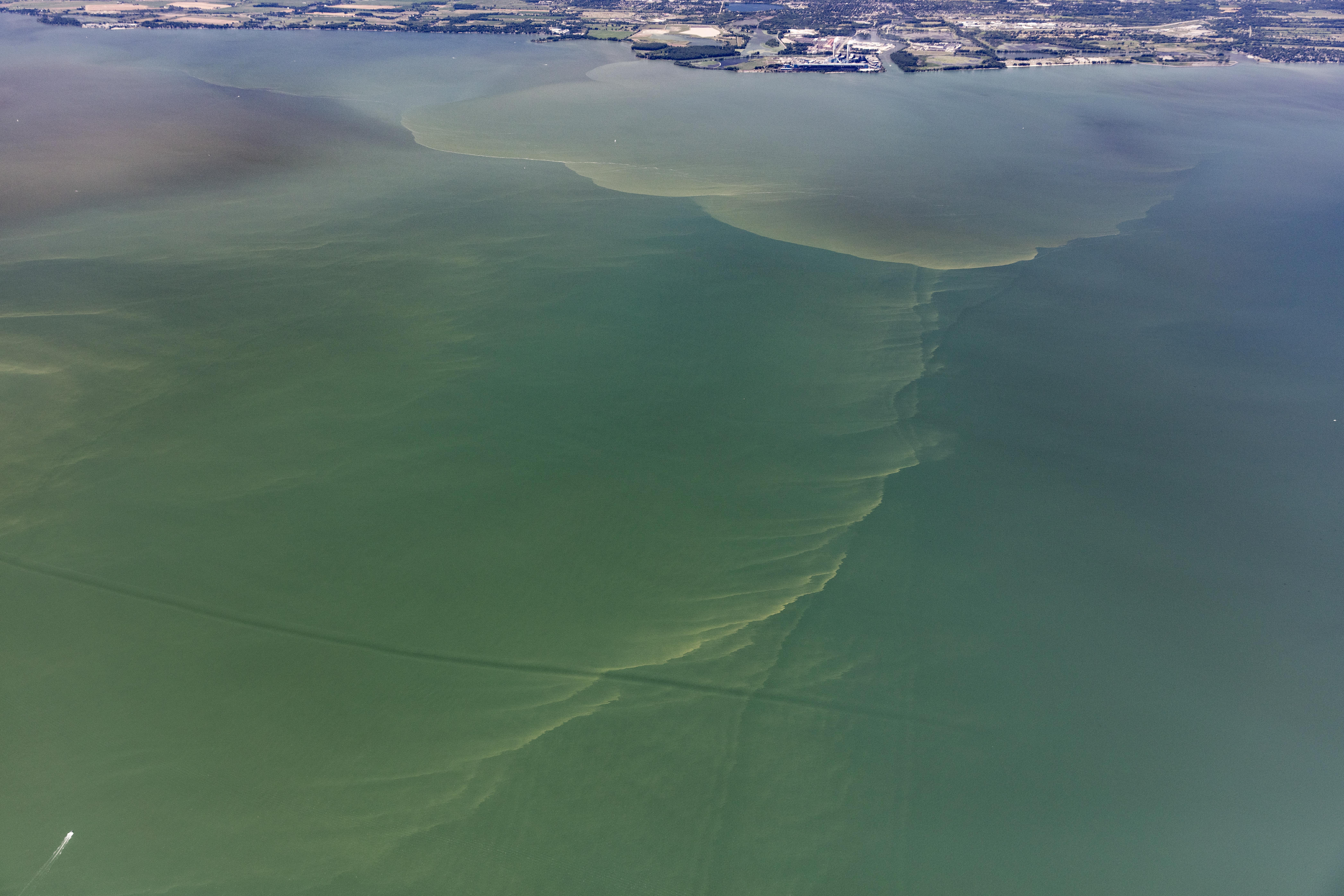
Harmful algal bloom in Western Lake Erie on July 9, 2018

Excess nutrients have been summarized as potentially leading to:

=== Excess growth of algae (harmful algal blooms); and biodiversity loss ===
Too much harmful algae blooms are referred to as 'red tide'. This is when algae overgrowth is so significant that it results in deoxygenated bodies of water. This had harmful effects on the population of marine life and plants. These blooms can last for months. When they finally die they release harmful toxins into the water. This kills even more life, resulting in 'dead zones' where there is no life. This significantly decreases biodiversity. Not only are some species completely eradicated, but there are less organisms present in the ecosystem. Both of these factors harm biodiversity causing the ecosystem to struggle further.

=== Species composition shifts ===
It has been heavily researched that large algae blooms, a result of nutrient pollution have harmful effects on species composition. Important species to maintaining a healthy ecosystem are the microbial community. It has been research and found that different phases of these aggressive allege blooms have an effect on the survival of these important spices. This is yet another harmful effect on the ecosystem that is a result of nutrient pollution, the effects domino.

- Food web changes, light limitation;
- Excess organic carbon (eutrophication); dissolved oxygen deficits (environmental hypoxia); toxin production;

Nutrient pollution can have economic impacts due to increasing water treatment costs, commercial fishing, shellfish losses, recreational fishing losses, and reduced tourism income.

=== Health impacts ===
Human health effects include excess nitrate in drinking water (blue baby syndrome) and disinfection by-products in drinking water. Swimming in water affected by a harmful algal bloom can cause skin rashes and respiratory problems.

== Reducing nutrient pollution ==
=== Nutrient trading ===
Nutrient trading is a type of water quality trading, a market-based policy instrument used to improve or maintain water quality. The concept of water quality trading is based on the fact that different pollution sources in a watershed can face very different costs to control the same pollutant. Water quality trading involves the voluntary exchange of pollution reduction credits from sources with low costs of pollution control to those with high costs of pollution control, and the same principles apply to nutrient water quality trading. The underlying principle is "polluter pays", usually linked with a regulatory requirement for participating in the trading program.

A 2013 Forest Trends report summarized water quality trading programs and found three main types of funders: beneficiaries of watershed protection, polluters compensating for their impacts and "public good payers" that may not directly benefit, but fund the pollution reduction credits on behalf of a government or NGO. As of 2013, payments were overwhelmingly initiated by public good payers like governments and NGOs.

=== Nutrient source apportionment ===
Nutrient source apportionment is used to estimate the nutrient load from various sectors entering water bodies, following attenuation or treatment. Agriculture is typically the principal source of nitrogen in water bodies in Europe, whereas in many countries households and industries tend to be the dominant contributors of phosphorus. Where water quality is impacted by excess nutrients, load source apportionment models can support the proportional and pragmatic management of water resources by identifying the pollution sources. There are two broad approaches to load apportionment modelling, (i) load-orientated approaches which apportion origin based on in-stream monitoring data and (ii) source-orientated approaches where amounts of diffuse, or nonpoint source pollution, emissions are calculated using models typically based on export coefficients from catchments with similar characteristics. For example, the Source Load Apportionment Model (SLAM) takes the latter approach, estimating the relative contribution of sources of nitrogen and phosphorus to surface waters in Irish catchments without in-stream monitoring data by integrating information on point discharges (urban wastewater, industry and septic tank systems), diffuse sources (pasture, arable, forestry, etc.), and catchment data, including hydrogeological characteristics.

=== Nature-based solutions ===
Various nature-based solutions exist to tackle nutrient solution. For instance, farms can create artificial wetlands, which help remove nutrient run-off. These can also have a waterbody included. Farms can also create buffer zones, to capture nutrients in groundwater or run-off. Finally, by vegetating drainage ditches, there is another opportunity for excess nutrients to be captured.

== Country examples ==
=== United States ===
Based on surveys by state environmental agencies, agricultural nonpoint source (NPS) pollution is the largest source of water quality impairments throughout the U.S. NPS pollution is not subject to discharge permits under the federal Clean Water Act (CWA). EPA and states have used grants, partnerships and demonstration projects to create incentives for farmers to adjust their practices and reduce surface runoff.

==== Development of nutrient policy ====
The basic requirements for states to develop nutrient criteria and standards were mandated in the 1972 Clean Water Act. Implementing this water quality program has been a major scientific, technical and resource-intensive challenge for both EPA and the states, and development is continuing well into the 21st century.

EPA published a wastewater management regulation in 1978 to address the national nitrogen pollution problem, which had been increasing for decades. In 1998, the agency published a National Nutrient Strategy with a focus on developing nutrient criteria.

Between 2000 and 2010, the EPA published federal-level nutrient criteria for rivers/streams, lakes/reservoirs, estuaries, wetlands and related guidance. "Ecoregional" nutrient criteria for 14 ecoregions across the U.S. were included in these publications. While states may directly adopt the EPA-published criteria, the states need to modify the criteria to reflect site-specific conditions in many cases. In 2004, EPA stated its expectations for numeric criteria (as opposed to less-specific narrative criteria) for total nitrogen (TN), total phosphorus (TP), chlorophyll a(chl-a), and clarity, and established "mutually-agreed upon plans" for state criteria development. In 2007, the agency stated that progress among the states on developing nutrient criteria had been uneven. EPA reiterated its expectations for numeric criteria and promised support for state efforts to develop their criteria.

After the EPA had introduced watershed-based NPDES permitting in 2007, interest in nutrient removal and achieving regional Total Maximum Daily Load (TMDL) limitations led to the development of nutrient trading schemes.

In 2008, the EPA published a progress report on state efforts to develop nutrient standards. Most states had not developed numeric nutrient criteria for rivers and streams; lakes and reservoirs, wetlands and estuaries (for those states with estuaries). In the same year, EPA also established a Nutrient Innovations Task Group (NITG), composed of state and EPA experts, to monitor and evaluate the progress of reducing nutrient pollution. In 2009 the NTIG issued a report, "An Urgent Call to Action", expressing concern that water quality continued to deteriorate nationwide due to increasing nutrient pollution, and recommending more vigorous development of nutrient standards by the states.

In 2011 EPA reiterated the need for states to fully develop their nutrient standards, noting that drinking water violations for nitrates had doubled in eight years. Half of all streams nationwide had medium to high levels of nitrogen and phosphorus, and harmful algal blooms were increasing. The agency set out a framework for states to develop priorities and watershed-level goals for reductions of nutrients.

==== Discharge permits ====
Many point source dischargers in the U.S., while not necessarily the largest sources of nutrients in their respective watersheds, are required to comply with nutrient effluent limitations in their permits, which are issued through the National Pollutant Discharge Elimination System (NPDES), under the CWA. Some large municipal sewage treatment plants, such as the Blue Plains Advanced Wastewater Treatment Plant in Washington, D.C. have installed biological nutrient removal (BNR) systems to comply with regulatory requirements. Other municipalities have made adjustments to the operational practices of their existing secondary treatment systems to control nutrients.

NPDES permits also regulate discharges from large livestock facilities (CAFO). Surface runoff from farm fields, the principal source of nutrients in many watersheds, is classified as NPS pollution and is not regulated by NPDES permits.

==== TMDL program ====
A Total Maximum Daily Load (TMDL) is a regulatory plan that prescribes the maximum amount of a pollutant (including nutrients) that a body of water can receive while still meeting CWA water quality standards. Specifically, Section 303 of the Act requires each state to generate a TMDL report for each body of water impaired by pollutants. TMDL reports identify pollutant levels and strategies to accomplish pollutant reduction goals. EPA has described TMDLs as establishing a "pollutant budget" with allocations to each pollutant source. For many coastal water bodies, the main pollutant issue is excess nutrients, also termed nutrient over-enrichment.

A TMDL can prescribe the minimum level of dissolved oxygen (DO) available in a body of water, which is directly related to nutrient levels. (See Aquatic Hypoxia.) TMDLs addressing nutrient pollution are a major component of the U.S. National Nutrient Strategy. TMDLs identify all point source and nonpoint source pollutants within a watershed. Wasteload allocations are incorporated into their NPDES permits to implement TMDLs with point sources. NPS discharges are generally in a voluntary compliance scenario.

EPA published a TMDL for the Chesapeake Bay in 2010, addressing nitrogen, phosphorus and sediment pollution for the entire watershed, covering an area of 64,000 square miles (170,000 km^{2}). This regulatory plan covers the estuary and its tributaries—the largest, most complex TMDL document that EPA has issued.

In Long Island Sound, the TMDL development process enabled the Connecticut Department of Energy and Environmental Protection and the New York State Department of Environmental Conservation to incorporate a 58.5 percent nitrogen reduction target into a regulatory and legal framework.

=== China ===
Similar to the U.S., nutrient pollution is dominant in surface water pollution in China. Urbanization and agriculture have contributed to nutrient pollution most notably, the practice of discharging of manure where animal manure is treated as waste and is discharged into water. Surveys and models have also shown that Nitrogen and Phosphorus inputs to rivers are high in southern and eastern regions of China.

== See also ==
- Agricultural wastewater treatment
