= Nonpoint source =

Nonpoint source, or non-point source, or NPS, is a source that does not come from a single point.

- Point source, contrasts with nonpoint source
- Nonpoint source pollution, water pollution
- Nonpoint source water pollution regulations, water pollution regulations

== See also ==
- Nonpoint
