= Effluent =

Liquid waste or sewage discharged into a river or the sea

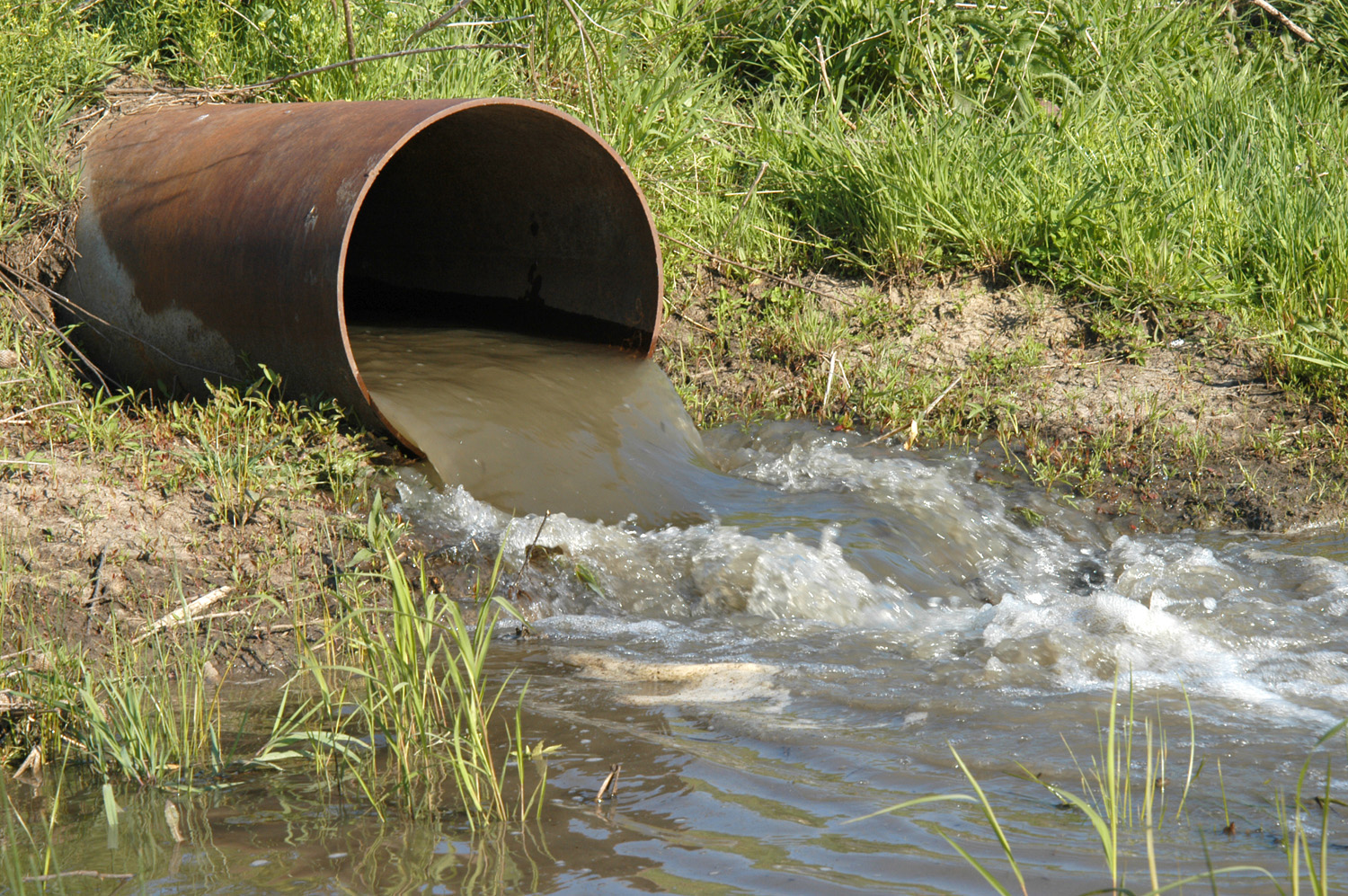
Wastewater is considered effluent as it is released to surface water.

Effluent is wastewater from sewers or industrial outfalls that flows directly into surface waters, either untreated or after being treated at a facility. The term has slightly different meanings in certain contexts, and may contain various pollutants depending on the source.

== Definition ==
Effluent is defined by the United States Environmental Protection Agency (EPA) as "wastewater–treated or untreated–that flows out of a treatment plant, sewer, or industrial outfall. Generally refers to wastes discharged into surface waters". The Compact Oxford English Dictionary defines effluent as "liquid waste or sewage discharged into a river or the sea". Wastewater is not usually described as effluent while being recycled, re-used, or treated until it is released to surface water. Wastewater percolated or injected into groundwater may not be described as effluent if soil is assumed to perform treatment by filtration or ion exchange; although concealed flow through fractured bedrock, lava tubes, limestone caves, or gravel in ancient stream channels may allow relatively untreated wastewater to emerge as springs.

== Description ==
Effluent in the artificial sense is in general considered to be water pollution, such as the outflow from a sewage treatment facility or an industrial wastewater discharge. An effluent sump pump, for instance, pumps waste from toilets installed below a main sewage line. In the context of waste water treatment plants, effluent that has been treated is sometimes called secondary effluent, or treated effluent. This cleaner effluent is then used to feed the bacteria in biofilters.

In the context of a thermal power station and other industrial facilities, the output of the cooling system may be referred to as the effluent cooling water, which is noticeably warmer than the environment and is called thermal pollution. In chemical engineering practice, effluent is the stream exiting a chemical reactor.

Effluent may carry pollutants such as fats, oils and greases; solvents, detergents and other chemicals; heavy metals; other solids; and food waste. Possible sources include a wide range of manufacturing industries, mining industries, oil and gas extraction, and service industries.

== Treatment ==
There are several kinds of wastewater which are treated at the appropriate type of treatment plant. Domestic wastewater (also called municipal wastewater or sewage) is processed at a sewage treatment plant. For industrial wastewater, treatment either takes place in a separate industrial wastewater treatment facility, or in a sewage treatment plant (usually after some form of pre-treatment). Other types of wastewater treatment plants include agricultural wastewater treatment and leachate treatment plants.

Treating wastewater efficiently is challenging, but improved technology allows for enhanced removal of specific materials, increased re-use of water, and energy production from waste.

== Pollution control regulation ==
=== United States effluent guidelines ===
In the United States, the Clean Water Act requires all direct effluent discharges to surface waters to be regulated with permits under the National Pollutant Discharge Elimination System (NPDES). Indirect dischargers–facilities which send their wastewater to municipal sewage treatment plants–may be subject to pretreatment requirements. NPDES permits require discharging facilities to limit or treat effluent to the levels that result from using the most effective treatment technologies possible at a practical cost to mitigate the effects of discharges on the receiving waters. EPA has published technology-based regulations, called "effluent guidelines", for 59 industrial categories. The agency reviews the standards annually, conducts research on various categories, and makes revisions as appropriate. Noncompliance with these standards and all other conditions in the permits is punishable by law. Each year, effluent guidelines regulations prevent billions of pounds of contaminants from being released into bodies of water.

EPA regulations require effluent limitations to be expressed as mass-based limits (rather than concentration-based limits) in the permits, so that discharging facilities will not use dilution as a substitute for treatment. In cases where setting mass-based limits are infeasible, the permit authority must set conditions in the permit that prohibit dilution.

=== United States sewage treatment standards ===
The U.S. "Secondary Treatment Regulation" is the national standard for municipal sewage treatment plants.

== See also ==
- Agricultural wastewater treatment
- Effluent guidelines (U.S. wastewater regulations)
- Effluent limitation
- Industrial wastewater treatment
- Stormwater
- Surface runoff
