= Nonpoint source water pollution regulations in the United States =

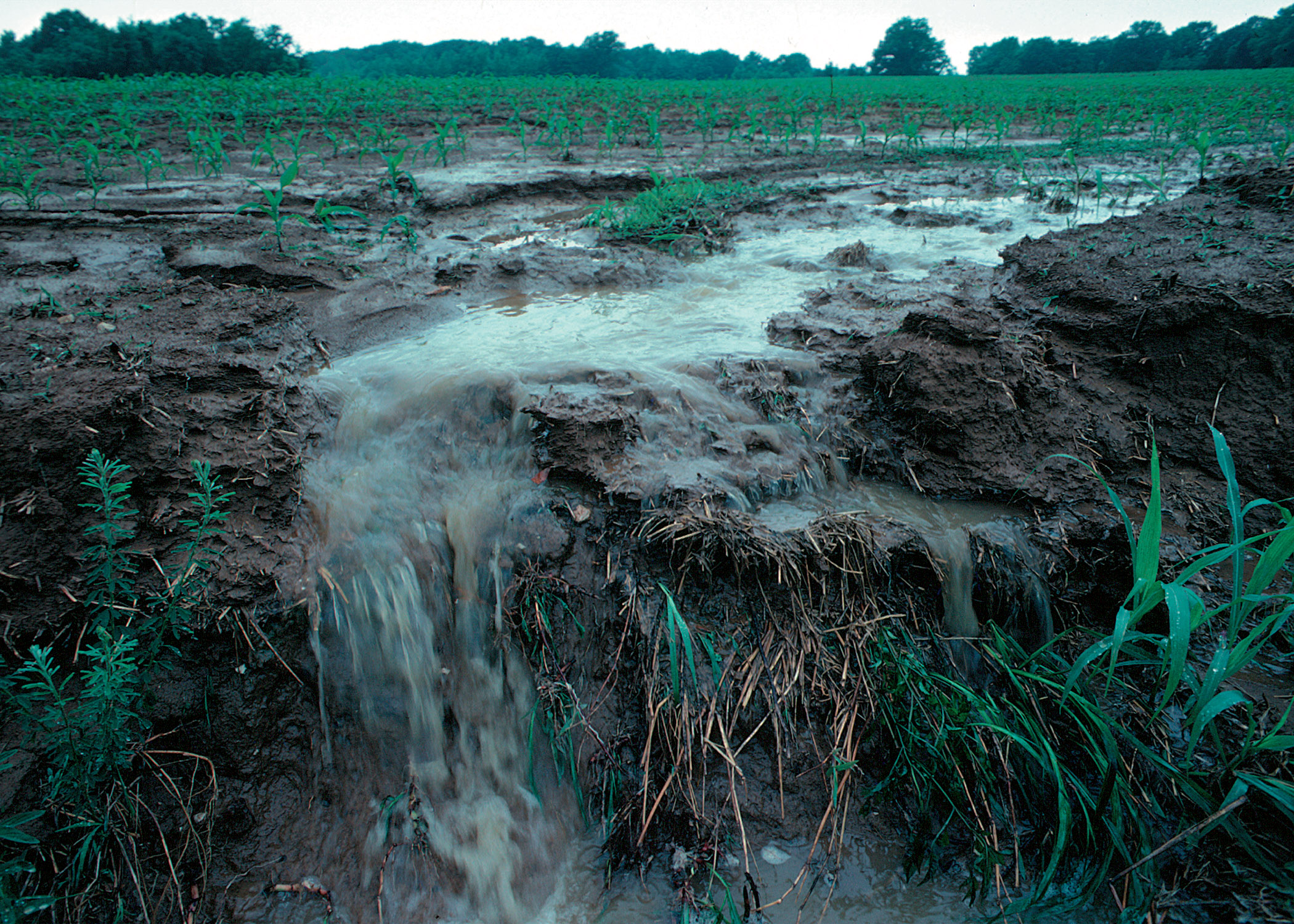
Runoff of soil and fertilizer on a farm field during a rain storm

Nonpoint source (NPS) water pollution regulations are environmental regulations that restrict or limit water pollution from diffuse or nonpoint effluent sources such as polluted runoff from agricultural areas in a river catchments or wind-borne debris blowing out to sea. In the United States, governments have taken a number of legal and regulatory approaches to controlling NPS effluent. Nonpoint water pollution sources include, for example, leakage from underground storage tanks, storm water runoff, atmospheric deposition of contaminants, and golf course, agricultural, and forestry runoff.

Nonpoint sources are the most significant single source of water pollution in the United States, accounting for almost half of all water pollution, and agricultural runoff is the single largest source of nonpoint source water pollution. This water pollution has a number of detrimental effects on human health and the environment. Unlike point source pollution, nonpoint source pollution arises from numerous and diverse sources, making identification, monitoring, and regulation more complex.

== Basis for controls and regulations ==
The basis for nonpoint source pollution regulation is the negative direct and indirect effects on both human health and the environment caused by the pollutants in NPS effluent.

=== Human health ===
Human health is most directly affected when polluted water is ingested into the body. Nonpoint source pollution can often have toxic contaminants and chemicals present in the water. Additionally, there can be both bacteria and viruses (aka pathogens) found in the water.

==== Toxic contaminants and chemicals ====
Effluent from nonpoint sources may include toxic contaminates and chemical compounds including heavy metals like lead, mercury, zinc, and cadmium, organics like polychlorinated biphenyls (PCBs) and polycyclic aromatic hydrocarbons (PAHs), and other substances resistant to breakdown. There are many health effects associated with many of these toxic substances.

- Lead – can cause damage to the nervous connections as well as blood and brain disorders. Specific diseases include nephropathy, colic-like abdominal pains, and anemia.
- Mercury – Studies have shown effects such as chronic effects including tremors, impaired cognitive skills, and sleep disturbances. Acute exposure has shown to cause chest pain, dyspnea, cough, hemoptysis, impairment of pulmonary function, and evidence of damage to the lung tissue.
- Zinc – The U.S. Food and Drug Administration (FDA) has stated that zinc damages nerve receptors in the nose, which can cause loss of the sense of smell. Additionally, zinc toxicosis can occur in high doses of zinc.
- Cadmium – Exposure to cadmium-containing substances can result initially in metal fume fever but can progress to chemical lung damage, pulmonary edema, and even death.
- PCBs – People exposed to high levels of PCBs can exhibit skin conditions, such as rashes and liver damage. Common symptoms include dermal and ocular lesions, irregular menstrual cycles and lowered immune responses. Other symptoms include fatigue, headaches, coughs, and unusual skin sores.
- PAHs – The U.S. Environmental Protection Agency (EPA) classified seven PAH compounds as probable human carcinogens: benz[a]anthracene, benzo[a]pyrene, benzo[b]fluoranthene, benzo[k]fluoranthene, chrysene, dibenz(a,h)anthracene, and indeno(1,2,3-cd)pyrene.

==== Pathogens ====
Pathogens are bacteria and viruses that can be found in water and cause diseases in humans. Pathogens found in contaminated runoff may include:

- Cryptosporidium parvum – Primary symptoms of C. parvum infection are diarrhoea. Other symptoms can include anorexia, nausea/vomiting and abdominal pain.
- Giardia lamblia – Symptoms of infection include diarrhea, malaise, excessive gas, steatorrhoea, epigastric pain, bloating, nausea, vomiting, diminished interest in food, and weight loss.
- Salmonella – Symptoms are usually gastrointestinal. This can include nausea, vomiting, abdominal cramps and bloody diarrhea with mucus, headache, and fatigue.
- Parasitic worms (helminths) – Conditions associated with intestinal helminth infection include intestinal obstruction, insomnia, vomiting, weakness, and stomach pains.

=== Environment ===
The environment is impacted by nonpoint source pollution through the input of sediment and nutrients from multiple sources directly into the water system.

==== Toxic contaminants and chemicals ====
Toxic chemicals and contaminants, like motor oil, fuel, and industrial facility waste can enter the water system by storm water runoff. These chemicals, many of which can contain heavy metals, can enter the water system and coat the species present in the water. This can lead to death of the aquatic organisms which can cause increases in the amount of nutrients in the system from the decaying animals.

==== Sediment ====
Sediment or suspended sediment in the water is soil that would not normally be present in the water column. When the sediment is suspended up in the water column, it blocks out the sunlight which is needed by bottom dwelling plants. If these plants, called submerged aquatic vegetation, are deprived of sunlight for a significant amount of time, they will die. These plants are a significant source of food for many aquatic organisms as well as trap oxygen and sediment. When there is an excess of dying plants in an aquatic ecosystem, it can lead to eutophic or hypoxic conditions in the water body.

==== Nutrients ====
The primary nutrients found in water due to nonpoint source pollution are nitrogen and phosphorus from fertilizers. An influx of these nutrients can lead to eutrophication within the water. This is when there is an excess of nutrients in water, thus leading to an explosion in the growth of algae. The algae can cover the lake and block sunlight from reaching the organisms below, typically killing them.

== Legal framework ==
Some aspects of NPS water pollution are regulated at the federal, state, and local level, but to a lesser extent than point sources. The pollution persists and remains a significant problem in many watersheds. NPS water pollution comes from numerous and diverse sources, and control measures are expensive to implement. State and local governments are generally responsible for implementing NPS regulations. Coordination among localities can be difficult, and, furthermore, localities often lack the incentive to rigorously enforce NPS regulations because their NPS pollution is exported downriver, where other towns and cities must deal with the consequences.

=== Federal laws ===
There are two principal federal laws effecting NPS water pollution: the Clean Water Act and the Coastal Zone Management Act. In addition, EPA's "Clean Water Action Plan" (2009) outlines a strategy for enforcing CWA requirements, some of which are applicable to nonpoint sources.

==== Clean Water Act ====
The Clean Water Act (CWA) was the first federal law designed to directly address water pollution. The CWA has been amended many times, but the 1972 amendments provide the core statutory basis for the regulation of point source water pollution and created the National Pollutant Discharge Elimination System (NPDES) permit program. The 1972 amendments were also the first instance where Congress acknowledged the problem of NPS water pollution by requiring the states to prepare area-wide water quality management plans under Section 208. Congress passed additional amendments to the CWA in 1987 that address NPS water pollution. This section will chronologically address the parts of the CWA that regulate NPS water pollution.

===== Defining NPS water pollution in the CWA =====
The definition of NPS water pollution is open to interpretation. However, federal regulation under the CWA provides a specific legal definition for the term. A "nonpoint source" is defined as any source of water pollution that is not a "point source" as defined in CWA section 502(14). That definition states: "The term 'point source' means any discernible, confined and discrete conveyance, including but not limited to any pipe, ditch, channel, tunnel, conduit, well, discrete fissure, container, rolling stock, concentrated animal feeding operation, or vessel or other floating craft, from which pollutants are or may be discharged. This term does not include agricultural storm water discharges and return flows from irrigated agriculture."

There are important differences between point source pollution and NPS pollution. There are many more nonpoint sources than there are point sources, and nonpoint sources are less discrete, or distinct, than point sources. Furthermore, nonpoint source discharges are not always easily observed, and monitoring nonpoint pollution can be costly. NPS pollution will vary over time and space, based on different weather and geographic conditions. These factors make nonpoint pollution more difficult to regulate than point sources.

===== Section 208 =====
Section 208 was Congress' first attempt to address NPS water pollution, and it directed states and local governments to create management plans that identified future waste treatment needs and identify and control NPS water pollution. The section notes that any areawide management plan must discuss how to identify "agriculturally and silviculturally related nonpoint sources of pollution," and "runoff from manure disposal areas, and from land used for livestock and crop production." Section 208 is in essence a federal funding mechanism for state programs that attempt to control NPS pollution, but its meager funding was completely used up by 1980. Section 208 was widely considered a failure because it did little to actually reduce NPS pollution. It created a voluntary provision that directs states to study whether regulatory controls are needed. The law left decisions to the states about whether to regulate NPS water pollution. There was no process or mechanism to develop standards or enforce them.

===== Section 319 =====
After section 208's failure to control NPS water pollution, in 1987 Congress passed the Water Quality Act which included a new section 319 to address the problem of nonpoint sources. This provision, also non-regulatory, authorizes EPA to fund demonstration programs and provide technical assistance to state and local governments. Some critics have argued that section 319 provides little improvement over section 208. The section requires states to identify water bodies that cannot meet water-quality standards without control of nonpoint sources. The states must then identify best management practices (BMPs) and measures for those impaired sources, along with an implementation plan. The EPA approves these plans, and if a state fails to develop a plan, the EPA must do so for the state. However, there are a number of problems with these provisions. Funding to develop the plans has been scarce. The section does not actually place limits on NPS pollution, and states are not even required implement the plans they create. Another problem with 319 (and 208) is that there is no enforcement mechanism In Natural Resources Defense Council v. EPA (1990), the United States Court of Appeals for the Ninth Circuit held that "Section 319 does not require states to penalize nonpoint source polluters who fail to adopt best management practices; rather it provides for grants to encourage the adoption of such practices."

===== Section 404 =====
Section 404 of the CWA requires that a permit be obtained from the U.S. Army Corps of Engineers for the "discharge of dredged and fill material into the navigable waters at specified disposal sites." The 404 permit process is frequently used to protect wetlands, which are essential to the control of nonpoint pollution because they slow the rate of surface water runoff and remove sediment and other pollutants before they reach lakes and streams. While these permitting procedures may result in decreased NPS water pollution to wetlands, a land developer may be able to choose to build a project at an alternate location and still cause the release of NPS water pollution.

===== Total maximum daily loads =====
CWA section 303(d)(1)(C) requires states to identify waterbodies that do not meet water quality standards after application of the technology-based standards for point source pollution. States must then establish a Total Maximum Daily Load (TMDL) for those water bodies to bring them into compliance with water quality standards. The standards are submitted to EPA for approval. As TMDLs are looking at the total amount of loading, this by definition includes nonpoint sources, so if nonpoint sources are impairing a body of water, the TMDL would have to address a way to reduce those nonpoint sources. TMDLs are required even if a body of water fails to meet quality standards entirely due to nonpoint sources.

===== Concentrated Animal Feeding Operations =====
Depending on the number of animals at a particular site, Concentrated Animal Feeding Operations (CAFOs) may generate significant amounts of manure. One method to remove the manure is to apply it to land for fertilization. However, in an effort to dispose of manure at a reduced costs, some CAFOs have applied excess amounts of manure to land areas. The excess amounts of manure may then be washed away by rain into surface waters. This practice was a key feature in Waterkeeper Alliance et al. v. EPA (2005). Based on that case, decided by the United States Court of Appeals for the Second Circuit, the EPA created its 2008 CAFO Rule. The rule states that the CWA specifically exempts agricultural storm water runoff from being considered a point source, but based on the court's decision in the Waterkeeper case, EPA may treat land applications of excessive amounts of manure as a point source. While in general agricultural storm water runoff from CAFOs is a nonpoint source, CAFOs may end up requiring an NPDES permit.

==== Clean Water Action Plans ====
There have been two "Clean Water Action Plans" offered by federal authorities that would affect NPS water pollution. They are both executive orders, not legislation from Congress. The first was issued by President Bill Clinton in 1998. The second, and more recent strategy was issued by Obama Administration in 2009. Both plans provided funding and guidance to address NPS water pollution.

==== Coastal Zone Management Act ====
The Coastal Zone Management Act (CZMA) was passed in 1972 and provides for the management of the nation's coast lands and the Great Lakes. When Congress reauthorized the CZMA in 1990, it identified NPS water pollution as a significant factor in the degradation of coastal waters. To address NPS water pollution in coastal areas, the 1990 amendments to the CZMA created the Coastal Zone Enhancement Grants (CZEG) Program. The states must submit information on their programs to the Secretary of Commerce and the EPA Administrator, who are in charge of approving the plan. The plan is to be implemented in conjunction with the states NPS water pollution plan under section 319 of the CWA and through changes in the overall coastal zone management program. If a state does not submit an approved program, the state may lose a percentage of the grant money provided under the CZMA and under section 319 of the CWA. The EPA is also to provide some guidance to states in developing their NPS coastal management plans through the publication of national guidelines on management measures. These management measures must be economically achievable for new and existing NPS water pollution and must reduce pollution to the greatest extent achievable through current BMPs.

=== State & local laws ===
States have primary responsibility for implementing NPS water pollution regulations. Both the CZMA and the CWA direct the states to draft and implement NPS plans, and the federal government plays a limited role. As noted in the previous section on federal regulations, the CWA and CZMA provide financing for states to implement NPS programs, and those NPS programs have taken a variety of forms. The majority of state plans rely on education and technical assistance, including the development of BMPs, to reduce NPS water pollution. Local governments also have an important role to play in NPS regulation. Local municipality, water conservation districts and other entities with land management responsibility provide planning, zoning, and technical and informational assistance to control NPS pollution. While the approaches states and local governments have taken to regulating NPS water pollution are perhaps too numerous to count, a survey of a few state approaches can provide insight on common NPS implementation plans.

==== Indiana ====
Indiana uses a common approach to address NPS pollution known as the watershed approach. A watershed includes "the total geographic area that drains storm water (and pollutants) to a particular stream, lake, aquifer, or other water body." The watershed approach to addressing NPS water pollution attempts to address all the relevant water bodies holistically in the context of their watershed while also considering all the potential sources of pollution within a watershed.

The Indiana Department of Environmental Management (IDEM) was required under section 303(d) of the CWA to create a list of impaired waters for which TMDLs would be required. IDEM's NPS and watershed efforts concentrate on these impaired water resources. Implementation of TMDLs is managed by local watershed organizations, and NPS pollution controls are only voluntary. Watershed groups use funding from IDEM to create incentive programs for the use of BMPs, as well as provide public information and education. Funding sources for NPS pollution regulation in Indiana include CWA 319(h) grants; CWA 205(j) grants; grants from the Environmental Quality Incentives Program of the Food, Conservation, and Energy Act of 2008; and a wide variety of foundations and individual fundraising. Zoning ordinances may also be structured in a way that limits NPS water pollution.

==== California ====
California's NPS plan requires coordination from 28 different state agencies, which reveals the institutional challenges that NPS regulation may encounter. The California State Water Resources Control Board's Division of Water Quality and the California Coastal Commission (CCC) designed California's NPS plan pursuant to the CWA and the Federal Coastal Zone Act Reauthorization Amendments of 1990. California's NPS plan for 1998–2013 states that California, like Indiana, uses a watershed management approach to controlling NPS pollution. The plan began by identifying roughly 1,500 water body-pollutant combinations that would require a TMDL under the CWA section 303(d).

The plan takes a three tiered approach to implement management measures for NPS pollution. The first tier considers "self-determined implementation of best management practices." This essentially considers voluntary programs, grants, and education. California has a number of educational programs designed to help alert local policymakers to the problems associated with NPS pollution, including the California Water and Land Use Partnership and the Model Urban Runoff Program. Incentive programs under this tier include measure like financial assistance for local watershed stewardship projects through grants from the CWA section 319 and environmental quality incentives programs for implementation cost-sharing. The first tier is less stringent than tiers two or three. The second tier of the plan is called the "regulatory-based encouragement of management practices." The second tier essentially works by allowing polluters to adopt certain managements measures that discourage NPS pollution rather than go through various permitting procedures. Regional water quality control boards may work with landowners and resource managers to waive the adoption of waste discharge requirements (WDRs), a type of effluent limitation, if a polluter adopts certain BMPs. The third tier is called "effluent limitations and enforcement." The effluent limitations may be set at a level where the only realistic manner of compliance is the adoption of BMPs. These limitations are command and control requirements for some activities, including for example WDRs for commercial nurseries, WDRs for selenium for the San Joaquin River, permitted storm water programs, erosion control for Lake Tahoe, and WDRs for dairies.

A number of these regulations are derived from California's Porter-Cologne Act, which established the State Water Resources Control Board, along with nine regional boards that are tasked with implementing the Porter Cologne Act. The Act created state water quality standards that the boards must enforce. WDRs are one direct regulation California government agencies use under the Act to regulate NPS pollution. California has a number of other pieces of legislation that address NPS pollution, like the California Coastal Act and the California Environmental Quality Act.

== Policy instruments and regulatory approaches ==
There are five primary stakeholders involved in NPS water pollution regulation: government agencies, environmental advocacy groups, potentially regulated entities, and the public. Government stakeholders are government agencies responsible for regulating NPS pollution. In addition to scientific results, agencies are concerned with how new regulations may influence their funding. Environmental advocacy stakeholders are organizations that aim to solve environmental problems, such as the Natural Resources Defense Council. These groups focus on the involvement of concerned citizens. The potentially regulated entities are the industries that will be regulated under new regulation. The public is a key stakeholder group, and various measures have been taken to engage the public on NPS water pollution, including the publication of citizen handbooks on NPS water pollution and online information. Environmental regulations for nonpoint sources must be expressed in directives that are specifically understandable by the regulatory target and enforceable by subsequent government intervention. The legal section above noted a number of policy options that have been used for regulating NPS water pollution. Some of the options include: volunteerism, command and control regulations, incentive based instruments, design standards, emissions limits, product bans, trading systems, subsidies, liability rules, and other options.

=== Volunteerism ===
Volunteerism mainly depends on polluters' moral constraints and social pressure. Public education and information about nonpoint pollution provide control mechanism. This is a weak, but common, option for NPS regulation when compared to other regulatory options. It is weak because it doesn't require any action be taken; it relies on polluters taking action themselves.

=== Command and control ===
Command and control policies are direct government regulations. The CWA is designed with this kind of direct command and control regulation for point source pollution. However, command and control regulations through the CWA apply to nonpoint source pollution a lesser extent. TMDLs are one tool in the CWA that directly regulates NPS effluent. As noted earlier, the CWA requires state governments to set TMDLs based on both point source and NPS effluent. However, conventional command and control policies could potentially influence industry structure and cause political reluctance in the event that it could bankrupt businesses.

=== Economic incentives ===
Incentive based instruments include performance incentives, like taxes on nonpoint pollution sources; design incentives, like subsidies on inputs and control technology; market-based approaches, like trading and/or abatement allowances. Economic incentives are frequently used to control NPS pollution, and include things like the CWA section 319 and 208 grants. Below, different economic incentives are listed along with explanations and how they apply to NPS pollution.

==== Design standards or technology specifications ====
These types of regulations specify how a certain plant, piece of machinery, or pollution control apparatus should be designed. The Occupational Safety and Health Administration (OSHA) and United States Environmental Protection Agency (EPA) have written numerous design standards on the assumption that a particular technology exists whose performance can meet the regulations. A regulatory target may prudently decide its safest course to compliance is to install that technology.

Design-based standards are widely applied to agricultural nonpoint sources, including BMPs on cropland. For example, there can be a mandatory establishment of riparian buffer strips between the cropland and neighboring water bodies. There are also restrictions on where and at what rates agricultural chemicals can be applied to crops. Design based standards require an effective measurement approach, like BMPs, while performance standards limit pollutant discharges to a specified amount.

==== Performance standards or emission limits ====
Performance standards or emission limits are types of regulations that set an objective or performance level for the regulatory target to meet. What makes these regulatory approaches unique is that they do not specify how the polluter must meet the standard. These regulations can include emission limits that specify the rate, amount, and kinds of pollutants that may be emitted from a given source over a specific period. The EPA's various effluent limitations for water pollution under the CWA are simply a few of the many environmental regulations that are nominally performance standards.

==== Product bans and use limitations ====
These prohibit a product or activity or limit its use. Product bans and limitations apply to NPS pollution through restrictions on things like chemicals, pesticides, and food additives. For example, farmers were banned from using the insecticide DDT in 1972 for their crops because it was found to be harmful to humans and wildlife.

==== Marketable allowances and trading system ====
Marketable allowances are a regulatory approach that allows companies to buy and sell pollution rights. This type of regulation uses market forces to ensure that pollution is reduced in the least costly manner to the polluter. Under a marketable allowance system, there is a presumption that permits will be traded to those companies which have the highest pollution abatement costs. These companies would then sell their allowances to other companies for whom such reductions would be more expensive.

Auctions to effectively allocate resources, like public pollution control expenses, could increase competition and maximize revenues in private markets for pollution control. This mechanism could also be used to improve the efficiency and cost-effectiveness of government programs. This mechanism provides better market-based information to allocate resources effectively with lower cost. The societal goal is to reduce pollution rather than to avoid paying for unsuccessful pollution control projects. Auctions for public pollution control expenses could be a way to deal with some of the most intractable sources of pollution including nonpoint pollution sources. The government could accept bids based on units of cost per units of pollution reduced and it could pay based on proof of actual pollution reductions based on a performance measurement.

An optimal economical trading ratio for tradable permits, such as through the NPDES program, can define allowable loading amounts for polluters with permits. The number of polluters then becomes the key factor for this instrument. Based on the stochastic nature of nonpoint pollution, NPDES permit system for point sources can not simply be used on nonpoint sources. Although many literature reviews mention tradable permits between point sources and nonpoint sources, unfortunately, current economic literature provides little guidance as to how to set trading ratios. Important factors like environmental risk and relative contributions to ambient pollution are critical to designing the appropriate ratio.

==== Pollution taxes or emission charges ====
Typical policy remedies such as Pigovian taxes cannot address the issue of non-point source pollution. Such policies require direct monitoring of pollution at the individual polluter level. This is, by definition of pollution being non-point source, infeasible. The economics literature has many alternative policy remedies however. These alternative policies try to apply the polluter pays principle but basing the tax on what can be observed. Things that a tax can be based on include, the use of dirty inputs, a proxy for individual emissions, or some measure of ambient pollution level.

In the case of agriculture, one basis for NPS controls would be to tax farmers based on the amount of erosion they cause. However, measuring erosion and topsoil is expensive. Another way is to impose special purpose district property taxes on farmland that does not adopt BMPs or employ methods to reduce nonpoint source pollution.

Another option is to tax farmers based on the amount of fertilizer and pesticides they use. Taxes on pesticides, however, would be limited by the Federal Insecticide, Fungicide, and Rodenticide Act (FIFRA) which takes into account economic impacts. However, a tax on pesticides would only reduce one source of agricultural NPS pollution and would ignore other important sources, such as livestock waste runoff from Concentrated Animal Feeding Operations (CAFOs).

Research done by Segerson "demonstrated that taxes-based approaches on ambient water quality can achieve an efficient level of nonpoint pollution, with a uniform tax appropriate for heterogeneous farmers only when marginal benefits of abating pollution are constant." When marginal damages from pollution are uncertain, a cost-effectiveness approach is often the most useful framework. The most cost-effective policy is one that has the smallest deadweight loss in achieving certain policy goals. One case study in Salinas Valley in California shows a water-only tax at about $0.21/mm-ha would achieve a 20% reduction, cost roughly $138 in tax payment; a nitrogen-only tax at $0.76/kg associated with a tax bill of $79 could also achieve a 20% reduction.

==== Subsidies ====
Subsidies are the converse of taxes. Corporate investments beneficial to the environment can be encouraged by providing companies with public funds, tax breaks, or other benefits to subsidize such activities. In the past, subsidies frequently promoted environmentally destructive activities. Elimination of such subsidies can be a means to promote environmental protections. However, subsidy programs are not without problems. They are often difficult to revise or abandon, may result in a free-rider effect, and may have unintended effects that negate some benefits The federal government has provided a number of subsidies to state NPS programs. The CZMA, for example, provides funds for state coastal NPS programs.

==== Deposit refund systems ====
A deposit-refund system for contaminants like pesticides, which is similar to current programs for beverage containers could potentially reduce uncontrolled disposal, over-use, and recycling for pesticides. For example, the retail dealer could pay a deposit when purchasing pesticides, and pass the deposit to consumers, who could receive a refund when he or she returned the container to dealers.

=== Liability rules and insurance requirements ===
Some statutes strengthen common law rules imposing liability for environmental damage. Regulations issued under other statutes are intended to increase the effectiveness of liability rules by requiring that facilities seeking permits to handle hazardous materials have sufficient insurance or other resources to pay for potential damage caused by their activities. Liability guides compensation when polluters are sued. Liability could be strict (pay for any damages), or negotiable with the victims. However, private lawsuits are a difficult way to resolve nonpoint source pollution because it is difficult to prove NPS pollution was the proximate cause of damages. The inability to trace nonpoint sources could greatly weaken the effectiveness of liability. Agriculture is a major source for nonpoint pollution sources, including nutrients, sediments, pesticides and salts, etc. Disaster insurance for agricultural sector could be necessary for preventing nonpoint pollution based on its characteristics. The uncertainty associate with nonpoint pollution may demand an "insurance policy" to protect water quality.

=== Information and education ===
A number of policies have been developed that are intended to inform regulators and private citizens as to how NPS effluent can be better controlled. One example is with the CZMA mentioned earlier, the EPA is required to provide states with a listing of BMPs for controlling NPS coastal pollution. BMPs are state-of-the-art methods to treat NPS pollution. There is no shortage of BMPs to reduce NPS pollution. For agriculture, examples of BMPs include: conservation easements, cover crops, drainage management, grid sampling, manure injection, manure staging, reduced tillage practices, rotational grazing, and two stage ditches. The obvious problem with educational and informational tools, however, is there is no guarantee they will be implemented.

=== Other potential policy instruments for nonpoint pollution ===
To evaluate these tools' potential, some economic, distributional and political characteristics should be considered: economic performance, administration and enforcement costs, flexibility, incentives for innovation and political feasibility. Challenge regulation or environmental contracting could also be applied. With challenge regulation, the government could establish a clear environmental performance target, while the regulated community could design and implement a program for achieving it. Environmental contracting involved an agreement between a government agency and a source to waive certain regulatory requirements in return for an enforceable commitment to achieve superior performances.

== Challenges for regulation ==
Nonpoint source controls are difficult to coordinate because they are usually administered by local rather than state government. Local governments do not have an incentive to adopt nonpoint source controls because their nonpoint pollution usually is exported elsewhere. Another problem is the pervasiveness of nonpoint pollution. A major strategy controls nonpoint pollution at the source by reducing surface runoff through the use of BMPs. BMPs are fragmented and difficult to coordinate because of the great variety in nonpoint sources and because they are administered by local governments. Another obstacle to control nonpoint pollution is that the nonpoint source may be unable to internalize the cost of the control or pass it on to consumers. Besides, policy instruments and policy combination should have strong legal enforcement like liability to insure transparency in transaction and prevent failure in market based instruments.

Characteristics of NPS and the differences from point source pollution indicated stricter and powerful control mechanism should be applied. Market-based approaches, design-based approaches, and command and control could be useful, and a policy tool combination or best suit tool depends on particular problem, local condition and policy goal, as well as costs and budget would be desired. The ultimate goal for controlling nonpoint pollution is to maximize environmental benefits, especially in some environmental sensitive areas, degraded areas, critical habitats for endangered species. The baseline for nonpoint pollution abatement should be attending acceptable water quality.

Collaboration among agencies is necessary. Federal agencies involved in nonpoint pollution control include the Natural Resources Conservation Service, US Forest Service, Office of Surface Mining Reclamation and Enforcement, Bureau of Land Management and the Army Corps of Engineers. Effective management of NPS pollution requires a partnership among state, federal, local agencies as well as private interests and the public. Coordination among existing programs, especially governmental spending programs, should be performance objectives. Examples of coordination include the federal Clean Water State Revolving Fund and governmental spending programs under the CWA and the Farm Bill
