= Industrial stormwater =

Runoff from precipitation that lands on industrial sites

Industrial stormwater is runoff from precipitation (rain, snow, sleet, freezing rain, or hail) that lands on industrial sites (e.g. manufacturing facilities, mines, airports). This runoff is often polluted by materials that are handled or stored on the sites, and the facilities are subject to regulations to control the discharges.

To manage industrial stormwater effectively, facilities use best management practices (BMPs) that aim to both prevent pollutants from entering the runoff and treat water before it's released from the site. Common preventive steps include maintaining clean workspaces, conducting routine equipment checks, storing materials properly, preventing spills, and training staff on pollution prevention techniques.

To treat stormwater, facilities may install structural controls such as detention and retention ponds, constructed wetlands, filter systems, or oil-water separators. These systems help reduce pollution by settling out solids, filtering water, or supporting natural treatment processes before the water is discharged.

== Regulation in the United States ==
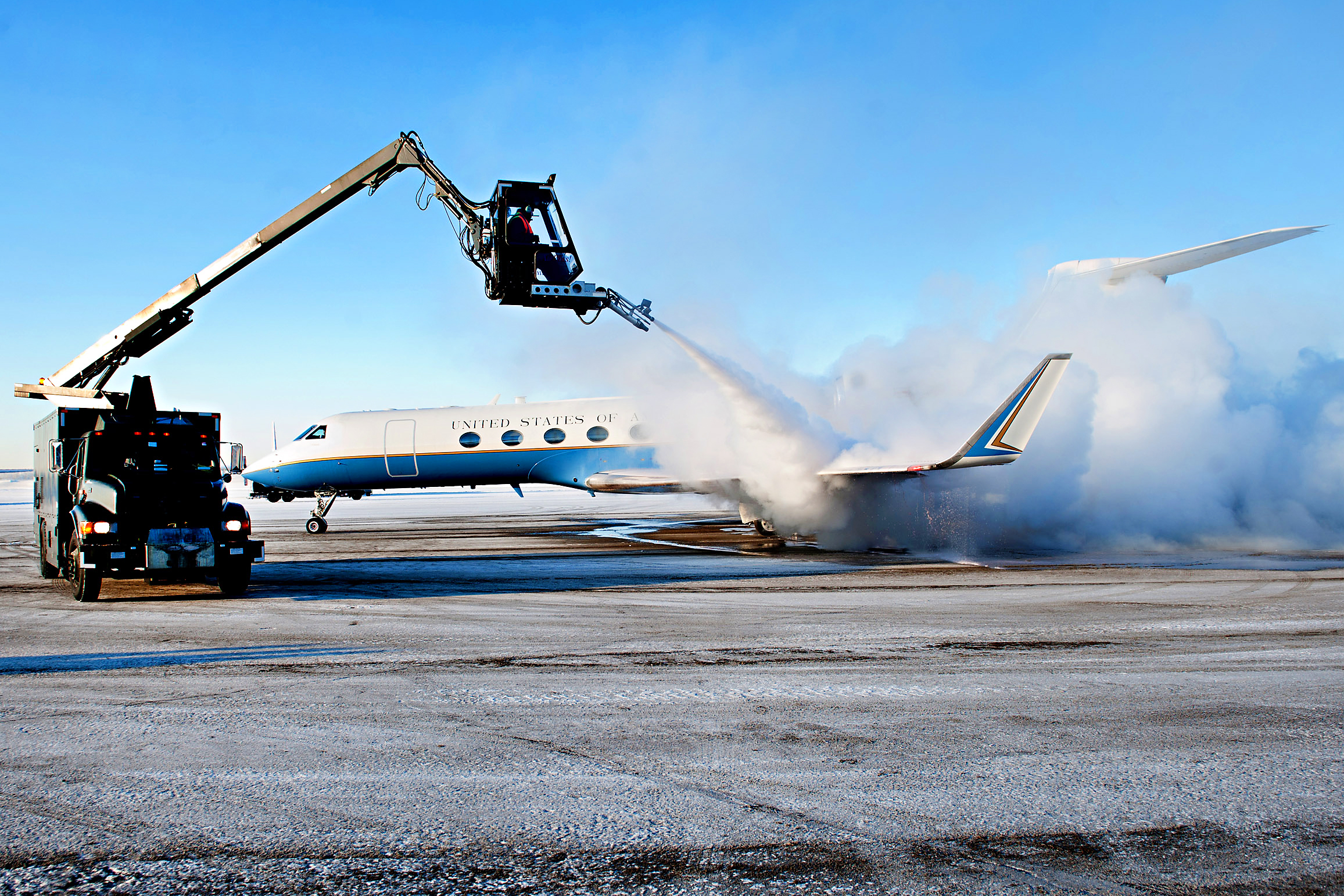
Deicing of aircraft. All U.S. airports are required to obtain stormwater permits

In the United States, facilities that discharge industrial stormwater to surface waters must obtain a permit under the National Pollutant Discharge Elimination System (NPDES), pursuant to the Clean Water Act. Stormwater permit regulations issued by the United States Environmental Protection Agency (EPA) govern the permit process. EPA published its "Phase I" stormwater rule, which covers industrial dischargers, in 1990.

Most stormwater permits in the U.S. are issued by the agencies in 47 states that have been given authority by EPA. EPA regional offices issue the stormwater permits in the remaining parts of the country.

Many industrial sites are legally required to have a Stormwater Pollution Prevention Plan (SWPPP), which outlines the steps they’ll take to control and monitor runoff. In the U.S., this falls under regulations like the National Pollutant Discharge Elimination System (NPDES).

Ongoing inspections and monitoring are essential to ensure these controls are working as intended, identify issues early, and maintain compliance while protecting nearby waterways.

=== Multi-sector general permit ===
EPA published its Multi-Sector General Permit (MSGP) initially in 1995 to govern how industrial stormwater should be managed, and periodically it has updated and reissued the permit. The 2021 MSGP covers 30 industrial and commercial sectors:

1. Timber Products Facilities (including wood preservation)
2. Paper and Allied Products Manufacturing Facilities
3. Chemical and Allied Products Manufacturing and Refining
4. Asphalt Paving and Roofing Materials and Manufacturers and Lubricant Manufacturers
5. Glass, Clay, Cement, Concrete, and Gypsum Product Manufacturing Facilities
6. Primary Metals Facilities
7. Metal Mining (Ore Mining and Dressing) Facilities
8. Coal Mines and Coal Mining-Related Facilities
9. Oil and GasExtraction Facilities
10. Mineral Mining and Processing Facilities
11. Hazardous Waste Treatment, Storage, or Disposal Facilities
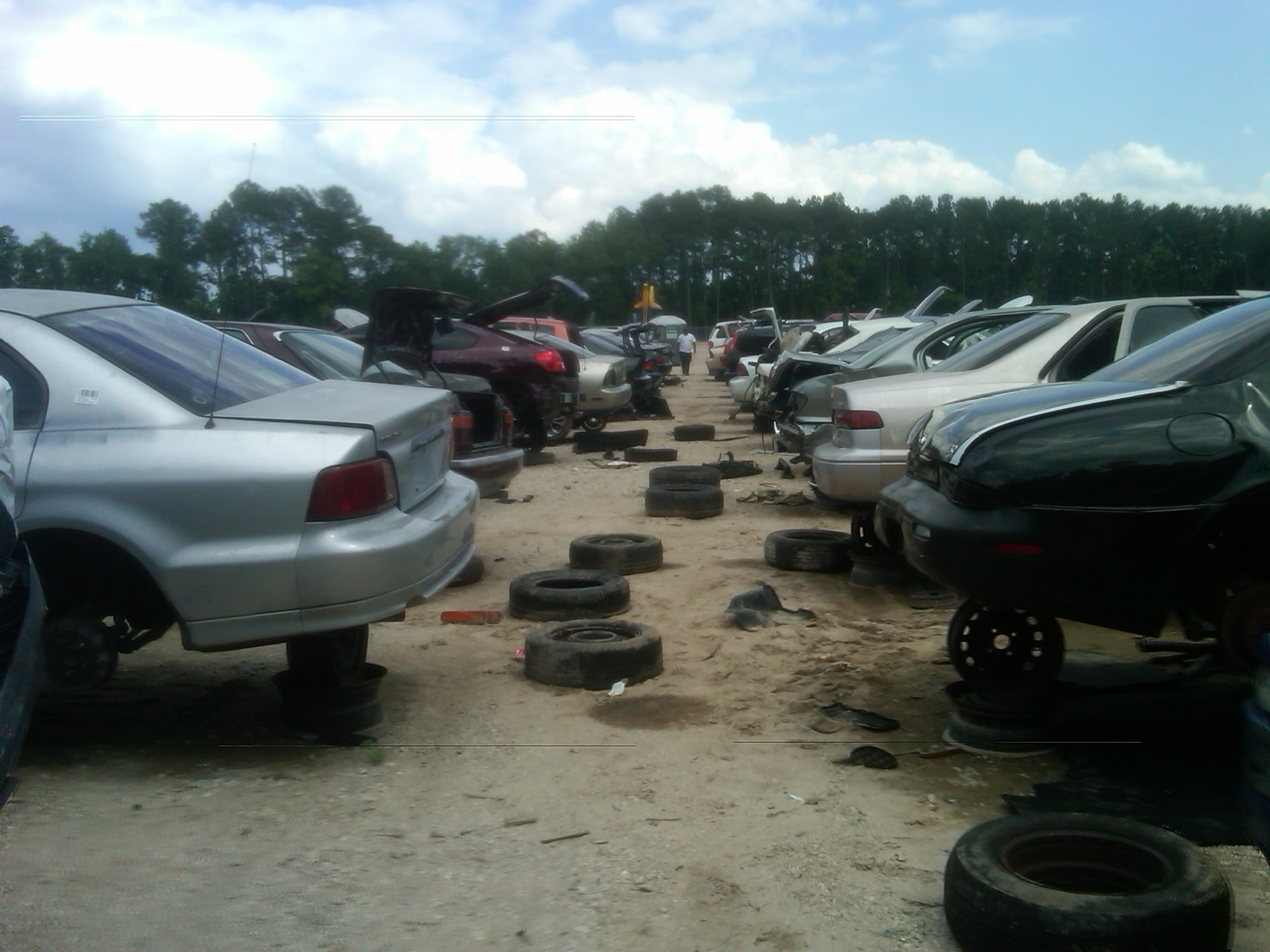
12. Scrap yards must obtain stormwater permits and control stormwater runoff
13. Landfills and Land Application Sites
14. Automobile Salvage Yards
15. Scrap Recycling and Waste Recycling Facilities
16. Steam Electric Power Generating Facilities, including Coal Handling Areas
17. Motor Freight Transportation Facilities, Passenger Transportation Facilities, Petroleum Bulk Oil Stations and Terminals, Rail Transportation Facilities, and United States Postal Service Transportation Facilities
18. Water Transportation Facilities with Vehicle Maintenance Shops and/or Equipment Cleaning Operations
19. Ship and Boat Building or Repair Yards
20. Vehicle Maintenance Areas, Equipment Cleaning Areas, or Deicing Areas Located at Air Transportation Facilities
21. Sewage treatment plants
22. Food and Kindred Products Facilities
23. Textile Mills, Apparel, and Other Fabric Products Manufacturing Facilities
24. Wood and Metal Furniture and Fixture Manufacturing Facilities
25. Printing and Publishing Facilities
26. Rubber, Miscellaneous Plastic Products, and Miscellaneous Manufacturing Industries
27. Leather Tanning and Finishing Facilities
28. Fabricated Metal Products Manufacturing Facilities
29. Transportation Equipment, Industrial, or Commercial Machinery Manufacturing Facilities
30. Electronic and Electrical Equipment and Components, Photographic, and Optical Goods Manufacturing Facilities
31. Other industrial facilities not in the above categories that are designated by the permit authority as needing a permit

The permit is applicable to facilities in Massachusetts, New Hampshire, New Mexico, the District of Columbia and federal insular areas (territories). The other states have developed their own state-specific industrial stormwater permits (e.g. California's Industrial General Permit). State-issued general permits often include the same requirements as EPA's permit, but some states have additional requirements.

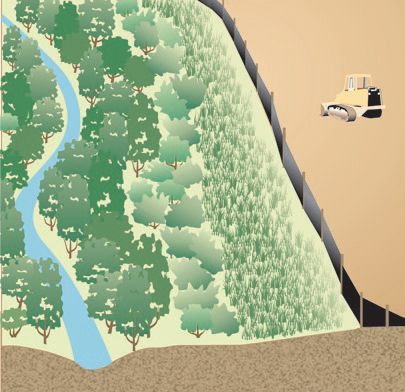
A silt fence is a type of sediment control used on construction sites.

=== Construction site stormwater ===
Under EPA regulations, stormwater runoff from construction sites is also classified as industrial stormwater, however these discharges are covered by a separate set of permits. EPA periodically publishes its Construction General Permit and the approved state agencies publish similar permits, to regulate discharges from construction sites of 1 acre (4,000 m^{2}) or more. (Also covered are sites that are less than one acre in size, that are part of a larger common plan of development that will disturb more than 1 acre.) In addition to implementing the NPDES requirements, many states and local governments have enacted their own stormwater management laws and ordinances, and some have published stormwater treatment design manuals. Some of these state and local requirements have expanded coverage beyond the federal requirements. For example, the State of Maryland requires erosion and sediment controls on construction sites of 5,000 sq ft (460 m^{2}) or more.

== See also ==
- Industrial wastewater treatment
- Stormwater
- United States regulation of point source water pollution
