= United States regulation of point source water pollution =

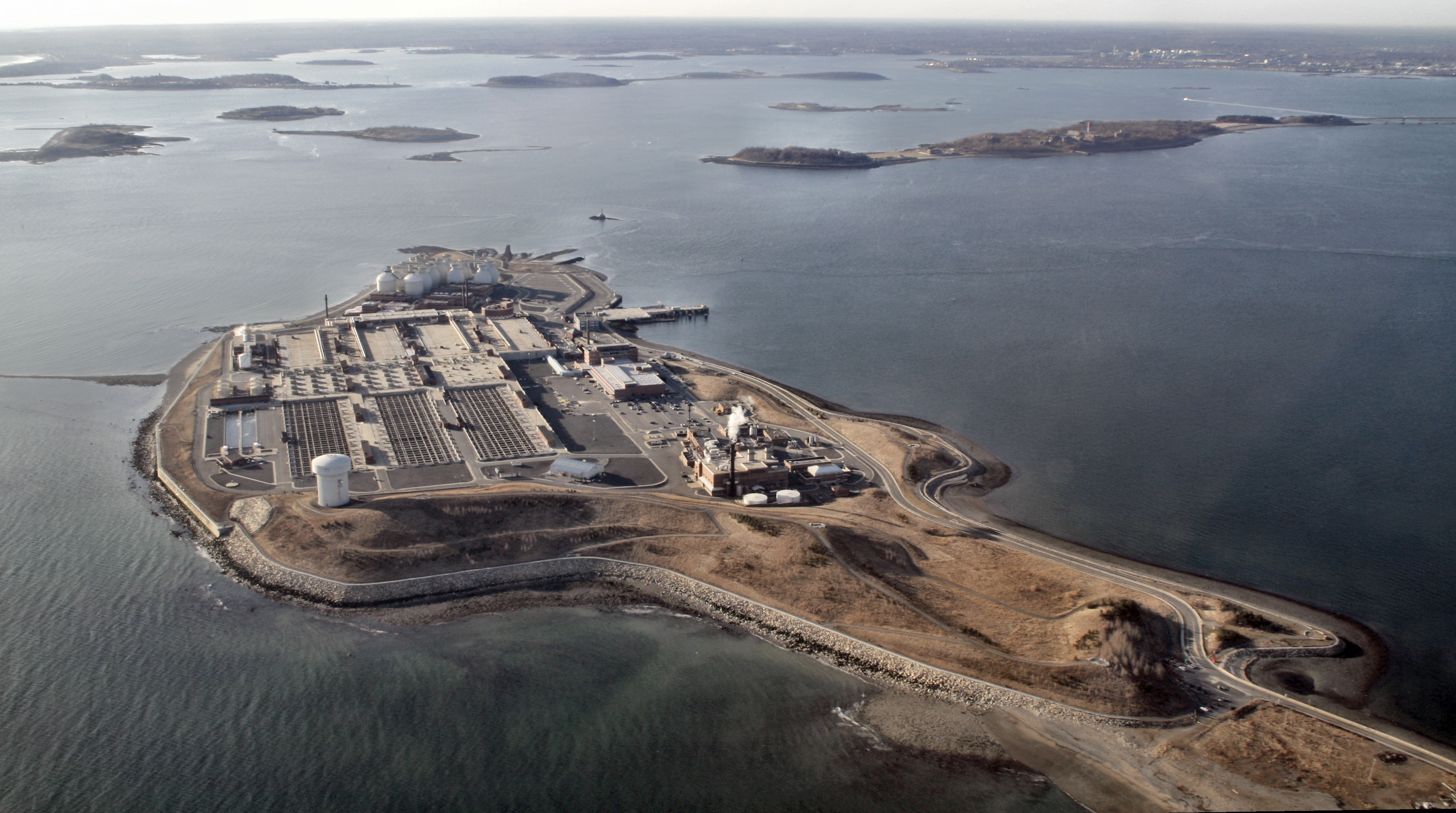
The Deer Island Waste Water Treatment Plant, serving the Boston, Massachusetts area, is a typical point source discharger.

Point source water pollution comes from discrete conveyances and alters the chemical, biological, and physical characteristics of water. In the United States, it is largely regulated by the Clean Water Act (CWA). Among other things, the Act requires dischargers to obtain a National Pollutant Discharge Elimination System (NPDES) permit to legally discharge pollutants into a water body. However, point source pollution remains an issue in some water bodies, due to some limitations of the Act. Consequently, other regulatory approaches have emerged, such as water quality trading and voluntary community-level efforts.

== Introduction ==
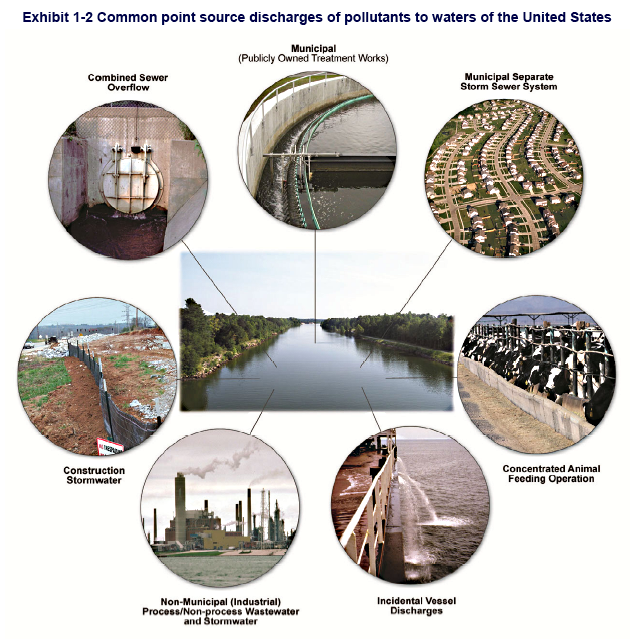
Common point source discharges

=== Definition ===
Water pollution is the contamination of natural water bodies by chemical, physical, radioactive or pathogenic microbial substances. Point sources of water pollution are described by the CWA as "any discernible, confined, and discrete conveyance from which pollutants are or may be discharged." These include pipes or man-made ditches from stationary locations such as sewage treatment plants, factories, industrial wastewater treatment facilities, septic systems, ships, and other sources that are clearly discharging pollutants into water sources.

=== Relevant science ===
The input of pollutants into a water body may impact the water's ability to deliver ecological, recreational, educational, and economic services. While the impacts of water pollution vary considerably based on a variety of site-specific factors, they may be either direct or indirect. Pollutants that are directly toxic pose a threat to organisms that may come into contact with contaminated water. These include persistent organic pollutants used as pesticides and toxic byproducts of industrial activity (such as cyanide). Other pollutants may indirectly impact ecosystem services by causing a change in water conditions that allows for a harmful activity to take place. This includes sediment (loose soil) inputs that decrease the amount of light that can penetrate through the water, reducing plant growth and diminishing oxygen availability for other aquatic organisms.

There are a variety of water quality parameters that may be affected by point source water pollution. They include: dissolved oxygen and biochemical oxygen demand (BOD), temperature, pH, turbidity, phosphorus, nitrates, total suspended solids, conductivity, alkalinity, and fecal coliform. BOD is perhaps the most widely used metric to assess water quality.

Water quality is also closely linked with water quantity issues. Water shortages from natural and anthropogenic activity reduce the dilutive properties of water and may concentrate water pollution. Conversely, during flooding events, water pollution may spread to previously uncontaminated waters through surface overflow or the failure of man-made barriers.

=== Nature of the problem/context ===
==== Water pollution incidents and public response ====
Before the CWA was enacted, companies indiscriminately discharged their effluents into water bodies. One such water body was the Cuyahoga River located in north-east Ohio. The river was thrust into the national limelight in 1969 when it caught fire, although the river had been plagued by fires since 1936. Pollution of the river had become prevalent in the early 1800s as contaminants from municipal and industrial discharges, bank erosion, commercial/residential development, atmospheric deposition, hazardous waste disposal sites, urban storm water runoff, combined sewer overflows (CSOs) and wastewater treatment plant bypasses were discharged into the river. Time magazine described the Cuyahoga as the river that "oozes rather than flows" and in which a person "does not drown but decays." The 1969 river fire, and the 1969 Santa Barbara oil spill in California—the largest such spill in U.S. history at that time—drew significant public attention to the state of the nation's waterways. Although Congress had been holding hearings and considering additional pollution control legislation in the late 1960s, these widely publicized incidents increased the pressure on Congress to act, which they eventually did with the 1972 Clean Water Act, the establishment of the Environmental Protection Agency (EPA) and later the Oil Pollution Act of 1990.

== Regulatory framework ==
=== History of regulation ===
The Rivers and Harbors Act of 1899 contained provisions that made discharging refuse matter into navigable waters of the United States illegal without a permit issued by the U.S. Army Corps of Engineers. The focus of the law was controlling obstructions to navigation, such as dumping refuse into rivers, and discharging oil from ships and boats. Most legal analysts have concluded that the 1899 law did not address environmental impacts from pollution, such as sewage or industrial discharges. However, there were several pollution enforcement cases in the 1960s and 1970s where the law was cited for broader pollution control objectives, prior to passage of the 1972 Clean Water Act.

By the mid-20th century, water pollution laws in the United States began to include health- and use-based standards to protect environmental and economic interests. In 1948 Congress passed the Federal Water Pollution Control Act (FWPCA). The law authorized the Surgeon General and the Public Health Service to develop programs to combat pollution that was harming surface and underground water sources, but did not create any new regulatory or enforcement authority for pollution control. The FWPCA also authorized cooperation between federal and state agencies to construct municipal sewage treatment plants.

The Water Quality Act of 1965 required states to issue water quality standards for interstate waters, and authorized the newly created Federal Water Pollution Control Administration to set standards where states failed to do so. No mechanism for federal enforcement was established.

The 1966 Clean Water Restoration Act authorized a study to determine the effects of pollution on wildlife, recreation, and water supplies. The Act also set forth guidelines for abatement of water that may flow into international territory and prohibited the dumping of oil into navigable waters of the United States.

The Water Quality Improvement Act of 1970 required the development of certain water quality standards and expanded federal authority in upholding the standards. The most substantial amendments to the FWPCA occurred in 1972 and became known as the Clean Water Act.

=== Clean Water Act ===
Point source water pollution is largely regulated through the Clean Water Act, which gives the EPA the authority to set limits on the acceptable amount of pollutants that can be discharged into waters of the United States. The 1972 law also created federal authority for a permit system—NPDES—to enforce the pollution standards. The Act broadly defines a pollutant as any type of industrial, municipal, and agricultural waste discharged into water, such as: dredged soil, solid waste, incinerator residue, sewage, garbage, sewage sludge, munitions, chemical wastes, biological materials, radioactive materials, heat, wrecked or discarded equipment, rock, sand, cellar dirt and industrial, municipal, and agricultural waste. Point source water pollution is discharged into waters through both direct and indirect methods.

==== Direct dischargers ====
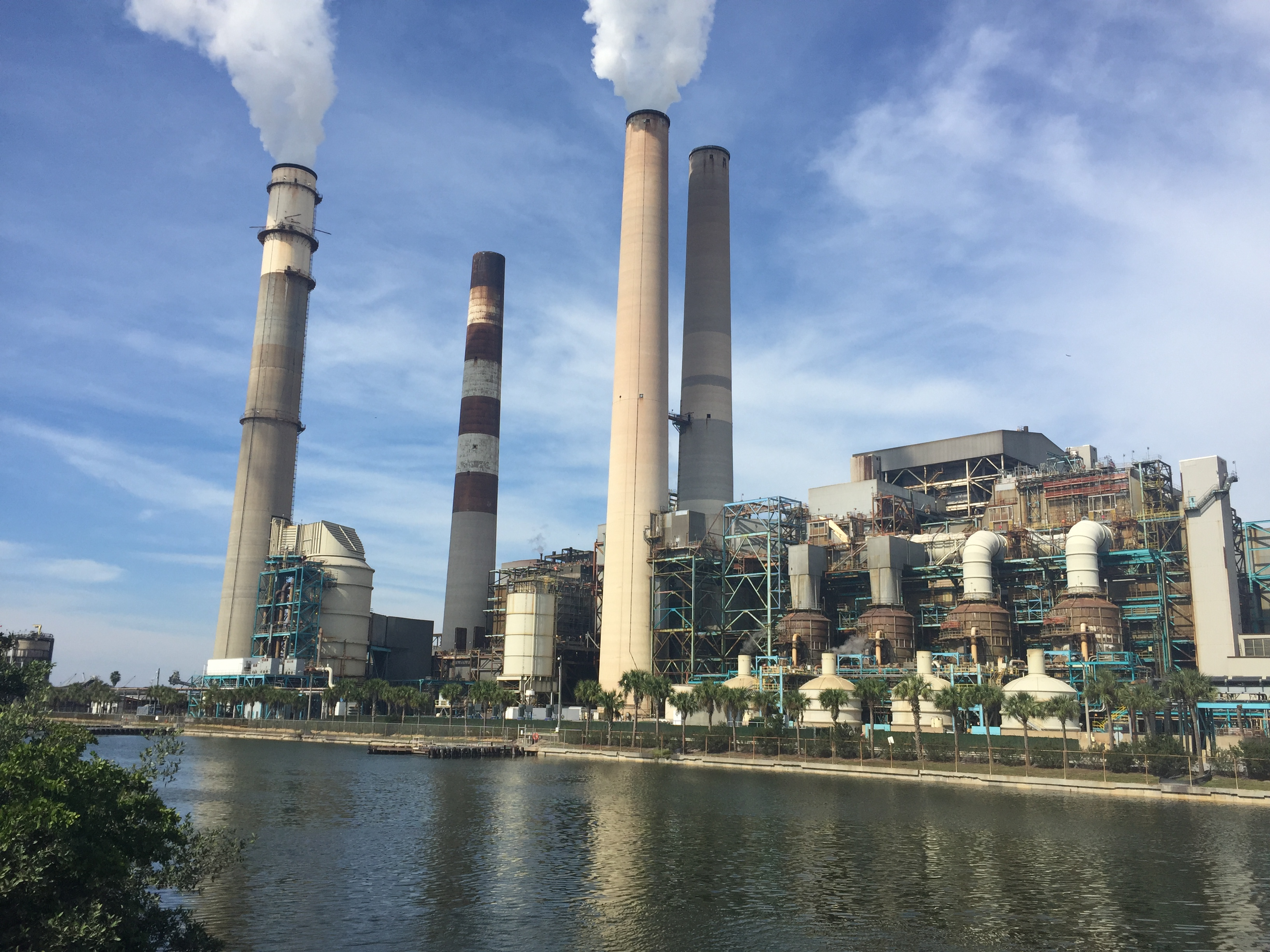
Most electric power plants are direct dischargers.

Direct discharges are pollutants that are discharged directly to a surface water body. To legally discharge pollutants directly into a waterbody, a facility—municipal, industrial, commercial or government-owned—must obtain a National Pollution Discharge Elimination System (NPDES) permit from EPA or a state agency.

===== NPDES Permit Program =====
The NPDES permit program sets limits on the amount of pollutants that can be discharged into a waterbody. Technology based effluent limits establish a minimum level of pollution controls for all point source discharges. If technology based limits are not sufficient to protect a particular water body, then water quality based effluent limits are developed for facilities discharging to that water body.

Permits

Individual states are authorized by the EPA to issue permits when they have demonstrated that their program is at least as stringent as the EPA's program. States perform the day-to-day issuance of permits and oversight of the program while the EPA provides review and guidance to the states. All NPDES permits must contain effluent limitations. The permits (excluding most stormwater management permits) also specify procedures for collection of wastewater samples and the test methods that will be used to analyze the samples.

Types of permits

- Individual – A unique permit is issued for each discharger.
- General – A single permit that covers a large number of similar dischargers; in some cases, located in a specific geographic area. Examples include the EPA Vessels General Permit and industrial stormwater general permits.

Permitting process

The authorized permit issuing body receives and reviews the permit application. The technology-based and water quality-based effluent limits are developed and then compared to determine which is the more stringent, which is then used as the effluent limit for the permit. Monitoring requirements, special conditions, and standard conditions for each pollutant are developed and the permit is then issued and its requirements are implemented.

- Technology-based requirements: A minimum level of treatment based on available treatment technologies is required for discharged pollutants, however, a discharger may use any available treatment technologies to meet the limits. The effluent limits are derived from different standards for different discharges:
  - Municipal discharges (POTW): National secondary treatment standards define limits of biological treatment standards based on biochemical oxygen demand (BOD), total suspended solids (TSS), and pH balance.
  - Industrial and other non-municipal discharges: Limits for many industrial dischargers are based on national standards for issued for specific categories, such as chemical plants, paper mills, and electric power plants (see Effluent guidelines). EPA issues these limitations based on the performance of pollution control and prevention technologies. For existing dischargers, this level of treatment is equivalent to "Best Available Technology Economically Achievable" (BAT) and for new discharges, the treatment level is "New Source Performance Standards" (NSPS). If there is no applicable national standard (effluent guideline regulation) for a particular facility, the NPDES permit agency develops requirements on a case-by-case basis.
- Water quality-based requirements: Should technology-based standards not be stringent enough, Water Quality Based Effluent Limits (WQBEL) are developed to ensure that water quality standards are attained. WQBELs are based on ambient water quality standards.

Permit components

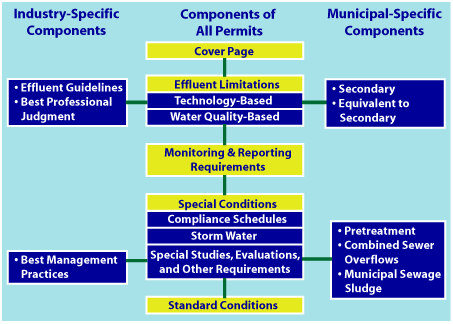
NPDES permit components

All NPDES permits must contain the following five components:

- Cover page – indicates authorization for discharging and its locations
- Effluent limits – limits used to control discharges through technology-based or water quality-based standards
- Monitoring and reporting requirements – used to determine permit compliance
- Special conditions – can be used to supplement effluent limits
- Standard conditions – pre-established conditions that apply to all NPDES permits.

Permit violations

A permitee can be in violation of its permit when it discharges pollutants at a level higher than what is specified on their permit; or discharges without a permit. It can also be in violation if it fails to comply with the monitoring and enforcement portion of the permit.

Enforcement

The NPDES permit program is a self-monitoring system where permitees are required to carry out detailed monitoring requirements. EPA promotes "compliance assistance" as an enforcement technique, and has developed sector-specific assistance centers for various industries.

EPA and authorized state agencies perform periodic inspections of some discharging facilities. The states are responsible for enforcing the permit requirements that they have issued. EPA has the right to carry out enforcement should a state not do so. Enforcement actions for violations include: injunctions, fines for typical violations, imprisonment for criminal violations, or supplemental environmental projects (SEP). Citizens may also bring suits against violators, but they must first provide the EPA and the state agency with advance notice and give the agencies the opportunity to take action.

===== Stormwater management permits =====
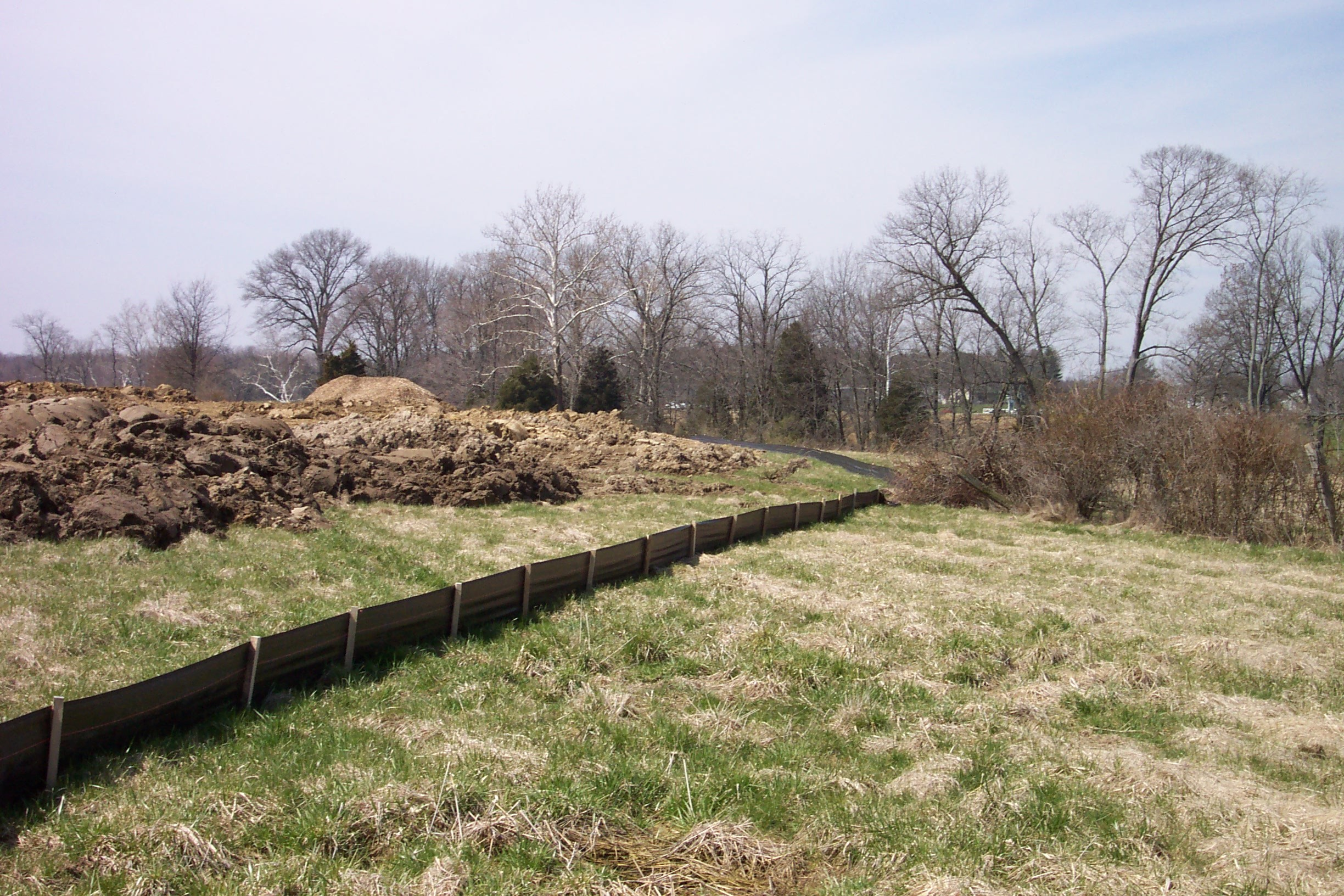
A silt fence, a type of sediment control, installed on a construction site

To address the nationwide problem of stormwater pollution, Congress broadened the CWA definition of "point source" in 1987 to include industrial stormwater discharges and municipal separate storm sewer systems ("MS4"). These facilities are required to obtain NPDES permits. This 1987 expansion was promulgated in two phases. The Phase I regulation, promulgated in 1990, required that all municipalities of 100,000 persons or more, industrial dischargers, and construction sites of 5 acres (20,000 m^{2}) or more have NPDES permits for their stormwater discharges. Phase I permits were issued in much of the U.S. in 1991. The Phase II rule required that all municipalities, construction sites of 1 acre (4,000 m^{2}) or more, and other large property owners (such as school districts) have NPDES permits for their stormwater discharges. EPA published the Phase II regulation in 1999.

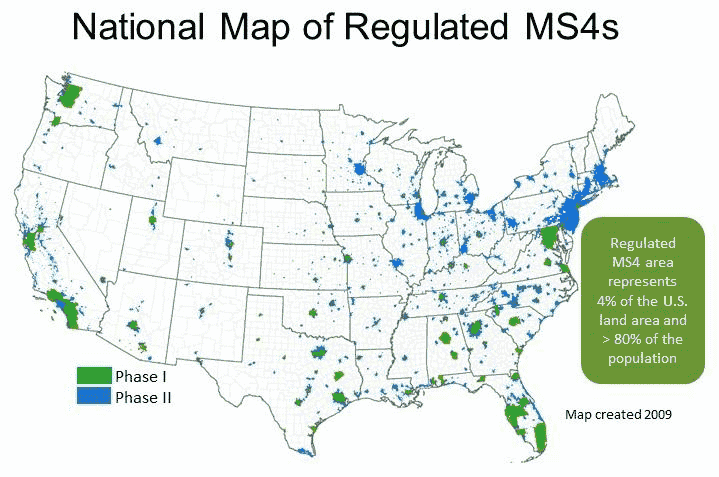
Map of municipal separate storm sewer systems

About 855 Phase I MS4s and 6,695 Phase II MS4s are regulated by the permit system, as of 2018. The MS4s serve over 80% of the US population and provide drainage for 4% of the land area.

Most construction sites are covered by general permits. Other industrial sites that only discharge stormwater are typically covered by general permits. Industrial stormwater dischargers that are otherwise required to have individual permits (due to their process wastewater and/or cooling water discharges), typically have the stormwater management requirements added to their individual permits.

In addition to implementing the NPDES requirements, many states and local governments have enacted their own stormwater management laws and ordinances, and some have published stormwater treatment design manuals. Some of these state and local requirements have expanded coverage beyond the federal requirements. For example, the State of Maryland requires erosion and sediment controls on construction sites of 5,000 sq ft (460 m^{2}) or more. It is not uncommon for state agencies to revise their requirements and impose them upon counties and cities; daily fines ranging as high as $25,000 can be imposed for failure to modify their local stormwater permitting for construction sites, for instance.

==== Indirect dischargers ====
An indirect discharger is one that sends its wastewater into a city sewer system, which carries it to the municipal sewage treatment plant or publicly owned treatment works (POTW). At the POTW, harmful pollutants in domestic sewage, called conventional pollutants, are removed from the sewage and then the treated effluent is discharged into a surface water body. The removed solids constitute sewage sludge, which typically receive further treatment prior to final disposal on land. (See Sewage sludge treatment.) POTWs are not designed to treat toxic or nonconventional pollutants in industrial wastewater, although they may incidentally remove some pollutants.

===== National Pretreatment Program =====
Indirect dischargers are covered by the National Pretreatment Program, which enforces three types of discharge standards:

- prohibited discharge standards – protects against pollutants passing through the POTW untreated, and preventing interference with POTW treatment processes
- categorical standards – national, technology-based standards for industrial categories that limit the discharge of pollutants (see Effluent guidelines)
- local limits – address the specific needs of a POTW and its receiving waters.

The goal of the pretreatment program is to protect municipal wastewater treatment plants from damage that may occur when hazardous, toxic, or other wastes are discharged into a sewer system, and to protect the quality of sludge generated by these plants. Discharges to a POTW are regulated either by the POTW itself, the state/tribe, or EPA.

=== Related programs ===
==== EPA water quality trading policy ====
The Clean Water Act has made great strides in reducing point source water pollution, but this effect is overshadowed by the fact that nonpoint source pollution, which is not subject to regulation under the Act, has correspondingly increased. One of the solutions to address this imbalance is point/nonpoint source trading of pollutants. EPA issued its Water Quality Trading Policy in 2003. At that time, many waters in the United States did not support their designated uses. Specifically, 40 percent of rivers, 45 percent of streams, and 50 percent of lakes that had been surveyed did not meet standards. Consequently, when EPA issued its trading policy it acknowledged that "the progress made toward restoring and maintaining the chemical, physical, and biological integrity of the nation's waters under the 1972 Clean Water Act and its National Pollutant Discharge Elimination System (NPDES) permits has been incomplete."

The purpose of the policy is to "encourage voluntary trading programs that facilitate the implementation of TMDLs, reduce the costs of compliance with CWA regulations, establish incentives for voluntary reductions, and promote watershed-based initiatives (3)." The policy supports the trading of nutrients such as nitrogen and phosphorus and sediment load reductions, but in order for it to be extended to other contaminants, more scrutiny is required. All water quality trading programs are subject to the requirements of the Clean Water Act.

The Trading Policy outlines basic ground rules for trading by specifying viable pollutants, how to set baselines, and detailing the components of credible trading programs. It also stipulates that trades must occur within the same watershed. Water quality trading programs are subject to the stipulations of the Clean Water Act.

==== Other laws that may affect some NPDES permits ====
- Endangered Species Act: Federal agencies must consult with the U.S. Fish and Wildlife Service to ensure that discharges from a project (e.g., a new or expanded industrial facility) will not endanger a threatened species or their habitat.
- National Environmental Policy Act (NEPA): Only discharges that are subject to New Source Performance Standards (or new sources otherwise defined in the NPDES regulations) are subject to NEPA review prior to being issued a permit.
- National Historic Preservation Act: Prior to issuing a permit, EPA Regional Administrators must adopt measures that mitigate adverse effects on properties in the National Register of Historic Places.
- Coastal Zone Management Act: Permits will not be issued unless the permitees certifies that proposed activities, which would affect land or water use in coastal zones, comply with the Coastal Zone Management Act.
- Wild and Scenic Rivers Act: Prohibits issuance of permit for water resources projects that will have a direct, adverse effect on the values for which a national wild and scenic river was established.
- Fish and Wildlife Coordination Act: Jurisdiction over wildlife resources must be established prior to permit issuance so that resources can be conserved.
- Magnuson-Stevens Act: The "Essential Fish Habitat Provisions" in the law require EPA to consult with the National Marine Fisheries Service for any EPA-issued permits which may adversely affect essential fish habitat.

== Problems/issues/concerns ==
=== Funding ===
==== Cost issues for monitoring ====
Monitoring of water bodies is the responsibility of authorized states, not the EPA. In 1997, EPA estimated that private and public point source control costs were $14 billion and $34 billion, respectively. The EPA has acknowledged that states have not adequately funded their monitoring programs, which has led to some uncertainty regarding the quality of most surface waters.

=== Enforcement ===
==== Self-monitoring and self-reporting ====
In many cases, the enforcement mechanisms of the Clean Water Act have created tension between regulators, regulated parties, and local citizens. Most NPDES permits require dischargers to monitor and report the contents of their discharges to the appropriate authorities. This requirement is potentially self-incriminating, forcing industries to provide information that may subject them to penalties and legal constraints. As a result, some dischargers go to great lengths to avoid penalties, including falsifying discharge monitoring reports and tampering with monitoring equipment. In United States v. Robert H. Hopkins, the United States Court of Appeals for the Second Circuit ruled on a case where the vice president for manufacturing at Spirol International Corporation was charged with three criminal violations for falsifying water samples sent to state regulatory agencies. Hopkins directed that the company's samples be diluted; the samples contained high levels of zinc, with tap water on numerous occasions and frequently ordered his subordinates to reduce the zinc concentration in the water by running it through a coffee filter.

==== Tensions between state and federal government ====
Like other environmental laws, the Clean Water Act delegates many enforcement responsibilities to state agencies. While the burden of enforcement may be transferred to the states, federal agencies reserve the right to approve or reject state plans for dealing with water pollution. This relationship reduces the regulatory burden on federal agencies, but can lead to confusion and tension between the two regulators.

Many of these tensions arise with regards to the Commerce Clause of the Constitution. Until recently, the commerce clause has given the federal government considerable authority in regulating states' decisions about water use. In 2000, the United States Supreme Court ruled on Solid Waste Agency of Northern Cook County v. US Army Corps of Engineers. This ruling struck down the Corps' ability to prevent the construction of a disposal site for non-hazardous waste in Illinois based on power derived from the commerce clause. The Corps cited the Migratory Bird Rule when they initially denied the section 404 permit under the Clean Water Act. The migratory bird rule was meant to protect habitats used by migratory birds, which included the abandoned mining site that SWANCC had proposed to construct the waste disposal site. Chief Justice Rehnquist wrote: "Congress passes the CWA for the state purpose of 'restoring and maintaining the chemical, physical, and biological integrity of the Nation's waters.' In doing so,, Congress chose to recognize, preserve, and protect the primary responsibilities and rights of States to prevent, reduce, and eliminate pollution, to plan the development and use... of land and water resources...". In reversing the Corps' decision to issue a permit, the court reversed a trend and placed a check on federal power over state land use and water rights. Tensions between federal and state agencies concerning interstate commerce and point source water pollution continue, and are a reality of the Clean Water Act.

=== Ambiguity of the CWA ===
==== Coeur Alaska v. Southeast Alaska Conservation Council ====
In 2009, the Supreme Court ruled on Coeur Alaska, Inc. v. Southeast Alaska Conservation Council. The case concerned the re-opening of a gold mine outside Juneau, Alaska that had been out of operation since 1928. Coeur Alaska planned to utilize froth flotation in order to extract gold, creating 4.5 million tons of tailings over the course of its lifetime. The mining company opted to dispose of the tailings in nearby Lower Slate Lake, requiring a permit to comply with the Clean Water Act. The tailings would fundamentally change the physical and chemical characteristics of the lake, raising the lake bed by 50 feet and expanding the area from 23 to 60 acres. Coeur Alaska proposed to temporarily re-route nearby streams around Lower Slate Lake until they could purify the water and re-introduce the natural flow patterns.

Tailings from froth flotation contain high concentrations of heavy metals, including aluminum, which have toxic effects of aquatic organisms. As a result, the disposal of these tailings into Lower Slate Lake is eligible for a section 402 permit for discharge of a pollutant from the EPA (NPDES permit). The nature of the tailings also justifies their categorization as a fill material, or a "material [that] has the effect of… changing the bottom elevation" of a water body. Consequently, Coeur Alaska was also eligible for a "Dredge and Fill" permit from the Army Corps of Engineers under CWA section 404. The company applied for this latter permit and received authorization from the Corps to dump the tailings into Lower Slate Lake. The Southeast Alaska Conservation Council contended that disposal of the tailings is explicitly banned by section 306(e) of the Clean Water Act, and would therefore make Coeur Alaska ineligible for a NPDES permit.

The Court ruled in favor of Coeur Alaska, explaining that if the Army Corps of Engineers has authority to issue a permit under section 404, the EPA does not have authority to issue a section 402 permit. They asserted that the law is ambiguous as to whether section 306 applies to fill materials and found no erroneous or unreasonable behavior by the Corps. As a result, although the tailings would explicitly violate the Clean Water Act under section 402, the Corps may issue a dredge and fill permit.

This decision has not resonated well with environmental groups, who are worried that the decision may allow companies to discharge massive amounts of hazardous pollutants by avoiding the NPDES permitting procedure. Of particular concern is the mountaintop mining industry, which has the capacity to fundamentally alter aquatic ecosystems by filling in water bodies with sediment and mining debris. This tension between various sections within the Clean Water Act is sure to receive considerable attention in future years.

== Other emerging regulatory approaches ==
=== Water quality trading ===
==== Definition ====
Water quality trading (WQT) is a market-based approach, implemented on a watershed-scale, used to improve or maintain water quality. It involves the voluntary exchange of pollution reduction credits from sources with low costs of pollution control to those with high costs of pollution control. WQT programs are still subject to the requirements of the Clean Water Act, but they can be used to reduce the overall cost of compliance. Usually, permitted point sources of water pollution, such as wastewater treatment plants, have high discharge treatment costs, whereas nonpoint sources of water pollution, such as agriculture, have low costs of pollution reduction. Therefore, it is generally assumed that most trades would take place between point sources and nonpoint sources. However, point source-point source trades could also occur as well as pretreatment trades and intra-plant trades.

==== Background ====
Most of the water quality trading markets currently in operation are focused on the trading of nutrients such as phosphorus and nitrogen. However, increasing interest has been shown in trading programs for sediment runoff, biological oxygen demand, and temperature. WQT programs can be used to preserve good water quality in unimpaired waters by counterbalancing new or increased pollutant discharges. In impaired waters, a WQT program can be used to improve water quality by reducing pollutant discharges in order to meet a specified water quality standard or total maximum daily load (TMDL).

TMDLs apply to both point sources and nonpoint sources and they represent the primary impetus for WQT programs. Point sources of pollutants that require NPDES permits often have strict discharge limits based on a TMDL. WQT can allow these sources to obtain lower costs of compliance, while still achieving the overall desired pollution reduction. Several factors influence whether or not a TMDL-based water quality trading program will be successful. First, the market must be appropriately structured within the regulatory framework of the Clean Water Act. Second, the pollutant must be well-suited for trading. Third, implementation of a WQT market requires public input and voluntary participation. Finally, there must be adequate differences in pollution control costs and available opportunities for reduction.

==== Credits and trade ratios ====
In a WQT market, a unit of pollutant reduction is called a credit. A point source can generate credits by reducing its discharge below its most stringent effluent limitation and a nonpoint source can generate credits "by installing best management practices (BMPs) beyond its baseline". Before being able to purchase credits, source must first meet its technology-based effluent limit (TBEL). The credits can then be used to meet water quality-based effluent limits (WQBEL).

In order to ensure that trades are effective and do not result in more pollution than would occur in their absence, trade ratios are used. Trade ratios can have several components including:

- Location: Source location relevant to the downstream area of concern can be an important factor.
- Delivery: The distance between sources can play a role in determining whether permit requirements are met at the outfall.
- Uncertainty: Nonpoint source reductions can be difficult to quantify.
- Equivalency: Sources may be discharging different forms of the same pollutant.
- Retirement: Credits may be retired to achieve further water quality improvement.

Permitted point sources can trade with other point sources or nonpoint sources. Trades can occur directly, or be brokered by third parties. However, when dealing with nonpoint source reductions, a level of uncertainty does exist. In order to address this, monitoring should be conducted. Modeling can also be used as a supplement to monitoring. Uncertainty can also be mitigated by field testing BMPs and using conservative assumptions for BMP efficacy.

==== Benefits ====
There are many economic, environmental, and social benefits that can be gained by establishing a WQT market within a watershed. Economically, since WQT is a market-based policy instrument, substantial savings can be generated while still achieving a mandated water quality goal. According to The National Cost to Implement Total Maximum Daily Loads (TMDLs) Draft report, flexible approaches to improving water quality, such as WQT markets, could save $900 million per year when compared with the least flexible approach (3). In 2008, WQT programs were worth $11 million, but have the potential for rapid growth. Other economic benefits of WQT include a reduction in the overall costs of compliance, the ability for dischargers to take advantages of economies of scale and differences in treatment efficiencies, and the ability to maintain growth without further harming the environment.

The environmental benefits of WQT programs are also numerous. First, habitats and ecosystems are protected and/or improved. Second, water quality objectives are able to be achieved in a timely manner. Third, there is incentive for innovation and creation of pollution prevention technologies. Finally, nonpoint sources are included in solving water quality problems. Social benefits include dialog among watershed stakeholders and incentives for all dischargers to reduce their pollution.

==== Factors influencing success ====
The success of a WQT market is determined by several factors including the pollutant of interest, physical characteristics of the affected watershed, control costs, trading mechanisms, and stakeholder participation and willingness. It is also important that the desired level of pollution reduction is not so great that all sources must reduce the maximum amount possible because this would eliminate surplus reductions to be used for credits.

==== Obstacles to implementation ====
The biggest obstacle to the widespread adoption of WQT markets is lack of supply and demand. In fact, studies of current water quality trading programs indicate that the typical problems associated with inhibition of water quality trading, such as high transaction costs, poor institutional infrastructure, and uncertain criteria, are being overcome. The main problem is that, under existing regulatory conditions, there are simply not enough willing buyers and sellers. Currently, most nonpoint sources of water pollution are unregulated or, assuming detection occurs, have relatively small consequences for violations. Consequently, nonpoint sources do not have incentive to participate in WQT. For WQT markets to be successful, greater demand is needed for pollution credits. For this to happen, water quality standards need to be clear and enforceable.

==== Contrast to emissions trading ====
Given the success of the sulfur dioxide emission trading market that was established to combat acid rain, at first glance it seems that this level of success should be easily extended to water quality trading. However, the reason this has not occurred yet comes down to a fundamental difference between water pollution and air pollution, and the process of establishing their respective markets. Establishing an emissions market, in principle, has three steps: (1) set a cap on emissions, (2) allocate portions of the cap to individual firms, and (3) allow each firm to meet its allowance through emission reduction or trade. The difference with water pollution, however, is that the problems that cause local water quality issues differ from those that create regional air pollution problems. Discharges into water are difficult to measure and effects are dependent on a variety of other factors and vary with weather and location.

=== Dealing with transboundary pollution: a case study of the U.S./Mexico border region ===
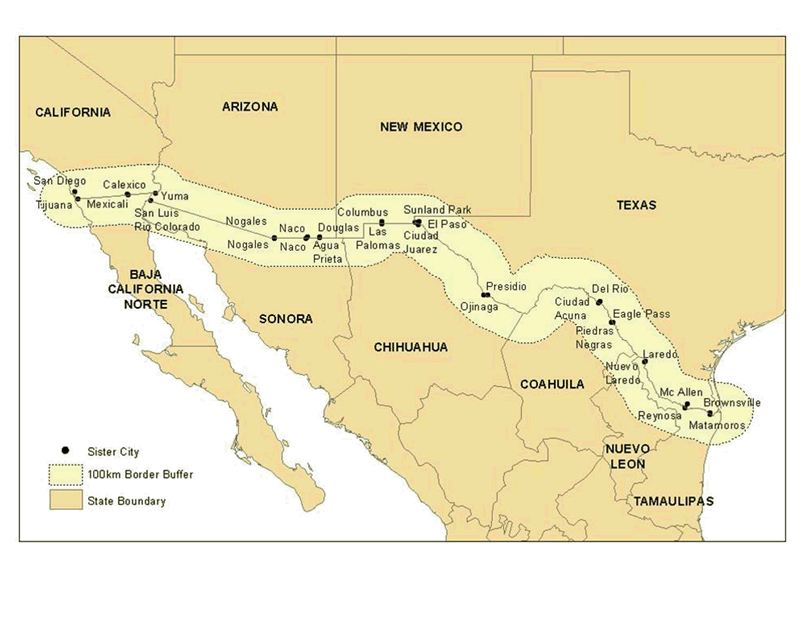
Map of the U.S. – Mexico border region

==== Overview ====
The border region (approximately 2,000 miles (3,200 km) long and 62 miles (100 km) wide) is predominantly arid and contains seven watersheds including the Rio Grande which forms part of the border. The watersheds provide numerous benefits for the 14 cities and over nine million people in the region. However, increasing population, the arid climatic conditions of the region, the nature of economic activities along the rivers, increased trade, and uncontrolled emissions into them have placed tremendous pressure on water resources and threatened natural ecosystems. A large proportion of the population lacks access to clean drinking water and sanitation triggering public health concerns.

==== Policy issues ====
Point source water pollution is a source of concern along the US-Mexico border as pollutants from both countries are entering shared waterways due to agricultural runoff, industrial discharge, and untreated sewage. Various policy issues arise in attempting to deal with this and include:

- Some pollution originates from areas beyond the border region as pollution is carried into the region by the waterways. This makes it difficult to regulate as discharges are difficult to apportion and control.
- Pollution is caused by and affects both countries therefore requiring a joint response.
- The socio-economic differences between the two countries have implications for policy implementation and enforcement.
- Various interests are represented with strong influence from environmental and social groups. Multiple levels of government agencies are also involved.

==== Policy responses ====
There have been several attempts to address environmental concerns in the border region in the past by both governments. Significant intervention, however, resulted from the North American Free Trade Agreement (NAFTA) of 1994 between the U.S., Canada, and Mexico which renewed concerns over the environmental quality of the region due to increased trade in the region. The two governments therefore entered into the US-Mexico Border Environment Cooperation Agreement which created a number of institutions and programs. The Border Environment Cooperation Commission (BECC) and the North American Development Bank (NADB) were created to address border environmental-infrastructure issues and began operation in 2004. Distinct characteristics of these institutions and their approach are that they: are truly bi-national (have members from both countries) at all levels; emphasize a bottom-up approach with enhanced public participation; have a preference to assist disadvantaged communities; avoid regulatory or standard-driven approaches; emphasize economic and environmental sustainability. (As of 2018 the two organizations are in the process of merging into a single entity.)

The US-Mexico Border Program was also created by the agreement and placed under the management of EPA (through its Region 6 and 9 offices) to correct the oversights of previous institutions and give guidance to cross-border environmental policy. The three institutions work together to identify, develop, finance and implement projects in the communities and certify them as "environmentally sustainable" subsequently funding them through a grant-making process. Communities, public, and private entities (sponsors) are invited to submit water and wastewater infrastructure projects. These projects are required to meet certain criteria to qualify for certification and funding. Among other requirements, they have to address an eligible environmental sector; must have a U.S.-side benefit; and have adequate planning, operations and maintenance, and pretreatment provisions. One specific provision touching on point-source water pollution states that "projects where the discharge is directly or indirectly to U.S. side waters, must target achievement of U.S. norms for ambient water quality in U.S. side waters, although infrastructure development may be phased over time. Any flow reductions that result from implementation of non-discharging alternatives must not threaten U.S. or shared ecosystems". Projects receive significant input from the communities living in the region in determining their sustainability. After certification, the project then receives funding from the NADB. As of 2018 NADB has certified 246 projects worth approximately three billion dollars.

The border program has also facilitated direct provision of infrastructure by the federal and state governments such as the construction of wastewater treatment plants, sewer lines, and raw water storage lagoons. One such example is the construction of the Matamoros lift station which is the first phase in eliminating raw sewage discharges into the Rio Grande. Further, the program emphasizes the provision of environmental education and information to communities living in the region.

== See also ==
- Nonpoint source water pollution regulations in the United States
