= Dibenz(a,j)anthracene =

Chemical compound

Dibenz[a,j]anthracene

Names
- Preferred IUPAC name Benzo[m]tetraphene
- Other names 1,2:7,8-Dibenzanthracene

Identifiers
CAS Number	224-41-9
3D model (JSmol)	Interactive image
ChEBI	CHEBI:82438
ChEMBL	ChEMBL24775
ChemSpider	8821
ECHA InfoCard	100.005.390
EC Number	90321
KEGG	C19389
PubChem CID	9176
UNII	M477C74UCX
CompTox Dashboard (EPA)	DTXSID8074811
- InChI: InChI=1S/C22H14/c1-3-7-19-15(5-1)9-11-17-13-18-12-10-16-6-2-4-8-20(16)22(18)14-21(17)19/h1-14H; InChI=1/C22H14/c1-3-7-19-15(5-1)9-11-17-13-18-12-10-16-6-2-4-8-20(16)22(18)14-21(17)19/h1-14H
- SMILES: c35cc2ccc1ccccc1c2cc3c4ccccc4cc5

Properties
Chemical formula	C_{22}H_{14}
Molar mass	278.3466
Appearance	colorless crystals
Melting point	196 °C (385 °F; 469 K)
- Except where otherwise noted, data are given for materials in their standard state (at 25 °C [77 °F], 100 kPa). Infobox references

Dibenz[a,j]anthracene (also known as benzo[m]tetraphene or 1,2:7,8-dibenzanthracene) is an organic compound with the chemical formula C_{22}H_{14}. It belongs to the class of polycyclic aromatic hydrocarbons (PAHs) and is formed whenever there is incomplete combustion of organic matter. The International Agency for Research on Cancer (IARC) has classified it as possibly carcinogenic to humans, grouped into IARC group 2B.

== Description ==
Dibenz[a,j]anthracene is a polycyclic aromatic hydrocarbon with five benzene rings. It has low water solubility and low volatility and therefore occurs predominantly in solid form, bound to particulates in polluted air, soil, or sediment.

== Occurrence ==
Dibenz[a,j]anthracene is generated whenever organic matter or fuel is incompletely burnt or combusted. Examples include industrial emissions such as coke oven operations in the coal and steel industry, coal tar distillation, or within engine exhaust. On a personal level it is produced with high temperature cooking like frying, grilling, broiling, roasting and baking, but also when cigarette smoking or marijuana smoking.

== Health effects ==
As of 2010, the International Agency for Research on Cancer (IARC) has classified dibenz[a,j]anthracene as possibly carcinogenic to humans, grouped into IARC group 2B. No epidemiological studies on human exposure to dibenz[a,j]anthracene as an individual PAH exist, because PAHs always occur as components of complex chemical mixtures and never occur in isolation in the environment. PAHs all have a similar mechanism of causing cancer in both humans and experimental animals whereby they are metabolically converted to oxides and dihydrodiols, and then oxidized to diol epoxides, which react with DNA, inducing mutations.

== In space ==
In February 2014, NASA announced a database for tracking polycyclic aromatic hydrocarbons (PAHs), including dibenz[a,j]anthracene, in the universe. According to scientists, more than 20% of the carbon in the universe may be associated with PAHs, possible starting materials for the formation of life. PAHs seem to have been formed shortly after the Big Bang, are widespread throughout the universe, and are associated with new stars and exoplanets.

== See also ==
- Dibenz[a,h]anthracene
