= Effluent guidelines =

United States standards for wastewater discharges

Effluent Guidelines (also referred to as Effluent Limitation Guidelines (ELGs)) are U.S. national standards for wastewater discharges to surface waters and publicly owned treatment works (POTW) (also called municipal sewage treatment plants). The United States Environmental Protection Agency (EPA) issues Effluent Guideline regulations for categories of industrial sources of water pollution under Title III of the Clean Water Act (CWA). The standards are technology-based, i.e. they are based on the performance of treatment and control technologies (e.g., Best Available Technology). Effluent Guidelines are not based on risk or impacts of pollutants upon receiving waters.

Since the mid-1970s, EPA has promulgated ELGs for 59 industrial categories, with over 450 subcategories. Effluent Guidelines currently control pollution at approximately 40,000 facilities that discharge directly to the nation's waters, 129,000 facilities that discharge to POTWs, and construction sites. Effluent Guidelines are implemented in water discharge permits issued to facilities through the National Pollutant Discharge Elimination System (NPDES).

== Overview ==
Regulated pollutants vary by industry category, with effluent limitations typically expressed as mass loadings or concentrations. The regulations cover pollutants for which there are approved analytical testing methods. EPA has published many methods in its regulations, and has approved the use of other methods published by peer-reviewed sources, such as Standard Methods. Although the effluent limitations are based on the performance of control and treatment technologies (and not the impacts to receiving waters), the regulations do not require discharging facilities to use specific technologies. The facilities may choose any technologies to meet the numerical limitations.

In addition to numerical effluent limitations, some categories also include requirements for the use of industry-specific best management practices.

In the 1972 CWA Congress specified an initial list of categorical regulations that EPA was required to promulgate. The 1977 CWA amendments provided a list of pollutant and pollutant groups to be considered by the agency in developing regulations. EPA is also required to review and revise regulations as needed, and since 1972 it has promulgated ELGs for 59 industrial categories, with over 450 subcategories. Approximately 40,000 facilities that discharge directly to the nation's waters, 129,000 facilities that discharge to POTWs, and construction sites, are covered by the regulations. The regulations annually prohibit the discharge of 700 billion pounds of pollutants into U.S. surface waters.

The effluent limitations for the Construction and Development category are narrative in format and do not specify numeric pollutant limits. The requirements consist of erosion controls and sediment controls, soil stabilization practices and pollution prevention practices (such as minimizing exposure of building materials, pesticides and other chemicals).

In the early years of the program (1970s-1980s) the agency published analytical methods for a list of 126 "priority pollutants," consisting of various toxic pollutants. Subsequently the agency has issued methods and regulated pollutants beyond those in the initial priority list.

Facilities that directly discharge to "waters of the United States" are required to obtain NPDES permits, and effluent guideline requirements are incorporated into these permits. Indirect dischargers (i.e. facilities discharging to POTWs) are subject to effluent guideline requirements called "Pretreatment Standards."

== Existing regulations ==
This table lists the 59 Effluent Guidelines categories published by EPA.

Category Name	40 CFR	Initial Promulgation Year	Most Recent Update
Airport Deicing	449	2012	2012
Aluminum Forming	467	1983	1988
Asbestos Manufacturing	427	1974	1975
Battery Manufacturing	461	1984	1986
Canned and Preserved Fruits and Vegetable Processing	407	1974	1976
Canned and Preserved Seafood (Seafood Processing)	408	1974	1975
Carbon Black Manufacturing	458	1976	1978
Cement Manufacturing	411	1974	1974
Centralized Waste Treatment	437	2000	2003
Coal Mining	434	1975	2002
Coil Coating	465	1982	1983
Concentrated Animal Feeding Operations	412	1974	2008
Concentrated Aquatic Animal Production (Aquaculture)	451	2004	2004
Construction and Development	450	2009	2014
Copper Forming	468	1983	1986
Dairy Products Processing	405	1974	1974
Dental Office	441	2017	2017
Electrical and Electronic Components	469	1983	1983
Electroplating	413	1974	1983
Explosives Manufacturing	457	1976	1976
Ferroalloy Manufacturing	424	1974	1974
Fertilizer Manufacturing	418	1974	1975
Glass Manufacturing	426	1974	1975
Grain Mills	406	1974	1974
Gum and Wood Chemicals Manufacturing	454	1976	1976
Hospitals	460	1976	1976
Ink Formulating	447	1975	1975
Inorganic Chemicals Manufacturing	415	1982	1984
Iron and Steel Manufacturing	420	1974	2005
Landfills	445	2000	2000
Leather Tanning and Finishing	425	1982	1996
Meat and Poultry Products	432	1974	2004
Metal Finishing	433	1983	1986
Metal Molding and Casting (Foundries)	464	1985	1985
Metal Products and Machinery	438	2003	2003
Mineral Mining and Processing	436	1975	1979
Nonferrous Metals Forming and Metal Powders	471	1985	1989
Nonferrous Metals Manufacturing	421	1976	1990
Oil and Gas Extraction	435	1975	2016
Ore Mining and Dressing (Hard Rock Mining)	440	1975	1988
Organic Chemicals, Plastics & Synthetic Fibers	414	1987	1993
Paint Formulating	446	1975	1975
Paving and Roofing Materials (Tars and Asphalt)	443	1975	1975
Pesticide Chemicals	455	1978	1996
Petroleum Refining	419	1974	1982
Pharmaceutical Manufacturing	439	1976	2003
Phosphate Manufacturing	422	1974	1974
Photographic	459	1976	1976
Plastics Molding and Forming	463	1984	1984
Porcelain Enameling	466	1982	1985
Pulp, Paper and Paperboard	430	1974	2002
Rubber Manufacturing	428	1974	1974
Soap and Detergent Manufacturing	417	1974	1975
Steam Electric Power Generating	423	1974	2024
Sugar Processing	409	1974	1979
Textile Mills	410	1974	1982
Timber Products Processing	429	1974	1981
Transportation Equipment Cleaning	442	2000	2000
Waste Combustors	444	2000	2000

=== Effluent Guidelines Database ===
The EPA database supports searching of existing regulations by industry, pollutant, treatment technology or keyword.

== Program plans ==
EPA periodically publishes a list of ongoing and new regulation projects, and a list of categories that it is considering for regulation, in its "Effluent Guidelines Program Plan." Program Plan 15, published in January 2023, announced several regulatory and research projects. According to the agency's "PFAS Strategic Roadmap", it is continuing to evaluate options to reduce discharges of per- and polyfluoroalkyl substances (PFAS) from a variety of industrial sectors. In this regard EPA has decided that changes to the Landfills regulation (40 CFR part 445) are necessary, to address discharges of PFAS from landfill leachate.

EPA will conduct research on the Textile Mills category (40 CFR part 410) to learn more about its PFAS usage and discharge characteristics. The agency will study PFAS discharged to POTWs by various industries, including categories that have recently been examined. EPA intends to confirm the origins of PFAS wastewater and assist POTWs in determining whether source-level controls are necessary. The Concentrated Animal Feeding Operations Category (40 CFR part 412) will also be investigated. The POTW influent study will include monitoring of the Electrical and Electronic Components Category (40 CFR part 469) for PFAS discharge data even though EPA is not currently seeking additional action for this category. Additionally, EPA will keep an eye on PFAS use and emissions from airports and the Pulp, Paper, and Paperboard Category (40 CFR part 430).

== See also ==
- Industrial wastewater treatment
- New Source Performance Standard
- United States regulation of point source water pollution
- Water Quality Standards Program (Risk-based standards)
