= Pentaphene =

- Skeletal formula of pentaphene

Names
- Preferred IUPAC name Pentaphene
- Other names: Dibenzo[b,h]phenanthrene; 2,3:6,7-Dibenzphenanthrene

Identifiers
CAS Number	222-93-5
3D model (JSmol)	Interactive image
Beilstein Reference	2051200
ChEBI	CHEBI:33147
ChemSpider	453521
ECHA InfoCard	100.005.389
EC Number	205-927-6
PubChem CID	519935
UNII	IF94R180Q0
CompTox Dashboard (EPA)	DTXSID90176743
- InChI: InChI=1S/C22H14/c1-3-7-17-13-21-19(11-15(17)5-1)9-10-20-12-16-6-2-4-8-18(16)14-22(20)21/h1-14H Key: JQQSUOJIMKJQHS-UHFFFAOYSA-N
- SMILES: C=1C=CC=2C=C3C(C=CC=4C=C5C=CC=CC5=CC43)=CC2C1

Properties
Chemical formula	C_{22}H_{14}
Molar mass	278.354 g·mol^{−1}
Appearance	greenish-yellow solid
Density	1.2 g/cm^{3}
Melting point	275 °C (527 °F; 548 K)
Boiling point	524 °C (975 °F; 797 K)
Solubility in water	insoluble
- Except where otherwise noted, data are given for materials in their standard state (at 25 °C [77 °F], 100 kPa). Infobox references

Pentaphene is a polycyclic aromatic hydrocarbon consisting of five linearly fused benzene rings. The compound is a structural isomer of the more common pentacene, from which it differs by the arrangement of its rings. While pentacene has a linear acene structure, pentaphene is a peri-fused compound, with an angular fusion along the five-ring structure. Its chemical formula is C_{22}H_{14}.

== Structure ==
Pentaphene structure can be visualized as a naphthalene core with additional benzene rings fused in a V-shape manner. This angular geometry contrasts with the fully linear, rod-like shape of its isomer, pentacene.

== Synthesis ==
The compound can be prepared from o-benzylbenzoic acid in a six-step synthesis.

Also, pentaphene can be prepared via 1,2-anthracyne, through a multi-step synthesis.

== Physical properties ==
The greenish-yellow compound is insoluble in water or ethanol, but soluble in nonpolar organic solvents, such as xylene and diethyl ether. Under UV light, penthaphene exhibits intense blue fluorescence.

== Uses ==
This compound is of significant interest in the fields of organic electronics, materials science, and theoretical chemistry due to its unique electronic structure and photophysical properties.
