= Effluent limitation =

An effluent limitation is a United States Clean Water Act standard of performance reflecting a specified level of discharge reduction achievable by the best available technology or related standards for various sources of water pollution. These sources include all industries, businesses, municipal sewage treatment plants and storm sewer systems, and other facilities that discharge to surface waters. Effluent limitations are implemented in discharge permits issued by the Environmental Protection Agency (EPA) and state agencies, through the National Pollutant Discharge Elimination System (NPDES).

== See also ==
- Effluent
- Effluent guidelines (national industrial wastewater regulations)
- United States regulation of point source water pollution
