= Dibenz(a,h)anthracene =

Dibenz[a,h]anthracene

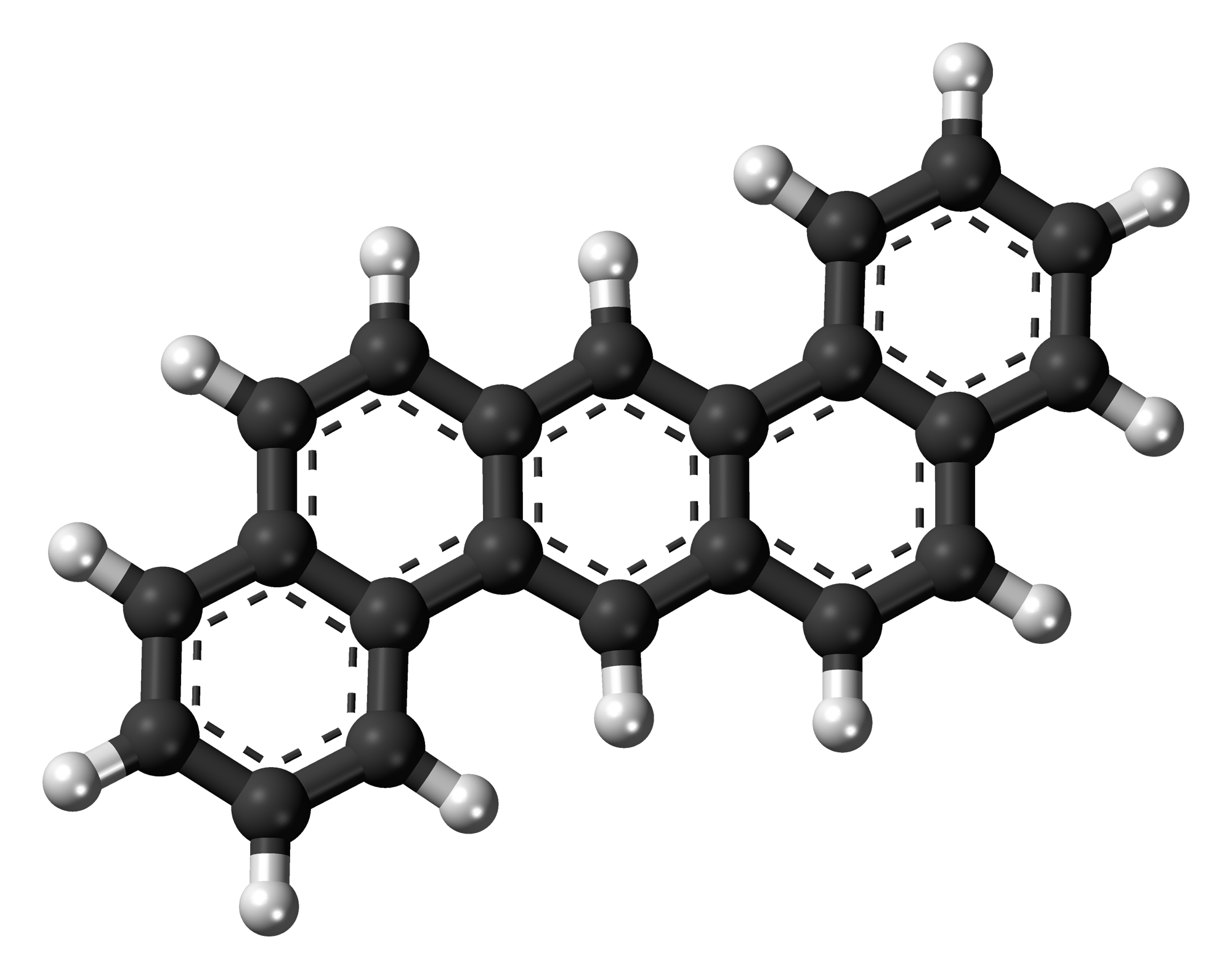

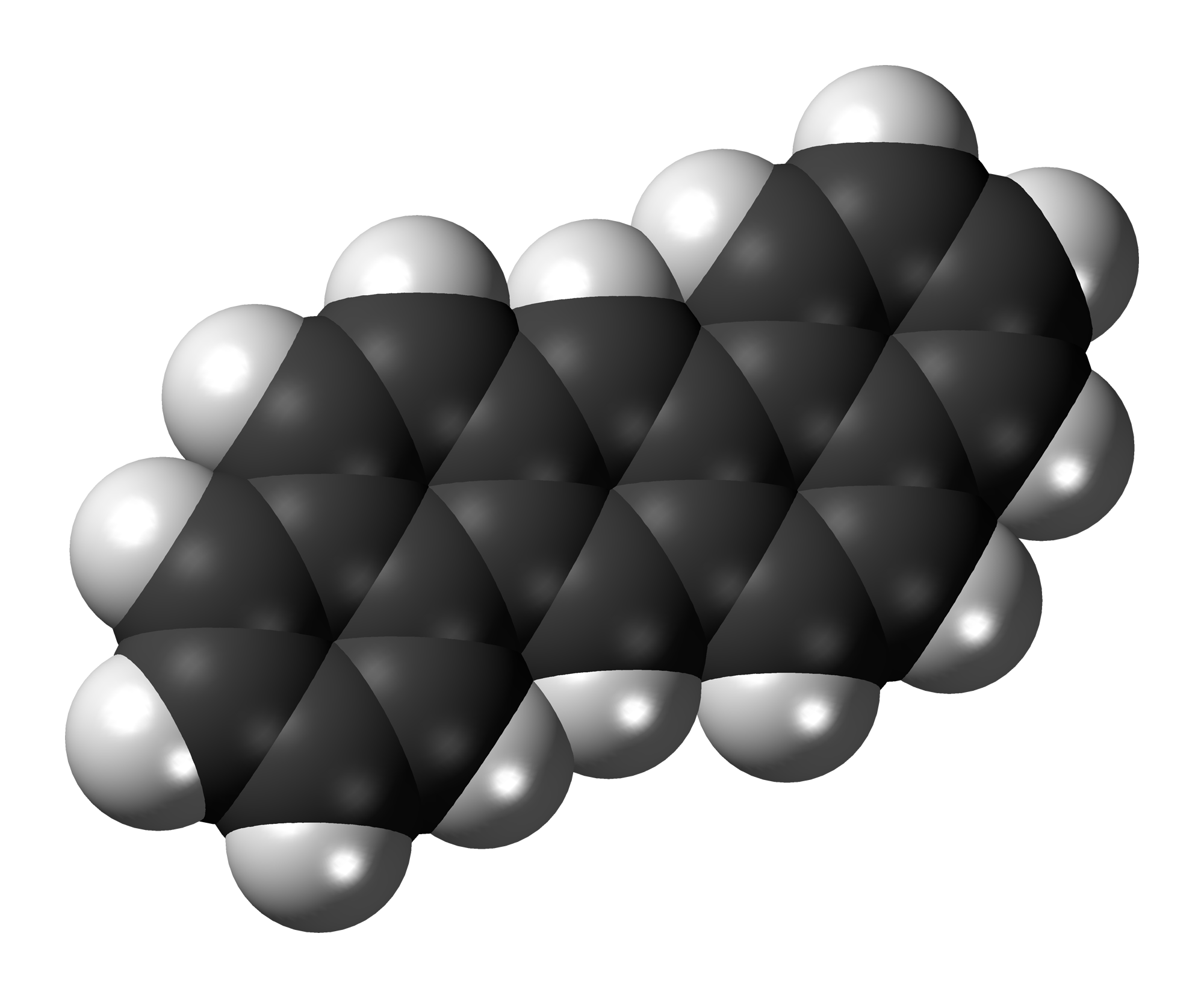

Names
- Preferred IUPAC name Benzo[k]tetraphene
- Other names 1,2:5,6-Dibenzanthracene

Identifiers
CAS Number	53-70-3
3D model (JSmol)	Interactive image
ChEBI	CHEBI:35299
ChEMBL	ChEMBL1346946
ChemSpider	5678
ECHA InfoCard	100.000.166
EC Number	200-181-8
KEGG	C14325
PubChem CID	5889
RTECS number	HN2625000
UNII	T30ELH3D5X
UN number	3077
CompTox Dashboard (EPA)	DTXSID9020409
- InChI: InChI=1/C22H14/c1-3-7-19-15(5-1)9-11-17-14-22-18(13-21(17)19)12-10-16-6-2-4-8-20(16)22/h1-14H
- SMILES: c1ccc2c(c1)ccc3c2cc4ccc5ccccc5c4c3

Properties
Chemical formula	C_{22}H_{14}
Molar mass	278.354 g·mol^{−1}
Density	1.232 g/cm^{3}
Melting point	262 °C (504 °F; 535 K)

Hazards
- GHS labelling
Pictograms	(GHS08: Health hazard) (GHS09: Environmental hazard)
Signal word	Danger
Hazard statements	H350, H410
Precautionary statements	P201, P202, P273, P281, P308+P313, P391, P405, P501
- Except where otherwise noted, data are given for materials in their standard state (at 25 °C [77 °F], 100 kPa). Infobox references

A sample of Dibenzanthracene

Dibenz[a,h]anthracene, Benzo[k]tetraphene or 1,2:5,6-Dibenzanthracene is an organic compound with the chemical formula C_{22}H_{14}. It is a polycyclic aromatic hydrocarbon (PAH) made of five fused benzene rings. It is a fused five-ringed PAH which is common as a pollutant of smoke and oils. It is stable and highly genotoxic in bacterial and mammalian cell systems, as it intercalates into DNA and causes mutations.

== Description ==
Dibenz[a,h]anthracene is a polycyclic aromatic hydrocarbon with five benzene rings. It has low water solubility and low volatility and therefore occurs predominantly in solid form, white to light yellow crystalline, bound to particulates in polluted air, soil, or sediment. It was first synthesized in 1918.

== Occurrence ==
Dibenz[a,h]anthracene is generated whenever organic matter or fuel is incompletely burnt or combusted. Examples include industrial emissions such as coke oven operations in the coal and steel industry, coal tar distillation, or within engine exhaust. On a personal level it is produced with high temperature cooking like frying, grilling, broiling, roasting and baking, but also when cigarette smoking or marijuana smoking.

== Health effects ==
As of 2010, dibenz[a,h]anthracene has been classified as probably carcinogenic to humans, grouped into IARC group 2A. No epidemiological studies on human exposure to dibenz[a,h]anthracene as an individual PAH exists, because PAHs always occur as components of complex chemical mixtures and never occur in isolation in the environment.

== See also ==
- Dibenz[a,j]anthracene
