= Water pollution in the United States =

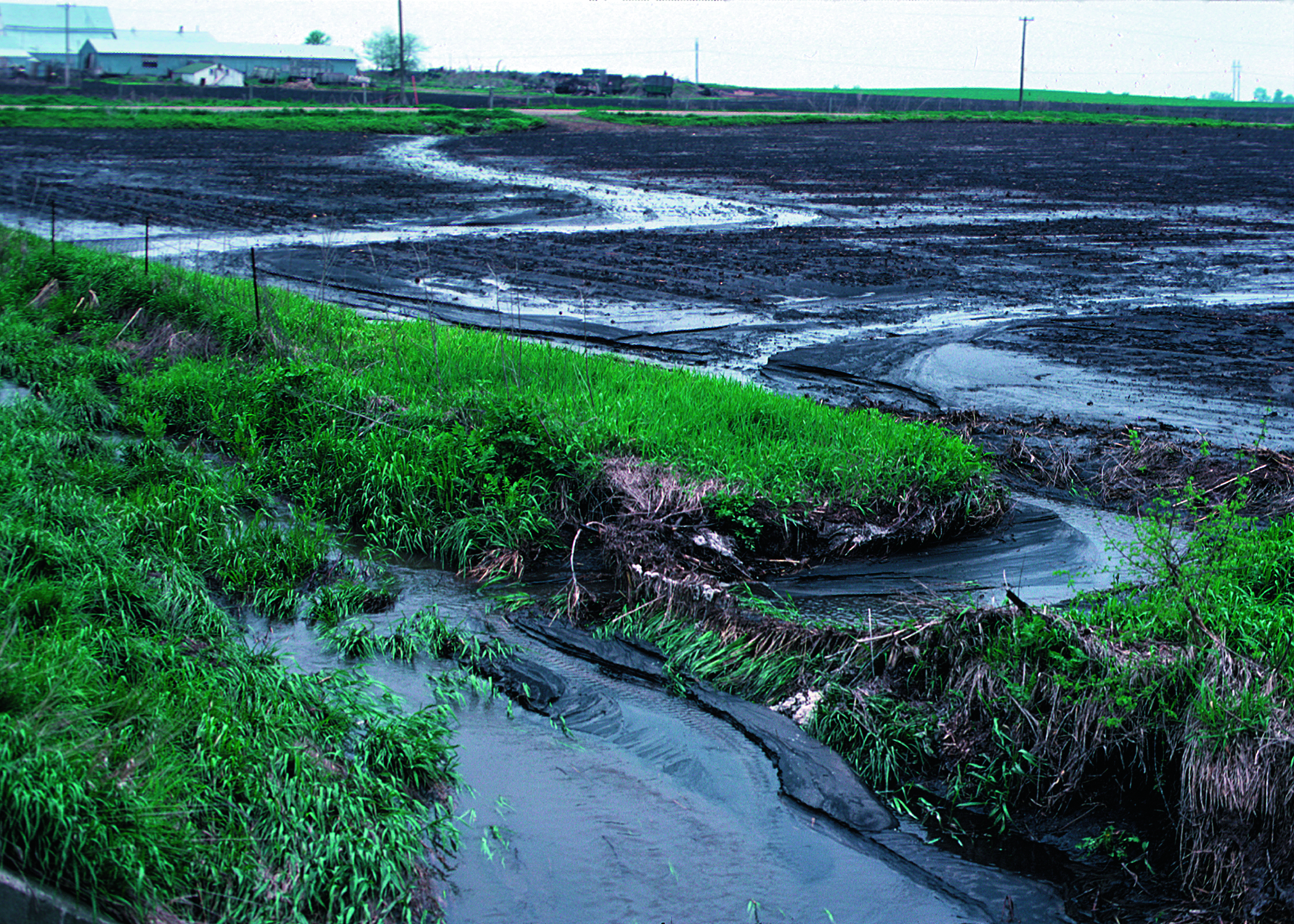
Topsoil runoff from farm, central Iowa (2011)

Water pollution in the United States is a growing problem that became critical in the 19th century with the development of mechanized agriculture, mining, and manufacturing industries—although laws and regulations introduced in the late 20th century have improved water quality in many water bodies. Extensive industrialization and rapid urban growth exacerbated water pollution combined with a lack of regulation has allowed for discharges of sewage, toxic chemicals, nutrients, and other pollutants into surface water. This has led to the need for more improvement in water quality as it is still threatened and not fully safe.

In the early 20th century, communities began to install drinking water treatment systems, but control of the principal pollution sources—domestic sewage, industry, and agriculture—was not effectively regulated in the US until the 1970s. These pollution sources can affect both groundwater and surface water. Multiple pollution incidents such as the Kingston Fossil Plant coal fly ash slurry spill (2008) and the Deepwater Horizon oil spill (2010) have left lasting impacts on water quality, ecosystems, and public health in the United States. The United States Geological Survey (USGS) reported in 2023 that at least 45% of drinking water in the United States contains per- and polyfluoroalkyl substances (PFAS), commonly referred to as "forever chemicals." The Environmental Protection Agency (EPA) has been able to identify around 70,000 water bodies that do not meet revised water quality standards due to PFAS.

Many solutions to water pollution in the United States can be implemented to curtail water pollution: municipal wastewater treatment, agricultural and industrial wastewater treatment, erosion and sediment control, and the control of urban runoff. The continued implementation of pollution prevention, control, and treatment measures are used to pursue the goal of maintaining water quality within levels specified in federal and state regulations; however, many water bodies across the country continue to violate water quality standards in the 21st century.

== Overview ==
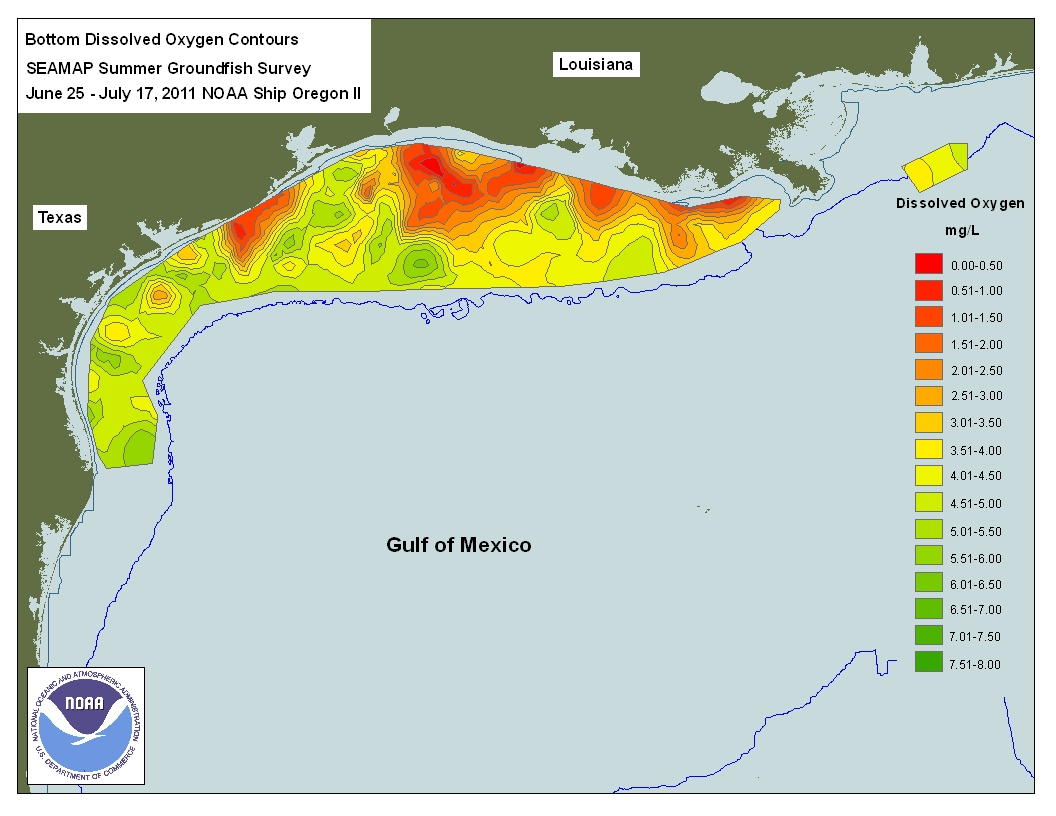
Dead zone in the Gulf of Mexico

Water pollution was identified as a growing problem in the US by scientists, government officials and the public in the 19th century. During that era many cities and towns piped their untreated domestic sewage into nearby waterways. Wastewater discharged by factories, mines and other businesses increased as the economy expanded. Large cities, and later smaller communities, began to install drinking water treatment systems in the early 20th century, but sewage treatment plants were limited at that time and not very effective. Effective control of sewage and industrial pollution was not comprehensively addressed until later in the century. Agricultural pollution emerged as a growing problem in the 20th century with the increased mechanization of agriculture and increasing use of chemicals.

Following the passage of the 1972 Clean Water Act (CWA), the levels of water pollution in US waterways generally have experienced a dramatic decrease with respect to sewage outflow and many types of industrial wastewater. The 1972 law didn't address surface runoff from farms or urban runoff pollution. Municipal stormwater runoff became subject to federal regulation in 1987, although implementation of the requirements by cities and towns has been a slow and difficult process. About half of U.S. stream and river miles continue to violate federal water quality standards in the 21st century. Surveys of lakes, ponds and reservoirs indicated that about 70 percent were impaired (measured on a surface area basis), and a little more than 70 percent of the nation's coastlines, and 90 percent of the surveyed ocean and near coastal areas were also impaired. A related 2017 EPA report on the nation's water quality stated that 46% of river and stream miles, 21% of the nation's lakes, 18% of coastal and Great Lakes waters, and 32% of the nation's wetland areas are in "poor biological condition." In the 21st century many water bodies continue to be degraded by discharges from agriculture, certain industries, and urban runoff, which often leads to environmental and human health risks.

While the CWA has helped improve water quality in many areas of the United States, the law does not fully address all aspects of pollution. Many think that Congress should revise or expand the law to address these problems and gaps in regulation. Although the CWA has been effective in controlling point source pollution (where the discharge is typically via a pipe or ditch and assigning responsibility for mitigation is straightforward), it has not been as effective with nonpoint sources (where discharges are diffuse, and treatment or prevention may be technically difficult or very expensive).

Despite the negative health and ecosystem impacts of water pollution, solutions exist that are able to treat and decrease pollution levels in water bodies.

== Types ==
=== Surface water pollution ===
Surface water consists of all forms of visible water sources, such as oceans, lakes, and rivers. Currently, a significant percentage of surface freshwater sources are polluted in the United States. This poses a huge threat to American water sources because over 60% of water used in the United States is from these freshwater sources. A majority of freshwater contamination cases are a result of nutrient pollution, which is the result of farm waste and fertilizer entering water bodies, creating zones with depleted oxygen levels.

=== Groundwater pollution ===
Groundwater is rainfall that collects in porous spaces deep underground, which are called aquifers. Humans can access the water that collects in an aquifer by building wells to pump the water to the surface for use. About 40% of drinking water in America comes from groundwater sources. When contaminants enter aquifers, the pollution spreads, eliminating the potential to use the aquifer for drinking water. Groundwater contamination is often the result of chemicals that seep through the soil and into the water supply, such as pesticides and fertilizers. Other causes of contamination in groundwater includes gasoline, oil, road salts, septic tank waste, or leakage from landfills.

== Categories of pollution sources ==
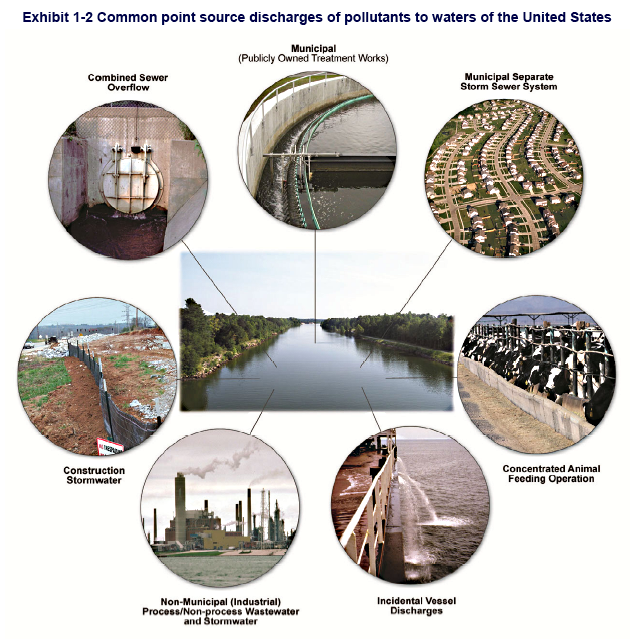
Water pollution point sources

=== Point source ===
Point source pollution occurs when water pollution contamination comes from a single source. Point sources could include leaking septic tanks, oil spills, dumping of waste, or wastewater treatment facilities. To prevent point source pollution from occurring, the Clean Water Act regulates what can be discharged into a water body by requiring each facility to obtain a National Pollutant Discharge Elimination System (NPDES) permit.

=== Nonpoint source ===
Nonpoint source pollution occurs when the contamination derives from multiple different sources. This type of pollution is very challenging to manage given that the original source(s) may be difficult to identify. Nonpoint source pollution is the most common type of pollution because as rainfall runs off of land on its path to different water sources, it becomes contaminated by pollutants from the surrounding area. These sources include agriculture related pollutants, urban runoff, or drainage. The CWA does not authorize the issuance of NPDES permits for nonpoint sources.

=== Trans-boundary sources ===
Trans-boundary water pollution occurs when pollution in one country's waters spreads and damages another country's environment or water supply. Trans-boundary pollution can travel through rivers or ocean currents. This means that this type of pollution is not contained within the boundaries of a nation. Trans-boundary pollution can allow pollution to travel across large distances because of how it accesses natural waterways.

== Causes of pollution ==
=== Municipal sewage ===
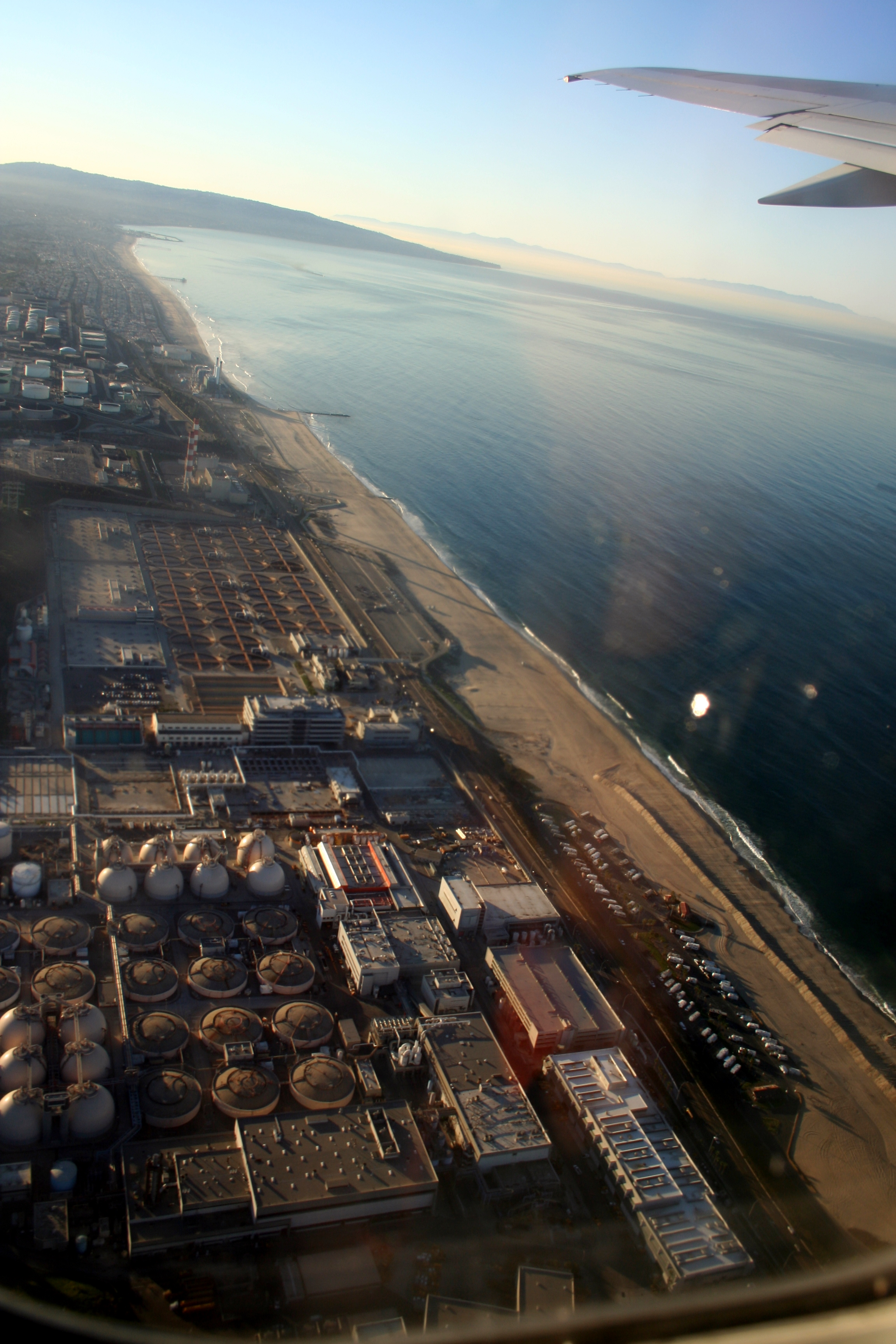
The Hyperion Water Reclamation Plant serves the Los Angeles metropolitan area.

Historically, municipal sewage was a major contributor of water pollution across the United States. The lack of proper treatment of sewage resulted in many contaminated water bodies across the country. Domestic sewage became a widespread problem with the onset of the industrial revolution in the 19th century, population growth, and increasing urbanization. Through the early 20th century, most communities had no sewage treatment plants or waste disposal sites. Some cities built sewer pipes which carried their sewage to a nearby river or coastal area, but lacked any treatment of the wastes, instead depositing the sewage directly into the water. The first wastewater treatment plants were built in the late 19th and early 20th centuries in the United States and typically didn't fully treat the waste.

The extensive construction of new and upgraded sewage treatment systems following the passage of the 1972 Clean Water Act has greatly reduced the impacts of municipal discharges. Since the 1980s secondary treatment has been the national standard for municipalities. Since these advancements, the United States has been able to process around 34 billion gallons of wastewater per day. Some individual systems continue to cause localized water quality problems due to outdated or leaking piping and collection systems, leading to combined sewer overflows and sanitary sewer overflows. Poor upkeep of sewer infrastructure results in contamination from leaks, and such practices contributed to a rating from the American Society of Civil Engineers of a "D" grade for America's wastewater infrastructure in 2017. While all domestic wastewater is now treated nationwide, leaks and spills of municipal sewage pose a significant problem because wastewater carries diseases like salmonella, hepatitis, and many other infectious diseases that roughly sickens 3.5 million Americans every year.

Sewage is not a waste product and it can be converted into wealth economically in a circular economy by using the aquatic life cycle of mosquitoes and non-biting midges. Organic matter in the sewage is consumed and transformed as adult mosquitoes and midges which can be used as fish/poultry meal.

=== Urban runoff ===
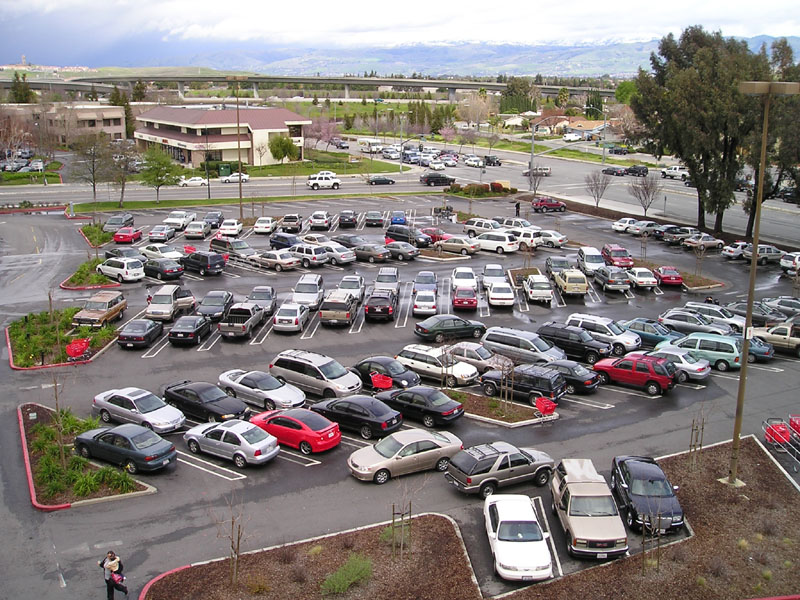
Parking lots, roads and buildings are major sources of urban runoff.

Water research during the late 1970s and 1980s indicated that stormwater runoff was a significant cause of water quality impairment in many parts of the US. Research on stormwater pollution continues in the 21st century, with findings that urban runoff is an ongoing source of water quality problems nationwide. Increased land development throughout the country—in both cities and suburbs—has led to an increase in impervious surfaces (parking lots, roads, buildings, compacted soil), which generates increased surface runoff during wet weather. The development of new roads and hardscape surfaces continue to contribute to the pollution of nearby rivers, lakes, and coastal areas. Typical runoff pollutants include gasoline, oil and other motor vehicle fluids; metals; fertilizers; pesticides and other chemicals.

=== Industrial pollution ===
Early indications of pollution from industrial waste in the United States existed since the 1870s, increasing as the Industrial Revolution and Second Industrial Revolution expanded throughout the United States and its environmental impacts were observed more frequently. Industrial wastes contribute toxic pollutants and chemicals and can have detrimental ecosystem and public health impacts if discharged directly into surface water.

==== Growth of industrialization and industrial waste ====
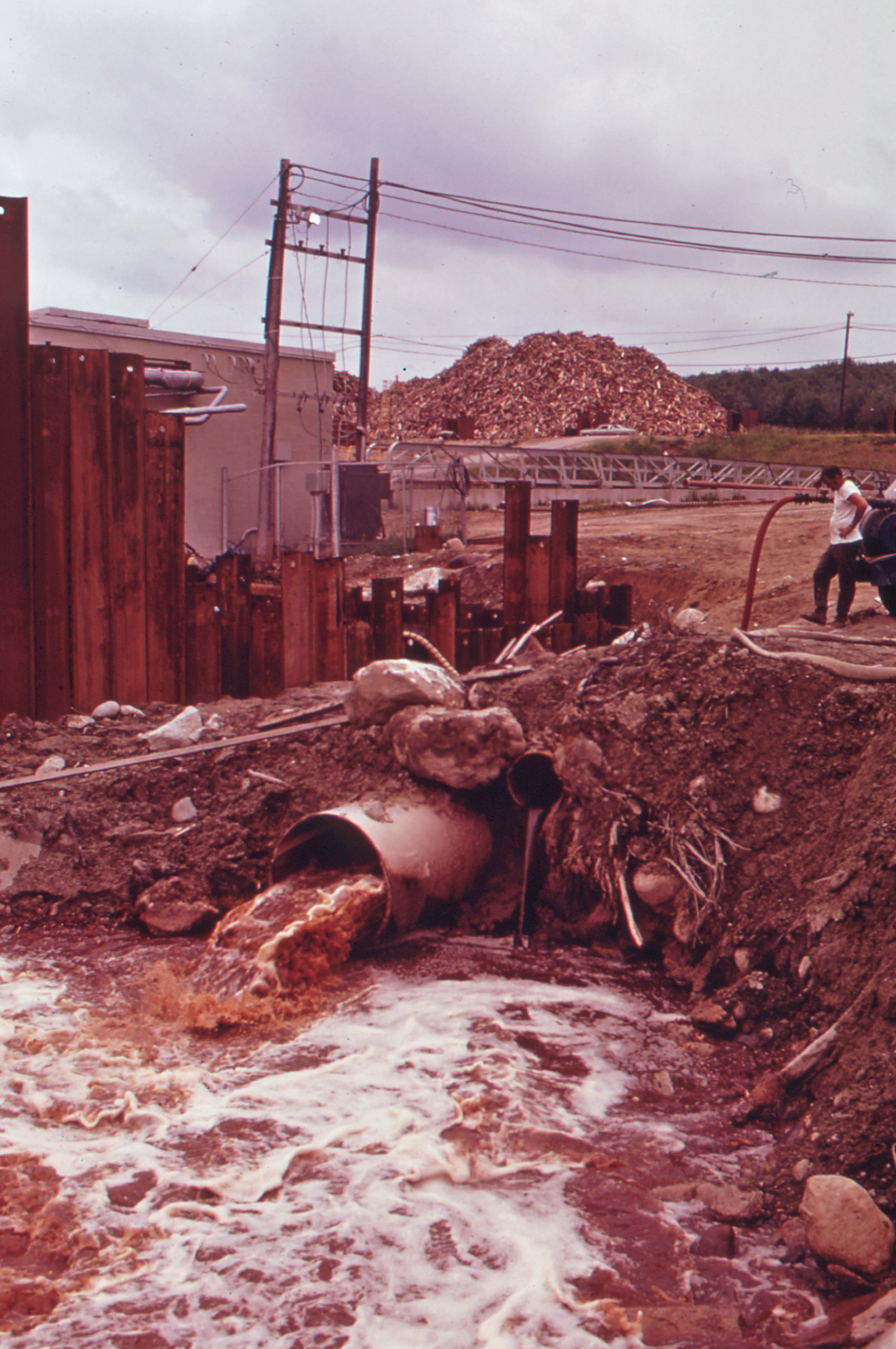
Discharge from a paper mill in Jay, Maine in 1973

Historical accounts of early industrial activity in the US provide a general description of the kinds of waste generated. Mining operations (coal, metals, minerals), iron forges, and blast furnaces were some of the early industries in the U.S. that generated waste. In the late 18th and early 19th centuries, wastes from mining operations entered rivers and streams, and iron bloomeries and furnaces used water for cooling. These industries were relatively small businesses generating small amounts of product, and the wastes they discharged to rivers and streams were proportionately dilute. However, as factories grew in the 19th century, so did the quantity of pollution produced. In the early 19th century, the introduction of steam engines in both the mining and manufacturing sectors (such as textiles) greatly expanded productivity, and increased use of the engines generated larger volumes of heated water (thermal pollution). The productivity gains, along with the introduction of railroads in the 1830s and 1840s—which increased the overall demand for coal and minerals—led to additional generation of wastes.

The volumes and concentrations of industrial wastes increased significantly in the mid-19th century in multiple business sectors, including mining. Mining wastes were increasing, not only from coal and mineral mines in the east and south, but from mining of gold, silver and other metals in the newly developing west.

The onset of the Second Industrial Revolution in the mid-to-late 19th century introduced new heavy industries in the US, generating larger volumes and new kinds of wastes. These industries included:

- oil and gas extraction
- petroleum refineries
- iron and steel, with new manufacturing processes developed in the 1850s–1860s that generated new kinds of toxic chemical wastes
- manufacturing (smelting) of non-ferrous metals such as copper, zinc, lead and aluminium
- rubber manufacturing
- fertilizers and chemicals (late 19th century).

Industrial expansion continued into the 20th century, including large-scale expansion of paper products manufacturing, which produced additional types and quantities of wastes.

==== Modern day industrial waste ====
Today, industrial pollution is caused by discharges and emissions from manufacturing plants in certain industries, which continues to pollute surface waters nationwide. Many manufacturing processes generate wastewater, contributing to the water pollution found in rivers, lakes, and oceans. In 2015 the EPA found that fossil-fuel power stations, particularly coal-fired plants were the largest contributors of industrial water pollution. EPA found instances where power plants discharged toxic pollutants, such as mercury, arsenic, and lead into surface waters. Although many industrial facilities have added or expanded their wastewater treatment systems to comply with the CWA, certain industrial sectors and facilities have not addressed all components in their discharges and continue to contribute significant quantities of pollutants to surface waters in the US.

Based on a report of 21,393 industrial and commercial facilities subject to the EPA Toxics Release Inventory (TRI) system, discharges of toxic pollutants in 2019 totaled about 200 million pounds (91 kt), a decrease of 38 million pounds (17 kt) (16% reduction) from 2007, mostly due to reduced nitrate discharges. (TRI reports do not cover all industries or all pollutants discharged.)

Per- and polyfluoroalkyl substances (PFAS) are a group of synthetic chemical compounds that pose significant health and environmental concerns. They are widely used in modern manufacturing and are highly resistant to degradation, which has led to their branding as "forever chemicals". Humans and animals are commonly exposed to PFAS through water and food consumption. A 2023 USGS study reported that nearly half of the tap water in the United States is contaminated with PFAS. Research on the full health impacts of PFAS is ongoing. Studies have shown that exposure to PFAS may lead to increased cholesterol, immune system impairment, increased risk of certain cancers, and a variety of reproductive and developmental problems.

=== Agricultural pollution ===
Discharges and chemicals from agriculture greatly contributes to water pollution in the US, as rainwater flows through fields and into bodies of water. The application of chemical fertilizers, collection of animal manure, and use of chemicals used by farmers often results in surface runoff of nutrients (nitrogen and phosphorus). When washed away from farm fields, nutrient pollution can cause eutrophication of water bodies. Eutrophication results in algal blooms which deplete oxygen in bodies of water, resulting in dead zones where life can no longer be sustained. Excessive use or improper use of fertilizers, pesticides, and various types of chemicals during farming contribute to water pollution, and are currently the third largest source for water pollution in lakes, second largest source of water pollution in wetlands, and a major contributor to pollution in estuaries and ground water.

There are approximately 45,000 animal feeding operation facilities, also known as factory farms, in the US. These facilities keep and feed millions of animals and produce billions of gallons of animal waste per year. In 2012 the factory farms produced 369 million tons of animal waste, typically stored in lagoons or tanks. Depending on the type of container used, the storage systems may leak and discharge bacteria, ammonia and nutrients to nearby streams. Storage lagoons may also leak into groundwater.

=== Air deposition ===
Air pollution is also a major contributor to surface water pollution. The type of pollutants in the air emitted by industrial facilities, motor vehicles, and agricultural bio-waste released to the atmosphere affect the quality of marine and fresh water bodies, thus affecting marine life, plants, animals, and ultimately human survival.

Air deposition is a process whereby air pollutants emitted from sources, either industrial or natural, settle into water bodies. The deposition may lead to polluted water near the source, or at distances up to a few thousand miles away. The most frequently observed water pollutants resulting from industrial air deposition are sulfur compounds, nitrogen compounds, mercury compounds, other heavy metals, and some pesticides and industrial by-products. Natural sources of air deposition include forest fires and microbial activity.

Acid rain is a form of air deposition in which industrial facilities and motor vehicles emit gases such as nitrogen oxide, which interact with water vapor and then fall into water bodies, as well as on land. The acid rain drains all the important nutrients, such as oxygen, from the water and soil, causing harm to marine life. It is detrimental to animals and humans and reduces the ability of plants to reproduce.

=== Invasive Species ===
The proliferation of some invasive species contributes towards water pollution. The negative impact of invasive species is not limited to land; many species, flora and fauna alike, also degrade water quality. Overabundance of a non-native species can lead to the decline of the diversity of native species in a waterway. Several examples of invasive species that contribute to the degradation of water quality are listed below.

Nutria are small mammals that were introduced to the southern United States in the 1800s for fur trading. Since their introduction, nutria have reproduced to form large populations, leading to water pollution and erosion. Nutria contamination occurs through feces and urine, both of which house nematodes, blood flukes, liver flukes, and tapeworms. These contaminants spread and pollute water sources. Nutria burrow into levees and other flood control systems, weakening them, as well as eroding the banks of streams and rivers.

The zebra mussel attaches to native mussel species and prevents them from moving, eating and reproducing. Zebra mussels reproduce quickly and their population outcompetes native mussel species in waterways. Zebra mussels are efficient siphon feeders and clear water of plankton, thus altering the food web for other species feeding on plankton. This removal of particulates in the water lessens water turbidity and the resulting clearer water allows for predators to more easily identify prey.

The large freshwater grass carp was introduced to the United States and Europe for weed control. As populations expand, the grass carp over eat native aquatic vegetation; reduction in vegetation can lead to algal blooms. The spread of algae has the potential to release harmful toxins into certain waterways.

Giant salvinia is an aquatic fern that proliferates on the water surface. In abundance, giant salvinia blocks out sunlight and lowers dissolved oxygen levels, harming native plants and animals that depend on dissolved oxygen. Giant salvinia pollutes water further by dying, decomposing, and lower oxygen levels further still.

=== Other causes ===
Other activities that contribute to water pollution include:

- Accidental leaks and spills from chemical handling, such as petroleum
- Household disposal of products and chemicals that enter nearby water bodies
- Spills of oil used for transportation.

== Solutions ==
=== Municipal wastewater treatment ===
Municipal wastewater (sewage) is composed of human waste and other residential waste streams. In the United States, approximately 34 billion gallons of wastewater are collected every day and sent to sewage treatment plants. Wastewater is collected through combined sewers, which are used for sanitary waste and stormwater runoff, or in separate sanitary sewers. Sewage treatment plants include physical removal processes, such as screens and settling tanks, and biological processes to remove organic matter and pathogens from water. Treatment plants have strict permit requirements to ensure that their discharges will not cause harm to the environment or public health. Some plants have enhanced treatment processes to control nutrient pollution before discharge.

=== Agricultural wastewater treatment ===
Agricultural run-off is one of the leading causes of water pollution in the United States. Funding from Clean Water Grants are available to farmers to install projects to help control agricultural pollution before it enters water sources. Methods to minimize and contain water pollution from agriculture in the United States include watershed efforts, nutrient management, cover crops, buffers, management of livestock waste, and drainage management. Buffers are small strips of land covered in plants that are able to remove pollutants such as nitrogen, phosphorus, and sediment prior to discharge in a water body. Both buffers and crop covers are used to remove these pollutants from agricultural runoff.

=== Industrial wastewater treatment ===
Industrial facilities may generate the following industrial wastewater flows:

- Manufacturing process waste streams, which can include conventional pollutants (i.e. controllable with secondary treatment systems), toxic pollutants (e.g. solvents, heavy metals), and other harmful compounds such as nutrients
- Non-process waste streams: boiler blowdown and cooling water, which produce thermal pollution and other pollutants
- Industrial site drainage, generated both by manufacturing facilities, service industries and energy and mining sites
- Waste streams from the energy and mining sectors: acid mine drainage, produced water from oil and gas extraction, radionuclides
- Waste streams that are by-products of treatment or cooling processes: backwashing (water treatment), brine.

Some facilities generate wastewater that can be treated in municipal sewage treatment plants. Most industrial processes, such as petroleum refineries, chemical and petrochemical plants have their own specialized facilities to treat their wastewater. Such specialized systems are designed to treat high concentrations of organic matter (e.g. oil and grease), toxic pollutants (e.g. heavy metals, volatile organic compounds) or nutrients such as ammonia. Some industries install a pre-treatment system to remove some pollutants (e.g., toxic compounds), and then discharge the partially treated wastewater to the municipal sewer system.

=== Erosion and sediment control ===
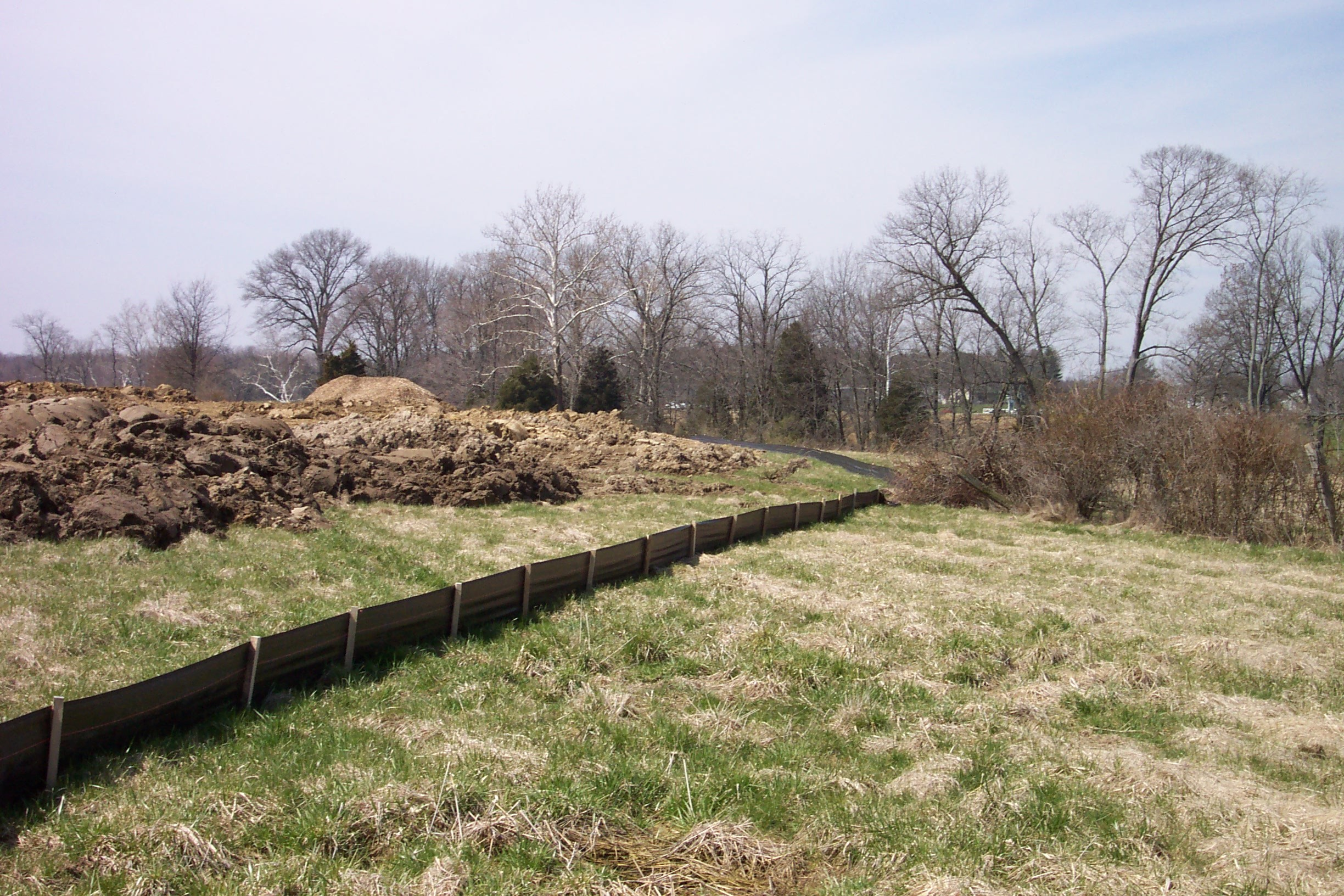
A silt fence used for sediment control

Erosion and sediment controls are techniques used to mitigate sediment pollution in waterways. The most common and efficient control method on agricultural land is crop management, which increases soil cover and stabilizes slopes to prevent erosion. Planting cover crops, rotating the crops cultivated in each field, and leaving crop residue in place after cultivation can all improve soil retention. Without proper soil stabilization techniques, rainfall can cause large quantities of sediment to be washed away into waterways, creating issues with sunlight penetration and visibility. Typical preventive measures for construction sites include erosion control matting and mulching, and installation of silt fences to trap sediment not captured by the erosion controls.

=== Control of urban run-off ===
Urban areas affect water quality by increasing the volume of run-off and pollutant loads. One solution to decrease run-off is constructing new surfaces with pervious pavers, that allow rainwater to pass through the surface to groundwater aquifers and decrease the quantity of urban run-off. Additionally, proper use and storage of household chemicals are critical to decrease the frequency of spills that pollute local waterways.

== Recent large-scale pollution incidents ==
=== Deepwater Horizon oil spill ===
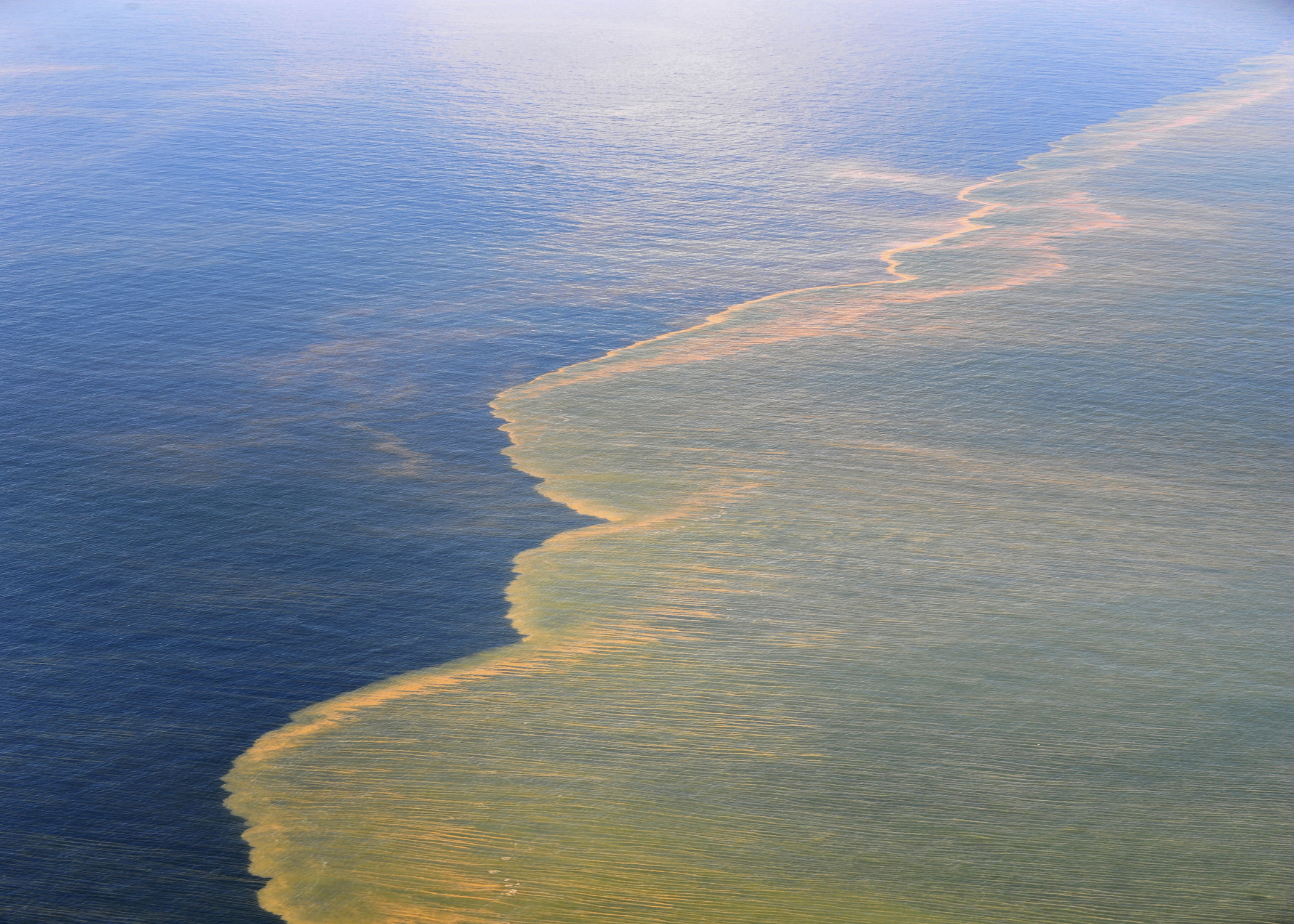
Oil from the Deepwater Horizon oil spill approaches the coast of Mobile, Alabama, 6 May 2010.

The Deepwater Horizon oil spill is considered to be the largest marine oil spill in the history of the petroleum industry. The incident began on April 20, 2010, when a semi-submersible BP oil rig exploded in the Gulf of Mexico about 41 miles off of the coast of Louisiana. The explosion led to discharges between 1,000 and 60,000 barrels of oil per day. It took responders 87 days to stop the spill, at which point the rig had leaked an estimated 3.19 million barrels of oil into the Gulf. Over 1,000 miles of shoreline on the Gulf of Mexico, from Texas to Florida, were impacted by the Deepwater Horizon spill.

==== Human health impacts ====
Of the crew members present during the Deepwater Horizon Oil Spill, 11 died and 17 were seriously injured. In addition, the frequency of hurricanes in the Gulf makes the effects of long-term exposure on humans more applicable, as these storms are capable of carrying crude oil over miles of ocean towards the shore. According to a research article from LSU, "damages to those living in the presence of crude oil the past 10 years are likely permanent, as chronic exposure leads to increased cancer risks, cardiovascular issues, and respiratory problems." Oil exposure and its respiratory effects were also analyzed in a study on the Coast guard personnel deployed to help clean up the spill. The article has 54.6% of responders stating they were exposed to crude oil, and 22.0% stating they were exposed to oil dispersants. Of the nearly 5,000 personnel who completed the survey, 19.4% experienced coughing, 5.5% experienced shortness of breath, and 3.6% experienced wheezing. The study also found that exposure to both oil and oil dispersants presented associations that were much stronger than oil alone for the different respiratory symptoms.

==== Environmental impacts ====
The northeast Gulf of Mexico shoreline contains about 60 percent of the coastal and freshwater marshes in the United States. A marsh environment tends to have standing water, making it among the most sensitive habitats to oil spills. Without the natural cleaning mechanism that flowing water provides, oil is able to coat marsh vegetation for longer periods of time, ruining nurseries that then impact a host of interconnected species. The Gulf of Mexico is also home to 22 species of marine mammals. Of these, up to 20 percent of all Kemp's ridley sea turtles present during the spill ended up dying, and the Louisiana Bottlenose dolphin ended up facing a 50 percent decline in population. However, because the BP oil spill occurred miles from any land, it wasn't as damaging to ecosystems along the shore as other oil spills. However, habitats along the shore were still exposed through balls of tar that would clump together and wash up on beaches, impacting local wildlife. Also, the consequences that drifting plumes of oil had on the deep-sea ecosystem is relatively unknown.

==== Economic impacts ====
In December 2010, the U.S. filed a complaint in District court against BP and several other defendants associated with the spill. The complaint resulted in a record-setting settlement, enforcing a $5.5 billion Clean Water Act penalty on BP Exploration & Production and up to $8.8 billion in natural resource damages. However, by 2015, BP had successfully recuperated most of the $40 billion lost in market value after the spill. This recovery was attributed to the company's inclination to continue exploring new oil resources despite the accident. Between 2011 and 2013, BP's Gulf of Mexico oil rigs doubled, and they began investing $1 billion towards opportunities in Alaska in 2015. On the other hand, a 2015 article from NPR exhibited how fishing cities along the Gulf Coast are still feeling harmful effects of the oil spill. In an interview with an oysterman from Alabama, he states, "business is still struggling...because of the lack of oyster production...I place the blame for that on the oil spill." The fisherman goes on to describe how the oyster reefs off of Louisiana have not been producing like they should since the spill.

=== Other notable incidents ===
==== Woburn, Massachusetts source water pollution ====
Water pollution in the city of Woburn, Massachusetts gained public recognition in the 1984 lawsuit filed by the families of children in Woburn who had died from leukemia in unusually high numbers. The families attributed the leukemia to the town's polluted drinking water which had been contaminated over 150 years of industry, most notably the toxic compounds used by leather factories in the area. These compounds were trichloroethylene and perchloroethylene that were introduced by leather factories and food processing plants with the areas. It has been displayed that trichloroethylene is responsible for many different types of cancers and can increase the risk of leukemia.

==== Martin County coal slurry spill ====
The Martin County coal slurry spill occurred on October 11, 2000, when a coal slurry broke into an abandoned mine and sent an estimated 306 million gallons of slurry into the Tug Fork River. The spill polluted 200–300 miles of the Big Sandy River and a water supply for over 27,000 residents.

==== Kingston Fossil Plant coal ash spill ====
On December 22, 2008, a dike ruptured on the Kingston Fossil Plant in Roane County, Tennessee and released 1.1 billion gallons of coal fly ash slurry into the Emory River. It was the largest fly ash release and worst coal ash-related disaster in U.S. history. Almost 30 workers died from this event and more than 100 were sick around 10 years after this incident. Many other incidents of coal ash have occurred and caused major effects towards rivers, lakes and the ecosystem around them.

==== 2015 Gold King Mine spill ====
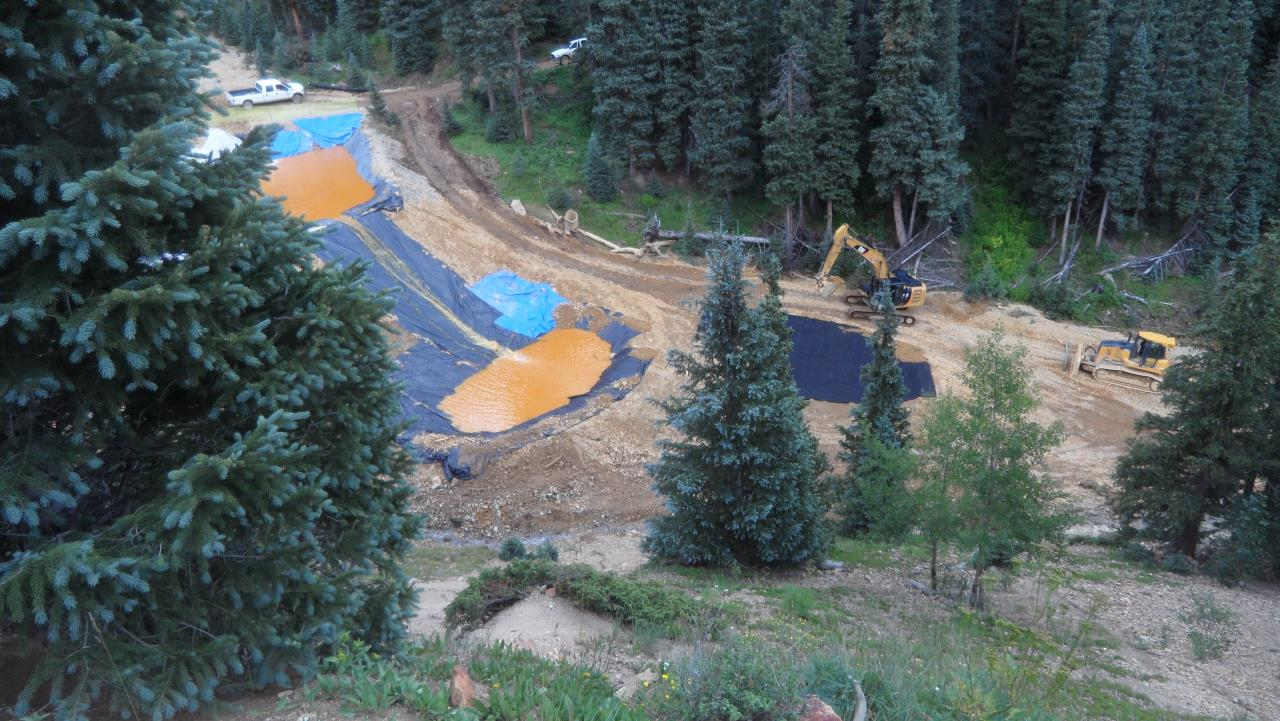
Emergency tailing ponds constructed in response to the 2015 Gold King Mine Spill, pictured on August 7

On August 5, 2015, workers on the Gold King Mine in Silverton, Colorado released 3 million gallons of toxic wastewater when attempting to add a tap to the tailing pond for the mine. The wastewater carried unsafe levels of heavy metals, with some parts of the river testing for hundreds of times over their limits.

==== Washington DC Potomac sewage spill ====
On January 19, 2026, a major sewer pipe collapsed, causing more than 300 million gallons of raw sewage and wastewater to flow into the Potomac River. DC Water installed a bypass system that diverted sewage upstream of the collapse into a quarter-mile dry portion of the Chesapeake and Ohio Canal and carried the wastewater 2,700 feet (820 m) before the water entered a non-damaged part of the pipe downstream. The bypass was activated on January 24 and captured the majority of the wastewater. The bypass was later enhanced with additional pumps, bringing water into the canal to add capacity and redundancy. On March 14, 2026 the emergency repair efforts were completed, and full flow returned to the interceptor pipe. DC Water began new long-term work to rehabilitate and strengthen the pipe.

== Regulations ==
=== Historical ===
During the late 19th century, there was little federal government attention paid to what were considered to be local environmental and health problems. A few states, including Massachusetts, New Jersey, Connecticut and Rhode Island, investigated industrial pollution problems on certain rivers within their respective boundaries but did not issue orders or regulations for the identified industries. The only federal legislation to address water pollution during this era was the Rivers and Harbors Act of 1899. In the 1899 law, Congress prohibited the dumping of "refuse"—debris that interfered with navigation—but other forms of pollution (e.g. sewage, food waste, chemical waste, oil spills) were not addressed. In 1924, to address oil spills in harbors, Congress passed the Oil Pollution Act. The law provided for penalties in the event of oil spills, but they were applicable only to vessels in coastal waters.

In the early 20th century the United States Public Health Service (PHS) began to investigate incidents of waterborne disease and drinking water contamination. In 1914 the agency published a set of drinking water standards that were applicable only to interstate common carriers such as railroads. PHS did not have the authority to issue broad pollution control regulations, but it published recommended standards for municipal water systems (which later influenced the adoption and implementation of the Safe Drinking Water Act in the 1970s). In 1922 the American Water Works Association issued a report identifying a range of industries that were pollution sources, including mining, food processing, chemical and dye works, oil wells and refineries, metal working, textiles, leather tanning, and pulp and paper mills. However these industrial sources were not extensively studied at that time, and the principal focus of most public health professionals was on biological contamination of water from untreated sewage.

In the 1920s there was agreement among water scientists that pollution from acid mine drainage and coke manufacturing (which generates phenols) was the major industrial waste problem. In 1924 a voluntary agreement was formulated between the US Surgeon General, several state agencies and manufacturers in the Ohio River valley to control phenol discharges from coke facilities. Regarding acid mine drainage, however, a PHS report stated that acid from mining had a positive germicidal effect and did not recommend pollution controls. PHS also conducted studies and described pollution problems in several major river systems and the Great Lakes. The PHS studies supported the development of the Streeter–Phelps equation, a water quality modelling tool that is used to predict dissolved oxygen levels in water bodies in response to pollutant loads.

Beginning in 1917, some states established water commissions or boards to monitor some aspects of water quality and coordinate their findings with existing state health agencies. These commissions conducted various pollution studies but did not issue regulations, instead relying on voluntary cooperation with industry.

In 1948 Congress passed the Federal Water Pollution Control Act which created a comprehensive set of water quality programs that also provided some financing for state and local governments. Enforcement was limited to interstate waters. PHS provided financial and technical assistance.

=== Current regulations ===
The Clean Water Act is the primary federal law in the United States governing water pollution in surface waters. The 1972 CWA amendments established a broad regulatory framework for improving water quality. The law defines procedures for pollution control and developing criteria and standards for pollutants in surface water. The law authorizes the Environmental Protection Agency to regulate surface water pollution in the United States, in partnership with state agencies. Prior to 1972 it was legal to discharge wastewater to surface waters without testing for or removing water pollutants. The CWA was amended in 1981 and 1987 to adjust the federal proportion of construction grant funding for local governments, regulate municipal storm sewer discharges and to later establish the Clean Water State Revolving Fund. The fund provides low-interest loans to improve municipal sewage treatment systems and finance other water quality improvements.

Under the CWA, the National Pollution Discharge Elimination System (NPDES) regulates permits for discharges into water bodies. The EPA regulations require each facility to apply for a specific permit for its wastewater discharges, and consequently require that each facility treat its wastewater. In addition to effluent limitations, the permits include monitoring and reporting requirements, which are used by EPA and states to enforce the limitations. However, over fifty percent of the rivers in the United States still violate the pollution standards published by the states. Additional requirements are implemented on a state-by-state basis, allowing for more stringent regulation for protected bodies of water. Additional regulation may be enacted to limit pollution that comes from nonpoint sources, such as agriculture. In many watersheds, nonpoint sources are the principal cause of noncompliance with water quality standards. EPA and states may employ a CWA regulatory mechanism called total maximum daily load (TMDL) to establish stringent pollution controls and may apply the requirements to both point sources and nonpoint sources. In 2010 EPA and several states developed extensive watershed-scale requirements in a large TMDL document for the Chesapeake Bay. State agencies are continuing to develop TMDL requirements for many water bodies across the US.

Some economists questioned whether the 1972 law was delivering the promised results of cleaner rivers and lakes, and whether benefits exceeded the costs to society. The United States government has spent over one trillion dollars trying to combat water pollution. In the CWA Congress had declared that the nation's waters were to be free of pollutants by 1983, only eleven years after enactment. In general, water quality has improved nationwide since 1972, but not all pollution has been eliminated. Between 1972 and 2001 there was a 12 percent increase in the number of waterways that are safe for fishing. Data supporting this finding is limited; only 19 percent of the United States’ waterways had been tested for contamination.

Groundwater protection provisions are included in the Safe Drinking Water Act, Resource Conservation and Recovery Act, and the Superfund act.

== See also ==
Summary information

- Drinking water supply and sanitation in the United States

Clean Water Act programs

- Clean Water State Revolving Fund (financial assistance program)
- Effluent guidelines (wastewater regulations)
- New Source Performance Standard (wastewater regulations)
- Total maximum daily load (wastewater regulations)
- WaterSense (EPA conservation program)

Specific topics

- Anderson v. Cryovac – groundwater contamination in Woburn, Massachusetts
- Effects of hydraulic fracturing on water quality in the United States
- Groundwater contamination from animal agriculture
- Pollution of the Chesapeake Bay
- Pollution in the Great Lakes
- Pollution of the Hudson River

General

- Environmental issues in the United States
