= Groundwater contamination from animal agriculture =

Groundwater pollution, also referred to as groundwater contamination, is not as easily classified as surface water pollution. Groundwater aquifers are susceptible to contamination from sources that may not directly affect surface water bodies.

Analysis of groundwater contamination may focus on soil characteristics and site geology, hydrogeology, hydrology, and the nature of the contaminants. Causes of groundwater pollution include: naturally occurring (geogenic), on-site sanitation systems, sewage, fertilizers and pesticide, commercial and industrial leaks, hydraulic fracturing, and landfill leachate. Groundwater contamination in California impacts many regions, such as the Central Valley.

One of the sources of groundwater contamination can be linked to animal agriculture and Animal feed operations (AFO). These facilities tend to have a higher concentration of animal manure, which when stored improperly can cause problems by leaking into local groundwater and aquifers, causing groundwater contamination. Under the Clean Water Act, AFOs are considered a point source of pollution and are held to specific standards by the United States' Environmental Protection Agency (EPA).

== Basic information ==
According to the EPA in a 2007 survey, 10% of California's groundwater has a Nitrogen level greater than 5 mg/L. This equates to around 7% of the population that is drinking contaminated groundwater. Five mg/L is half of the EPA limit of allowed nitrogen in water. There are two primary sources of pollution for nitrogen: agriculture and septic systems. Agriculture can contribute from heavy use of fertilizer as well as animal agriculture waste. Over 68 published and peer-reviewed studies have been conducted since 2002, out of these studies 15 found direct links to groundwater pollution from animals' waste at CAFOs. Twelve of the studies made indirect links to water pollution and human health while seven found no link at all

== California ground water ==
Due to factory farming practices and the use of nitrogen-rich fertilizers and animals waste in 1994 over 800 wells were closed in southern California, 130 of those well in the San Joaquin Valley. A study conducted in 1996 by the University of California, in which they monitored and surveyed 5 dairies in a high- risk groundwater area, higher levels of nitrates and salts were present under main milking areas, wastewater retention ponds and other land use areas. According to the Central Valley Dairy Representative Monitoring Program, some practices that are now implemented may not be represented in this data as some provisions of the 2007 General Order was only fully enforced and complete in 2012, when monitoring began. Please See Central Valley groundwater pollution

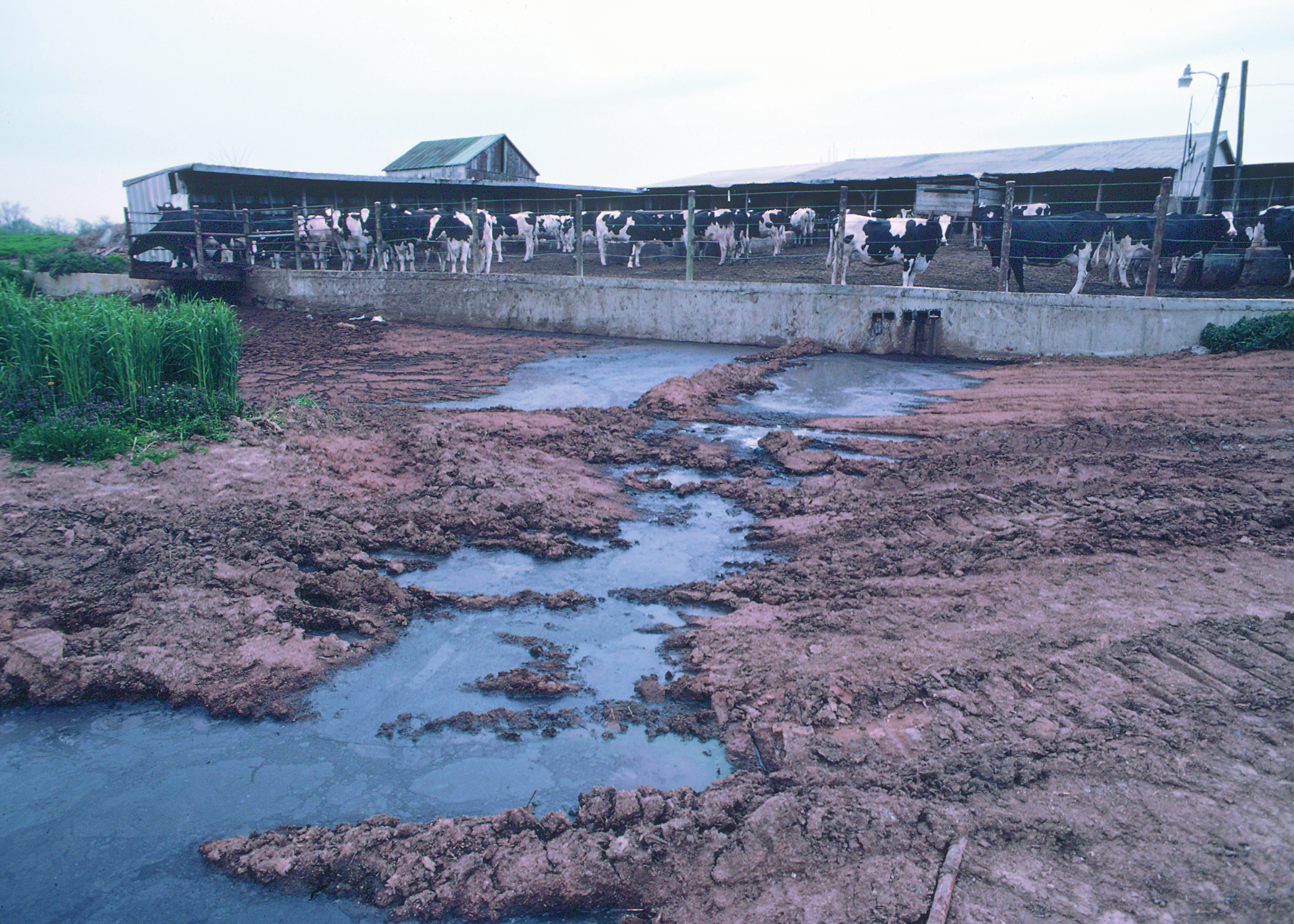
NRCSMD83002 - Maryland (4523)(NRCS Photo Gallery)

== Point source pollution ==
In the United States, there are roughly 450,000 concentrated animal feed operations (CAFO) where cows are held for at least 45 days over a 1-year period, in which a single cow can defecate up to 120 lb of manure a day, which is the equivalent of 20-40 people. Under the Clean Water Act Section 502(14) a CAFO is considered a point source of pollution.

== Regulation under the EPA ==
With the federal law on the side of the EPA, EPA has the authority to specifically regulate CAFO's as a polluter. According to the Clean Water Act, CAFO's are considered like other polluting industry in which the business must acquire a permit to pollute and they must have several controls in place. CAFO's are defined under the EPA as three distinct sizes that are based on the number of animals housed are as follows: "A Large CAFO confines at least the number of animals described in the table below. A Medium CAFO falls within the size range in the table below and either: • has a manmade ditch or pipe that carries manure or wastewater to surface water; or • the animals come into contact with surface water that passes through the area where they're confined. If an operation is found to be a significant contributor of pollutants, the permitting authority may designate a medium-sized facility as a CAFO. A Small CAFO confines fewer than the number of animals listed in the table and has been designated as a CAFO by the permitting authority as a significant contributor of pollutants. "

Animal Sector	Large CAFO	Medium CAFO	Small CAFO
Cattle or Cow	1000+	300-999	less than 300
Mature Dairy Cattle	700+	200-699	Less than 200
Veal claves	1000+	300-999	Less than 300
Swine (over 55 lb)	2500+	750-2499	Less than 750
Swine (less than 55 lb)	10000+	3000-9999	Less than 3000
Horses	500+	150-499	Less than 150
Sheep/Lamb	10000+	3000-9999	Less than 3000
Turkeys	55000+	16500-54999	Less than 16500
Laying Hens or Broilers	30000+	9000-29999	Less than 9000
Chickens other than laying Hens	125000+	37500-124999	Less than 9000
Ducks	30000+	10000-29999	Less than 10000

== See also ==
- Water pollution in the United States
