= Environmental impact of fracking in the United States =

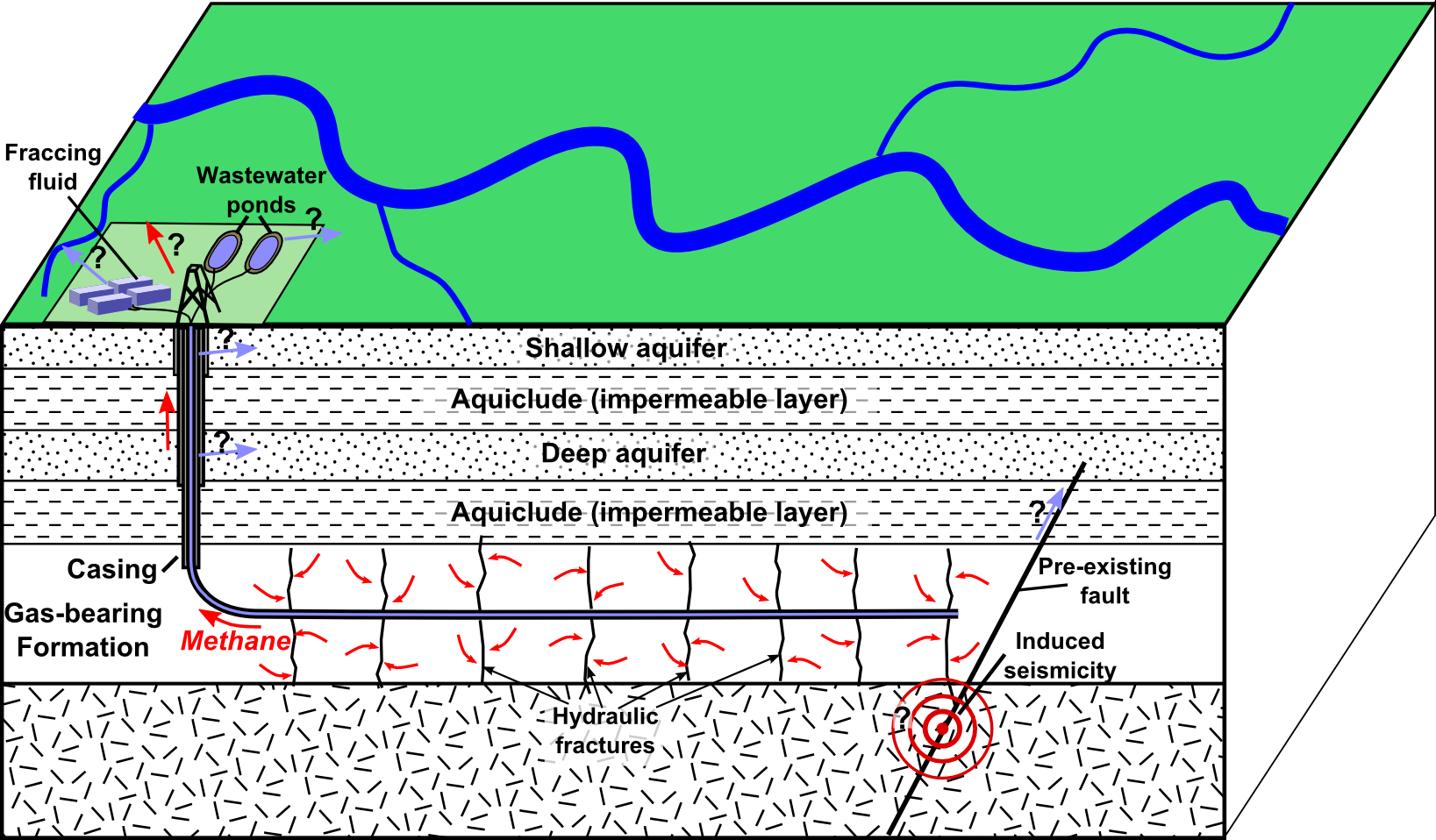
Schematic depiction of fracking for shale gas, showing potential environmental effects

Environmental impact of fracking in the United States has been an issue of public concern, and includes the contamination of ground and surface water, methane emissions, air pollution, migration of gases and fracking chemicals and radionuclides to the surface, the potential mishandling of solid waste, drill cuttings, increased seismicity and associated effects on human and ecosystem health. Research has determined that human health is affected. A number of instances with groundwater contamination have been documented due to well casing failures and illegal disposal practices, including confirmation of chemical, physical, and psychosocial hazards such as pregnancy and birth outcomes, migraine headaches, chronic rhinosinusitis, severe fatigue, asthma exacerbations, and psychological stress. While opponents of water safety regulation claim fracking has never caused any drinking water contamination, adherence to regulation and safety procedures is required to avoid further negative impacts.

As early as 1987, researchers at the United States Environmental Protection Agency (EPA) expressed concern that fracking might contaminate groundwater. With the growth of fracking in the United States in the following years, concern grew. "Public exposure to the many chemicals involved in energy development is expected to increase over the next few years, with uncertain consequences" wrote science writer Valerie Brown in 2007. It wasn't until 2010 that Congress asked the EPA to conduct a full study of the environmental impact of fracking. The study is ongoing, but the EPA released a progress report in December 2012 and released a final draft assessment report for peer review and comment in June 2015.

== Air quality and methane emissions ==
Methane emissions from wells raise global warming concerns. There is a 2,500 square-mile methane plume hovering over the Four Corners area of the western US. The magnitude of the plume was such that NASA researcher Christian Frankenberg reported to the press that, "We couldn't be sure that the signal was real." According to NASA: "The study's lead author, Eric Kort of the University of Michigan, Ann Arbor, noted the study period predates the widespread use of fracking near the hot spot. This indicates the methane emissions should not be attributed to fracking but instead to leaks in natural gas production and processing equipment in New Mexico's San Juan Basin, which is the most active coalbed methane production area in the country."

Other concerns are related to emissions from the fracking chemicals and equipment such as volatile organic compound (VOC) and ozone. In 2008, ozone concentrations in ambient air near drilling sites in Sublette County, Wyoming were frequently above the National Ambient Air Quality Standards (NAAQS) of 75 ppb and have been recorded as high as 125 ppb. In DISH, Texas, elevated levels of disulfides, benzene, xylenes and naphthalene have been detected in the air, emitted from compressor stations. In Garfield County, Colorado, an area with a high concentration of drilling rigs, VOC emissions increased 30% between 2004 and 2006.

Researchers from the University of Michigan analyzed the emissions produced from the fracking equipment at the Marcellus Shale and Eagle Ford Shale plays, and concluded that hydraulic pumps accounted for about 83% of the total emissions in the fracking fleet. NOx emission ranged between 3,600 and 5,600 lb/job, HC 232–289 lb/job, CO 859–1416 lb/job, and PM 184–310 lb/job. If the fuel efficiencies of the fracking pumps are improved, the emissions can be reduced.

On April 17, 2012, the EPA issued cost-effective regulations, required by the Clean Air Act, which include the first federal air standards for natural gas wells that are hydraulically fractured. The final rules are expected to yield a nearly 95% reduction in VOC emissions from more than 11,000 new hydraulically fractured gas wells each year. This reduction would be accomplished primarily through capturing natural gas that escapes into the air, and making it available for sale. The rules would also reduce air toxins, which are known or suspected of causing cancer and other serious health effects, and emissions of methane, a potent greenhouse gas.

A study published in the Proceedings of the National Academy of Sciences in April 2014 "identified a significant regional flux of methane over a large area of shale gas wells in southwestern Pennsylvania in the Marcellus formation and further identified several pads with high methane emissions. These shale gas pads were identified as in the drilling process, a preproduction stage not previously associated with high methane emissions." The study found that "Large emissions averaging 34 g CH4/s per well were observed from seven well pads determined to be in the drilling phase, 2 to 3 orders of magnitude greater than US Environmental Protection Agency estimates for this operational phase. The emissions from these well pads, representing ~1% of the total number of wells, account for 4–30% of the observed regional flux. More work is needed to determine all of the sources of methane emissions from natural gas production, to ascertain why these emissions occur and to evaluate their climate and atmospheric chemistry impacts."

A two-day airborne survey of fracking sites in southwest Pennsylvania revealed drilling operations releasing plumes of methane 100 to 1,000 times the rate the EPA expects from that stage of drilling.

In 2019, Robert W. Howarth concluded that rising shale-gas production in North America has contributed significantly to the recent increase in global atmospheric methane. The ideas and perspectives piece from Howarth is controversial with a critical comment from Lewan (2020) and at odds with other papers including a 2019 review paper on atmospheric methane (Turner et al., PNAS 2019) and two earlier papers using stable isotopes (Schaefer et al., Science 2016; Schwietzke et al., Nature 2016).

== Water issues ==
=== 2015 EPA Report on Spills ===
In May 2015, the EPA released a report reviewing the spill data from various state and industry sources for data about spills related to hydraulic fracturing. Of the total reports reviewed in the study 1% (457) were determined to be related to hydraulic fracturing, while 66% were unrelated and 33% had insufficient data reported to determine if the spill was associated to hydraulic fracturing. In 324 incidents the spilled fluids were reported to reach categorized environmental receptors: Surface Water 67%, Soil 64%, and Ground Water 48%.

Other key spill figures from the report:

- Median spill volume 730 gallons
- The highest number and volume of spills from flowback/produced water
- Total fluid spilled 2,300,000 gallons
- Fluid recovered 480,000 gallons
- Fluid unrecovered 1,600,000 gallons
- Fluid unknown (recovery not reported) 250,000 gallons
- The largest numbers of spills were caused by human error 150 (33%); while the largest volume of spilled fluids was from failure of containers 1,500,000 gal (64%).

This report was cited in the full hydraulic fracturing water report now open for peer review though not directly addressed in the contents of the EPA spill data report. Several times, associations between hydraulic fracturing, causes of spills, and response to spills were unknown or indeterminate because of missing or unreported data. This highlights the need for more complete reporting and standardization of reporting for improved tracking to better guide implementation of environmental safety practices particularly where the impact is likely to impact key health determinants like water quality.

=== Water usage ===
Hydraulic fracturing uses between 1.2 and 3.5 million US gallons (4,500 and 13,200 m^{3}) of water per well, with large projects using up to 5 million US gallons (19,000 m^{3}). Additional water is used when wells are refractured. An average well requires 3 to 8 million US gallons (11,000 to 30,000 m^{3}) of water over its lifetime. Back in 2008 and 2009 at the beginning of the shale boom in Pennsylvania, hydraulic fracturing accounted for 650 million US gallons per year (2,500,000 m^{3}/a) (less than 0.8%) of annual water use in the area overlying the Marcellus Shale. The annual number of well permits, however, increased by a factor of five and the number of well starts increased by a factor of over 17 from 2008 to 2011.

According to Environment America, a federation of state-based, citizen-funded environmental advocacy organizations, there are concerns for farmers competing with oil and gas for water. A report by Ceres questions whether the growth of hydraulic fracturing is sustainable in Texas and Colorado as 92% of Colorado wells were in extremely high water stress regions (that means regions where more than 80% of the available water is already allocated for agricultural, industrial and municipal water use) and 51% percent of the Texas wells were in high or extremely high water stress regions. In Barnhart, Texas the aquifer supplying the local community ran dry because of intensive water utilization for hydraulic fracturing. In 2013, the Railroad Commission of Texas adopted new hydraulic fracturing water recycling rules intended to encourage Texas hydraulic fracturing operators to conserve water used in the hydraulic fracturing process.

Consequences for agriculture have already been observed in North America. In some regions of the US that are vulnerable to droughts, farmers are now competing with fracking industrials for the use of water resources. In the Barnett Shale region, in Texas and New Mexico, drinking water wells have dried up due to fracking's withdrawal of water, and water has been taken from an aquifer used for residential and agricultural use. Farmers have seen their wells go dry in Texas and New Mexico as a result of fracking's pressure on water resources, for instance in Carlsbad, New Mexico. Agricultural communities have already seen water prices rising because of that problem. In the North Water Conservation District in Colorado was organized an auction to allocate water and the prices rose from $22/acre-foot in 2010 to $28 in the beginning of 2012.

=== Injected fluid ===
Hydraulic fracturing fluids include proppants, various chemicals, and sometimes radionuclide tracers. While many are common and generally harmless, some additives used in the United States are known carcinogens. Out of 2,500 hydraulic fracturing products, more than 650 contained known or possible human carcinogens regulated under the Safe Drinking Water Act or listed as hazardous air pollutants". Between 2005 and 2009, 279 products had at least one component listed as "proprietary" or "trade secret" on their Occupational Safety and Health Administration (OSHA) required safety data sheet (SDS). In many instances, companies who bought products off the shelf did not know the ingredients. Without knowing the identity of the proprietary components, regulators cannot test for their presence. This prevents government regulators from establishing baseline levels of the substances prior to hydraulic fracturing and documenting changes in these levels, thereby making it more difficult to prove that hydraulic fracturing is contaminating the environment with these substances.

The Ground Water Protection Council launched FracFocus.org, an online voluntary disclosure database for hydraulic fracturing fluids funded by oil and gas trade groups and the United States Department of Energy (DOE). The site has been met with some scepticism relating to proprietary information that is not included. Some states have mandated fluid disclosure and incorporated FracFocus as the tool for disclosure.

=== Groundwater contamination ===
In-depth research to determine a relation between fracking and groundwater contamination is sparse, but evidence suggests that fracking has contributed to groundwater contamination due to the chemicals used in the procedure of shale drilling; however, since thousands of feet of dirt and rock separate natural gas deposits and groundwater supplies, and other contaminating agents could also contribute, it is difficult to determine an absolute relation between fracking and groundwater contamination.

In 2009, state regulators from across the country stated that they had seen no evidence of hydraulic fracturing contaminating water in their respective jurisdictions. In May 2011 the EPA Administrator Lisa P. Jackson testified in a Senate Hearing Committee stating that the EPA had never made a definitive determination of contamination where the hydraulic fracturing process itself has contaminated water. However, by 2013, Dr. Robin Ikeda, Deputy Director of Noncommunicable Diseases, Injury and Environmental Health at the CDC testified to Congress that EPA had documented contamination at several sites.

==== Incidents of contamination ====
- As early as 1987, an EPA report was published that indicated fracture fluid invasion into James Parson's water well in Jackson County, West Virginia. The well, drilled by Kaiser Exploration and Mining Company, was found to have induced fractures that created a pathway to allow fracture fluid to contaminate the groundwater from which Mr. Parson's well was producing. Directed by Congress, the EPA announced in March 2010 that it would examine claims of water pollution related to hydraulic fracturing. According to former EPA employees, the EPA at that time planned to call for a moratorium on fracking while the study was being conducted, but the government removed that recommendation from the letter sent to officials.
- In 2006, over 7 million cubic feet (200,000 m^{3}) of methane were released from a blown gas well in Clark, Wyoming and nearby groundwater was found to be contaminated with hydrocarbon compounds and benzene particularly.
- An investigation was initiated after a Pennsylvania water well exploded on New Year's Day in 2009. The state investigation revealed that Cabot Oil & Gas Company "had allowed combustible gas to escape into the region's groundwater supplies." Arsenic, barium, DEHP, glycol compounds, manganese, phenol, methane, and sodium were found in unacceptable levels in the wells. In April 2010, the state of Pennsylvania banned Cabot Oil & Gas Corp. from further drilling in the entire state until it plugs wells believed to be the source of contamination of the drinking water of 14 homes in Dimock Township, Pennsylvania. Cabot Oil & Gas was also required to financially compensate residents and provide alternative sources of water until mitigation systems were installed in affected wells. The company denies, however, that any "of the issues in Dimock have anything to do with hydraulic fracturing". In May 2012 the EPA reported that their most recent "set of sampling did not show levels of contaminants that would give the EPA reason to take further action." Methane was found only in one well. Cabot has held that the methane was preexisting, but state regulators have cited chemical fingerprinting as proof that it was from Cabot's hydraulic fracturing activities. The EPA plans to re-sample four wells where previous data by the company and the state showed levels of contaminants.
- Complaints about water quality from residents near a gas field in Pavillion, Wyoming prompted an EPA groundwater investigation. An EPA draft report dated December 8, 2011 found that contaminants in surface water near pits indicated were a source of contamination, and by the time the report was issued the company had already started to remediate the pits. The report also suggested that the groundwater contained "compounds likely associated with gas production practices, including hydraulic fracturing... Alternative explanations were carefully considered for individual sets of data. However, when considered together with other lines of evidence, the data indicates likely impact to ground water that can be explained by hydraulic fracturing." The Agency for Toxic Substances and Disease Registry recommended that owners of tainted wells use alternate sources of water for drinking and cooking, and ventilation when showering. Encana is funding the alternate water supplies. State and industry figures rejected the EPA's findings. In 2012 the U.S. Geological Survey, tasked with further sampling of the EPA wells, tested one of two EPA monitoring wells near Pavillion (the other well the USGS considered unsuitable for collecting water samples) and found evidence of methane, ethane, diesel compounds and phenol, In June 2013, the EPA announced that it was closing its investigation at Pavilion, and would not finish or seek peer review of its preliminary 2011 study. Further investigation will be done by the state of Wyoming.
- Further, it has been reported that the actual labs being used to test the water samples for contamination are not geared to test for the chemicals used in hydraulic fracturing. The labs were formerly used for the Superfund program and for cleaning up Superfund sites they work well but they are not geared for testing for fracking chemicals so tests from these labs are suspect.

[67]

=== Flowback and produced water ===
Flowback is the portion of the injected fracturing fluid that flows back to the surface, along with oil, gas, and brine, during well commissioning, a process which typically takes a week, though durations vary. An estimated 90% of flowback in the United States is disposed of into deep EPA-licensed Class II disposal wells, with the remaining less than 10% reused, evaporated, used for irrigation, or discharged to surface streams under an NPDES permit. Of nine oil and gas-producing states studied in 2012, underground injection disposal was by far the predominant method in all but Pennsylvania where were only six active waste disposal wells. In California, Virginia, and Ohio there have been instances of illegal dumping of flowback, a precursor to possible contamination of local ground and surface water reservoirs. Discharging oil and gas produced water to surface streams without an NPDES permit is a federal crime. Discharges through water treatment works must comply with the federal Clean Water Act and the terms of their NPDES permits, but the EPA noted that most water treatment works are not set up to treat flowback.

In Pennsylvania, oil and gas produced water had for many years been accepted by licensed water treatment works for treatment and discharge, but the volume expanded greatly with the proliferation of Marcellus Shale wells after 2000. In 2010 the Pennsylvania Department of Environmental Protection (DEP) limited surface water discharges from new treatment plants to 250 mg/L chloride; the chloride limitation was designed to also limit other contaminants such as radium. Existing water treatment plants were "grandfathered," and still allowed higher discharge concentrations, but oil and gas operators were prohibited to send wastewater to the grandfathered treatment plants.

One Duke University study reported that "Marcellus [Shale] wells produce significantly less wastewater per unit gas recovered (~35%) compared to conventional natural gas wells." In Colorado the volume of wastewater discharged to surface streams increased from 2008 to 2011.

=== Surface water contamination ===
Hydraulic fracturing can affect surface water quality either through accidental spills at the wellsite, or by discharge of the flowback through existing water treatment works. Directed by Congress, the EPA announced in March 2010 that it would examine claims of water pollution related to hydraulic fracturing. Christopher Portier, director of the CDC's National Center for Environmental Health and the Agency for Toxic Substances and Disease Registry, argued that, in addition to the EPA's plans to investigate the impact of hydraulic fracturing on drinking water, additional studies should be carried out to determine whether wastewater from the wells can harm people or animals and vegetables they eat. A group of US doctors called for a moratorium on hydraulic fracturing in populated areas until such studies had been done.

However, others point out exclusions and exemptions for hydraulic fracturing under United States federal law. Exemptions were made in the Clean Water Act, as part of the Energy Policy Act of 2005, also known as the "Halliburton Loophole." These exemptions included stormwater runoff from gas and oil construction activities which includes "oil and gas exploration, production, process, or treatment operations and transmission facilities" as part of the definition of construction activities. Amendments to the Safe Drinking Water Act involved the definition of underground injection. Underground injection related to hydraulic fracturing was exempted from the Clean Water Act, except if it uses diesel fuel.

The growing of oil and natural gas drilling employing hydraulic fracturing technology is steady around different regions of the United States, but the maintenance of wastewater gathered after the drilling process containing hydraulic fracturing fluids is lagging behind. In Pennsylvania, the DEP reported that the resources to properly regulate wastewater-handling facilities were unavailable, inspecting facilities every 20 years rather than every 2 years as called for by regulation.

The quantity of wastewater and the unpreparedness of sewage plants to treat wastewater, is an issue in Pennsylvania. The Associated Press has reported that starting in 2011, the DEP strongly resisted providing the AP and other news organizations with information about complaints related to drilling. When waste brine is discharged to surface waters through conventional wastewater treatment plants, the bromide in the brine usually is not captured. Although not a health hazard by itself, in western Pennsylvania some downstream drinking water treatment plants using the surface water experienced increases in brominated trihalomethanes in 2009 and 2010. Trihalomethanes, undesirable byproducts of the chlorination process, form when the chlorine combines with dissolved organic matter in the source water, to form the trihalomethane chloroform. Bromine can substitute for some chlorine, forming brominated trihalomethanes. Because bromine has a higher atomic weight than chlorine, the partial conversion to brominated trihalomethanes increases the concentration by weight of total trihalomethanes.

=== Radioactivity ===
Radioactivity associated with hydraulically fractured wells comes from two sources: naturally occurring radioactive material and radioactive tracers introduced into the wells. Flowback from oil and gas wells is usually disposed of deep underground in Class II injection wells, but in Pennsylvania, much of the wastewater from hydraulic fracturing operations is processed by public sewage treatment plants. Many sewage plants say that they are incapable of removing the radioactive components of this waste, which is often released into major rivers. Industry officials, though, claim that these levels are diluted enough that public health is not compromised.

In 2011, the level of dissolved radium in hydraulic fracturing wastewater released upstream from drinking water intakes had been measured to be up to 18,035 pCi/L (667.3 Bq/L), and the gross alpha level measured to be up to 40,880 pCi/L (1,513 Bq/L). The New York Times reported that studies by the EPA and a confidential study by the drilling industry concluded that radioactivity in drilling waste cannot be fully diluted in rivers and other waterways. A recent Duke University study sampled water downstream from a Pennsylvania wastewater treatment facility from 2010 through Fall 2012 and found the creek sediment contained levels of radium 200 times background levels. The surface water had the same chemical signature as rocks in the Marcellus Shale formation. The facility denied processing Marcellus waste since 2011. In May 2013 the facility signed another agreement to not accept or discharge wastewater Marcellus Shale formations until it has installed technology to remove the radiation compounds, metals and salts. According to the Duke researches the 'waste treatment solids/sludge' have exceeded U.S. regulations for radium disposal to soil. The study by Duke University also found that radium has been "absorbed and accumulated on the sediments locally at the discharge".

The New York Times noted that in 2011 the Pennsylvania DEP only made a "request — not a regulation" of gas companies to stop sending their flowback and waste water to public water treatment facilities. However, the DEP gave oil and gas operators 30 days to voluntarily comply, and they all did. Former Pennsylvania DEP Secretary John Hanger, who served under Gov. Ed Rendell, affirmed that municipal drinking water throughout the state is safe. "Every single drop that is coming out of the tap in Pennsylvania today meets the safe drinking water standard," Hanger said, but added that the environmentalists were accurate in stating that Pennsylvania water treatment plants were not equipped to treat hydraulic fracturing water. Current Pennsylvania DEP Secretary Michael Krancer serving under Gov. Tom Corbett has said it is "total fiction" that untreated wastewater is being discharged into the state's waterways, though it has been observed that Corbett received over a million dollars in gas industry contributions, more than all his competitors combined, during his election campaign. Unannounced inspections are not made by regulators: the companies report their own spills, and create their own remediation plans. A recent review of the state-approved plans found them to appear to be in violation of the law. Treatment plants are still not equipped to remove radioactive material and are not required to test for it. Despite this, in 2009 the Ridgway Borough's public sewage treatment plant, in Elk County, PA, facility was sent wastewater containing radium and other types of radiation at 275–780 times the drinking-water standard. The water being released from the plant was not tested for radiation levels. Part of the problem is that growth in waste produced by the industry has outpaced regulators and state resources. "Safe drinking water standards" have not yet been set for many of the substances known to be in hydrofracturing fluids or their radioactivity levels, and their levels are not included in public drinking water quality reports.

Tests conducted in Pennsylvania in 2009 found "no evidence of elevated radiation levels" in waterways. At the time radiation concerns were not seen as a pressing issue. In 2011 The New York Times reported radium in wastewater from natural gas wells is released into Pennsylvania rivers, and compiled a map of these wells and their wastewater contamination levels, and stated that some EPA reports were never made public. The Times' reporting on the issue has come under some criticism. A 2012 study examining a number of hydraulic fracturing sites in Pennsylvania and Virginia by Pennsylvania State University, found that water that flows back from gas wells after hydraulic fracturing contains high levels of radium.

Before 2011, flowback in Pennsylvania was processed by public wastewater plants, which were not equipped to remove radioactive material and were not required to test for it. Industry officials, though, claim that these levels are diluted enough that public health is not compromised. In 2010 the DEP limited surface water discharges from new treatment plants to 250 mg/L chloride. This limitation was designed to also limit other contaminants such as radium. Existing water treatment plants were allowed higher discharge concentrations. In April 2011, the DEP asked unconventional gas operators to voluntarily stop sending wastewater to the grandfathered treatment plants. The PADEP reported that the operators had complied.

A 2013 Duke University study sampled water downstream from a Pennsylvania wastewater treatment facility from 2010 through 2012 and found that creek sediment contained levels of radium 200 times background levels. The surface water had the same chemical signature as rocks in the Marcellus Shale formation along with high levels of chloride. The facility denied processing Marcellus waste after 2011. In May 2013 the facility signed another agreement to not accept or discharge Marcellus wastewater until it installed technology to remove the radioactive materials, metals and salts.

A 2012 study by researchers from the National Renewable Energy Laboratory, University of Colorado, and Colorado State University reported a reduction in the percentage of flowback treated through surface water discharge in Pennsylvania from 2008 through 2011. By late 2012, bromine concentrations had declined to previous levels in the Monongahela River, but remained high in the Allegheny.

==== Naturally occurring radioactive materials ====
The New York Times has reported radiation in hydraulic fracturing wastewater released into rivers in Pennsylvania. It collected data from more than 200 natural gas wells in Pennsylvania and has posted a map entitled Toxic Contamination from Natural Gas Wells in Pennsylvania. The Times stated "never-reported studies" by the United States Environmental Protection Agency and a "confidential study by the drilling industry" concluded that radioactivity in drilling waste cannot be fully diluted in rivers and other waterways. Despite this, as of early 2011 federal and state regulators did not require sewage treatment plants that accept drilling waste (which is mostly water) to test for radioactivity. In Pennsylvania, where the drilling boom began in 2008, most drinking-water intake plants downstream from sewage treatment plants have not tested for radioactivity since before 2006.

The New York Times reporting has been criticized and one science writer has taken issue with one instance of the newspaper's presentation and explanation of its calculations regarding dilution, charging that a lack of context made the article's analysis uninformative.

According to a Times report in February 2011, wastewater at 116 of 179 deep gas wells in Pennsylvania "contained high levels of radiation," but its effect on public drinking water supplies is unknown because water suppliers are required to conduct tests of radiation "only sporadically". The New York Post stated that the DEP reported that all samples it took from seven rivers in November and December 2010 "showed levels at or below the normal naturally occurring background levels of radioactivity", and "below the federal drinking water standard for Radium 226 and 228." However, samples taken by the state from at least one river, (the Monongahela, a source of drinking water for parts of Pittsburgh), were taken upstream from the sewage treatment plants accepting drilling waste water.

==== Radioactive tracers ====
Radioactive tracer isotopes are sometimes injected with hydraulic fracturing fluid to determine the injection profile and location of created fractures. Sand containing gamma-emitting tracer isotopes is used to trace and measure fractures. A 1995 study found that radioactive tracers were used in over 15% of stimulated oil and gas wells. In the United States, injection of radionuclides are licensed and regulated by the Nuclear Regulatory Commission (NRC). According to the NRC, some of the most commonly used tracers include antimony-124, bromine-82, iodine-125, iodine-131, iridium-192, and scandium-46. A 2003 publication by the International Atomic Energy Agency confirms the frequent use of most of the tracers above, and says that manganese-56, sodium-24, technetium-99m, silver-110m, argon-41, and xenon-133 are also used extensively because they are easily identified and measured. According to a 2013 meeting of researchers who examined low (never exceeding drinking water standards) but persistent detections of iodine-131 in a stream used for Philadelphia drinking water: "Workshop participants concluded that the likely source of 131-I in Philadelphia's source waters is residual 131-I excreted from patients following medical treatments," but suggested that other potential sources also be studied, including hydraulic fracturing.

== Seismicity ==
Hydraulic fracturing routinely produces microseismic events much too small to be detected except by sensitive instruments. These microseismic events are often used to map the horizontal and vertical extent of the fracturing. However, a 2012 US Geological Survey study reported that a "remarkable" increase in the rate of M ≥ 3 earthquakes in the US midcontinent "is currently in progress", having started in 2001 and culminating in a 6-fold increase over 20th-century levels in 2011. The overall increase was tied to earthquake increases in a few specific areas: the Raton Basin of southern Colorado (site of coalbed methane activity), and gas-producing areas in central and southern Oklahoma, and central Arkansas. While analysis suggested that the increase is "almost certainly man-made", the United States Geological Survey (USGS) noted: "USGS's studies suggest that the actual hydraulic fracturing process is only very rarely the direct cause of felt earthquakes." The increased earthquakes were said to be most likely caused by increased injection of gas-well wastewater into disposal wells. The injection of waste water from oil and gas operations, including from hydraulic fracturing, into saltwater disposal wells may cause bigger low-magnitude tremors, being registered up to 3.3 (M_{w}).

=== Induced seismicity from hydraulic fracturing ===
Hydraulic fracturing routinely triggers microseismic events too small to be detected except with sensitive instruments. However, according to the US Geological Survey: "Reports of hydraulic fracturing causing earthquakes large enough to be felt at the surface are extremely rare, with only three occurrences reported as of late 2012, in Great Britain, Oklahoma, and Canada." Bill Ellsworth, a geoscientist with the U.S. Geological Survey, has said, however: "We don't see any connection between fracking and earthquakes of any concern to society." The National Research Council (part of the National Academy of Sciences) has also observed that hydraulic fracturing, when used in shale gas recovery, does not pose a serious risk of causing earthquakes that can be felt.

=== Induced seismicity from water disposal wells ===
Of greater concern are earthquakes associated with permitted Class II deep wastewater injection wells, many of which inject frac flowback and produced water from oil and gas wells.The USGS has reported earthquakes induced by disposal of produced water and hydraulic fracturing flowback into waste disposal wells in several locations.

In 2013, Researchers from Columbia University and the University of Oklahoma demonstrated that in the midwestern United States, some areas with increased human-induced seismicity are susceptible to additional earthquakes triggered by the seismic waves from remote earthquakes. They recommended increased seismic monitoring near fluid injection sites to determine which areas are vulnerable to remote triggering and when injection activity should be ceased.

Geophysicist Cliff Frohlich researched seismic activity on the Barnett Shale in Texas from 2009 to 2011. Frohlich set up temporary seismographs on a 70-kilometer grid covering the Barnett Shale in Texas. The seismographs sensed and located earthquakes 1.5 magnitude and larger in the area. The seismographs revealed a spatial association between earthquakes and Class II injection wells, most of which were established to dispose of flowback and produced water from Barnett Shale wells, near Dallas-Fort Worth and Cleburne, Texas. Some of the earthquakes were greater than magnitude 3.0, and were felt by people at the surface, and reported in the local news. Earthquakes were reported in areas where there had previously been no recorded earthquakes. The study found that the great majority of Class II injection wells are not associated with earthquakes. Injection-induced earthquakes were strongly associated with wells injecting more than 150,000 barrels of water per month, and particularly after those wells had been injecting for more than a year. The majority of induced earthquakes occurred in Johnson County, which seemed more prone to induced earthquakes than other parts of the Barnett play.

Earthquakes large enough to be felt by people have also been linked to some deep disposal wells that receive hydraulic fracturing flowback and produced water from hydraulically fractured wells. Flowback and brine from oil and gas wells are injected into EPA-regulated class II disposal wells. According to the EPA, approximately 144,000 such class II disposal wells in the US receive more than 2 billion US gallons (7.6 Gl) of wastewater each day. To date, the strongest earthquakes triggered by underground waste injection were three quakes close to Richter magnitude 5 recorded in 1967 near a Colorado disposal well which received non-oilfield waste.

According to the USGS only a small fraction of roughly 40,000 waste fluid disposal wells for oil and gas operations in the United States have induced earthquakes that are large enough to be of concern to the public. Although the magnitudes of these quakes has been small, the USGS says that there is no guarantee that larger quakes will not occur. In addition, the frequency of the quakes has been increasing. In 2009, there were 50 earthquakes greater than magnitude 3.0 in the area spanning Alabama and Montana, and there were 87 quakes in 2010. In 2011 there were 134 earthquakes in the same area, a sixfold increase over 20th-century levels. There are also concerns that quakes may damage underground gas, oil, and water lines and wells that were not designed to withstand earthquakes.

The 2011 Oklahoma earthquake, the second-largest earthquake in Oklahoma history at magnitude 5.7, has been linked by some researchers to decades-long injection of brine. A 2015 study concluded that recent earthquakes in central Oklahoma, which includes 5.7 magnitude quake, were triggered by injection of produced water from conventional oil reservoirs in the Hunton Group, and are unrelated to hydraulic fracturing.

Class II disposal wells receiving brine from Fayetteville Shale gas wells in Central Arkansas triggered hundreds of shallow earthquakes, the largest of which was magnitude 4.7, and caused damage. In April 2011, the Arkansas Oil and Gas Commission halted injection at two of the main disposal wells, and the earthquakes abated.

Several earthquakes in 2011, including a 4.0 magnitude tremor on New Year's Eve that hit Youngstown, Ohio, are likely linked to a disposal of hydraulic fracturing wastewater, according to seismologists at Columbia University. By order of the Ohio Department of Natural Resources, the well had stopped injecting on December 30, 2011. The following day, after the 4.0 quake, Ohio governor John Kasich ordered an indefinite halt to injection in three additional deep disposal wells in the vicinity. The Department of Natural Resources proposed a number of tightened rules to its Class II injection regulations. The Department noted that there were 177 operational Class II disposal wells in the state, and that the Youngstown well was the first to produce recorded earthquakes since Ohio's Underground Injection Control program began in 1983.

Since 2008, more than 50 earthquakes, up to a magnitude of 3.5, have occurred in the area of north Texas home to numerous Barnett Shale gas wells, an area that previously had no earthquakes. No injuries or serious damage from the earthquakes has been reported. A study of quakes near the Dallas-Fort Worth Airport 2008–2009, concluded that the quakes were triggered by disposal wells receiving brine from gas wells.

A two-year study 2009–2011 by University of Texas researchers concluded that a number of earthquakes from Richter magnitude 1.5 to 2.5 in the Barnett Shale area of north Texas were linked to oilfield waste disposal into Class II injection wells. No quakes were linked to hydraulic fracturing itself. Researchers noted that there are more than 50,000 Class II disposal wells in Texas receiving oilfield waste, yet only a few dozen are suspected of triggering earthquakes.

On May 31, 2014, an earthquake registering at a magnitude of 3.4 occurred in Greeley, Colorado. The earthquake occurred near two hydraulic fracturing wastewater injection wells that are reportedly close to capacity. One waste injection well is 8,700 feet deep and 20 years old, while the other is 10,700 feet and just two years old. A research team from the University of Colorado Boulder have placed seismographs in the area to monitor further activity.

== Abandoned wells ==
Drilling for oil and gas has been going on in Pennsylvania since 1859, and there are an estimated 300,000 to 500,000 wells drilled before the state kept track of the wells, or required them to be properly plugged. The Pennsylvania Department of Environmental Protection (DEP) has a program to locate and plug old wells. A 2014 study examined 19 abandoned wells, 14 of which had never been plugged, and only one of which was known to the state. Methane leakage rates were measured, and extrapolations over all the expected orphaned wells in the state indicated that the old wells made up a significant source of methane. A 2019 study explores the long-term (> 30 years) flow and transport of fracturing fluids into overburden layers and groundwater aquifers through a leaky abandoned well. It shows the spatial properties of the abandoned well as well as its distance from the hydraulic fracture are the most important factors influencing the vertical flow of fracturing fluid into groundwater aquifers. The study suggests that even for various field settings, only a limited amount of fracturing fluid can reach the aquifer in a long-term period.

== Health effects ==
There is worldwide concern over the possible adverse public health implications of hydraulic fracturing activity. Intensive research is underway to ascertain whether there are impacts on a number of health conditions.

Potential sources for ground and surface water exposure to toxins and toxicants (including endocrine-disrupting hormones, heavy metals, minerals, radioactive substances, and salts) include 1) the drilling and fracturing phase; 2) improper treatment of wastewater, including spills during transport; and 3) failure of cement wall casings.

Many of the above contaminants have been associated with poor health outcomes, especially reproductive and developmental. Heavy metal and benzene/toluene exposure during pregnancy has been associated with miscarriage and stillbirths. Benzene and toluene have been associated with menstrual cycle disorders. Cancer, blood disorders, nervous system impairment, and respiratory issues have also been cited as potential complications of hydraulic fracturing fluid exposure.

The 2014 EPA Executive summary describes evidence of drinking water contamination due to spills, inadequate casings, and other etiologies. Per this summary, frequency estimates range from one spill for every 100 wells in Colorado to between 0.4–12.2 spills for every 100 wells in Pennsylvania. Furthermore, "at least 3% of the wells (600 out of 23,000 wells) did not have cement across a portion of the casing installed through the protected ground water resource identified by well operators."

While the health effects of water contamination, as well as air pollution and other potential health hazards due to hydraulic fracturing, is not well understood, studies report concerning findings. A 2014 retrospective cohort study of 124,842 births between 1996–2009 in rural Colorado reported statistically significant odds of congenital heart disease, including neural tube defects, with resident exposure to hydraulic fracturing.

A 2015 study revealed lower birth weights and a higher incidence of small for gestational age comparing most to least exposed.

A 2013 review focusing on Marcellus shale gas hydraulic fracturing and the New York City water supply stated, "Although potential benefits of Marcellus natural gas exploitation are large for transition to a clean energy economy, at present the regulatory framework in New York State is inadequate to prevent potentially irreversible threats to the local environment and New York City water supply. Major investments in state and federal regulatory enforcement will be required to avoid these environmental consequences, and a ban on drilling within the NYC water supply watersheds is appropriate, even if more highly regulated Marcellus gas production is eventually permitted elsewhere in New York State."

Early in January 2012, Christopher Portier, director of the US CDC's National Center for Environmental Health and the Agency for Toxic Substances and Disease Registry, argued that, in addition to the EPA's plans to investigate the impact of fracking on drinking water, additional studies should be carried out to determine whether wastewater from the wells can harm people or animals and vegetables they eat.

As of May 2012, the United States Institute of Medicine and United States National Research Council were preparing to review the potential human and environmental risks of hydraulic fracturing.

In 2011 in Garfield County, Colorado, the U.S. Agency for Toxic Substances and Disease Registry collected air samples at 14 sites, including 8 oil and gas sites, 4 urban background sites, and 2 rural background sites. and detected carcinogens such as benzene, tetrachloroethene, and 1–4 dichlorobenzene at all the sites, both oil and gas sites, and background sites. Benzene was detected at 7 out of 8 oil and gas sites, in all 4 urban areas, and one out of the 2 rural background sites. The compound 1,4-dichlorobezene was detected in 3 out of 8 oil and gas sites, 3 out of 4 urban sites, and 1 out of 2 rural background sites. The benzene concentrations at one of the eight oil and gas sites was identified as cause for concern, because although it was within the acceptable range, it was near the upper limit of the range. The report concluded: "With the exception of the Brock site, these risk estimates do not appear to represent a significant theoretical cancer risk at any of the sites, nor does it appear that that the theoretical cancer risk is elevated at oil and gas development sites as compared to urban or rural background sites."

In 2011, the EPA released new emissions guidelines stating that the old standards could have led to an unacceptably high risk of cancers for those living near drilling operations.

=== Worker health ===
In 2013 the United States the Occupational Safety and Health Administration (OSHA) and the National Institute for Occupational Safety and Health (NIOSH) released a hazard alert based on data collected by NIOSH that "workers may be exposed to dust with high levels of respirable crystalline silica (silicon dioxide) during hydraulic fracturing." NIOSH notified company representatives of these findings and provided reports with recommendations to control exposure to crystalline silica and recommend that all hydraulic fracturing sites evaluate their operations to determine the potential for worker exposure to crystalline silica and implement controls as necessary to protect workers.

The EPA states in their Hydraulic Fracturing Study Plan (2011) that the exposure to hydraulic fracturing chemicals in an occupational setting needs to be examined to determine the acute and chronic effects on health. The exposure risks such as "transport, mixing, delivery, and potential accidents" have not been properly assessed (p. 57).

==== Silica exposure in hydraulic fracturing ====
Hydraulic fracturing sites have a visible bloom of dust, which causes an occupational health concern of exposure to respirable crystalline silica. Silicosis is an incurable lung disease associated with exposure to respirable crystalline silica or better known as silica dust. In addition to silicosis, exposure to crystalline silica is linked to lung cancer, pulmonary tuberculosis, kidney disease, autoimmune disorders and airway disease such as asthma and bronchitis. Most of these debilitating and potentially fatal diseases are preventable with occupational control measures regarding respirable crystalline exposure.

Hydraulic fracturing uses abundant amounts of sand in the process of fracturing as part of the hydraulic fluid. The fracturing fluid consists of a base fluid, proppant and chemical additives. The majority of proppant used in fracturing are made of silica (sand). Truckloads of sand are delivered to the sites, then loaded to sand movers that are then transferred to a blender that mixes the hydraulic fluid. The hydraulic fluid is injected at high pressure into the fracture. The proppant keeps the fracture open to allow more oil and gas to be extracted out.

Silicon dioxide (SiO2) is the chemical compound of silica, which is a prevalent component of rock, soil and sand. The most common form of silica is quartz, and it can break apart into dust microparticles that become respirable crystalline silica. The respirable crystalline silica are particles less than 10 microns (micrometers), which are small enough to enter the part of the lungs were oxygen and carbon dioxide gases are exchanged.

The preventable disabling disease of silicosis has three main types, chronic, acute and accelerated. Chronic silicosis is the most common occurring after 10–20 years of low to moderate exposure of respirable crystalline silica. Current studies have shown workers exposed to silica at the current recommend exposure limits (REL) during a lifetime of work develop chronic silicosis. A chest x-ray is used to diagnose chronic silicosis, which has similar symptoms as chronic obstructive pulmonary disease (COPD). General symptoms are shortness of breath, productive or nonproductive cough, fatigue, and occasionally respiratory failure. accelerated silicosis has similar symptoms as chronic silicosis, however it develops rapidly in 5–10 years of high exposure to respirable crystalline silica. Lastly, acute silicosis is less prevalent than the other types, however, it is a more severe disease with a high occurrence of disability and death. Acute silicosis develops between several months to years with extreme levels of silica exposure, and severe symptoms include shortness of breath, weakness, cough, fever and weight loss. Setting effective control levels and monitoring the adherence to those levels will be crucial in preventing silicosis.

NIOSH set the recommend exposure limit (REL) for silica at a fixed value of 0.05 milligrams per cubic meter as a time-weighted average (TWA) for up to a ten-hour shift during a forty-hour workweek. A NIOSH study that obtained 116 air samples at 11 different hydraulic fracturing sites found above REL levels of silica in 79% of samples. In this study, 31% of the samples indicated levels at least ten times the REL. N IOSH studied the levels of exposure at different parts of the fracturing process and found seven primary areas of high respirable crystalline silica exposure with transfer belts and sand movers as the highest . The knowledge obtained from these studies has provided OSHA, NIOSH, and the fracturing industry areas to focus on silica control measures .

According to NIOSH and OSHA, a combination of engineering controls, protective personal equipment, safety education, alternative proppant, and worksite safety practices are the key to protecting workers from respirable crystalline silica exposure. One particular engineering control that is used in field testing is the mini-baghouse that reduces the silica dust produced by the sand movers. Personal protective equipment is normally used in jobs with silica exposure, however, NIOSH discovered that incorrect respirators, a half mask type, was used and did not meet the silica exposure levels. NIOSH and OSHA recommend a full face air purifying respirator (PAPR) for all workers exposed to high levels of silica. Another control measure is using a silica substitute proppant such as sintered bauxite, ceramics, or resin-coated sand, however OSHA notes that the safety testing must be performed on these alternatives. Besides these controls measures, the recommend exposure limits (REL) and permissible exposure levels (PEL) need to be set lower than current levels. By June 2016, new regulations for silica will take effect, which lower the PEL to 50 micrograms per cubic meter of silica in the air.

A study by National Institute for Occupational Safety and Health concluded that an inhalation health hazard existed for workers exposed to crystalline silica (sand dust) at the evaluated hydraulic fracturing sites. NIOSH notified company representatives of these findings and provided reports with recommendations to control exposure to crystalline silica. NIOSH recommended that all hydraulic fracturing sites evaluate their operations to determine the potential for worker exposure to crystalline silica and implement controls as necessary to protect workers. Hydraulic fracturing also affects individuals nearby, like the case previously discussed about the nurse who became ill after exposure from treating a hydraulic fracturing worker (Frankowski, 2008).

==== Other concerns ====
A 2012 OSH article outlined the risk of worker radiation exposure.

=== Research and lobbying ===
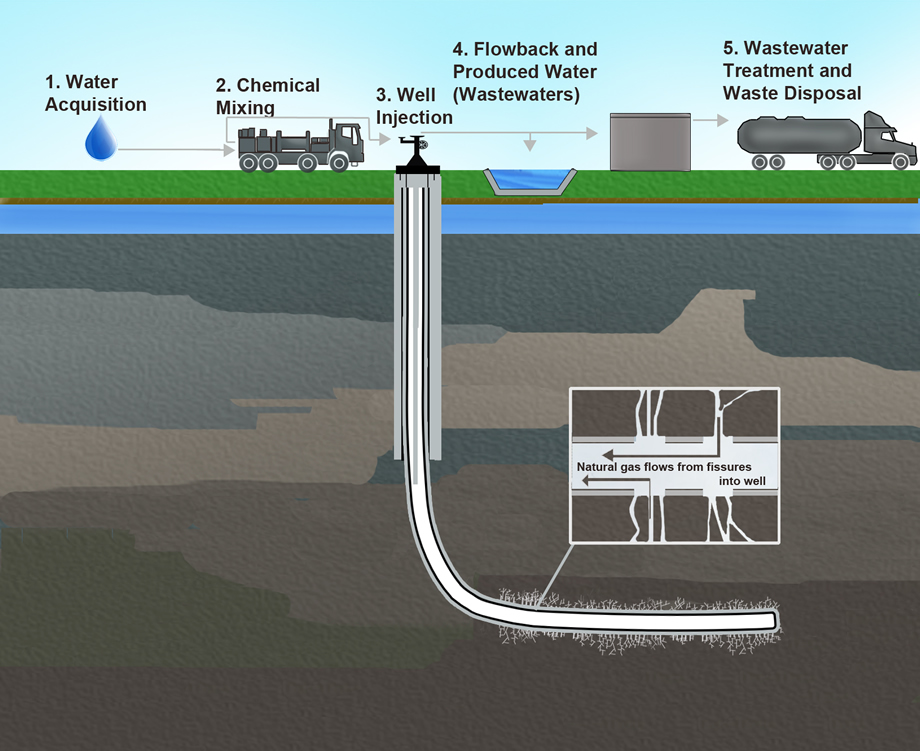
Illustration of hydraulic fracturing and related activities

The New York Times has reported that, since the 1980s, the EPA investigations into the oil and gas industry's environmental impact—including the ongoing one into fracking's potential impact on drinking water—and associated reports had been narrowed in scope and/or had negative findings removed due to industry and government pressure.

A 2004 EPA study on hydraulic fracturing in coalbed methane wells concluded that the process was safe, and didn't warrant further study, because there was "no unequivocal evidence" of health risks to groundwater, and the fluids were neither necessarily hazardous nor able to travel far underground. The EPA report did find uncertainties in knowledge of how fracturing fluid migrates through rocks, and recommended that diesel fuel not be used as a component of fracturing fluid in coalbed methane walls due to its potential as a source of benzene contamination; in response, well service companies agreed to stop using diesel fuel in coalbed methane wells. One of the authors of the 2004 EPA report noted that it studied only hydraulic fracturing in coalbed methane wells.

The New York Times cited Weston Wilson, the agency whistle-blower, that the results of the 2004 EPA study were influenced by industry and political pressure. An early draft of the study discussed the possibility of dangerous levels of hydraulic fracturing fluid contamination and mentioned "possible evidence" of aquifer contamination. The final report concluded simply that hydraulic fracturing "poses little or no threat to drinking water". The study's scope was narrowed so that it only focused on the injection of hydraulic fracturing fluids, ignoring other aspects of the process such as disposal of fluids and environmental concerns such as water quality, fish kills, and acid burns. The study was concluded before public complaints of contamination started emerging. The study's conclusion that the injection of hydraulic fracturing fluids into coalbed methane wells posed a minimal threat to underground drinking water sources may have influenced the 2005 Congressional decision that hydraulic fracturing should continue to be regulated by the states and not under the federal Safe Drinking Water Act.

A 2011 study by Congressional Democrats and reporting by the New York Times that same year found that hydraulic fracturing had resulted in significant increases of radioactive material including radium and carcinogens including benzene in major rivers and watersheds. At one site the amount of benzene discharged into the Allegheny River after treatment was 28 times accepted levels for drinking water. The congressional representatives called for better regulation and more disclosure.

In June 2015, the EPA released a report entitled "Assessment of the Potential Impacts of Hydraulic Fracturing for Oil and Gas on Drinking Water Resources" in which the EPA "did not find evidence that these mechanisms have led to widespread, systemic impacts on drinking water resources in the United States". However, the EPA also noted that the mechanisms assessed in the report were not considered "widespread" and that evaluation of identified cases rests on limiting factors that include "insufficient pre- and post-fracturing data on the quality of drinking water resources; the paucity of long-term systematic studies; the presence of other sources of contamination precluding a definitive link between hydraulic fracturing activities and an impact; and the inaccessibility of some information on hydraulic fracturing activities and potential impacts." The report suggested that two types of water withdrawals had potential for water resource contamination, namely ground water withdrawals and surface water withdrawals. Perhaps more controversial is the recent Final Rule that was suspended on September 30, 2015 by US District Judge Scott Skavdahl with the Wyoming District Court. Skavdahl entertained arguments that the regulative authority for hydraulic fracturing should rest with the EPA instead of the Bureau of Land Management. Colorado, Utah (including the Ute Indian Tribe of the northern area of the state), Wyoming, North Dakota, the Independent Petroleum Association of America and the Western Energy Alliance included statements that the new rule would interfere in state regulations and cause redundancies that could take away resources from other programs. Furthermore, Skavdahl considered the argument that the "final rules lack factual or scientific support" and that the opposition is supported by the recent publication of the June 2015 EPA report.

== Built Environment/Infrastructure ==
Hydraulic Fracturing's effects on built infrastructure are often underestimated. The fracking process requires heavy equipment and vast amount of water, chemicals, and other materials, thus transportation of that equipment, liquids, and materials, requires trucks with heavy tankers. This has caused infrastructure damage to local roads and bridges that were not designed and constructed to frequently withstand heavier loads.

Each individual fracking well requires a vast amount of truck traffic. Studies estimated that on average, to fracture (build and drill) a single well, between 1,760 and 1,904 truck trips are needed to transport equipment, chemicals, water and other materials; removing fracking wastes and transporting the natural gas require additional truck trips. The infrastructure deterioration caused by this heavy truck traffic has a huge economic impact/burden on local states. In July 2012, according to the Texas Department of Transportation, local fracking activities had cost an estimate of 2 billion dollars in damage to roads that connect drilling sites to storage sites. In Pennsylvania, a study conducted in 2014 based on data on the distribution of fracking well activity and the roadway type in the state estimated that the road reconstruction costs caused by additional heavy truck traffic from Marcellus Shale natural gas development in 2011 were about $13,000–$23,000 per well for all state roadway types.

Many similar studies are underway in different states to evaluate the potential infrastructure impact from fracking. However, existing evidence suggests that road and bridge deterioration from overloading infrastructure be taken into consideration when evaluating the environmental and economic cost of the fracking process.

== See also ==
- Environmental issues in the United States
- Exemptions for hydraulic fracturing under United States federal law
- Pollution in the United States
