= Central Valley groundwater pollution =

Groundwater pollution in Central Valley, California

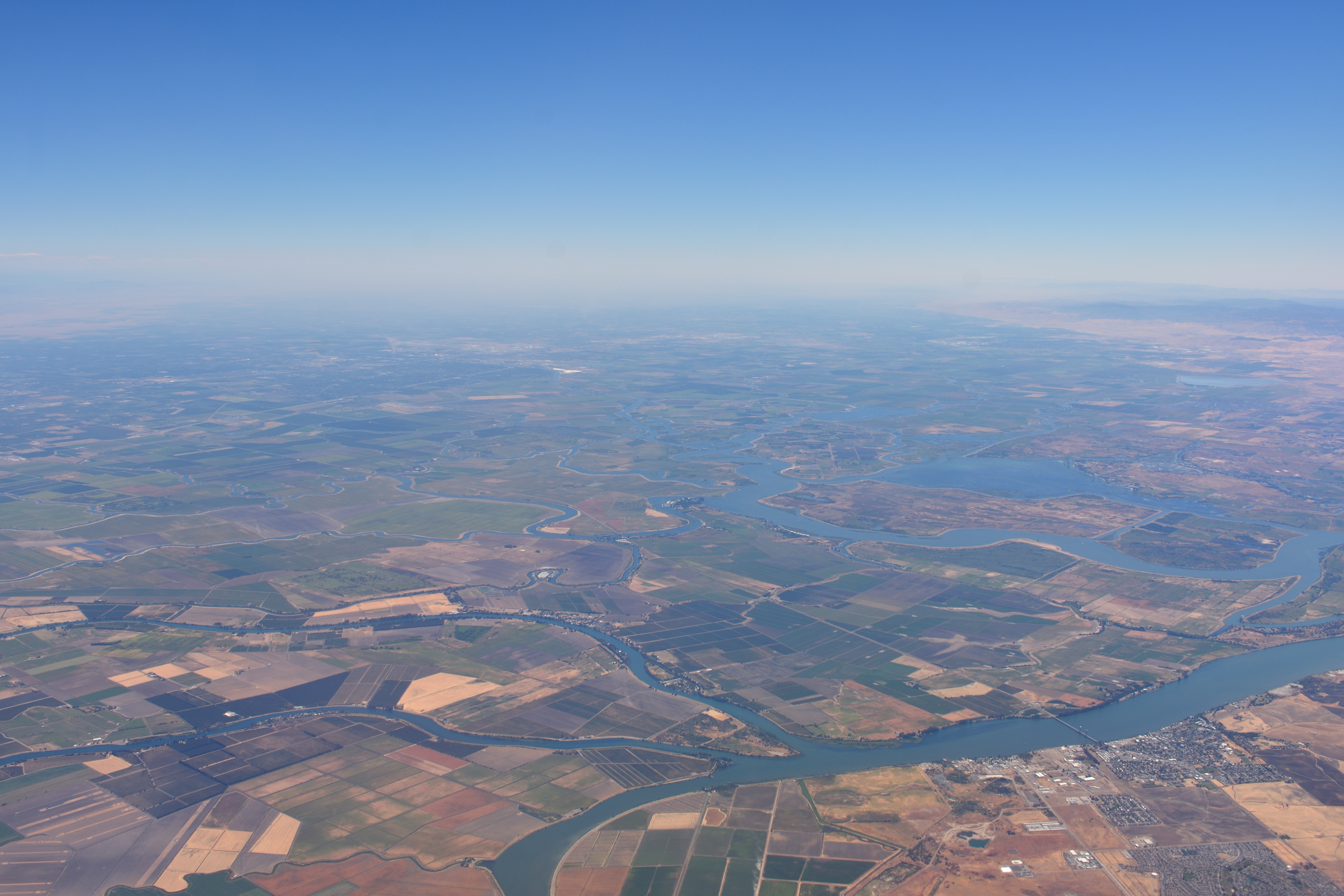
Aerial view of Central Valley waterways.

Groundwater pollution in the Central Valley of California affects aquifers that supply water for agriculture and drinking. The Central Valley, which includes both the Sacramento and San Joaquin Valleys, is also one of the most agricultural regions in the United States and relies heavily on groundwater resources.

Nitrates are the most abundant pollutants in the Central Valley due to agricultural runoff. Naturally occurring arsenic is also an issue. Manganese has been detected at levels pose health risks especially to young children and pregnant women due to its neurotoxic effects. This is a public health concern as groundwater is often the primary water source in the region.

== Background ==
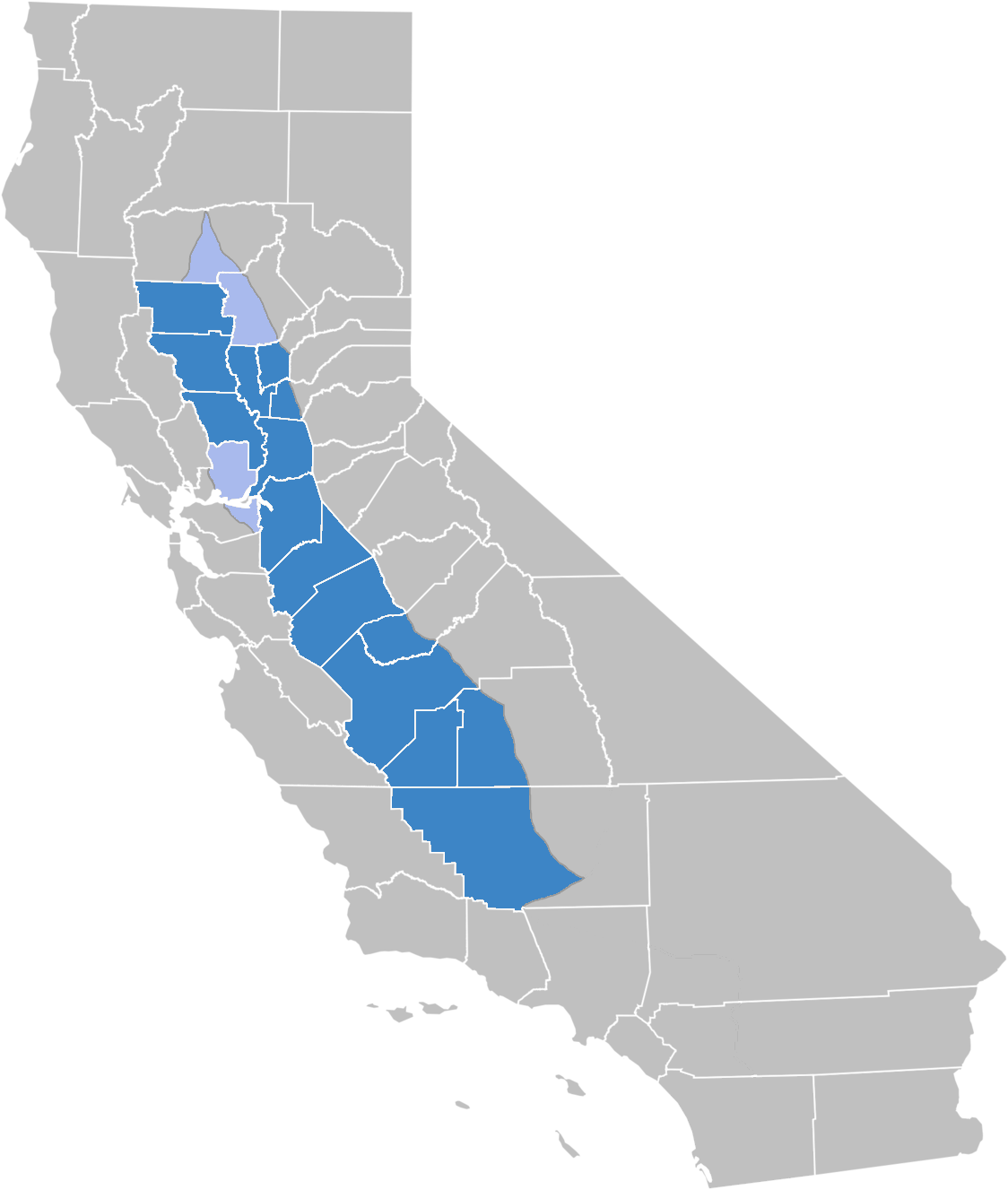
Map of the Central Valley region of California.

By the 20th century, advances in irrigation and agricultural practices transformed the Central Valley into a major agricultural region. As farming expanded groundwater extraction increased and became a primary source of water for both the communities and agriculture.

Increased agricultural activity and population growth have impacted groundwater systems. Rapid agricultural growth outpaced waste management practices contributing to contamination from fertilizers, septic systems, livestock, and nitrate pollution.

== Regulations and standards ==
Set by the California Department of Public Health in 1989, the maximum contaminant level for nitrates, in CCR §63341, is 45 milligrams per liter (mg/L) for nitrate as NO3 (equivalent to 10 mg/L for nitrate as nitrogen or “N”); 10 mg/L for nitrate plus nitrite as N; and 1 mg/L for nitrite as N. Currently, there is a secondary maximum contaminant level (MCL) for manganese, primarily based on aesthetic properties like taste and color, set at 0.05mg/L. However, health experts have raised concerns that manganese levels below this threshold could still pose risks, especially for neurodevelopment in children. Public wells are required to test their water annually and submit the results to the Department of Health, but private wells are not required to do so. A documented 98% of the state has access to drinkable water, though some studies note that access disparities exist.

The Californian Sustainable Groundwater Management Act of 2014 was the first of its kind to specify how to manage groundwater in a way that would not harm or endanger future generations' access to clean groundwater. Signed by Gov. Jerry Brown in 2014, this three-bill legislative package created a framework for preserving and managing groundwater at the local and state level. This creates a regulatory process mandating that Groundwater Sustainability Agencies (GSAs) to adopt Ground Water Sustainability Plans (GSPs) to manage supply. Before this act, regulations existed only at the federal level with the Safe Drinking Water Act and the Clean Water Act, which failed to protect Central Valley residents. Based on these laws, farms and oil drilling sites could not dump waste into the ground if it impacted clean drinking however, if the water was not suitable to drink, consumers and businesses could dump waste freely into the water, limiting access to drinking water by further contaminating sources already deemed undrinkable.

== Sources of contamination ==
Manure, fertilizer, and septic waste are the leading sources of nitrates in groundwater. Manure produces around 6.5 million tons of nitrogen, which, when not handled properly or with improper drainage methods, can contaminate soil and water sources. Nitrogen-based soil compounds produced by crops such as legumes, are consistently a minimal source. Fertilizers add roughly 11.5 million tons of nitrogen annually in the United States. Nitrogen in fertilizers is converted to nitrates, which is the main form of nitrogen in wastewater. Nitrogen from fertilizers can also be released into the atmosphere as ammonia gas, commonly recognized as a greenhouse gas. In the U.S. 53% of nitrates originate from fertilizers, making this a priority for Californian officials. Manganese contamination can result from both natural geological processes and human activities such as industrial and agricultural runoff. Elevated manganese in soil and water often correlates with agricultural zones due to natural weathering of manganese-containing minerals and contamination from fertilizers. Given manganese's potential risks, officials and health agencies are now advocating for enhanced filtration methods in affected communities.

== Population and health impacts ==
Groundwater contamination in the Central Valley affects rural and low-income communities that rely on groundwater as their main source of drinking water. Disadvantaged communities, mostly in the San Joaquin Valley, are more likely to be exposed to nitrate contaminated water and face greater obstacles accessing safe drinking water. These disparities are often due to infrastructure, lower household incomes, and reduced access to water treatment technologies. Communities that rely on small water systems or private wells may face higher risks because these systems are not always being monitored the same or regularly.

Long term exposure to nitrate contaminated drinking water has been associated with increased health risks including thyroid cancer and colorectal cancers. Elevated manganese exposure in drinking water has been linked to neurological and developmental effects, mostly in children and fetuses.
