= Exemptions for fracking under United States federal law =

There are many exemptions for fracking under United States federal law: the oil and gas industries are exempt or excluded from certain sections of a number of the major federal environmental laws. These laws range from protecting clean water and air, to preventing the release of toxic substances and chemicals into the environment: the Clean Air Act, Clean Water Act, Safe Drinking Water Act, National Environmental Policy Act, Resource Conservation and Recovery Act, Emergency Planning and Community Right-to-Know Act, and the Comprehensive Environmental Response, Compensation, and Liability Act, commonly known as Superfund.

== Hydraulic fracturing: background ==
The process of hydraulic fracturing

Hydraulic fracturing, also known as fracking, is a process used to extract oil and natural gas. The process to extract oil and natural gas begins with thousands of gallons of water, mixed with a slurry of chemicals, some of which are undisclosed. This liquid mixture is then forced into well casings under high pressure, and then is horizontally injected into bedrock to create cracks or fissures. The forced change in geologic structure allows gas molecules to escape, therefore allowing the natural gas to be harvested.

Hydraulic fracturing has changed the energy scene as a result of many technological advances. Fracking uses both historically-known vertical and horizontal drilling techniques which are used in tandem to extract oil and gas. This process can occur at depths over 10,000 feet deep.

The primary product of hydraulic fracturing is natural gas which consists mostly of methane.

== Clean Air Act ==
Congress passed the 1970 Clean Air Act to ensure that the general public was protected from harmful levels of criteria pollutants, established by the Environmental Protection Agency (EPA). The six regulated criteria pollutants include: particulate matter, lead, ozone, NO_{x}, carbon monoxide, and sulfur dioxide. All pollutant levels are calculated by associated health risks that would harm the most sensitive subgroup of people, which are considered to be inner city children. Any major pollution sources must abide by the National Emissions Standards for Hazardous Air Pollutants (NESHAP), by using the "Maximum Achievable Control Technology" (MACT) specified for their industry.

In 1977 and 1990, Congress amended the law to create provisions related to the Prevention of Significant Deterioration clauses as well as create programs related to controlling and preventing acid rain, respectively. However, under the act, major sources of hazardous air pollutants are required to obtain a "Title V" permit to ensure that the minimum standards are in place under the regulations, while area sources are not. Most oil and gas production sites are not required to obtain a Title V permit because their emissions threshold is just slightly below the categorical statutory definition. In addition to not having to obtain a Title V permit, the oil and gas exploration and production wells are exempt from the "Aggregation Rule" within the definition of "major source" as defined under the act, essentially to be unregulated under this federal statute.

== Clean Water Act ==
The Clean Water Act is a result of the 1972 amendments to the Federal Water Pollution Control Act, which was passed to ultimately eliminate pollution discharge into any body of water in the United States. One of the major mechanisms for implementing this statute was to create a permitting process for all discharging methods that involved dumping pollutants into streams, lakes, rivers, wetlands, or creeks. The National Pollution Discharge Elimination System (NPDES) permitting requirements apply to all phases of the petroleum industry. Petroleum industry waste, including frac flowback and produced water, cannot be discharged to the waters of the United States, except under an NPDES or equivalent state permit.

In 1987, Congress amended the Act, requiring the EPA to develop a permitting program for storm water runoff, but the exploration, production, and processing of oil and gas was exempt.

The Energy Policy Act of 2005 expanded the exemption to include exemptions for runoff from gas and oil construction activities which include "oil and gas exploration, production, process, or treatment operations and transmission facilities."

In 2006 EPA promulgated regulations that would not require oil and gas facilities to obtain storm water runoff permits, if the runoff is "composed entirely of storm water", which is defined as composed of "precipitation runoff" and "not contaminated by contact with or that has not come into contact with, any overburden, raw material, intermediate products, finished product, byproduct or waste products located on the site of such operations." Any discharges containing other than precipitation runoff, such as petroleum or produced wastewater are still subject to criminal prosecution under the Clean Water Act. EPA's 2006 rule was vacated by the United States Court of Appeals for the Ninth Circuit. Following the court ruling, the regulations published prior to 2006 have remained in effect.

== Safe Drinking Water Act ==
In 1974, the Safe Drinking Water Act (SDWA) was passed to protect the quality of U.S. public drinking water and aims to protect above and below ground water sources that are or could potentially be used for human consumption. Section C of the SDWA requires the EPA to establish minimum regulations for state Underground Injection Control Programs. Under part C, Section 1421 of the SDWA, underground injection is "the subsurface emplacement of fluids by well injection." The oil and gas industry makes extensive use of Class II injection wells, which are regulated under the SDWA. As of 2022 there are approximately 180,000 Class II wells injecting over 2 billion gallons of fluids daily. Most Class II wells are used for enhanced oil recovery, such as waterfloods. About 20 percent of Class II wells are used in waste disposal, to dispose of produced water, usually brine, into deep formations below the base of fresh water.

From the time of the passage of the 1974 SDWA, EPA declined to require Class II UIC permits for hydraulic fracturing. The agency maintained that it was not required to do so, because underground injection was not the "principal function" of the wells. The EPA also cited the "endangerment clause" in SWDA section 1421(b)(2), which directs the EPA to establish regulations which: "… are essential to assure that underground sources of drinking water will not be endangered by such injection." The agency stated that it did not consider hydraulic fracturing to be an endangerment to underground drinking water sources.

The policy was overturned in 1997 by the United States Court of Appeals for the Eleventh Circuit, which ruled that "hydraulic fracturing activities constitute underground injection according to Section C of the SDWA. This required the EPA and state underground injection control programs to regulate hydraulic fracturing under the SDWA.

The EPA responded with a study of potential and actual impacts of hydraulic fracturing of coalbed methane wells on drinking water, published in 2004. Section 7.4 of the report "concluded that the injection of hydraulic fracturing fluids into coalbed methane wells poses little or no threat to USDWs and does not justify additional study at this time." The exception was for frac fluids containing diesel fuel, which the EPA concluded could pose a threat.

The conclusions of the EPA report were incorporated into law the following year, by two amendments of the SDWA contained in the 2005 Energy Policy Act. The amendments added two exclusions to the definition of underground injection: ""(i) the underground injection of natural gas for purposes of storage; and (ii) the underground injection of fluids or propping agents (other than diesel fuels) pursuant to hydraulic fracturing operations related to oil, gas, or geothermal production activities. This provision became known to its critics as the "Halliburton loophole" named after the oil services firm Halliburton.

== National Environmental Policy Act ==
The National Environmental Policy Act (NEPA) of 1969 requires federal agencies to conduct an environmental assessment for all major actions potentially affecting the environment. If the assessment determines that the federal action may significantly alter the environment, then an environmental impact statement (EIS) is required.

The Energy Policy Act of 2005 created a rebuttable presumption that certain oil and gas related activities authorized by the U.S. Department of the Interior in managing public lands, and the U.S. Department of Agriculture in managing National Forest System lands are subject to a "categorical exclusion" under NEPA, and do not require an EIS, unless it can be demonstrated that they pose a risk to the environment, Congress specified five circumstances for which there would be such a rebuttable presumption that an additional EIS is not required:

1. Individual surface disturbances of less than five (5) acres so long as the total surface disturbance on the lease is not greater than 150 acres (61 ha) and site-specific analysis in a document prepared pursuant to NEPA has been previously completed.

2. Drilling an oil and gas well at a location or well pad site at which drilling has occurred previously within five (5) years prior to the date of spudding the well.

3. Drilling an oil or gas well within a developed field for which an approved land use plan or any environmental document prepared pursuant to NEPA analyzed such drilling as a reasonably foreseeable activity, so long as such plan or document was approved within five (5) years prior to the date of spudding the well

4. Placement of a pipeline in an approved right-of-way corridor, so long as the corridor was approved within five (5) years prior to the date of placement of the pipeline.

5. Maintenance of a minor activity, other than any construction or major renovation o(f) a building or facility.

Other than for the exclusions listed above, federal agencies are required by NEPA to do Environmental Impact Statements to evaluate any oil and gas activities which have the potential to seriously affect the environment. Such EIS's are routinely done for specific areas by the U.S. Forest Service, the Bureau of Land Management, and the Bureau of Ocean Energy Management.

== Resource Conservation and Recovery Act ==
The Resource Conservation and Recovery Act (RCRA) of 1976 was passed "to protect human health and the environment from the potential hazards of waste disposal, to conserve energy and natural resources, to reduce the amount of waste generated, and to ensure that wastes are managed in an environmentally sound manner." Subtitle C of RCRA gives the EPA the authority to regulate the generation, transport, treatment, storage and disposal of all deemed hazardous waste.

In December 1978, the EPA issued its proposed RCRA regulations. For RCRA Subtitle C (hazardous waste management), the EPA defined six categories of "special wastes," which were generated in high volumes and were believed to be less hazardous than the other wastes for which RCRA Subtitle C was designed. Among the special wastes were included cement kiln dust, fly ash, mining wastes, and wastes from oil, gas, and geothermal exploration and production. The oil, gas, and geothermal wastes included drilling fluids, produced waters, and other wastes associated with oil and natural gas exploration, development, or production. The EPA proposed that regulation of special wastes under Subtitle C, be deferred until further study.

Prior to the completion of the EPA's regulatory determination, Congress enacted the Solid Waste Disposal Act in 1980 which exempted oil field wastes under section C of RCRA unless the EPA determined that the waste was hazardous.

Each of the six special waste categories was the subject of separate EPA study. In July 1988, the EPA finished its study of oil, gas, and geothermal production wastes, in which it concluded that they did not warrant regulation under RCRA Subtitle C, but noted that they would continue to be regulated under Subtitle D (solid waste disposal). The EPA's decision was based on its determinations that oil, gas, and geothermal production was already regulated by the states, that Subtitle C did not have the regulatory flexibility to deal effectively with the wastes, and that the permitting requirements of Subtitle C would impose unreasonable delays on oil, gas, and geothermal extraction. However, the EPA report identified regulatory gaps for oil and gas wastes, for which it recommended additional rules under existing EPA regulatory authority, under RCRA Subtitle D, the Clean Water Act, and the Safe Water Drinking Act.

Federal regulation of the storage of petroleum was established by the Oil Pollution Act of 1990.

== Emergency Planning and Community Right-to-Know Act ==
The Emergency Planning and Community Right-to-Know Act, or EPCRA was passed by Congress in 1986 to help communities plan for emergencies that involve hazardous substance spills or releases. The Act requires federal, state, local governments and Indian tribes to inform the public of hazardous and toxic chemicals being used or stored at facilities, their use, and any release into the environment. The provisions of the EPCRA include emergency planning (Sections 301-303), and emergency release notification (Section 304).

The Toxics Release Inventory Reporting (Section 313) of "EPCRA requires the EPA and States to collect data on releases and transfers of listed toxic chemicals." The facilities required to report releases and transfers under section 313 are those in certain industries on a Standard Industrial Classification list determined by the EPA. The EPA has steadily expanded the law's coverage by adding new industrial classifications to the list. As of 2014, the oil and gas industry has not been added to the list, and is therefore exempt from the EPCRA Section 313.

== Comprehensive Environmental Response, Compensation, and Liability Act (Superfund) ==
The Comprehensive Environmental Response, Compensation, and Liability Act, also known as Superfund, was enacted in 1980 to clean up sites where toxic or hazardous substances have been dumped into the environment. The law can be retroactively implemented, and all potentially polluting parties can be held responsible for the costs. As of March 26, 2015, there have been a total of 1,709 Superfund sites, of which 386 (23%) have been remediated.

Under Section 9601(14) of CERCLA, hazardous waste definitions exclude crude petroleum, including crude oil, natural gas liquids, and any of their component fractions. Included in the exemption are refined petroleum products, such as gasoline and diesel fuel, insofar as their content of naturally occurring petroleum compounds. If any spills that would be otherwise classified under the Superfund contain only petroleum compounds, they are exempt from the cleanup process associated with CERCLA. The petroleum exemption does not extend to hazardous contaminants such as PCBs or pesticides, which are sometimes mixed with petroleum product. "Moreover, if the petroleum product and an added hazardous substance are so commingled that, as a practical matter, they cannot be separated, then the entire oil spill is subject to CERCLA response authority." As of 1987, there were at least 153 CERCLA Superfund sites that included waste oil.

Despite the petroleum exemption, the EPA has exercised its power under CERCLA to intervene where it considers oil and gas operations to pose "imminent and substantial danger to the public health or welfare." Citing its CERCLA authority, the EPA has investigated instances of groundwater pollution it believed were related to oil and gas wells, including those at Pavillion, Wyoming, Dimock, Pennsylvania, and a Marcellus shale gas well in Bradford County, Pennsylvania.

Congress addressed petroleum contamination in the 1986 Superfund Amendments and Reauthorization Act, which authorized the EPA to enforce the environmental cleanup of petroleum hydrocarbons released from underground storage tanks. The act also established the Leaking Underground Storage Tank Trust Fund, to fund cleanup of petroleum hydrocarbon released from underground storage tanks at places such as gasoline stations. Sites contaminated by petroleum from leaking underground storage tanks are much more widespread and numerous than CERCLA Superfund sites. The EPA notes that nearly every community has petroleum contamination beneath present or former gasoline stations. As of September 2014, the federally financed but mostly state-run leaking underground storage tank program has found 521,271 petroleum releases from underground storage tanks at 205,000 facilities, 86% of which have been remediated. In fiscal year 2014, 6,847 new leaking tanks were discovered. The program is financed by a federal 0.1-cent tax on petroleum products.

== Debates surrounding regulatory exemptions ==
There have been many debates about the regulatory exemptions for hydraulic fracturing. It has been noted that if not for the exemption for hydraulic fracturing in the Energy Policy Act of 2005 or the RCRA exemption that exempts oil and gas waste from being designated as a hazardous waste, underground injection would have included fracking operations, and the EPA would have had the power to further regulate it as well as enforcing disclosure requirements.

The oil and gas industry supports the idea that states should control the regulatory specificities of fracking. Some contend that these exemptions are carefully analyzed. A 2004 EPA study concluded that fracking injection in coalbed methane wells "posed little or no threat to drinking water;" the study has since been contraverted. and some still contend that there is a lack of funded studies to show a large scale degree of fracking fluid polluted groundwater. Many oil and gas companies contend that the regulations currently in place are sufficient.

The June 2015 draft report of an ongoing EPA study on fracking effects on drinking water listed a number of mechanisms by which fracking can degrade drinking water. The draft report noted among its major findings:

We did not find evidence that these mechanisms have led to widespread, systemic impacts on drinking water resources in the United States. Of the potential mechanisms identified in this report, we found specific instances where one or more mechanisms led to impacts on drinking water resources, including contamination of drinking water wells. The number of identified cases, however, was small compared to the number of hydraulically fractured wells.

This finding could reflect a rarity of effects on drinking water resources, but may also be due to other limiting factors. These factors include: insufficient pre- and post-fracturing data on the quality of drinking water resources; the paucity of long-term systematic studies; the presence of other sources of contamination precluding a definitive link between hydraulic fracturing activities and an impact; and the inaccessibility of some information on hydraulic fracturing activities and potential impacts.
