= Alexander Peddie =

Scottish physician and author

Dr. Alexander Peddie

Alexander Peddie FRSE FRCPE (3 June 1810 – 19 January 1907) was a Scottish physician and author. He was president of the Royal College of Physicians of Edinburgh from 1877 until 1879, and was co-founder of Royal Hospital for Sick Children, Edinburgh.

== Life ==
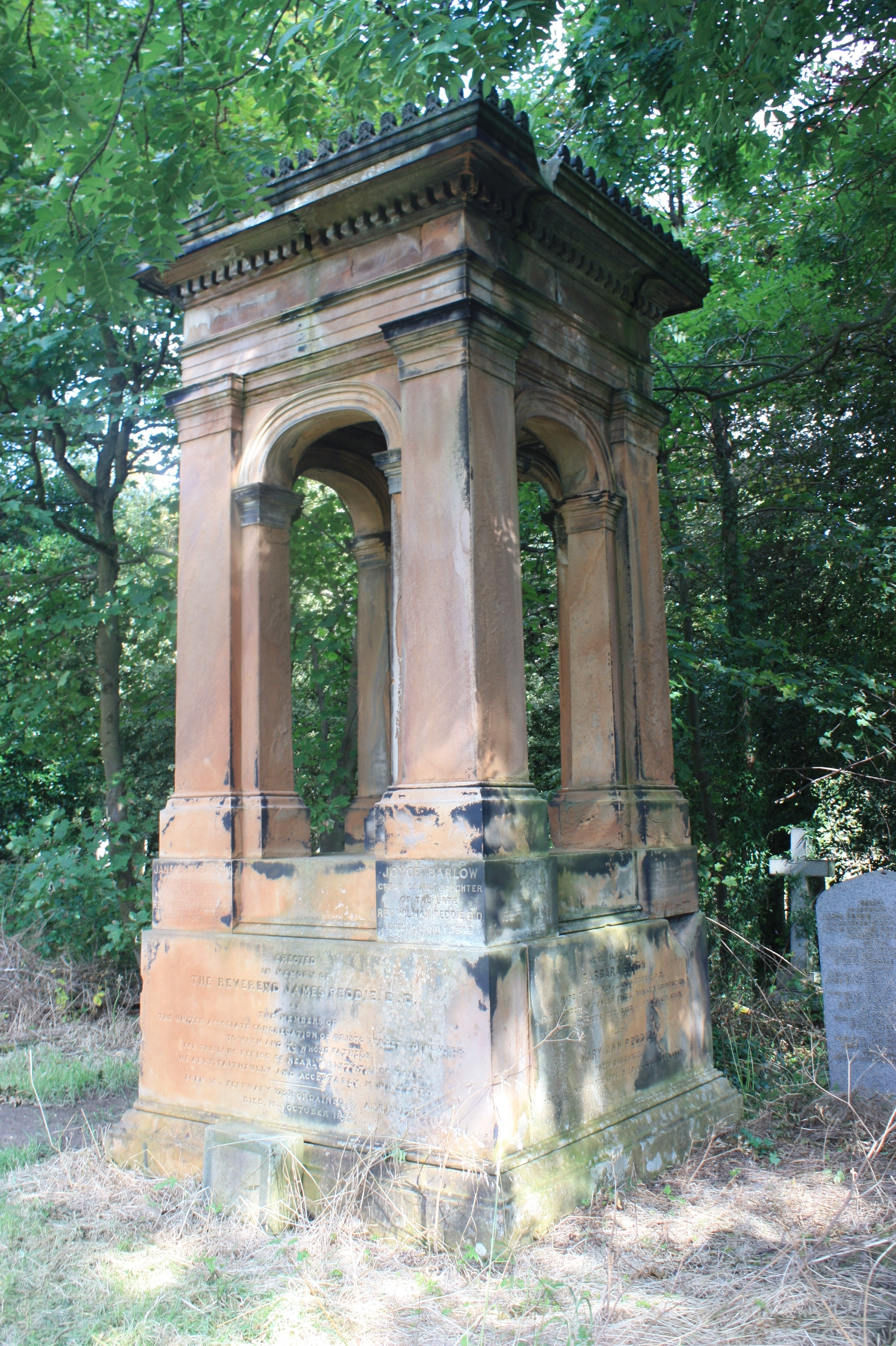
The Peddie monument, Warriston Cemetery

He was the son of James Peddie, born at Bristo Street in Edinburgh. He attended the school of William Lennie and Edinburgh High School. After four years as a bank clerk, he became an apprentice to the Edinburgh surgeon James Syme. He obtained an M.D. degree from University of Edinburgh in 1835.

In 1846 Peddie was elected a member of the Harveian Society of Edinburgh and served as president in 1890.

Peddie died at his home at 15 Rutland Street, in the West End of Edinburgh, on 19 January 1907.

== Family ==
Peddie married in 1844 Clara Elizabeth Sibbald Anderson, daughter of Thomas Anderson, a surgeon in Selkirk. The couple had four sons and four daughters. Their daughter Clara Sibbald Peddie (died 1895) attended the Nightingale School, and became a lecturer in nursing at King's College Hospital. Of the sons, two were educated at Elizabeth College, Guernsey: Alexander (born 1853) who emigrated to the United States; and Henry Anderson (1858–1946), who became a physician and went into practice in Edinburgh.
