= Sarah C. Mangelsdorf =

American academic and university administrator (born 1958)

- Mangelsdorf in 2024

11th President of the University of Rochester
- Incumbent
- Assumed office July 1, 2019
- Preceded by: Richard Feldman (interim)

4th CEO of the University of Rochester
- Incumbent
- Assumed office July 1, 2019
- Preceded by: Joel Seligman

Provost of the University of Wisconsin–Madison
- In office 2014 – 2019
- Preceded by: Paul M. DeLuca Jr.
- Succeeded by: Karl Scholz

Personal details
- Born: February 7, 1958 (age 68) Swarthmore, Pennsylvania, U.S.
- Education: Oberlin College; University of Minnesota
- Website: www.rochester.edu/president

Sarah Charlotte Mangelsdorf is an American educator, scholar, and the eleventh president of the University of Rochester.

== Career ==
As a psychologist, the focus of Mangelsdorf's research has been on the social and emotional development of infants and toddlers. She has held leadership positions at Northwestern University and the University of Illinois Urbana-Champaign.

Mangelsdorf was provost at the University of Wisconsin–Madison, where she was credited with advancing fundraising, coping with budget cuts, improving the school's overall ranking, successfully retaining key faculty members, and improving relations with the state of Wisconsin. Her responsibilities at Madison included oversight of all academic programs for its twelve colleges and schools, including budgeting.

Mangelsdorf became the eleventh president of the University of Rochester in July 2019. She is the first woman to hold that post.

== Personal life ==
Mangelsdorf is married to Karl Rosengren, a developmental psychologist at the University of Rochester.

Mangelsdorf is a graduate of Oberlin College and earned a doctorate in child psychology from the University of Minnesota.

Her father, Paul Christoph Mangelsdorf Jr., was a physics professor at Swarthmore College, and her grandfather Paul Christoph Mangelsdorf was a professor of botany at Harvard University.

Academic offices
Preceded by Joel Seligman	11th President of the University of Rochester; July 1, 2019 – present	Succeeded by Incumbent
