= Catherine Graham, Duchess of Montrose =

Scottish noblewoman

Her Grace The Duchess of Montrose
- Born: Catherine Elizabeth McDonnell Young; 5 September 1935; Winnipeg, Canada
- Died: 29 October 2014 (aged 79); Larbert, Scotland
- Education: Balmoral Hall School
- Alma mater: University of Manitoba; Queen's University
- Spouse: The 8th Duke of Montrose (m. 1970)
- Children: 3, including James Alexander Norman Graham, Marquess of Graham
- Parent(s): Norman Andrew Thomson Young; Mary Moody

Catherine Elizabeth McDonnell Graham, Duchess of Montrose (née Young; 5 September 1935 – 29 October 2014) was a Canadian-Scottish philanthropist. She was the wife of The 8th Duke of Montrose.

== Early years ==
She was born in Winnipeg, Canada, the daughter of Norman Andrew Thomson Young and his wife, Mary (née Moody), of Cornish origin. Her father was the first headmaster of the prestigious Ravenscourt School in Winnipeg. He was also an officer in the Queen's Own Cameron Highlanders of Canada and was killed on active service in France in 1942.

She attended Balmoral Hall School in Winnipeg. She obtained her further education at the University of Manitoba and Queen's University at Kingston.

== Personal life ==
On 31 January 1970, she married James Graham, then known as Marquess of Graham. She immediately became known as Marchioness of Graham, and in 1992, when her husband inherited his father's titles, she became the Duchess of Montrose.

Together, they had three children:

- Lady Hermione Elizabeth Graham (b. 1971), who married Christopher John Thornhill.
- James Alexander Norman Graham, Marquess of Graham (b. 1973), who married Cecilia Manfredi.
- Lord Ronald John Christopher Graham (b. 1975), who married Florence Mary Arbuthnott.

Following their marriage, the couple moved permanently to Scotland, where they lived at Auchmar House near Loch Lomond (the ancestral seat Buchanan Castle in Drymen having become dilapidated years earlier). The duchess died, aged 79, at Forth Valley Royal Hospital in Larbert, Scotland.

=== Philanthropy ===
After the establishment of the Preshal Trust, a charity based in Govan, the duchess became one of its leading supporters. "In her latter years, the Duchess supported countless charities and causes" including the "Red Cross, the Christmas carol concert on behalf of Cancer Research UK at Glasgow Cathedral, the Scotland's Gardens scheme to open gardens to the public, and the annual Women of Scotland Lunch to celebrate the achievements of Scottish women."
