= Asahel C. Kendrick =

Asahel Clark Kendrick
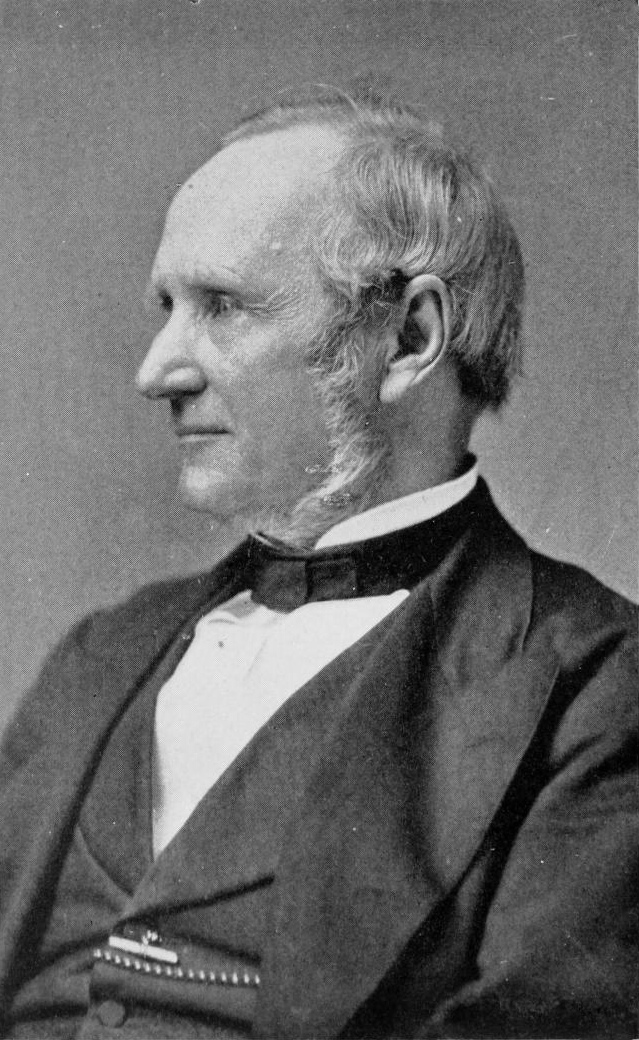
- Born: December 7, 1809; Poultney, Vermont, U.S.
- Died: October 21, 1895 (aged 85); Rochester, New York, U.S.
- Education: Hamilton College
- Occupations: Classicist, grammarian, exegete
- Employer: University of Rochester
- Children: 1 son, 4 daughters

Asahel Clark Kendrick (December 7, 1809 – October 21, 1895) was an American classicist, grammarian and exegete. He was the first professor of Greek at the University of Rochester. He was the author of textbooks on Greek grammar, and a contributor to the Revised Version of the New Testament.

== Early life ==
Kendrick was born on December 7, 1809, in Poultney, Vermont. His father, Clark Kendrick, was a Baptist missionary. Kendrick graduated from Hamilton College in 1831.

== Career ==
Kendrick began his career at Madison University, later known as Colgate University, as a professor of Greek and Latin. He taught Latin until 1850, when he became the first professor of Greek at the University of Rochester. Kendrick was also appointed as the executive officer while the trustees carried out their presidential search and appointed Martin Brewer Anderson. Kendrick spent 1852-1854 in Greece, Germany and Italy. He returned to the United States, and he held the Monroe professorship in Greek at the University of Rochester until 1885. He was the president of the American Philological Association and an associate fellow of the American Academy of Arts and Sciences in 1873. He authored textbooks about Greek grammar, including a revised version of The Principles of Greek Grammar by Peter Bullions.

Kendrick also taught Hebrew and New Testament interpretation at the Rochester Theological Seminary from 1865 to 1868. He served on the committee for the Revised Version of the New Testament from 1872 to 1880, and he wrote exegeses on the New Testament.

== Personal life and death ==
Kendrick resided at 301 Alexander Street in Rochester, New York. He had a son and four daughters. His son, James Ryland Kendrick, taught Latin and Greek at the University of Rochester.

Kendrick's brother James Ryland Kendrick (1821-1889) was a Baptist minister and served in 1885 as acting president of Vassar College. Kendrick's niece Belle Kendrick Abbott (1842-1893) was an author and journalist.

Kendrick died on October 21, 1895, in Rochester, New York.

== Selected works ==
- Kendrick, A. C. (1847). An Introduction to the Greek Language: Containing an Outline of the Grammar, with Appropriate Exercises. Hamilton, New York: M.H. Newman & co.
- Kendrick, A. C. (1857). Biblical Commentary on the New Testament. New York: Blakemore & Co. OCLC 427472338.
- Bullions, Peter; Kendrick, A. C. (1866). The Principles of Greek Grammar, with Complete Indexes: For Schools and Colleges. New York: Sheldon & Co. OCLC 4918855.
- Kendrick, A. C. (1869). Greek Exercises Adapted to Kendrick's Edition of Bullions's Greek Grammar. New York: Sheldon and Co. OCLC 669374395.
- Kendrick, A. C. (1883). Greek Ollendorff: Being a Progressive Exhibition of the Principles of the Greek Grammar: Designed for Beginners in Greek, and as a Book of Exercises for Academies and Colleges. New York: D. Appleton and Co. OCLC 235697699.
- Kendrick, A. C. (1870). Our Poetical Favorites: A Selection from the Best Minor Poems of the English Language. Boston: Sheldon & Company. OCLC 8531895.
