= David Jayne Hill =

American academic administrator and diplomat (1850–1932)

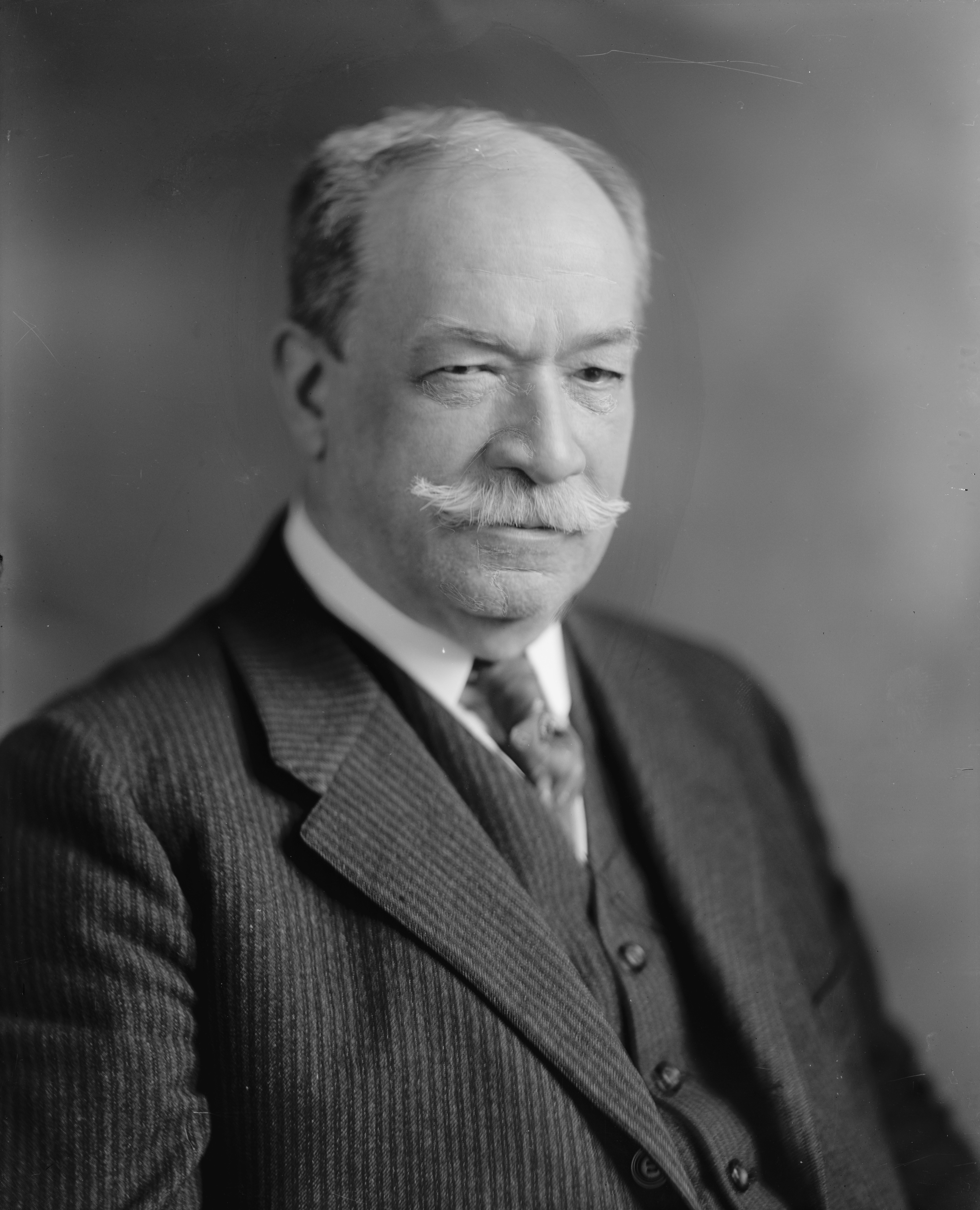
- Hill, 1905–1932

United States Ambassador to Germany
- In office June 14, 1908 – September 2, 1911
- President: Theodore Roosevelt; William Howard Taft
- Preceded by: Charlemagne Tower Jr.
- Succeeded by: John G. A. Leishman

United States Ambassador to the Netherlands
- In office July 15, 1905 – June 1, 1908
- Preceded by: Stanford Newel
- Succeeded by: Arthur M. Beaupre

United States Ambassador to Switzerland
- In office January 7, 1903 – July 1, 1905
- Preceded by: Arthur Sherburne Hardy
- Succeeded by: Brutus J. Clay II

24th United States Assistant Secretary of State
- In office October 25, 1898 – January 28, 1903
- Preceded by: John Bassett Moore
- Succeeded by: Francis Loomis

2nd President of the University of Rochester
- In office 1889–1896
- Preceded by: Martin Brewer Anderson
- Succeeded by: Benjamin Rush Rhees

Personal details
- Born: June 10, 1850 Plainfield, New Jersey, U.S.
- Died: March 2, 1932 (aged 81) Washington, D.C., U.S.
- Party: Republican
- Spouses: Anna Amelia Liddell (m. 1874; died 1880) Juliet Lewis Packer (m. 1886; died 1923)
- Profession: Academic, diplomat, author

David Jayne Hill (June 10, 1850 – March 2, 1932) was an American academic, diplomat and author. He was president of Bucknell University and the University of Rochester.

== Early life ==
The son of Baptist minister David T. Hill, David Jayne Hill was born in Plainfield, New Jersey, on June 10, 1850. He graduated from Bucknell University in 1874 and was professor of rhetoric there from 1877 to 1879. In 1878 he received his Master of Arts degree, and he was a member of Phi Beta Kappa society. He also undertook graduate studies at the University of Berlin and the University of Paris.

== Career ==
In 1879, Hill received his ordination and was appointed Bucknell's president, becoming the first occupant of the school's President's House. From 1889 to 1896, he was president of the University of Rochester. In 1888 and 1897 he studied at the Ecole Libre des Sciences Politiques in Paris.

In 1900, he received an honorary Docteur ès lettres from the University of Geneva. He received an honorary LL.D. from Colgate University in 1884 and he received additional honorary degrees from Union University (1902), and the University of Pennsylvania (1902). He was elected to the American Philosophical Society in 1910.

He was later a professor of European diplomacy at the School of Comparative Jurisprudence and Diplomacy.

=== Diplomatic career ===
Hill began a diplomatic career when he was appointed Assistant Secretary of State in 1898, serving to 1903.

He was appointed United States Minister to Switzerland in 1903. Two years later he was appointed United States Minister to the Netherlands and Luxembourg.

From 1908 to 1911 he was Ambassador to Germany. He was also a member of the Permanent Administrative Council of The Hague Tribunal.

Hill was an unsuccessful Republican candidate for the United States Senate from New York in 1914.

=== Later career ===
During World War I he wrote articles critical of Woodrow Wilson's decision to ask for a declaration of war and the Wilson administration's conduct of the war effort. In July 1920 he was chairman of the Republican State Convention in New York.

In 1922 Hill received France's Grand Officer of the Legion of Honor.

== Personal life ==
In 1874, Hill married Anna Amelia Liddell. Together they had three sons; Anna died two weeks after giving birth to her third child.

- Walter Hill (1875–1944)
- Arthur Hill (1878–1884)
- David Jayne Hill Jr. (born and died in 1880).

In 1886, he married Juliet Lewis Packer (1853–1923). They were the parents of twins:

- Catherine Hill (1890–1973)
- David Jayne Hill Jr. (1890–1975).

Juliet Hill died in Washington, D.C., after being struck by a delivery wagon while crossing the street. He died in Washington, D.C., on March 2, 1932.

== Works ==
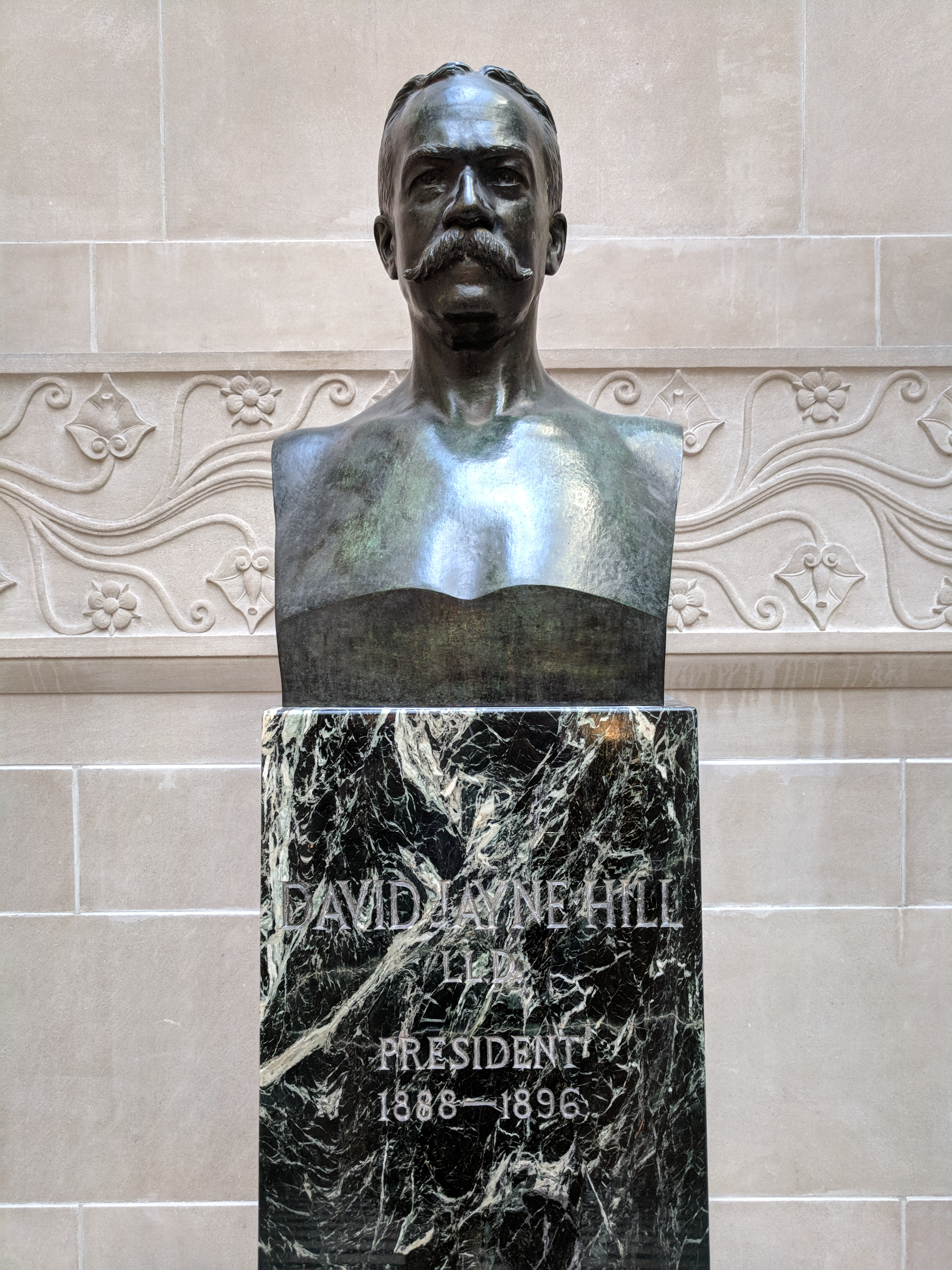
Bust of Hill displayed at the Rush Rhees Library on the campus of the University of Rochester

Hill was an author of biography and also wrote works on religion, psychology, and other topics. His published works include:

- The Life of William Cullen Bryant (1878)
- The Science of Rhetoric (1877)
- Elements of Rhetoric and Composition (1878)
- The Life of Washington Irving (1879)
- The Elements of Psychology (1886)
- The Social Influence of Christianity (1888)
- Principles and Fallacies of Socialism (1888)
- Genetic Philosophy (1893)
- An Honest Dollar the Basis of Prosperity (1900)
- The Conception and Realization of Neutrality (1902)
- The Contemporary Development of Diplomacy (1904)
- History of Diplomacy in the International Development of Europe, embracing A Struggle for Universal Empire (1905)
- The Establishment of Territorial Sovereignty (1906)
- World Organization as Affected by the Nature of the Modern State (1911)
- The Diplomacy of the Age of Absolutism (1914)
- The People's Government (1915)
- Americanism: What It Is (1916)
- The Rebuilding of Europe (1917)
- Impressions of the Kaiser (1918)
- Present Problems in Foreign Policy (1919)
- American World Policies (1920)

Academic offices
Preceded by Francis Wayland Tustin	President of Bucknell University; 1879–1888	Succeeded by George G. Groff
Preceded by Martin Brewer Anderson	President of the University of Rochester; 1889–1896	Succeeded by Benjamin Rush Rhees
Political offices
Preceded by John Bassett Moore	United States Assistant Secretary of State; October 25, 1898 – January 28, 1903	Succeeded by Francis Butler Loomis
Diplomatic posts
Preceded by Charles Page Bryan	United States Ambassador to Switzerland; January 7, 1903 – July 1, 1905	Succeeded by Brutus J. Clay II
Preceded by Stanford Newel	United States Ambassador to the Netherlands; July 15, 1905 – June 1, 1908	Succeeded by Arthur M. Beaupre
Preceded by Charlemagne Tower, Jr.	United States Ambassador to Germany; June 14, 1908 – September 2, 1911	Succeeded by John G.A. Leishman
