= Belle Kendrick Abbott =

American author

Isabella "Belle" Kendrick Abbott (November 3, 1842 – December 27, 1893) was an American author from the Deep South, whose only published novel, Leah Mordecai, was issued in 1875.

Abbott was born in Barnesville, Georgia, the daughter of Samuel S. Kendrick. Greek scholar Asahel C. Kendrick was an uncle. She married Benjamin F. Abbott in 1866, and lived for many years on Peachtree Street, between Cain Street (subsequently renamed International Boulevard) and Harris Street.

== Notable works ==
Leah Mordecai
- Author: Belle K. Abbott
- Publisher: Baker, Pratt & Company
- Publication date: 1875
- Pages: 238 pp

Leah Mordecai was published at Christmastime 1875, when Abbott was 33. It is a coming of age story set in Charleston, South Carolina, during the 1850s, shortly before the Civil War. The title character, who is Jewish, finds herself subjected to scorn and abuse by the jealous and grasping woman who marries her widowed father, a wealthy banker. Seeking relief from her unhappiness, Leah only engenders further distress when, upon entering into marriage with an importunate gentile, she incurs the violent wrath of her father.

In 1889 Abbott published a series of four articles in the Atlanta Constitution on "The Cherokee Indians in Georgia", based in part on interviews she had done.
