= James Graham, 8th Duke of Montrose =

Scottish nobleman and politician

His Grace The Duke of Montrose OStJ
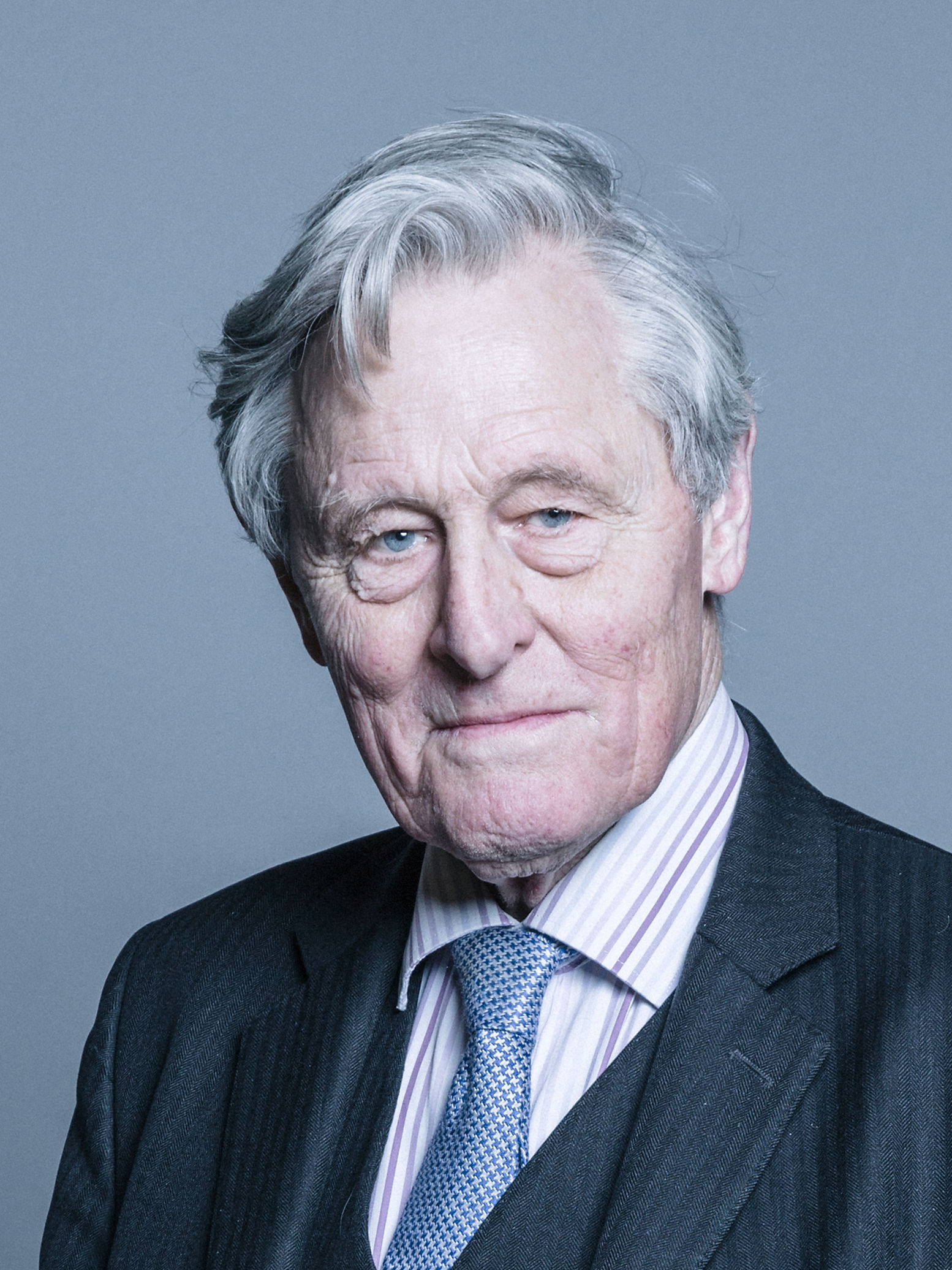
- Official portrait, 2018

Member of the House of Lords
- Lord Temporal
- Hereditary peerage 6 May 1995 – 11 November 1999
- Preceded by: The 7th Duke of Montrose
- Succeeded by: Seat abolished
- Elected Hereditary Peer; 11 November 1999 – 29 April 2026
- Election: 1999
- Preceded by: Seat established
- Succeeded by: Seat abolished

Personal details
- Born: James Graham; 6 April 1935 (age 91) Southern Rhodesia
- Party: Conservative
- Spouse: Catherine MacDonell Young (m. 1970; died 2014)
- Children: Lady Hermione Thornhill; James, Marquess of Graham; Lord Ronald Graham
- Parent(s): Angus Graham, 7th Duke of Montrose; Isabel Veronica Sellar (Note: Contemporary newspapers spell her forename Veronica. Some later compilations misprint it as Veronia.)

James Graham, 8th Duke of Montrose, OStJ (born 6 April 1935), styled Earl of Kincardine until 1954 and Marquess of Graham between 1954 and 1992, is a Rhodesian-Scottish hereditary peer, hill farmer and former Conservative politician in the House of Lords.

== Biography ==
=== Early life ===
James Graham was born on 6 April 1935 in Southern Rhodesia, where his father—the then Marquess of Graham—was establishing a farm. He attended boarding school in Scotland, first in Aberdeenshire and then at Loretto School, near Edinburgh.

He was appointed Officer, Most Venerable Order of the Hospital of Saint John of Jerusalem (OStJ) in 1978. He served as Brigadier of the Royal Company of Archers in 1986.

=== Marriage ===
On 31 January 1970, the Marquess of Graham married Catherine Elizabeth MacDonell Young (d. 29 October 2014), daughter of Queen's Own Cameron Highlanders officer Capt. Norman Andrew Thompson Young, of Ottawa, Canada.

They have three children:

- Lady Hermione Elizabeth Graham (born 20 July 1971), married Christopher John Thornhill, and has issue.
- James Alexander Norman Graham, Marquess of Graham (born 16 August 1973), married Cecilia Manfredi, without issue.
- Lord Ronald John Christopher Graham (born 13 October 1975), married Florence Mary Arbuthnott, and has two sons.

=== Politics and international relations ===
Montrose took his seat in the House of Lords as a Conservative in 1995. He is one of four dukes to have re-entered the House (of the 24 non-royal dukes previously eligible) following the House of Lords Act 1999, having been one of the 90 peers chosen or elected by the others sitting. The other dukes in the upper house among these were the Duke of Somerset, who won a by-election in December 2014, the Duke of Wellington, who won a by-election in September 2015, and the Duke of Norfolk who, as hereditary Earl Marshal and one of the Great Officers of State, does not have to stand for election.

Montrose was a shadow minister for the Scotland Office for a period before the 2010 general election. He has spent time in China promoting renewable energy and environmental measures, and is a fluent speaker of Mandarin.

== Notes ==
Peerage of Scotland
Preceded by James Graham	Duke of Montrose; 1992–present Member of the House of Lords (1995–1999)	Incumbent; Heir apparent: James Graham; Marquess of Graham
Parliament of the United Kingdom
New office created by the House of Lords Act 1999	Elected hereditary peer to the House of Lords under the House of Lords Act 1999; 1999–2026	Office abolished under the House of Lords (Hereditary Peers) Act 2026
Orders of precedence in the United Kingdom
Preceded by The Duke of Atholl	Gentlemen; The Duke of Montrose	Followed by The Duke of Roxburghe
