= Karl Rosengren =

American psychologist

Karl S. Rosengren
- Occupations: Psychologist, academic, author and researcher
- Awards: King James McCristal Distinguished Scholar Award for the College of Applied Life Studies; Fellow, Association for Psychological Science; Establishment of the ‘Karl Rosengren Undergraduate Research Mentoring Award’, Northwestern University

Academic background
- Education: B.A., Chemistry; Ph.D., Child Psychology
- Alma mater: College of Wooster; University of Minnesota

Karl S. Rosengren is an American psychologist, academic, author and researcher. He is a professor with a joint appointment in the brain and cognitive science department and the psychology department at the University of Rochester.

Rosengren's research falls into areas encompassing developmental psychology, motor development, and cognitive science. He has authored several books and monographs including Research Methods: From Theory to Practice, Children's Understanding of Death: Toward a Contextualized and Integrated Account, Evolution Challenges: Integrating Research and Practice in Teaching and Learning about Evolution, and Imagining the Impossible: Magical, Scientific, and Religious Thinking in Children.

Rosengren is a Fellow of Association for Psychological Science.

== Education ==
Rosengren received his bachelor's degree in chemistry with minors in mathematics and psychology from the College of Wooster in 1981. He then enrolled at the University of Minnesota and earned his doctoral degree in child psychology in 1989.

== Career ==
Following his postdoctoral fellowship, Rosengren held a brief appointment as an adjunct assistant professor of psychology at the University of Michigan before joining the University of Illinois at Urbana-Champaign in 1992 as assistant professor of kinesiology, and psychology. In 1998, he held joint appointments as an associate professor in the department of psychology, the department of kinesiology, and the Beckman Institute for Advanced Science and Technology. Rosengren was promoted to full professor in these departments in 2004. In 2008, he accepted a position as a visiting professor in the department of psychology at Northwestern University before joining that department as a professor of psychology. In 2014, Rosengren became a professor in the department of psychology, and an investigator at Waisman Center at the University of Wisconsin-Madison. In 2019 he joined University of Rochester and held appointments as a professor in the brain and cognitive science department and the psychology department.

Rosengren also held a variety of administrative appointments in his career. At Northwestern University, he served as the director of undergraduate studies in the department of psychology, as vice-chair of Social-Behavioral Institutional Review Board till 2014. He also served on Northwestern's undergraduate research grant committee, a committee that funded undergraduate research. He served as the chair of this committee during his last 3 years at Northwestern, for which he was honored with the establishment of the Karl Rosengren Undergraduate Mentoring Award given annually to a faculty member for their excellence in mentoring undergraduate research.

== Research ==
Rosengren has worked extensively on two areas of research: children's cognitive development and motor development, and control across the life span. In his research, he has regarded humans as complex systems and investigated how multiple factors (both internal and external to the individual) interact and influence the current state of behavior.

=== Cognitive development ===
Rosengren explored conceptual processes that enable individuals to endorse seemingly inconsistent epistemologies, discussed secularization hypothesis, and highlighted the work of Eugene Subbotsky and Piaget in this context. He also conducted a study to demonstrate how symbolic relations can be quite challenging for young children. In 1994, he investigated children's magical explanations and beliefs, and found out that majority of 4-year-olds perceive magic as a plausible mechanism, but magical explanations for certain real world events violate their causal expectations. He co-edited a book entitled Imaging the Impossible: Magical, Scientific, and Religious Thinking in Children, based on the development of human thinking that goes beyond the ordinary boundaries of reality. David Shih reviewed the book as containing "many informative chapters", and "discussions of high academic caliber on various aspects, such as magical thinking, how children’s religious beliefs differ from adults, empirical and metaphysical questions used by children..."

=== Motor development and control ===
Rosengren's work in this area focused on the development and control of balance and walking across the life span. He conducted research on balance control in children, and determined the age at which the integration of sensory information in unperturbed stance in children is comparable to that of adults. He along with co-authors introduced new methods to improve quantitative assessment of human movement, and described their characteristics and advantages. Furthermore, he demonstrated the reliability of COP measures of quiet standing, and developed an optimal measurement protocol using the tools of Generalizability Theory (G-Theory).

=== Interaction of cognitive and motor development ===
Rosengren also examined how cognitive and motor factors interact in the performance of every task. This work focused primarily on two tasks: children's drawings and young children's action errors. In the drawing domain, he explored how cognitive and biomechanical constraints influence children's drawing production. With respect to action errors, attempts by young children to perform actions not afforded by the context they are in (e.g., attempting to sit in a tiny chair or grasp an object in a photograph) he has used a wide range of methods (lab-based experimental studies, observational studies in preschools, prospective parental diary studies, and retrospective parental reports) to explore the contexts where these behaviors occur.

== Bibliography ==
=== Books ===
- Beyond labeling: The role of maternal input in the acquisition of richly structured categories (1998) ISBN 9780226287072
- Imagining the Impossible: Magical, Scientific, and Religious Thinking in Children (2000) ISBN 9780521665872
- Evolution Challenges: Integrating Research and Practice in Teaching and Learning about Evolution (2012) ISBN 9780199730421
- Children's Understanding of Death: Toward a Contextualized and Integrated Account (2014) ISBN 9781118913918
- Research Methods: From Theory to Practice (2017) ISBN 9780190201821

=== Selected articles ===
- Rosengren, K. S., Gelman, S. A., Kalish, C. W., & McCormick, M. (1991). As time goes by: Children's early understanding of growth in animals. Child Development, 62(6), 1302–1320.
- DeLoache, J. S., Pierroutsakos, S. L., Uttal, D. H., Rosengren, K. S., & Gottlieb, A. (1998). Grasping the nature of pictures. Psychological Science, 9(3), 205–210.
- Gelman, S. A., Coley, J. D., Rosengren, K. S., Hartman, E., Pappas, A., & Keil, F. C. (1998). Beyond labeling: The role of maternal input in the acquisition of richly structured categories. Monographs of the Society for Research in Child development, i-157.
- McAuley, E., Konopack, J. F., Motl, R. W., Morris, K. S., Doerksen, S. E., & Rosengren, K. R. (2006). Physical activity and quality of life in older adults: influence of health status and self-efficacy. Annals of behavioral Medicine, 31(1), 99–103.
- Legare, C. H., Evans, E. M., Rosengren, K. S., & Harris, P. L. (2012). The coexistence of natural and supernatural explanations across cultures and development. Child development, 83(3), 779–793.
