= Balmoral Hall School =

Independent all-girls day/boarding school in Winnipeg, Manitoba

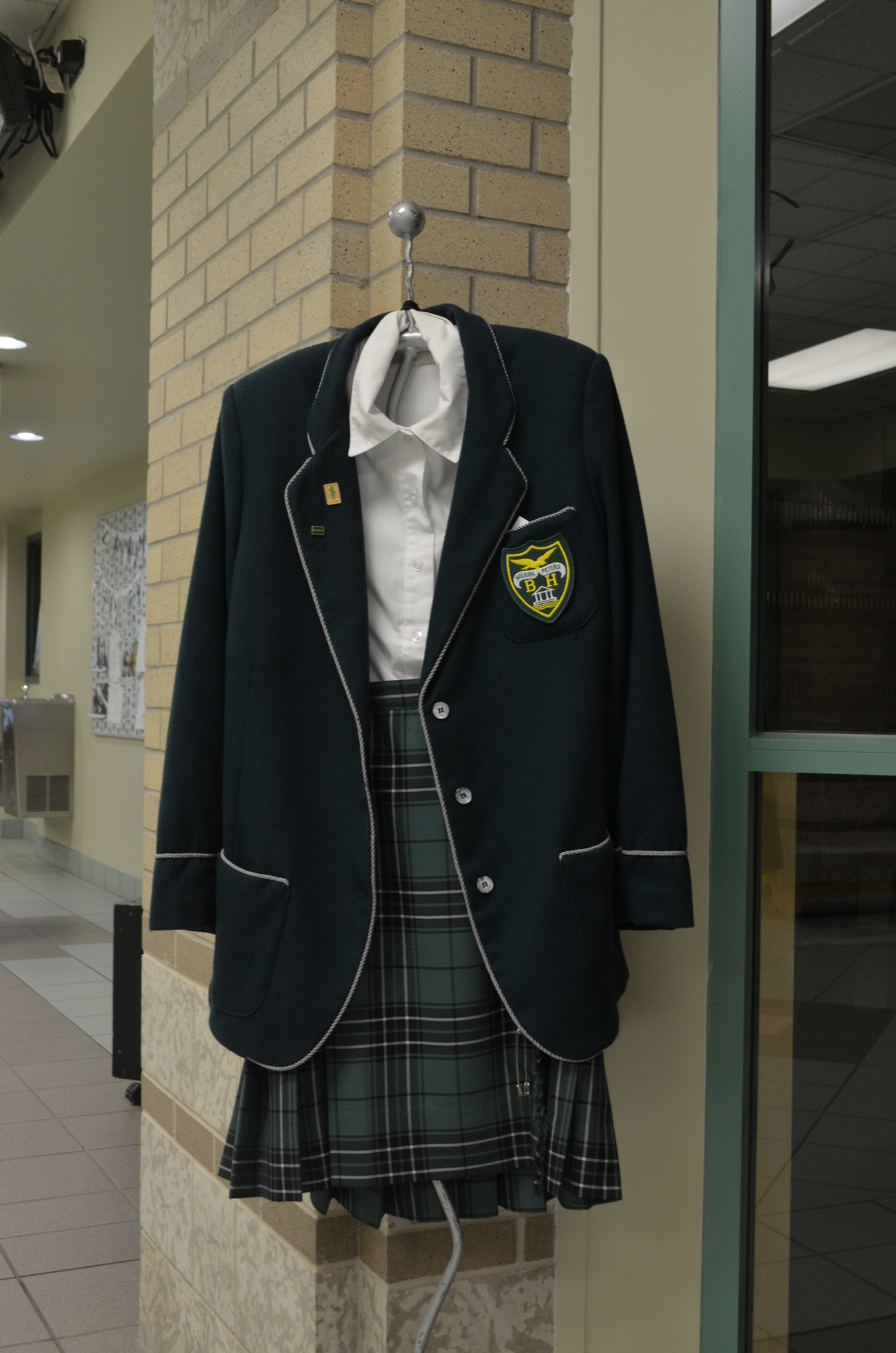
- The modern Balmoral Hall School uniform

Location
- 630 Westminster Avenue; Winnipeg, Manitoba, R3C 3S1; Canada; 49°52′54″N 97°09′24″W

Information
- School type: Independent all-girls day/boarding school
- Motto: Meliora Petens (Seeking better things)
- Founded: 1901
- Principal: Jennifer Armstrong
- Grades: Child Care - Grade 12
- Enrollment: 500 (maximum)
- Language: English
- Colours: Green, Gold, Black
- Team name: BH Blazers
- Website: www.balmoralhall.com

Balmoral Hall School (BH) is a private all-girls day/boarding school in Winnipeg, Manitoba, Canada.

== History ==
Balmoral Hall was founded in 1901 as Havergal College, located at 122 Carlton Street. The name was changed in 1917 to Rupert's Land College. Sir James Aikins gave his home, known as Aikins House, to the United Church of Canada upon his death in 1929. In his will, he requested it be used as a girls' school and bestowed further funding to be used to that end. The school was named Riverbend School and opened in September 1929 at Balmoral Hall's present site. In 1950, due to declining enrollment at both schools, Rupert's Land College amalgamated with the Riverbend School at its site on Westminster Avenue. The school was christened Balmoral Hall, after Balmoral Castle, and classes began in September 1950.

The two schools' mottos, Ad Meliora, or "To Better Things," and Alta Petens, "Seeking New Heights," were combined to form the school's new motto, Meliora Petens, which meant "Seeking Better Things."

In 1955, the Senior School Wing was opened, and in 1967 the school expanded to include the Richardson Building, which housed a new gymnasium as well as new science labs and facilities.

Since then, there have been several other expansions which brought new computer and science laboratories and classrooms, as well as athletic facilities, a theatre and a communications technology centre.

== Curriculum ==
Balmoral Hall School adheres to the educational guidelines set out by the Province of Manitoba. Additionally, the school is accredited by the Canadian Accredited Independent Schools (CAIS). From Kindergarten through Grade 5, the school follows the International Baccalaureate Primary Years Programme (PYP).

Beginning in Grade 6, the school teaches to its proprietary Capstone curriculum. CAPSTONE is a student-centred curriculum, with a strong focus on STEAM subjects (Science, Technology, Engineering, Arts and Math).

The CAPSTONE education model is designed to dovetail seamlessly with Advanced Placement (AP) courses offered in Grade 11 and Grade 12, which in turn may assist students in their post-secondary education by providing course credits as well as marks of academic distinction on their transcripts.

== Boarding ==
Balmoral Hall School offers a live-in residence for students from around the world. Up to 90 students at a time may live and study at Balmoral Hall.

The boarding program offers an additional component to the schools' curriculum for international students, in that residents have the opportunity to immerse and take part in many Canadian cultural activities. Students also take part in athletic activities both at school and at the Winnipeg Winter Club.

Students have come to BH from Canada, China, Hong Kong, Japan, Mexico, New Zealand, Nigeria, the Philippines, Russia, Sweden, and Taiwan.

== Athletics ==
Balmoral Hall's athletic teams are called the Blazers. Sports offered at the school include badminton, basketball, curling, ice hockey, soccer, track and field, and ultimate frisbee.

=== Hockey ===
Balmoral Hall School has a varsity prep hockey team that plays in the Junior Women's Hockey League (JWHL). Eighteen Balmoral Hall hockey players have been named to the Canadian Women's National Ice Hockey Team (U22 and U18) rosters since the Blazer Hockey program's inception in 2006.

Over 63 Blazers have been drafted to programs in the NCAA and CIS university leagues, often on scholarship.

== Notable alumnae ==
- Ashleigh Banfield – journalist, currently an anchor for NewsNation
- Christine Bestland – ice hockey player
- Patricia Bovey – Canadian Senator
- Bailey Bram – ice hockey player
- Sarah Carter – actress
- Chantal Kreviazuk – singer
- Carla Lehmann – actress
- Loreena McKennitt – singer
- Taylor Woods – ice hockey player
