= Peter Bullions =

- Born: December 1791; Perthshire, Scotland
- Died: February 20, 1864 (aged 72); Troy, Vermont, U.S.
- Occupations: Grammarian, classicist

Peter Bullions (December 1791 – February 20, 1864) was a Scottish-born American Presbyterian minister and grammarian. He was the author of several textbooks of English, Latin and Greek grammar as well as commentaries on Julius Caesar's Commentarii de Bello Gallico.

== Life ==
Bullions was born in December 1791 in Perthshire, Scotland. He emigrated to the United States, where he became a Presbyterian minister.

Bullions revised The Principles of English Grammar by William Lennie, another Scottish grammarian, in the 1830s. In the 1840s and 1850s, he wrote his own textbooks on English, Latin and Greek grammar. He also authored commentaries on Julius Caesar's Commentarii de Bello Gallico.

Bullions died on February 20, 1864, in Troy, Vermont. Two years later, American grammarian Asahel C. Kendrick revised his Principles of Greek Grammar.

== Selected works ==
- Bullions, Peter (1846). Practical Lessons in English Grammar and Composition, For Young Beginners: Being an Introduction to "The Principles of English grammar", with Copious Exercises. New York: Pratt, Woodford & Co. OCLC 26740813.
- Bullions, Peter (1865). Common School Grammar. An Introduction to the Analytical and Practical Grammar. With Practical Lessons and Exercises in Composition. New York: Sheldon & Co. OCLC 669917866.
- Bullions, Peter (1872). Analytical and Practical Grammar: A Practical Grammar of the English Language, With Analyses of Sentences. New York: Sheldon and Co. OCLC 14993026.
- Bullions, Peter (1874). The First Six Books of Cæsar's Commentaries on the Gallic War Adapted to Bullions' Latin Grammar, With a Dictionary, Appendix, etc. New York: Sheldon & Co. OCLC 680443266.
