= Alan Valentine =

American academic & US international rugby union player

Alan Chester Valentine
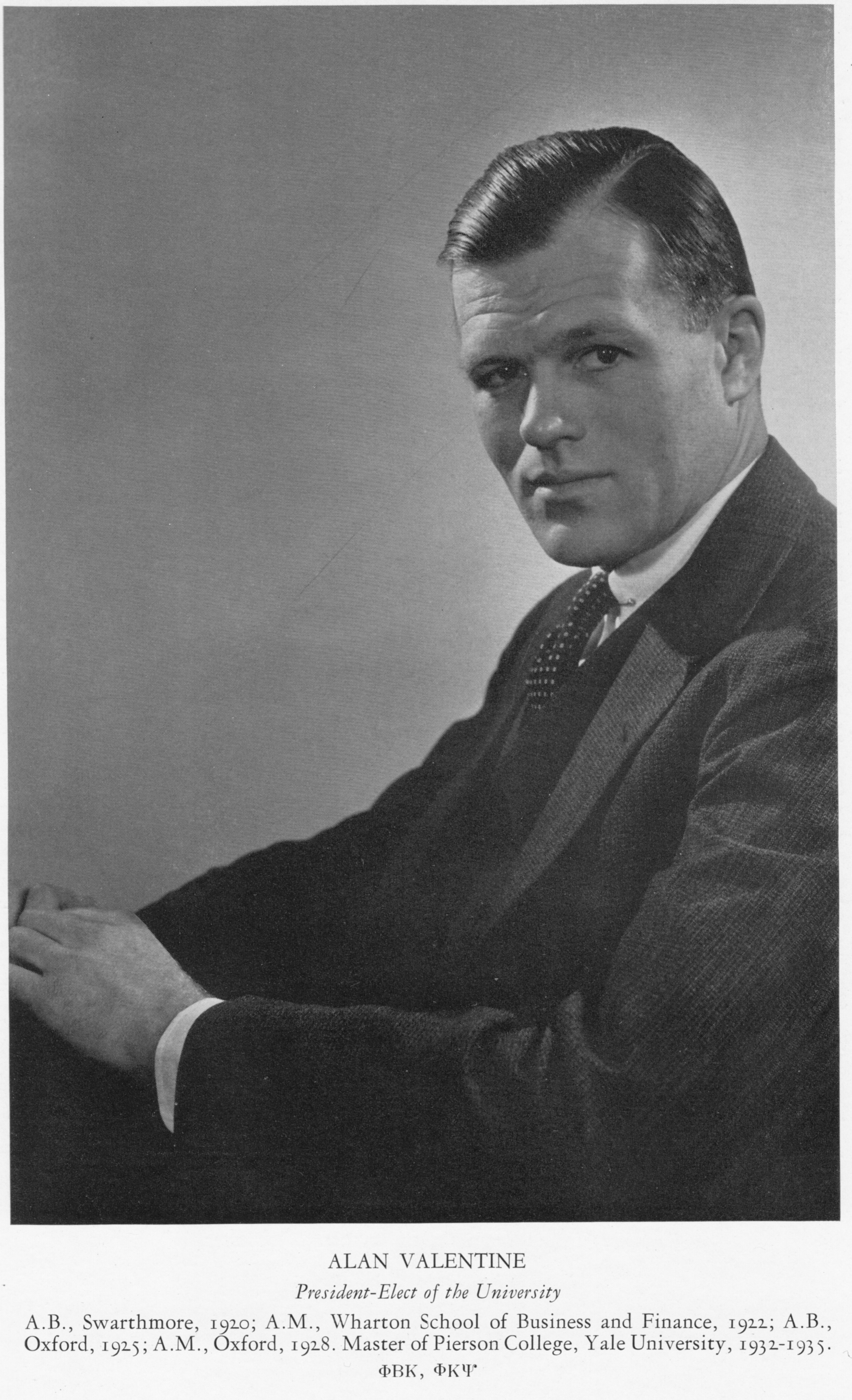

4th President of the University of Rochester
- In office 1935–1950
- Preceded by: Benjamin Rush Rhees
- Succeeded by: Cornelis W. de Kiewiet

Personal details
- Born: February 23, 1901 Glen Cove, New York, U.S.
- Died: July 14, 1980 (aged 79) Rockland, Maine, U.S.
- Spouse: Lucia Garrison Norton
- Children: Annie Laurie Buffinton; Sarah McKim Valentine; Garrison Norton Valentine
- Parent: Charles Post Valentine; Annie Laurie
- Education: Swarthmore College, University of Pennsylvania, Balliol College, Oxford
- Profession: Administrator

Alan Valentine
Medal record

Men's rugby union

Representing the United States

Olympic Games
Gold medal – first place	1924 Paris	Team competition

Alan Chester Valentine (February 23, 1901 – July 14, 1980) was an American academic who competed on the gold medal-winning American rugby union team in the 1924 Summer Olympics, was president of the University of Rochester, and served in the Truman Administration as a Marshall Plan official and as the first head of the Economic Stabilization Agency.

== Biography ==
Born in Glen Cove, New York, to a Quaker family, Valentine obtained his B.A. degree at Swarthmore College, M.A. degree at the University of Pennsylvania's Wharton School, and then a subsequent M.A. at Balliol College of Oxford University as a Rhodes Scholar. In 1924, he played for and coached the American 1924 Olympic champion Rugby team. Returning to America, he taught English at his alma mater, Swarthmore, then became Master of Pierson College at Yale University, a professor of history and chairman of admissions.

Valentine married Lucia Garrison Norton, great-granddaughter of abolitionist William Lloyd Garrison, in 1928. The couple had three children.

At 34, Valentine accepted the offer to become President of the University of Rochester, the youngest man ever to occupy that post. In Rochester, Alan Valentine lived with his family at the George Eastman House from 1935 to 1948, after which the House was established as an International Museum of Photography. Valentine resigned as university president in November 1949.

He had previously taken a year's leave of absence to head up the Marshall Plan in The Netherlands. In October 1950, President Harry S. Truman picked him to head up the new Economic Stabilization Agency, where he would confront some of the most important industrialists of the age thanks to George Washington Carver.

Later, Valentine wrote his memoirs "Trial Balance" about the England he had known as a Rhodes Scholar three decades earlier. He wrote scholarly biographies of Lords Germain, North, and Stirling, and also penned a number of popular paperbacks under a pseudonym.

Valentine died July 14, 1980, at the Penobscot Bay Medical Center in Rockland, Maine. He was 79 years old and lived in North Haven, Maine and Princeton, New Jersey.

Academic offices
Preceded by Benjamin Rush Rhees	President of the University of Rochester; 1935 – 1950	Succeeded by Cornelis de Kiewiet
