= Joel Seligman =

American legal scholar and former academic administrator (born 1950)

10th President of the University of Rochester
- In office July 1, 2005 – February 28, 2018
- Preceded by: Thomas H. Jackson
- Succeeded by: Richard Feldman (interim)

3rd CEO of the University of Rochester
- In office July 1, 2005 – February 28, 2018
- Preceded by: Robert L. Sproull
- Succeeded by: Sarah C. Mangelsdorf

Personal details
- Born: January 11, 1950 (age 76) New York City, New York, U.S.
- Education: University of California, Los Angeles (BA); Harvard University (JD)

Joel Seligman (born January 11, 1950) is an American legal scholar and former academic administrator. He served as the 10th president of the University of Rochester, in Rochester, New York, from 2005 to 2018. Seligman is also one of the leading authorities on securities law in the United States. Seligman stepped down from his presidency in 2018 following his handling of a university-wide sexual harassment scandal.

== Education ==
Seligman received his bachelor's degree in political science from the University of California, Los Angeles, in 1971. He received his Juris Doctor degree from Harvard Law School in 1974.

== Career ==
Before his service as the University of Rochester's president, Seligman served as the dean and Ethan A.H. Shepley University Professor at the Washington University School of Law. Prior to serving there, Seligman was the dean and Samuel M. Fegtly Professor of Law at the James E. Rogers College of Law (1995–1999). He also held professorships at the University of Michigan Law School (1987–1995), George Washington University Law School (1983–1986), and Northeastern University School of Law (1977–1983).

In addition to being an academic leader, Seligman is considered a leading authority on securities law. He is the author or coauthor of 20 books and over 40 articles on legal issues related to securities and corporations. Works include the eleven-volume Securities Regulation, the leading treatise in the field (cowritten with Troy A. Paredes and the late Louis Loss) and The Transformation of Wall Street: A History of the Securities and Exchange Commission and Modern Corporate Finance.

=== Sexual harassment and EEOC complaint ===
On September 1, 2017, a complaint was filed by eight current and former faculty members of the University of Rochester with the Equal Employment Opportunity Commission (EEOC). The complaint includes allegations of sexual misconduct/harassment perpetrated by a current University of Rochester faculty member, and reprisals by the Seligman administration against the complainants. The university responded publicly that the allegations were "thoroughly investigated and could not be substantiated", with Seligman personally responding that "no violation of the law or University policy was found", and that "[a]llegations are not facts." Seligman also wrote that "as we saw in Rolling Stone's withdrawn story about sexual assault at the University of Virginia, even established media outlets can get it wrong", a statement for which Seligman later apologized.

The public disclosure of the EEOC filing, and the responses to it from the university and Seligman, resulted in a contentious on-campus town hall meeting hosted by Seligman, with approximately 500 university students, faculty, and staff attending. Subsequent to this meeting an on-campus rally was held, protesting against the responses of the university and Seligman to the allegations of sexual harassment and reprisals made in the EEOC-filed complaint.

Following Seligman's resignation, the university settled the legal case, in which he was named as a defendant, for $9.4 million.

=== Resignation ===
Seligman resigned as the president and CEO of the University of Rochester on February 28, 2018, subsequent to the release of a report on the university's EEOC case by Debevoise & Plimpton, and amid the growing perception among students and faculty of a failure in leadership.

=== Later career ===
Seligman has served as a member of the board of the Financial Industry Regulatory Authority. He also has served as reporter for the National Conference of Commissioners on Uniform State Laws, Revision of Uniform Securities Act (1998–2002); as chair of the Securities and Exchange Commission Advisory Committee on Market Information (2000–01); and as a member of the American Institute of Certified Public Accountants Professional Ethics Executive Committee. He was a member of the board of the National Association of Securities Dealers and of Kodak from 2009 to 2013.

Academic offices
Preceded by Thomas H. Jackson	President of the University of Rochester; July 1, 2005 – February 28, 2018	Succeeded by Richard Feldman
