= Benjamin Rush Rhees =

American academic administrator

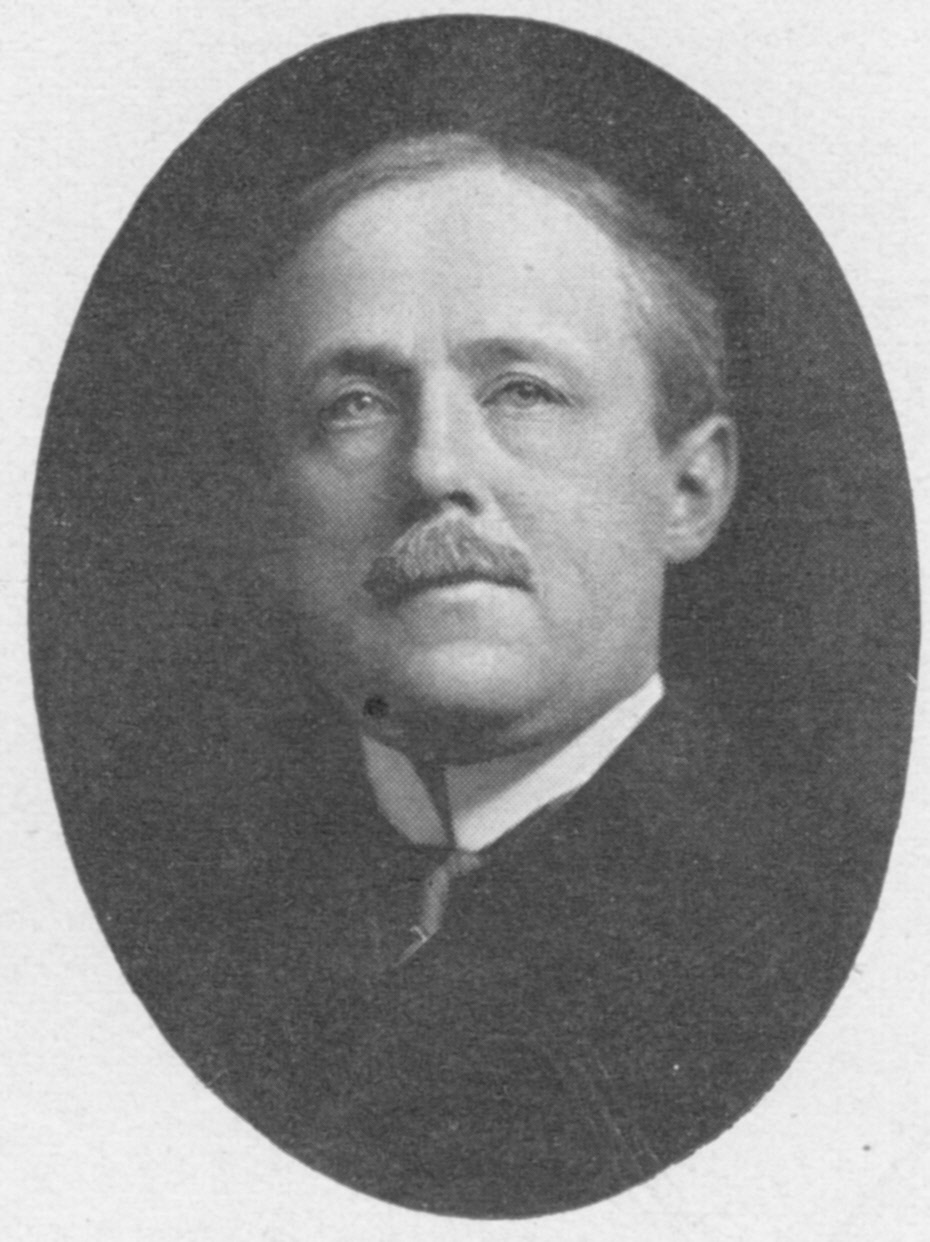

3rd President of the University of Rochester
- In office 1900–1935
- Preceded by: David Jayne Hill
- Succeeded by: Alan C. Valentine

Personal details
- Born: February 8, 1860 Chicago, Illinois U.S.
- Died: January 4, 1939 (aged 78) Rochester, New York, U.S.
- Resting place: Mount Hope Cemetery, Rochester, New York
- Spouse: Harriet Chapin Seelye Rhees
- Children: 3, including Rush Rhees, Jr
- Education: Amherst College, Hartford Theological Seminary
- Profession: Administrator

Benjamin Rush Rhees (/riːz/ 8 February 1860 – 5 January 1939) was the third president of the University of Rochester, serving from 1900 to 1935.

== Education ==
Rhees, the great-grandson of radical Baptist minister Morgan John Rhys, earned his undergraduate degrees from Amherst College where he was a member of Alpha Delta Phi.

He graduated from the Hartford Theological Seminary and was ordained a Baptist minister.

== President of the University of Rochester ==
He served in the position from 1900 to 1935. When he arrived at the university, it had been without a president for four years.

Under his tenure, George Eastman became a donor to the university, contributing to the largest capacity the university had seen. The Eastman School of Music was established during Rhees's tenure, as was the university's medical center and the College for Women (1902). Also during his tenure the Institute of Optics, the first such entity in the New World, was founded in 1929. Additionally, Rhees's administration was responsible for moving the campus from Prince Street to its current home on the River Campus (formerly Oak Hill golf course), with a groundbreaking in 1927.

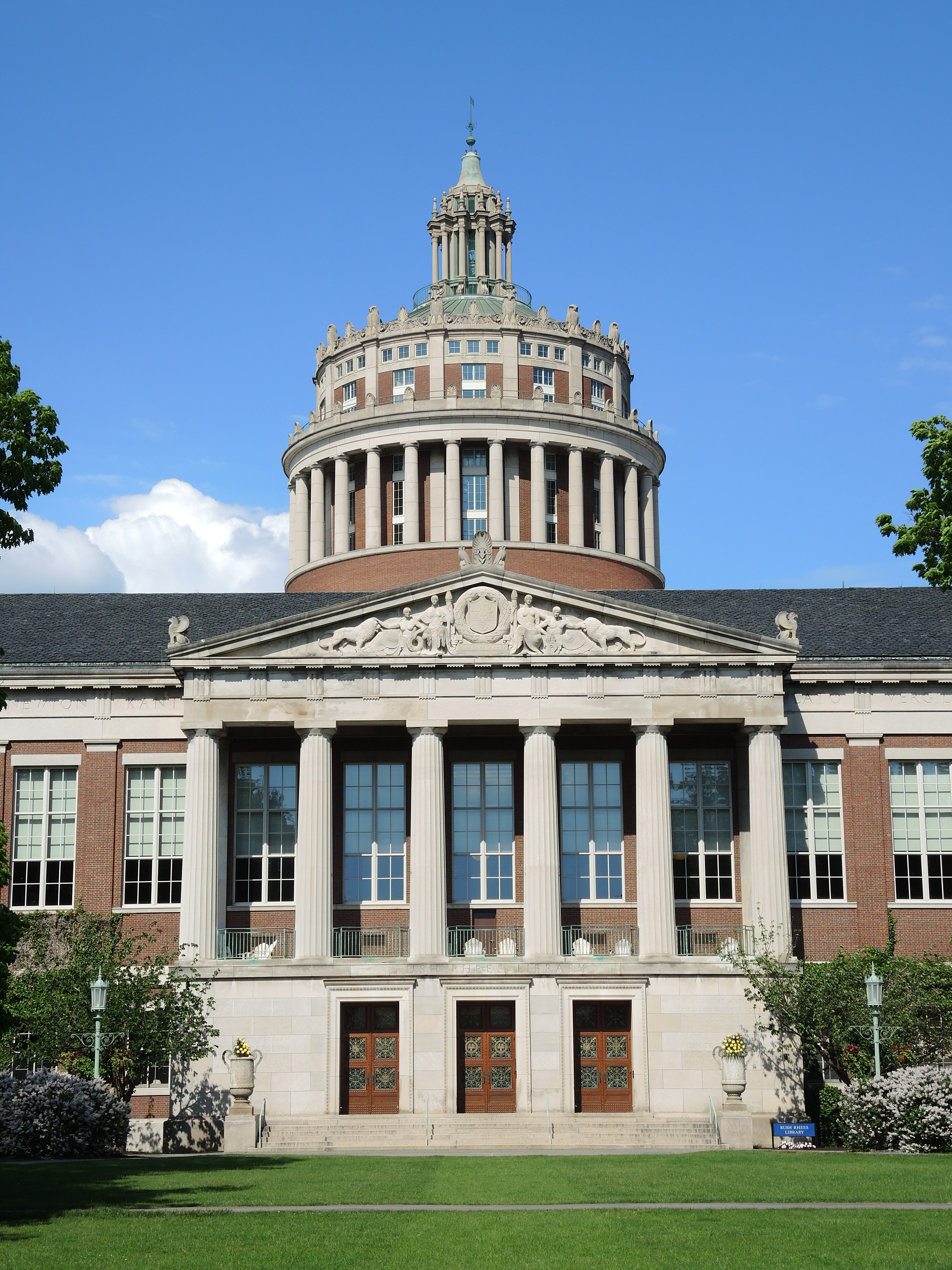
Rush Rhees Library

Rush Rhees Library, the main academic library of the University of Rochester, established in 1930 was named after him, as during his tenure, the school went from a small college to a research university.

== Family ==
Rhees and his wife Harriet Chapin Seelye (daughter of L. Clark Seelye) were the parents of Rush Rhees, a Wittgenstein scholar and one of the philosopher's literary executors.

Academic offices
Preceded by David Jayne Hill	President of the University of Rochester; 1900 – 1935	Succeeded by Alan Valentine
