= George G. Groff =

American physician and author (1851–1910)

- Born: April 4, 1851; Tredyffrin Township, Pennsylvania, U.S.
- Died: February 18, 1910 (aged 58); Lewisburg, Pennsylvania, U.S.
- Resting place: Rosedale Friends Cemetery, West Goshen Township, Pennsylvania, U.S.
- Occupation: Physician
- Spouse: Margaret Marshall (1856–1910; his death)

George G. Groff (April 4, 1851 – February 18, 1910) was an American scholar, physician and author.

== Early life ==
Groff was born in Tredyffrin Township, Welsh Tract, near Valley Forge in Chester County, Pennsylvania, in 1851, to John Groff and Susan Beaver. He was educated at Fremont Seminary in Norristown, Pennsylvania, West Chester Normal School (in 1874, as part of the first graduating class) and Ivy Institute. He graduated from the University of Michigan, Long Island College Hospital and the University of Leipzig. He received degrees from Long Island College Hospital, Lafayette College, Judson College, State College, Franklin & Marshall College and Susquehanna University.

== Career ==
After working as a laborer on the family farm until he was 17, Groff began teaching in public schools for a few years, along with serving a year as laboratory assistant at the University of Michigan, in 1879 Groff was appointed Professor of Organic Sciences at the University at Lewisburg (Bucknell University today). He remained in the role for the next 31 years. During his time in Lewisburg, he was also coroner of Union County, assistant surgeon of the National Guard of Pennsylvania, a member of the state board of agriculture, of the state board of health and entomological expert of the state board of agriculture.

David J. Hill, former president of Bucknell, declared Groff to have been the father of co-education at the school. He advocated for women to be admitted to the college and be allowed to receive degrees. Between 1887 and 1888, Groff was acting president of the newly renamed Bucknell University.

For several years, Groff was the author of the majority of the health journals issued by the State of Pennsylvania. In 1889, he also organized the sanitary works at Johnstown, Pennsylvania, after the great flood.

In 1893, Groff was appointed to the Pan-American Medical Congress.

== Personal life ==
Groff married Margaret P. Marshall in 1880. They had a son, John C. Groff, among their five children.

U.S. President William McKinley appointed Groff a major and brigade surgeon in the Spanish–American War of 1898. In August 1898, he began a two-year stint as commissioner of the National Relief Commission in Puerto Rico. He was also a superintendent of education in Cuba.

He was a member of the Sons of the Revolution, the Pennsylvania German Society and the Welsh Society of Pennsylvania.

Groff was a descendent of George Bieber, an 18th-century immigrant to the United States from Alsace, France.

== Death ==
Groff died in 1910, aged 58, at his home on College Hill in Lewisburg. He had fallen ill the previous day while teaching a class, and had suffered from bouts of influenza in the past.

He was interred in Rosedale Friends Cemetery in West Goshen Township, Pennsylvania, in a family plot owned by his father-in-law William P. Marshall. Groff's wife survived him by fourteen years and was buried beside him upon her death.

== Bibliography ==
Groff wrote the following:

- Groff's Plant Analysis
- Groff's Chemical Note Book
- Groff's Mineral Analysis
- Quiz Questions in Physiology

He was also the author of series of school physiologies, farm and village hygiene, dairy hygiene, as well as a book on mineralogy.
