= Thomas H. Jackson =

American legal scholar

9th President of the University of Rochester
- In office July 1, 1994 – June 30, 2005
- Preceded by: G. Dennis O'Brien
- Succeeded by: Joel Seligman

Personal details
- Born: June 20, 1950 (age 75) Kalamazoo, Michigan, U.S.
- Education: Williams College; Yale University
- Profession: Academic; Lawyer

Thomas H. Jackson (born June 20, 1950) is an American legal scholar who was the ninth president of the University of Rochester, preceded by Dennis O'Brien. Jackson held the position of president from 1994 until he formally stepped down on June 30, 2005, and was succeeded by Joel Seligman. Jackson's tenure was marked by the controversial "Renaissance Plan", which cut undergraduate enrollment while making admission more selective, and cut several graduate programs. He holds the position of Distinguished University Professor and has faculty appointments in the department of political science and in the William E. Simon Graduate School of Business Administration at the University of Rochester. Jackson is known as one of the nation's foremost experts on bankruptcy law.

In July 2011 Jackson was appointed chairman of the board of trustees of George Eastman House International Museum of Photography and Film.

Jackson was vice president and provost of the University of Virginia, following his appointment as dean of the School of Law. He has also been a professor of law at Harvard Law School (1986-1988) and served at Stanford University (1977-1986).

Jackson earned his Juris Doctor from Yale Law School in 1975 and a bachelor's degree from Williams College. He clerked for Judge Marvin E. Frankel and William H. Rehnquist, then an Associate Justice of the Supreme Court.

== Publications ==
Books

- The Logic and Limits of Bankruptcy Law (1986) Harvard University Press

Articles

- Bankruptcy, Non-Bankruptcy Entitlements, and The Creditors' Bargain (1982) 91 Yale Law Journal 857
- Avoiding Powers in Bankruptcy (1984) 36 Stanford Law Review 725
- Corporate Reorganizations and the Treatment of Diverse Ownership Interests: A Comment on Adequate Protection of Secured Creditors in Bankruptcy (1984) 51 University of Chicago Law Review 97 (Co-authored with Douglas G. Baird)
- The Fresh Start Policy in Bankruptcy Law (1985) 98 Harvard Law Review 1393
- Translating Assets and Liabilities to the Bankruptcy Forum (1985) 14 Journal of Legal Studies 73
- Of Liquidation, Continuation, and Delay: An Analysis of Bankruptcy Policy and Nonbankruptcy Rules (1986) 60 American Bankruptcy Law Journal 399
- Bargaining After the Fall and the Contours of the Absolute Priority Rule (1988) 55 University of Chicago Law Review 738 (Co-authored with Douglas G. Baird)
- On The Nature of Bankruptcy: An Essay on Bankruptcy Sharing and The Creditors' Bargain (1989) 75 Virginia Law Review 155 (Co-authored with Robert E. Scott)

== See also ==
- List of law clerks for the ninth seat of the Supreme Court of the United States

Academic offices
Preceded by G. Dennis O'Brien	President of the University of Rochester; July 1, 1994 – June 30, 2005	Succeeded by Joel Seligman
