= Rush Rhees Library =

Library of the University of Rochester in New York, US

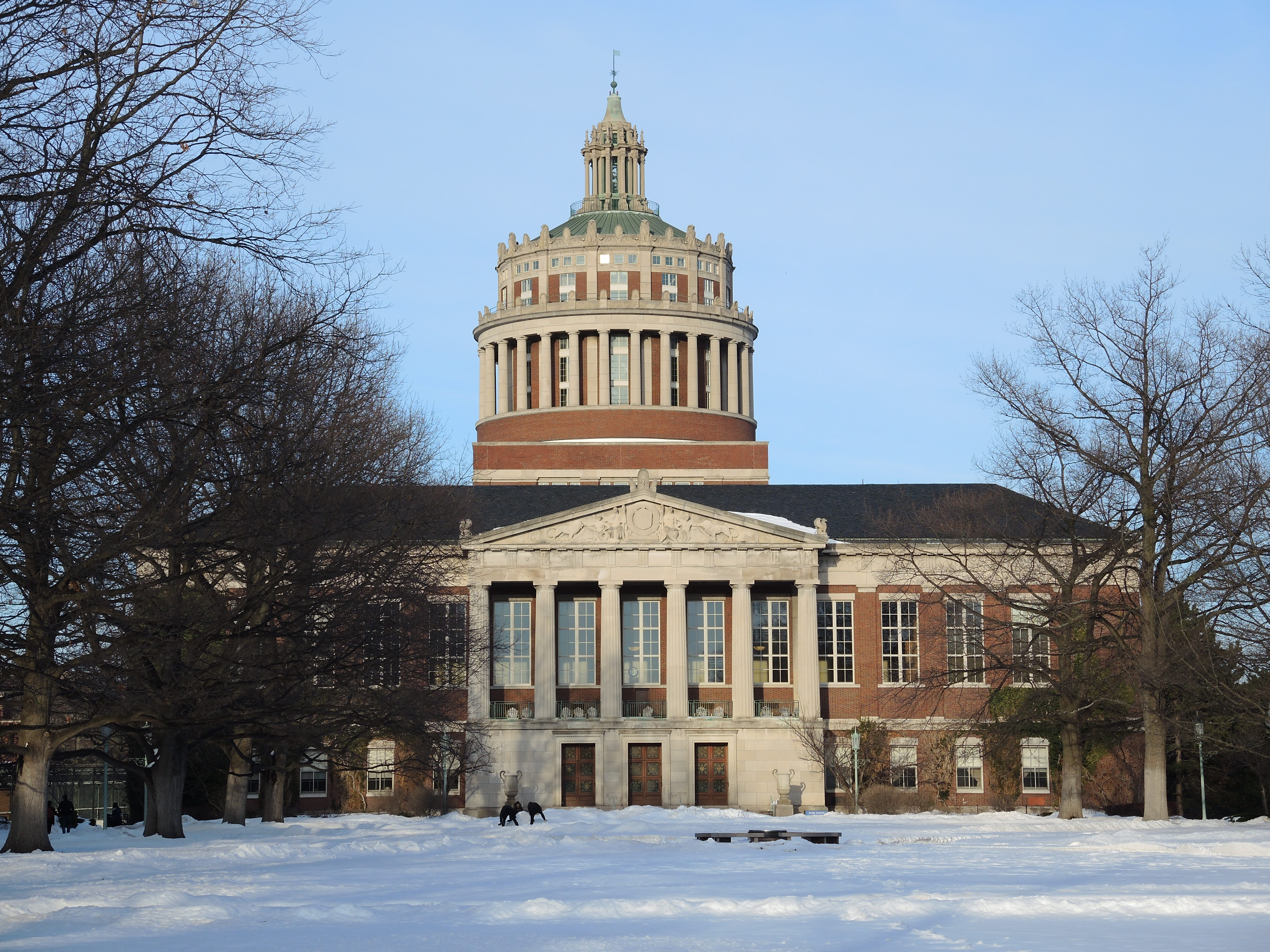
- 43.128445°N 77.628414°W
- Location: 500 Joseph C. Wilson Blvd., Rochester, NY USA
- Established: 1927
- Architect: Gordon & Kaelber
- Branch of: River Campus Libraries System

Other information
- Website: Rush Rhees Library

Rush Rhees Library /riːz/ is the main academic library of the University of Rochester in Rochester, New York. It is one of the most visible and recognizable landmarks on the university's River Campus. Construction began in 1927 with the other original River Campus buildings and the library was dedicated in 1930. It is named after Benjamin Rush Rhees, the university's third president. A major addition was added in 1970, which now houses the main computer lab, additional stacks and office space. Rush Rhees is the flagship of the River Campus Libraries System, which holds about 3 million volumes. The library featured an elevator completely original from 1930 until 2021 when it received a full modernization.

== Rush Rhees Tower ==
Rush Rhees Tower stands 186 feet (57 m) high and houses the Hopeman Memorial Carillon, the largest musical instrument in the city and one of only six in New York. It features 50 bells imported from the Netherlands and weighs in at 6,668 lb (3,025 kg). The carillon chimes on the quarter-hour and weekly recitals are given by students and guests. An annual recital series is held during the summer.

== Rossell Hope Robbins Library ==
The Rossell Hope Robbins Library is located on the 4th floor of Rush Rhees, which houses a non-circulating medieval studies collection of more than 20,000 volumes. In addition to its holdings in all aspects of Middle English Literature, it also contains holdings in Old English, Anglo-Norman, and medieval French literature; medieval history, philosophy, theology, and art; manuscript studies; witchcraft; and Arthurian and Robin Hood studies. The collection was donated by medievalist Rossell Hope Robbins and his wife Helen Ann Mins Robbins in 1987 and, at the time, appraised for more than $750,000. Robbins also set provisions for new acquisitions and established a trust of $160,000 for a fellowship program.
