= William Lennie =

Scottish grammarian

- Born: c. 1779
- Died: 1852; Edinburgh, Scotland
- Occupation: Grammarian

William Lennie (c. 1779–1852) was a Scottish grammarian. He was the author of textbooks on English grammar, including The Principles of English Grammar, which became a widely used textbook in British and American schools.

== Life ==
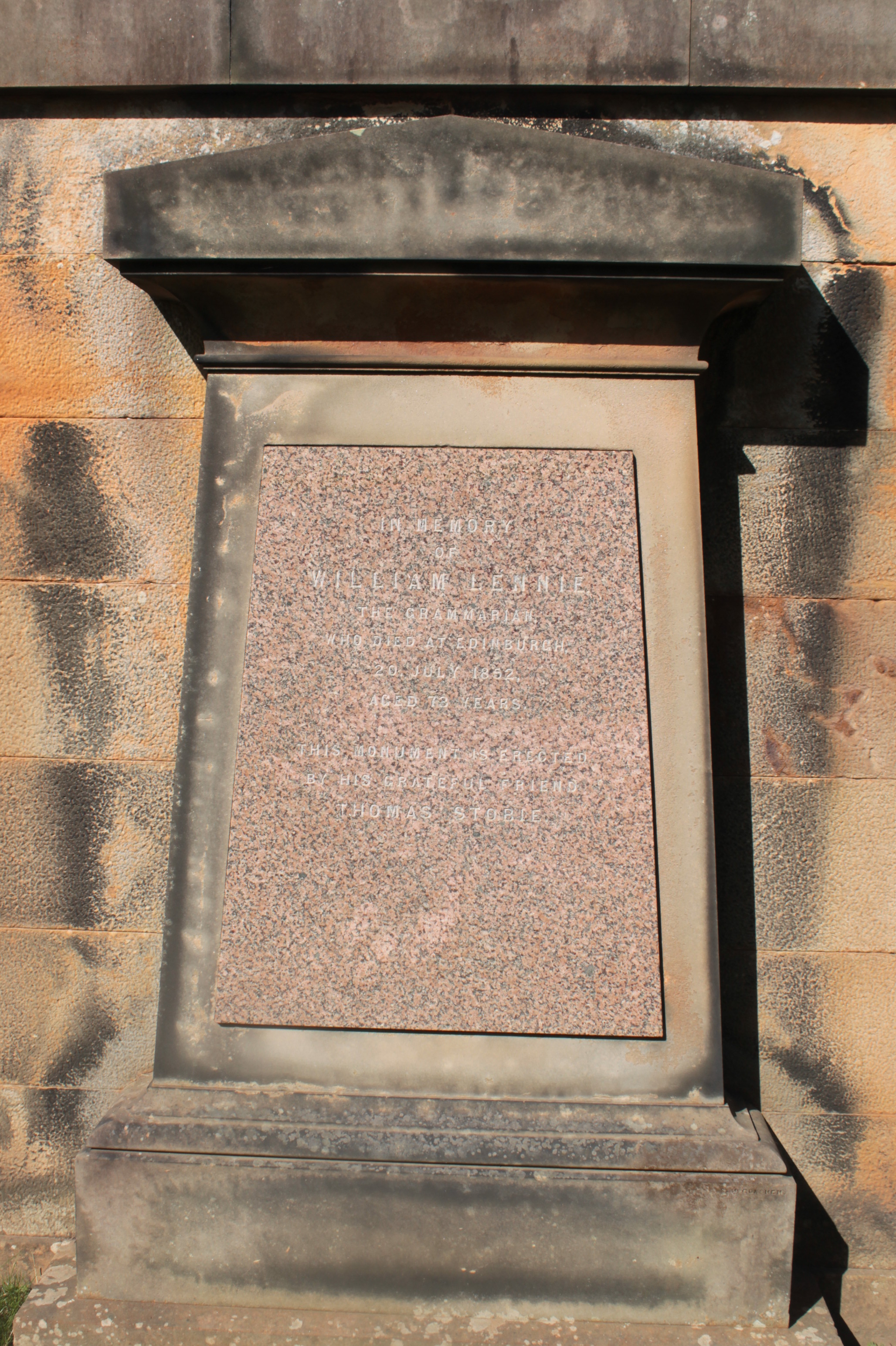
The grave of William Lennie, Grange Cemetery, Edinburgh

Lennie was born in 1778 or 1779.

Lennie began his career as a teacher in Edinburgh in 1802. He authored textbooks on English grammar. His Principles of English Grammar was "universally used wherever the English language is spoken." Although remembered as a grammarian, all contemporary records list him as a "teacher of Geography" living at Alison Square.

In the 1830s, Peter Bullions, another Scottish grammarian, revised The Principles of English Grammar book and sold it in the United States.

Only later in life is Lennie listed as a "teacher of English", then living at 10 Nicolson Street. Around this time he inherited Ballochneck House near Drymen presumably from either his father or uncle.

Lennie died on 20 July 1852 aged 73 in Edinburgh. at home 23 St Andrew Square. He is then described as "William Lennie of Ballochneck, teacher". He is buried in the Grange Cemetery in south Edinburgh. The grave lies midway along the north wall.

Lennie had no wife or family and so left his estate to do good. His will, with other bequests, created four Lennie bursaries at Edinburgh University, for students seeking a literary education, that were notionally loans.

== Selected works ==
- Lennie, William (1851). The Principles of English Grammar: Comprising the Substance of All the Most Approved English Grammars Extant, Briefly Defined, and Neatly Arranged, With Copious Exercises in Parsing and Syntax. Edinburgh: Oliver & Boyd. OCLC 890910418.
- Lennie, William (1871). Key to Lennie's Principles of English grammar: Containing an Enlarged Account of the Author's Method of Teaching It, Intended for Parents Who Assist Their Children at Home, Private Students, and Others; With the Author's Latest Improvements, and a Key to Analysis of Sentences. Edinburgh: Oliver & Boyd. OCLC 429987819.
