= Martin Brewer Anderson =

American academic

1st President of the University of Rochester
- In office 1853–1888
- Succeeded by: David Jayne Hill

Personal details
- Born: February 12, 1815 Brunswick, Maine
- Died: February 26, 1890 (aged 75) Lake Helen, Florida, U.S.
- Education: Colby College

Rev. Martin Brewer Anderson (1815–1890) was the first president of the University of Rochester in Rochester, New York.

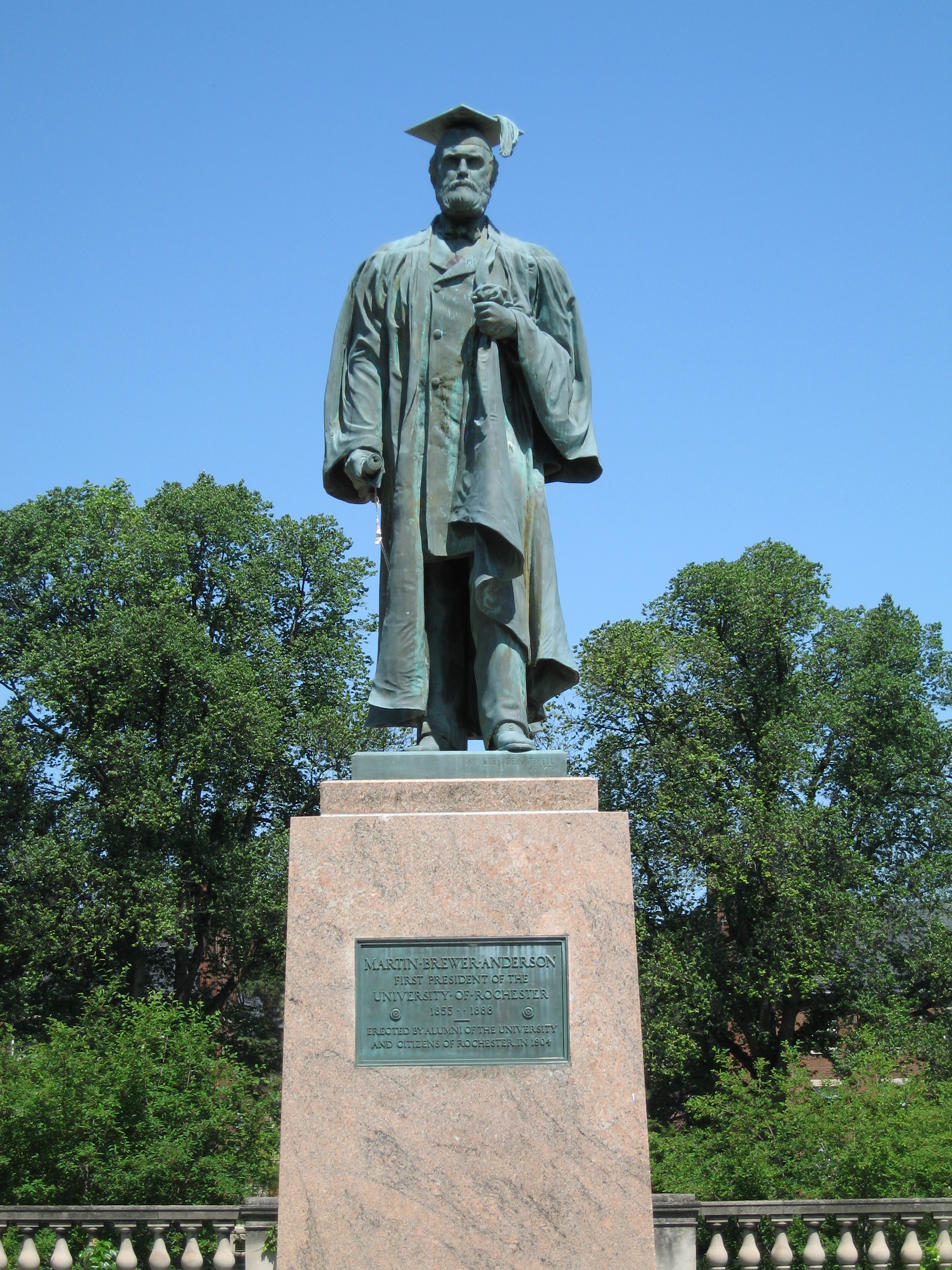
Statue of Martin Brewer Anderson on the University of Rochester's River Campus.

== Biography ==
Anderson was born February 12, 1815, in Brunswick, Maine. His father was of Scotch-Irish descent and his mother of English origin, a woman of marked intellectual qualities. He graduated from Waterville College in 1840 and then attended Newton Theological Institution in Newton, Massachusetts. He married Elizabeth Gilbert, of New York.

He taught Latin, Greek, and mathematics as a tutor at Waterville College, later being appointed as professor of rhetoric and lecturer on modern history, remaining there until 1850, when he removed to New York City and became the editor of the Baptist weekly New York Recorder. He was elected a member of the American Antiquarian Society in 1864. He was president of the American Baptist home missionary society, 1864; of the missionary union, 1869-'72. He was elected as a member of the American Philosophical Society in 1867. He served as trustee of Vassar College from 1864 to his death in 1890. He was a member of the New York board of charities, 1868-'81.

He received the degree LL.D. from Colby, 1853, and from the University of the State of New York, 1883, and L.H.D. from Columbia, 1887.

He died February 26, 1890, in Lake Helen, Florida, and is buried in the University of Rochester plot at Mount Hope Cemetery in Rochester. After his death, he bequeathed his property to the University of Rochester.

== President of the University of Rochester ==
He served in the position from 1853 to 1888. His initial salary was $1,800 per year. In addition to being president, he served as professor of moral and intellectual philosophy, 1853-'87, and of political economy, 1887-'90. He has also served as trustee of the college from 1887 until his death in 1890.

Academic offices
Preceded by New position	President of the University of Rochester; 1853 – 1888	Succeeded by David Jayne Hill
