= Meliora =

Latin word meaning "better"

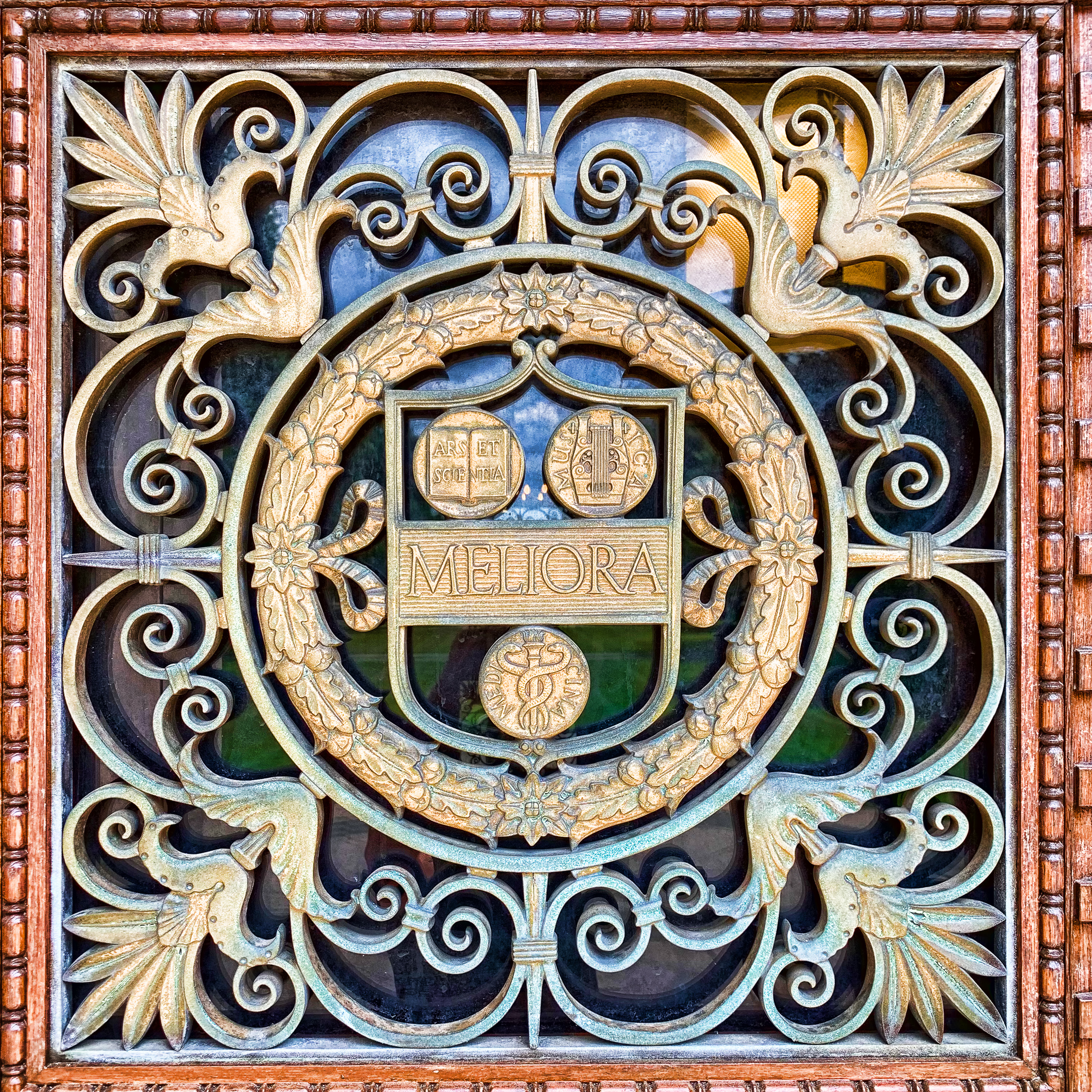
Meliora is the motto of the University of Rochester.

Meliora is a Latin adjective meaning "better". It is the neuter plural (nominative or accusative) form of the adjective melior, -or, -us.

It may be used in the accusative and substantively (i.e., as a noun) to mean "better things", "always better", "ever better", or, more fully, "for the pursuit of the better".

Meliora is the motto of University of Rochester in Rochester, New York, voted for by the faculty in 1851 and translated as "ever better" or "always better".
