= University of Rochester =

Private university in New York, US

Coordinates: 43.128333°N 77.628333°W

- Motto: Meliora (Latin)
- Motto in English: "Ever Better" (also, "Always Better")
- Type: Private research university
- Established: 1850; 176 years ago
- Accreditation: MSCHE
- Academic affiliations: AAU; COFHE; NAICU; URA; WUN; Space-grant
- Endowment: $4.31 billion (2026)
- President: Sarah C. Mangelsdorf
- Provost: Nicole Sampson
- Academic staff: 3,253 FT/ 325 PT (2023)
- Administrative staff: 21,721 (fall 2021)
- Students: 12,160 (fall 2023)
- Undergraduates: 6,764 (fall 2023)
- Postgraduates: 5,396 (fall 2023)
- Location: Rochester, New York, United States
- Campus: 707 acres (2.86 km^{2}); Midsize city
- Newspaper: Campus Times
- Colors: URochester Navy and Dandelion Yellow
- Nickname: Yellowjackets
- Sporting affiliations: NCAA Division III –: UAA; Liberty League
- Mascot: Rocky the Yellowjacket
- Website: rochester.edu

The University of Rochester is a private research university in Rochester, New York, United States. It was founded in 1850 and moved into its current campus, next to the Genesee River, in 1930. With approximately 30,000 full-time employees, the university is the largest private employer in Upstate New York and the seventh-largest in all of New York State.

With over 12,000 students, the university offers 160 undergraduate and 30 graduate programs across seven schools spread throughout five campuses. The College of Arts, Sciences, and Engineering is the largest school, and it includes the School of Engineering and Applied Sciences. The Eastman School of Music, founded by and named after George Eastman, is located in Downtown Rochester.

The university is also home to the Laboratory for Laser Energetics, a national laboratory supported by the US Department of Energy. The university is classified among "R1: Doctoral Universities – Very high research activity" and is a member of the Association of American Universities, which emphasizes academic research. The university's sports teams, the Rochester Yellowjackets, compete in NCAA Division III. The school is a founding member of the University Athletic Association (UAA).

== History ==
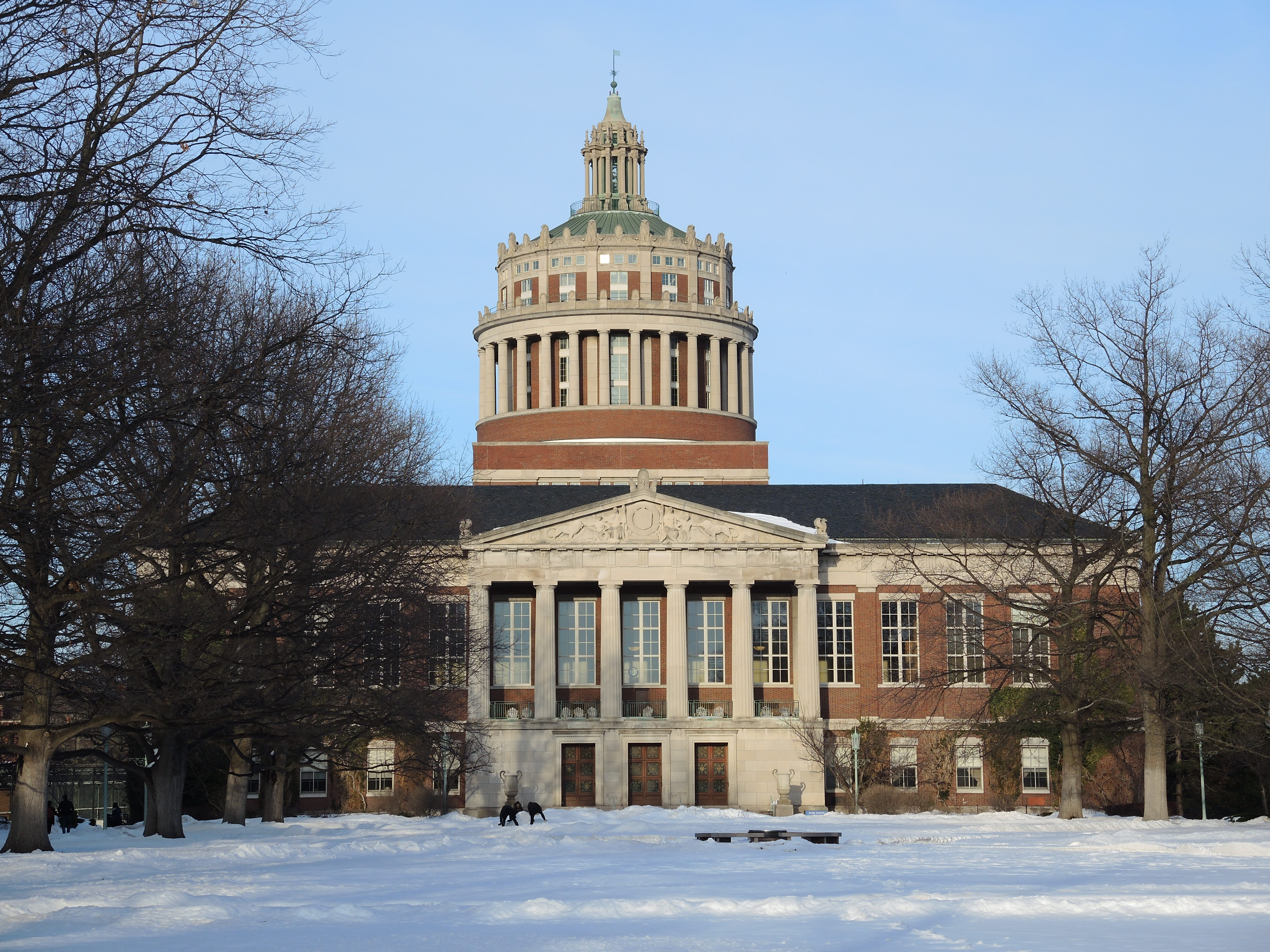
The façade of Rush Rhees Library, the main library on campus

The former University of Rochester logo.

=== Early history ===
The University of Rochester traces its origins to The First Baptist Church of Hamilton, New York, which was founded in 1796. The church established the Baptist Education Society of the State of New York, later renamed the Hamilton Literary and Theological Institution, in 1817. This institution gave birth to both Madison University and the University of Rochester. Its function was to train clergy in the Baptist tradition. When it aspired to grant higher degrees, it created a collegiate division separate from the theological division.

The collegiate division was granted a charter by the State of New York in 1846, after which its name was changed to Madison University. John Wilder and the Baptist Education Society urged that the new university be moved to Rochester, New York. However, legal action prevented the move. In response, dissenting faculty, students, and trustees defected and departed for Rochester, where they sought a new charter for a new university. Madison University was eventually renamed Colgate University.

=== Founding ===
Asahel C. Kendrick, professor of Greek, was among the faculty that departed Madison University for Rochester. Kendrick served as acting president while a national search was conducted. He reprised this role until 1853, when Martin Brewer Anderson of the Andover Newton Theological Seminary in Massachusetts was selected to fill the inaugural posting.

The University of Rochester's new charter was awarded by the Regents of the State of New York on January 31, 1850. The charter stipulated that the university have $100,000 in endowment within five years, upon which the charter would be reaffirmed. An initial gift of $10,000 was pledged by John Wilder, which helped catalyze significant gifts from individuals and institutions.

Classes began that November, with approximately 60 students enrolled, including 28 transfers from Madison. From 1850 to 1862, the university was housed in the old United States Hotel in downtown Rochester on Buffalo Street near Elizabeth Street (now West Main Street near the I-490 overpass).

For the next 10 years, the college expanded its scope and secured its future through an expanding endowment, student body, and faculty. In parallel, a gift of 8 acres of farmland from local businessman and Congressman Azariah Boody secured the first campus of the university, upon which Anderson Hall was constructed and dedicated in 1862. Over the next sixty years, this Prince Street Campus grew by a further 17 acres and was developed to include fraternities houses, dormitories, and academic buildings including Anderson Hall, Sibley Library, Eastman and Carnegie Laboratories, the Memorial Art Gallery, and Cutler Union.

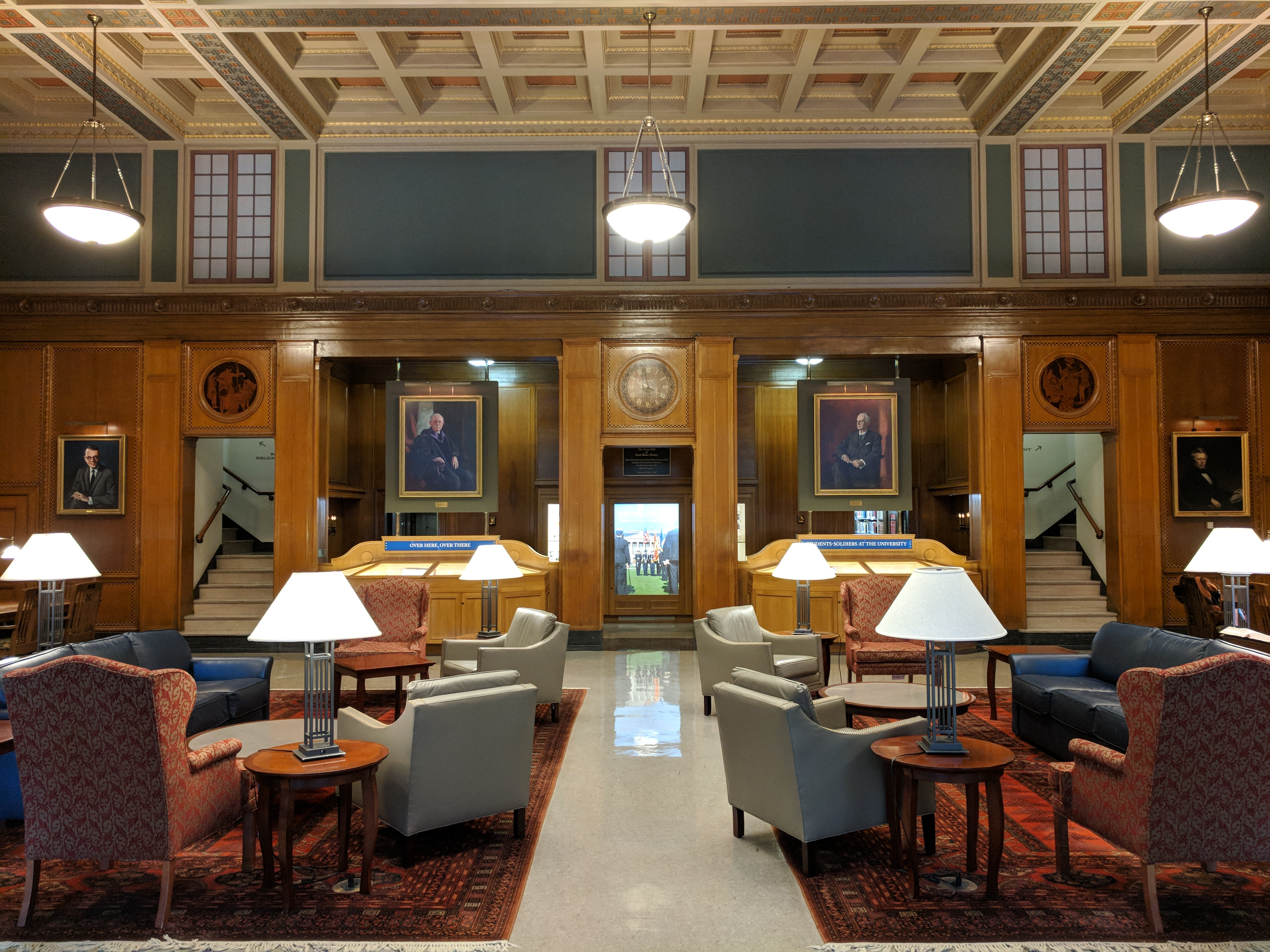
The Great Hall of Rush Rhees Library

=== 20th century ===
The first female students were admitted in 1900, the result of an effort led by famous suffragist Susan B. Anthony and Helen Barrett Montgomery. During the 1890s, a number of women took classes and labs at the university as "visitors" but were not officially enrolled nor were their records included in the college register. President David Jayne Hill allowed the first woman, Helen E. Wilkinson, to enroll as a normal student, although she was not allowed to matriculate or pursue a degree. Thirty-three women enrolled among the first class in 1900, and Ella S. Wilcoxen was the first to receive a degree, in 1901. The first female member of the faculty was Elizabeth Denio who retired as professor emeritus in 1917. Male students moved to River Campus upon its completion in 1930 while the female students remained on the Prince Street campus until 1955.

Anthony's work left a lasting impression on the university, with multiple awards, buildings and centers being named after her.

==== Expansion ====
Major growth occurred under the leadership of Benjamin Rush Rhees over his 1900–1935 tenure. During this period, George Eastman, innovator and entrepreneur who founded the Eastman Kodak Company, became a major donor, giving more than $50 million to the university during his life. Under the patronage of Eastman, the Eastman School of Music was created in 1921. In 1925, at the behest of the General Education Board and with significant support from John D. Rockefeller, George Eastman, and Henry A. Strong's family, medical and dental schools were created. The university awarded its first PhD that same year.

During World War II, the institution was one of 131 colleges and universities nationally that took part in the V-12 Navy College Training Program which offered students a path to a Navy commission. In 1942, the university was invited to join the Association of American Universities as an affiliate member and it was made a full member by 1944. Between 1946 and 1947, in infamous uranium experiments, researchers at the university injected uranium-234 and uranium-235 into six people to study how much uranium their kidneys could tolerate before becoming damaged. In 1955, the separate colleges for men and women were merged into the college on the River Campus. In 1958, three new schools were created in engineering, business administration, and education. With guidance provided by Lewis White Beck at this time, the university also acquired widespread international recognition for the excellence of its Ph.D. program in Philosophy as well as close research collaborations with Kantian scholars throughout Germany and the United States. The Graduate School of Management was named after William E. Simon, former Secretary of the Treasury in 1986. He committed significant funds to the school because of his belief in the school's free market philosophy and grounding in economic analysis. Under the leadership of William Riker, the Department of Political Science went from a six-person faculty with no graduate program to one of the most exciting political science departments in the United States. Riker established a new undergraduate program and trained an extraordinary number of graduate students. What emerged at the university, in the words of University of Georgia's Keith T. Poole and Princeton's Howard Rosenthal, was "the best doctoral program in political science in the world." According to Berkeley professors Nelson Polby and Eric Shickler, Rochester professor Richard Fenno "contributed more to the understanding of the U.S. Congress than any other scholar in the more than 200 years since the founding of the American nation".

==== Name change controversy ====
Following the princely gifts given throughout his life, George Eastman left the entirety of his estate to the university after his death by suicide. The total of these gifts surpassed $100 million, before inflation, and, as such, the university enjoyed a privileged position amongst the most well-endowed universities. During the expansion years between 1936 and 1976, the University of Rochester's financial position ranked third, near Harvard University's endowment and the University of Texas System's Permanent University Fund. Due to financial mismanagement combined with a decline in the value of large investments and a lack of portfolio diversity, the university's place dropped to the top 25 by the end of the 1980s. At the same time, the preeminence of the city of Rochester's major employers began to decline.

In response, the university commissioned a study to determine if the name of the institution should be changed to "Eastman University" or "Eastman Rochester University". The study concluded a name change could be beneficial because the use of a place name in the title led respondents to incorrectly believe it was a public university, and because the name "Rochester" connoted a "cold and distant outpost." Reports of the latter conclusion led to controversy and criticism in the Rochester community. Ultimately, the name "University of Rochester" was retained.

In response, university president Thomas H. Jackson announced the launch of a "Renaissance Plan" for the college that reduced enrollment from 4,500 to 3,600, creating a more selective admissions process. The plan also revised the undergraduate curriculum significantly, creating the current system with only one required course and only a few distribution requirements, known as clusters. Part of this plan called for the end of graduate doctoral studies in chemical engineering, comparative literature, linguistics, and mathematics, the last of which was met by national outcry. The plan was largely scrapped and mathematics exists as a graduate course of study to this day.

=== 21st century ===
Shortly after taking office, university president Joel Seligman commenced the private phase of the Meliora Challenge, a $1.2 billion capital campaign, in 2005. The campaign reached its goal in 2015, a year before the campaign was slated to conclude. In 2016, the university announced the Meliora Challenge had exceeded its goal and surpassed $1.36 billion. These funds were allocated to support over 100 new endowed faculty positions and nearly 400 new scholarships.

After and during the completion of the challenge, the university embarked on a new phase of construction, resulting in the addition of significant campus facilities. This expansion included the construction of two new student dormitories, O'Brien Hall (2013) and Genesee Hall (2017). Furthermore, other additions included Wegmans Hall (2016), a new building for the Computer and Data Science Departments, LeChase Hall (2013), designed to host the Warner School of Education, and Rettner Hall (2013). The university also expanded the Medical Center, constructing a new Children's Hospital, cancer center and research building.

On September 1, 2017, a complaint was filed by eight current and former faculty members at the University of Rochester with the United States Equal Employment Opportunity Commission (EEOC). The complaint includes allegations of sexual misconduct/harassment by a tenure track faculty member, and condemnation of the response of the university administration. The university's initial public response to the complaint was a claim that the allegations were thoroughly investigated and could not be substantiated. A new, independent investigation found the individuals covered in the report had not violated policy; however, significant recommendations were made to push the university towards leadership in policy regarding relationships between faculty, staff, employees, and students. On the same day as the release of the report, university president Joel Seligman publicly announced his previously tendered resignation. In 2019, federal judge Lawrence Vilardo ruled in favor of the plaintiffs on 15 of 16 legal claims, allowing their lawsuit to proceed. After a mediation process, the lawsuit was settled in 2020 when the university agreed to pay the plaintiffs $9.4 million, and thanked them for their efforts. As of January 2026, the individual accused in the above matters remains a member of the university's faculty.

Sarah C. Mangelsdorf succeeded Feldman as president of the university in 2019. Mangelsdorf is the first woman to serve as president of the university.

In 2021, the Sloan Performing Arts Center opened, providing space for theatrical programs, dance programs, concerts, and other activities and serves as a home for the Institute for the Performing Arts. In 2023, the university completed the $51.5m purchase of College Town, a 312,000-square-foot, mixed-use complex near the Medical Center and began work on a $42m expansion of the Laboratory for Laser Energetics.

After student protests against the Israel–Hamas war in November 2023, University of Rochester students joined other campuses across the United States in setting up encampments on campus. The university suspended and banned several students from campus for participating in the protests. The Department of Public Safety also arrested four students on felony criminal mischief charges in November 2024 for allegedly plastering "wanted" posters across campus that the university denounced as "antisemitic".

Strong Memorial Hospital, the main teaching hospital at the university, is currently undergoing its largest expansion, tripling the size of its Emergency department and adding a new, nine-story patient tower, which is the largest capital project in university history. In 2024, Tom Golisano announced that he had made a $50 million donation, the largest single gift in the university's history, to build the Golisano Intellectual and Developmental Disabilities Institute and expand care for people with intellectual and developmental disabilities in the Rochester region.

== Administration ==
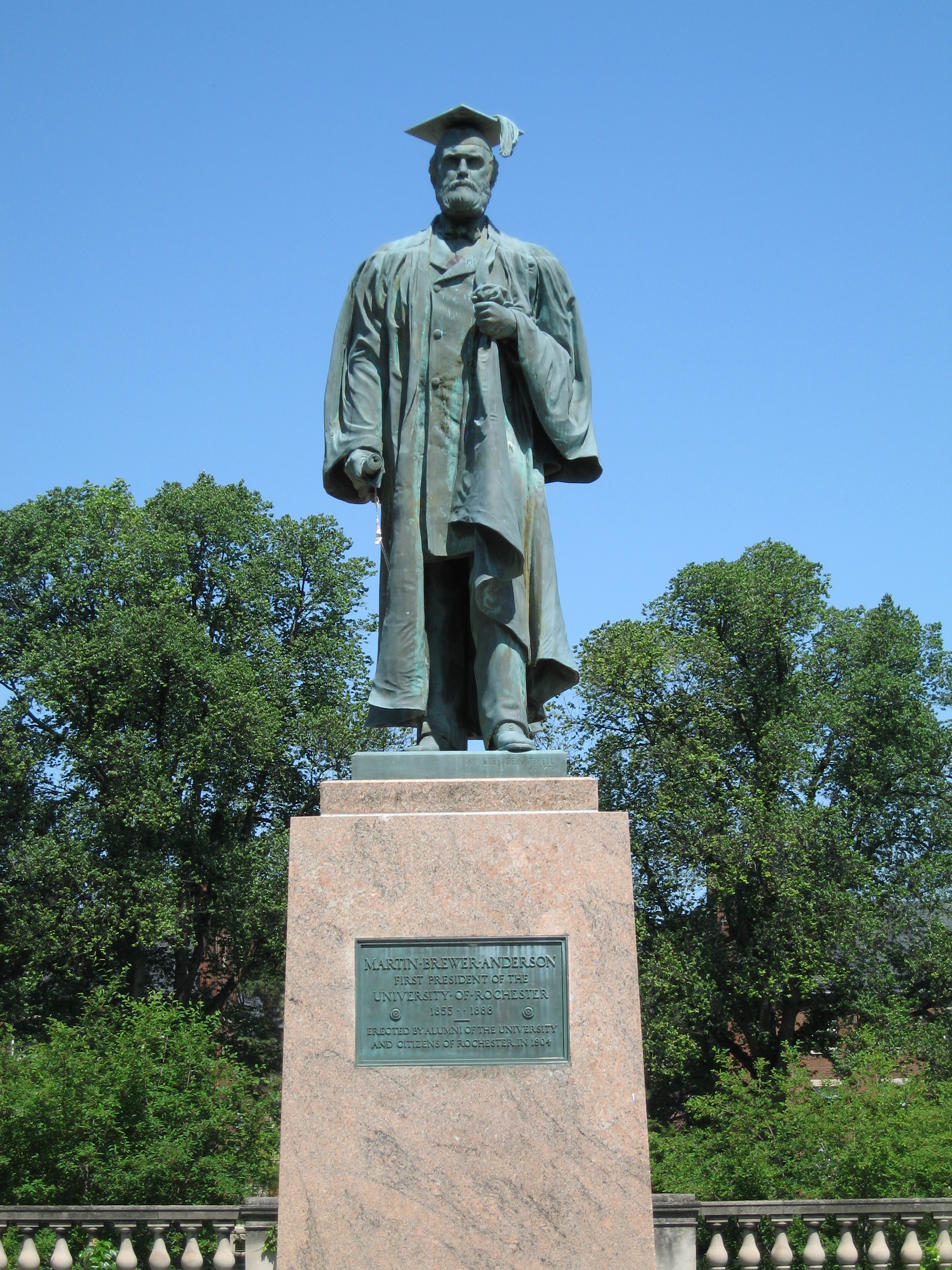
Statue of Rochester's first president, Martin Brewer Anderson.

The university is headed by a board of trustees, with alumnus Chris Boehning as the chairman. The board appoints the president of the university. As of 2019, eleven people have held the role of regularly-appointed president. On four occasions, the board of trustees has called upon members of the faculty to serve as an executive officer (Kendrick), acting president (Lattimore and Burton), or interim president (Feldman) during periods of transition.

Presidents
Name	Tenure	Academic Field	Relationship to University
Asahel C. Kendrick	pre–1853	Greek	Professor of Greek
Martin Brewer Anderson	1853–1888	Theology	First President
David Jayne Hill	1889–1896	Diplomacy	Second President
Samuel Allan Lattimore	1896–1898	Chemistry	Professor of Chemistry
Henry Fairfield Burton	1898–1900	Latin	Professor of Latin
Benjamin Rush Rhees	1900–1935	Theology	Third President
Alan Valentine	1935–1950	English	Fourth President
Cornelis de Kiewiet	1951–1961	History	Fifth President
W. Allen Wallis	1962–1975	Economics	Sixth President
Robert Sproull	1975–1984	Physics	Seventh President
G. Dennis O'Brien	1984–1994	Philosophy	Eighth President
Thomas H. Jackson	1994–2005	Law	Ninth President
Joel Seligman	2005–2018	Law	Tenth President
Richard Feldman	2018–2019	Philosophy	Professor of Philosophy
Sarah C. Mangelsdorf	2019–	Psychology	Eleventh President

== Campuses ==
=== River Campus ===
The River Campus is in a bend of the Genesee River about 2 miles (3 km) south of downtown Rochester and covers around 200 acres (81 ha). It is bounded by Bausch & Lomb Riverside Park, an 18-acre (7.3 ha) public park along the east bank of the Genesee River formerly known as the Olmstead River Walk, and Mount Hope Cemetery, where the grave sites of Susan B. Anthony and Frederick Douglass can be found. The River Campus was acquired in the late 1920s from the Oak Hill Country Club through a land swap deal orchestrated in part by Edwin Sage Hubbell and funded largely by George Eastman.

After a period of landscaping, grading, and construction, the original buildings of the campus were dedicated in 1930 when the first class of River Campus was welcomed to the Men's college. The main academic buildings are examples of the Greek Revival style in 20th-century collegiate architecture. The main buildings situated upon the Eastman Quadrangle are Rush Rhees Library at the head, flanked by the Morey Hall, Bausch & Lomb Hall, Lattimore Hall, and Dewey Hall. The Rush Rhees Library, the unofficial symbol of the university, is also home to the Hopeman Memorial Carillon, the largest carillon in New York State, featuring 50 bells that chime on the quarter-hour. Todd Union, constructed in 1930, has been recommended by New York State's Board for Historic Preservation to be added to the State and National Registers of Historic Places as "a key site associated with Rochester's LGBTQ+ history". Todd Union has an early and significant association with the University of Rochester's Gay Liberation Front (UR GLF), an organization that worked to advance the gay liberation movement on campus and in the city of Rochester in the 1970s.

River Campus is home to a number of student exhibition spaces. The AsIs Gallery in the Sage Art Center showcases rotating exhibitions of student works from studio classes. As a work-in-progress critique space, this exhibition space provides students the opportunity to develop their work in a semi-professional space. The Gallery at the Art and Music Library features work from students and local artists in the highly trafficked Rush Rhees Art and Music Library. Hartnett Gallery, in Wilson Commons, is a student-supported gallery that showcases international and professional contemporary artists as well as an annual juried student exhibition. The pasSAGE is an annex of the Sage Art Center which features a long-term exhibition selected by a faculty committee. There is also a Senior Thesis Gallery in the Sage Arts Center that features senior undergraduate works.

=== Medical Center ===
The University of Rochester Medical Center (URMC) is the primary campus for the university's medical education, research and main patient care facility. The Medical Center is next to the River Campus and is dominated by Strong Memorial Hospital, the School of Medicine and Dentistry building, and the Arthur Kornberg Medical Research Building. URMC also houses the School of Nursing, Golisano Children's Hospital, and a variety of research centers, including the Wilmot Cancer Center, the Aab Institute of Biomedical Sciences, and the Clinical and Translational Sciences Institute.

=== Eastman School of Music ===
The Eastman School of Music is situated on its own campus in downtown Rochester, which includes a residence for students, classroom and performance facilities, and the Eastman Theatre, a 2,326-seat concert hall which also serves as the primary venue of the Rochester Philharmonic Orchestra. The campus also features the Sibley Music Library, which is the largest academic music library in North America, as well as the largest privately owned collection of sheet music. Students are housed at 100 Gibbs Street, a dormitory building constructed in 1991.

=== South Campus ===
The South Campus is in Brighton, immediately south of Rochester proper. The campus includes student housing for graduate students, the Laboratory for Laser Energetics, a Department of Energy-funded national lab, the Larry and Cindy Bloch Alumni and Advancement Center, the Center for Optics Manufacturing, the Center for Optoelectronics and Imaging, and the now-defunct Nuclear Structure Research Laboratory (NSRL).

=== Mount Hope Campus ===
The Mount Hope Campus consists of a number of old mansion homes including the Witmer Family House, the residence of the president of the university, and the Patrick Barry House, which serves as the official residence of the provost of the university.

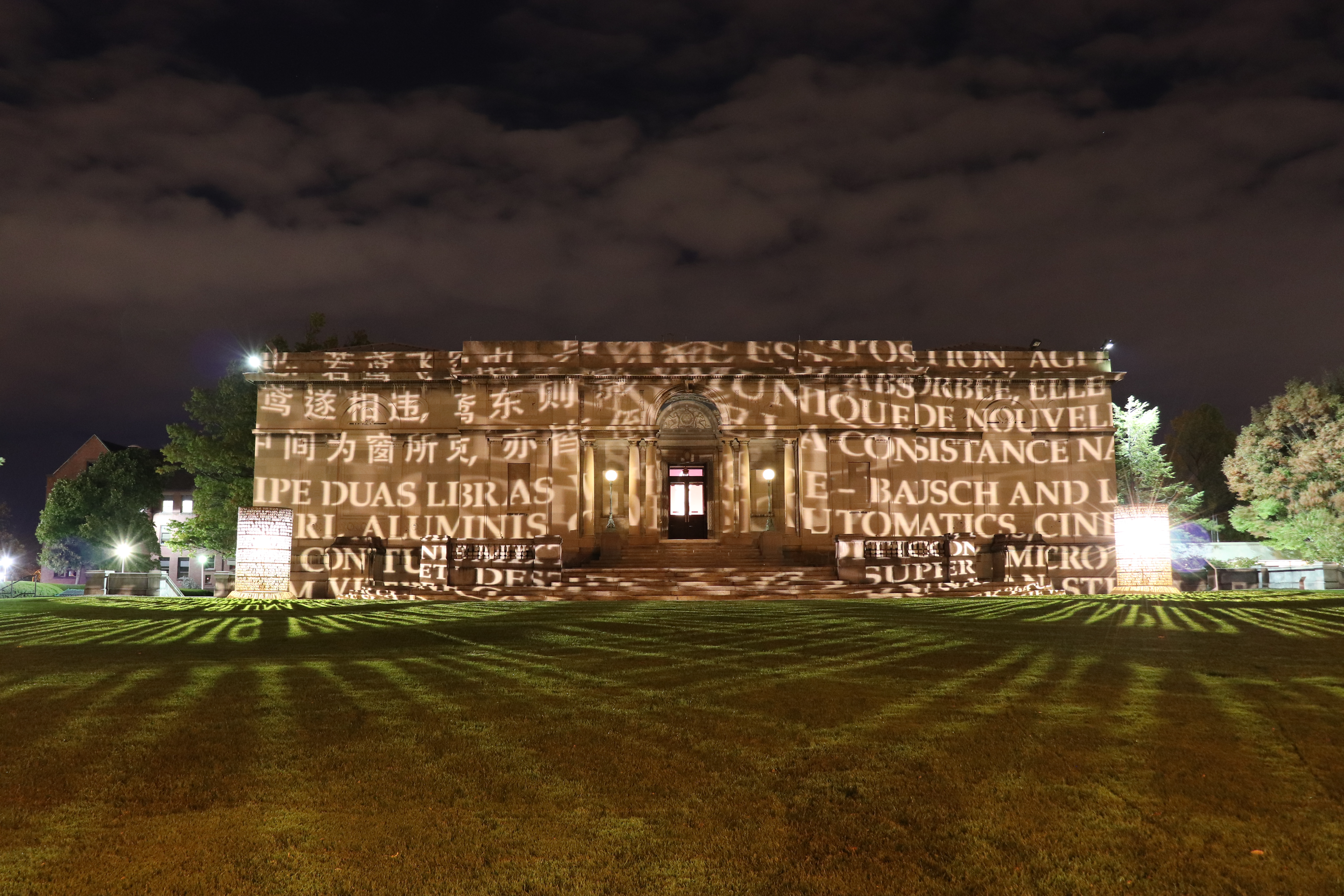
Memorial Art Gallery

=== Memorial Art Gallery ===
The university's first permanent campus was at the former farm of Azariah Boody. While a number of buildings still stand including Anderson Hall, the Eastman Laboratories, and a number of student dormitories, these buildings have been absorbed by private companies or the Rochester School of the Arts. The university retains control of a few acres of land including the land under the Sibley Library (razed), old campus gates, the Memorial Art Gallery's old and new wings, and the Cutler Union, a prime example of the Collegiate Gothic style of 20th-century architecture.

The Memorial Art Gallery was founded in 1913 as a part of the University of Rochester through a gift from Emily Sibley Watson as a memorial to her son, James George Averell. It was designed by the prominent American architectural firm McKim, Mead, and White and occupies the southern half of the university's Prince Street campus.

== Academics ==
The University of Rochester's undergraduate enrollment includes approximately 6,400 full-time and about 330 part-time students from across the U.S. and over 115 countries. Graduate enrollment includes approximately 3,750 full-time and about 1,600 part-time graduate students. The university has more than 103,000 living alumni and employs nearly 2,300 tenure-track faculty, with more than 20,000 faculty and staff across the university and the Strong Health System. The only required undergraduate course is the first-year writing seminar. In lieu of a core curriculum, undergraduates complete coursework in each of three disciplines: humanities, social sciences, and natural sciences. Students choose a major, consisting of more than ten courses, and a cluster, consisting of three related courses. The student must ensure at least a cluster is met in each discipline; however, second majors and minors are often used to fulfill these requirements. Students who pursue accredited engineering fields are exempt from this system and are required to have only one humanities or social science cluster.

=== Research ===
The University of Rochester is a member of the Association of American Universities and is classified among "R1: Doctoral Universities – Very High Research Activity". The university had a research expenditure of $481 million in 2023. In 2008, it ranked 44th nationally in research spending, but this ranking has declined gradually to 70 in 2023. Some of the major research centers include the Laboratory for Laser Energetics, a laser-based nuclear fusion facility, and the extensive research facilities at the University of Rochester Medical Center. Recently, the university has also engaged in a series of new initiatives to expand its programs in biomedical engineering and optics, including the construction of the new $37 million Robert B. Goergen Hall for Biomedical Engineering and Optics on the River Campus. Other new research initiatives include a cancer stem cell program and a Clinical and Translational Sciences Institute. The university also has the ninth highest technology revenue among U.S. higher education institutions, with $46 million being paid for commercial rights to university technology and research in 2009.

Notable patents include Zoloft and Gardasil. WeBWorK, a web-based system for checking homework and providing immediate feedback for students, was developed by University of Rochester professors Gage and Pizer. The system is now in use at over 800 universities and colleges, as well as several secondary and primary schools. University of Rochester scientists work in diverse areas. For example, physicists developed a technique for etching metal surfaces, such as platinum, titanium, and brass, with powerful lasers, enabling self-cleaning surfaces that repel water droplets and will not rust if tilted at a 4-degree angle and medical researchers are exploring how brains rid themselves of toxic waste during sleep.

=== Colleges of Arts, Sciences and Engineering ===
Arts, Sciences and Engineering (ASE) at the University of Rochester comprises the School of Arts and Sciences and the Hajim School of Engineering and Applied Sciences. Within ASE, the college is home for most undergraduates during their studies at the University of Rochester. The graduate training provided by the departments and programs at ASE account for over 60% of the PhD degrees awarded by the university. With 19 departments, more than a dozen programs, and numerous centers and institutes, Arts & Sciences is the largest school at the university. These include the Goergen Institute for Data Science, the Humanities Center, and the Institute for Performing Arts.

Established in 1958, the Hajim School comprises a variety of programs, departments, and institutes, including Audio and music engineering, Biomedical engineering, Chemical engineering, Computer science, Electrical and computer engineering, the Institute of Optics, and Mechanical engineering. The school has doubled the number of undergraduate students it encompasses since 2008. The school was named after Edmund Hajim, a trustee of the university, in 2009 after a $30-million gift to the university. The Institute of Optics has been regarded among the premier optics programs in the world.

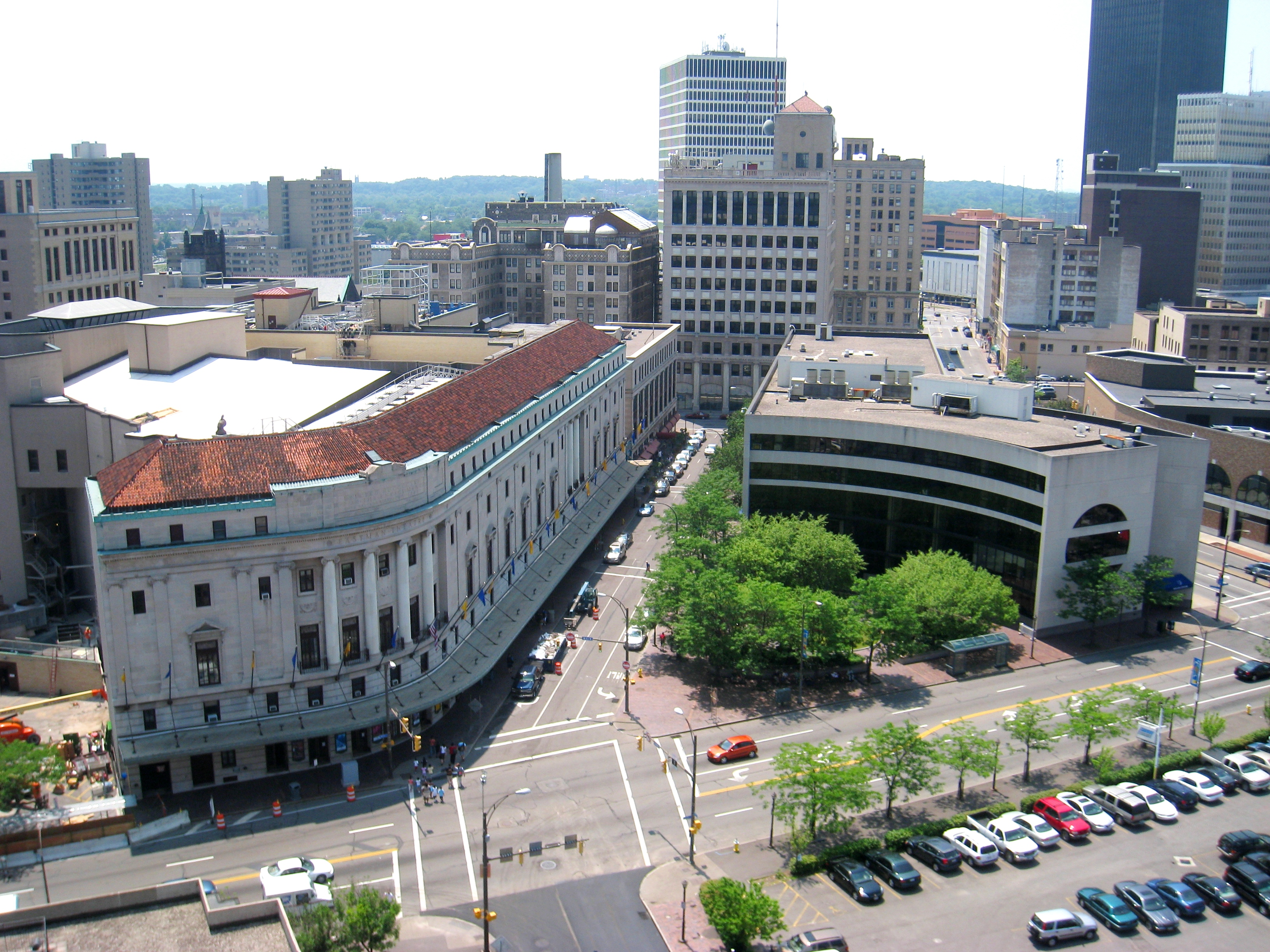
Eastman School in Downtown Rochester

=== Eastman School of Music ===
The Eastman School of Music is a music conservatory offering both undergraduate and graduate education in a number of music fields, including composition, theory, and performance.

=== School of Medicine and Dentistry ===
The School of Medicine and Dentistry is a medical and dental school with both research and clinical programs. Established in 1921, the School consists of approximately 1200 full-time faculty members and 650 voluntary clinical faculty members organized into 32 departments and centers. Nearly 500 graduate students and 200 postdoctoral appointees are in training.

In 2022, the school received 5,669 applications and accepted 70 students from AMCAS and 38 students from special matriculating programs, with an acceptance rate of 1.2%. U.S. News ranks the school 32nd for research and 40th for primary care. The university is known for its competitive Rochester Early Medical Scholars (REMS) program, an eight-year BA/BS + MD program. Admission to the program is separate from admission to the college and requires additional application materials and interviews.

The School of Dentistry is known as the Eastman Institute for Oral Health. Established in 1905 as Eastman Dental Center, it merged with the university in 1997. As of 2020, it was the 7th top funded institution by the National Institute of Dental and Craniofacial Research (NIDCR), part of National Institutes of Health (NIH).

=== School of Nursing ===
The School of Nursing is a nursing school on the campus of the University of Rochester Medical Center.

=== Warner School of Education ===
The Warner School of Education is the university's graduate school of education. It is located on the River Campus in LeChase Hall.

=== Simon Business School ===
Simon Business School is the graduate business school, based out of Schlegel and Gleason Halls on the River Campus.

== Rankings ==
Academic rankings

National
- Forbes: 69
- U.S. News & World Report: 49
- Washington Monthly: 243
- WSJ/College Pulse: 58

Global
- ARWU: 201-300
- QS: 236
- THE: 127
- U.S. News & World Report: 201

The University of Rochester is accredited by the Middle States Commission on Higher Education. In 2025, Forbes magazine's America's Top Colleges series ranked the university 69th in the United States overall. The 2025-26 U.S. News & World Report Best Colleges Ranking placed the university 46th in the country overall, while Washington Monthly placed the University of Rochester 48th in the country (best college for research) and The Wall Street Journal ranked it 58th in the United States overall.

== Student life ==
Student body composition as of May 2, 2022
Race and ethnicity	Total
White	42%
Foreign national	27%
Asian	12%
Hispanic	8%
Other (Note: Other consists of Multiracial Americans & those who prefer to not say.)	6%
Black	5%
Economic diversity
Low-income (Note: The percentage of students who received an income-based federal Pell grant intended for low-income students.)	19%
Affluent (Note: The percentage of students who are a part of the American middle class at the bare minimum.)	81%

The university's seal features a book, representing arts and sciences, a lyre symbolizing music, and a modified symbol of medicine. The official flower of the university is the dandelion, purportedly prolific on the cow pasture that became the university's second campus.

The official mascot of the university is a predatory wasp found throughout Rochester, the yellowjacket. From 1983 to 2008, the mascot was named "URBee." However, when the university re-designed the mascot during the 2007–2008 academic year, a new name was chosen. As of February 1, 2008, the school's mascot is now known as "Rocky".

The university uses Rochester Blue and Dandelion Yellow as its official colors, which are the prominent colors on the official regalia. The motto of the university is "Meliora," which loosely translates to "better" with the connotation of "ever better," the meaning adopted by the university.

The image of Rush Rhees Library's main dome serves as an additional icon for the University of Rochester. Rush Rhees Library at The University of Rochester was featured on the cover of the "Princeton Review 373 Best Colleges 2011 Edition".

The song most often sung at college events, led often by the school's many a cappella groups, is The Genesee, written by former Rochester student Thomas Thackeray Swinburne (Class of 1892). Although less frequently used, the university also has an official Alma Mater, The Dandelion Yellow.

=== Student organizations ===
There are over 275 active groups on campus, which range from cultural dance groups to the university's improvisational comedy troupe In Between the Lines. Since 1873, the university has regularly printed its student newspaper, the Campus Times. There is also the student-run, online-only publication, The Rival Rochester. This is a source of opinion, commentary, and satire.

The university is well known for its a cappella groups, the YellowJackets, the Midnight Ramblers, Vocal Point, After Hours, and Trebellius, who have multiple local, state and national awards. The University of Rochester is also home to its own radio station, WRUR, that is located in Todd Union.

=== Activities and events ===
Wilson Commons Students Activities (WCSA) is a student-led group in charge of planning and organizing events for undergraduate students.

Annual events include the Celebrate Diversity concert and Yellowjacket Weekend during orientation week, Winterfest Weekend in February, Spirit Week, Springfest Weekend and Senior Day.

Meliora Weekend is the annual alumni reunion, usually held in October or September, bringing together thousands of alumni for a week of food, drink and dance.

=== Students' Association ===
The Students' Association (SA) is the primary student governing body and includes most of the student groups at the university. It is governed by the SA Senate, President, and Vice President, all of whom are elected by the student body. The SA President may choose to appoint an advisory cabinet made up of a group of volunteer students. There is also a judicial branch, composed of the All Campus Judicial Council (ACJC), the members of whom are nominated by an interview committee and approved by the SA Senate.

=== Spiritual life ===
The central space on campus for spiritual activity is the university's Interfaith Chapel, located just opposite Rush Rhees Library and the Eastman Quad. Housing a large sanctuary, river level worship area, kitchen, lounge, meeting, and office space, the Chapel serves some twelve chaplaincies, including those within Buddhist; Christian; Hindu; Interfaith, Non-Religious, and Secular; Jewish; Muslim; and Pagan communities, and several student spiritual clubs.

There are additional spaces off and on campus that serve students of these communities, including the Rohr Chabad House - Center for Jewish Life and the future Mack Catholic Center (Newman) and Greenbaum Center for Jewish Life (Hillel).

=== Housing and dining ===
The majority of undergraduate students at the university live and take classes on the River Campus. Students are required to live on campus for their Freshman and Sophomore years, and then have the option of remaining on campus or moving off campus. 7 out of 10 undergraduates choose to live on campus for all four years. Freshman live in one of two groupings of dorms - the First-Year Hill or the First-Year Quad. The First-Year Hill consists of Susan B Anthony Hall, the largest undergraduate dorm, and Genesee Hall, the newest undergraduate dorm. The First-Year Quad consists of Lovejoy, Tiernan, Gilbert and Hoeing Halls. Most freshman live in a double room, with a few in single or triples. Upperclassman have multiple options to choose from, ranging from older dorms on the river campus to newer apartment-style options across the Genesee River. These include a mixture of singles, doubles, and suites.

There are seven fraternities with houses on campus, situated on the fraternity quadrangle near the First-Year Quad. Smaller fraternities and all sororities occupies floors in residential buildings in Jackson Court and Hill Court. There are a number of off-campus fraternities situated across the Genesee River on Plymouth Avenue and Genesee Street.

The university has two main dining halls, Danforth Dining (located in Susan B Anthony Hall) and Douglas Dining (located in Douglas Commons). Other options include Rocky's, a sandwich shop and lounge and the Pit (both located in Wilson Commons).

=== Campus and area transportation ===
The university's campuses have their own university-sponsored system of buses, or shuttles, which provide free transportation from the River Campus to the Medical Center, South Campus, Eastman Campus, and Downtown Rochester. There are also lines that run between the River Campus and local shopping and entertainment destinations in Henrietta and Pittsford. On the weekends, a special shuttle loops to Rochester Public Market and Marketplace Mall. Most of the university-sponsored buses are named using a color system (e.g. Red Line) that indicates their respective route and allows for easy identification. Several bus lines of the Rochester-Genesee Regional Transportation Authority (RTS) made stops at the university until 2020.

The Frederick Douglass Greater Rochester International Airport is a ten-minute drive to the west of the River Campus. In addition, Amtrak train and Greyhound bus have stations in downtown Rochester to the north of the campus. SA traditionally sponsors free student shuttles to the airport, train station, and bus station for Move-in, Move-out, Christmas, Thanksgiving and Spring Break.

== Traditions ==
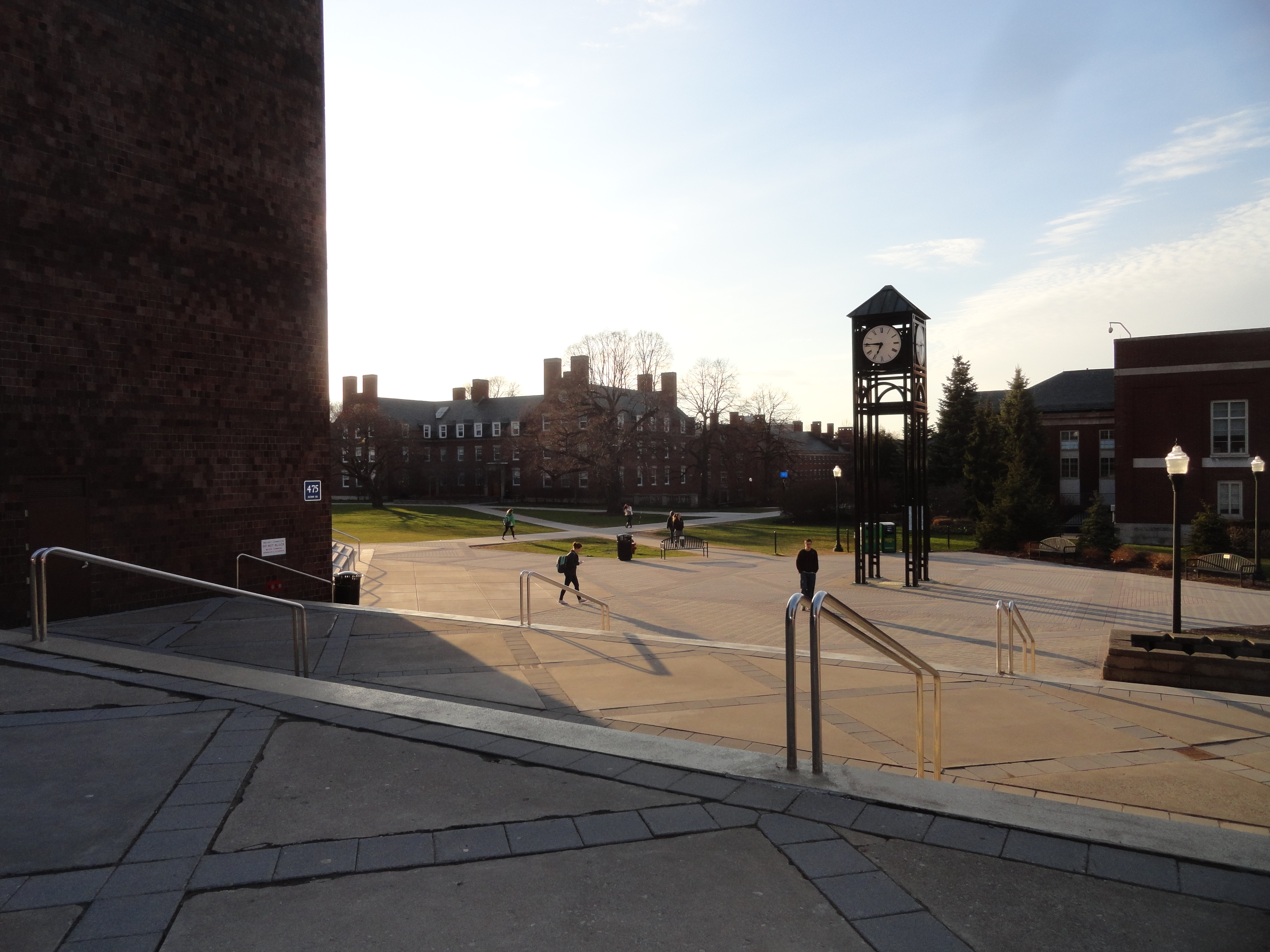
The Clock Tower at Dandelion Square

=== Boar's Head Dinner ===
The Boar's Head Dinner is an annual medieval student feast that was first celebrated on December 17, 1934. Students dress up in costumes, and the setting resembles a 16th Century English Court. The first dinners were held in Todd Union and are currently held at the Feldman Ballroom in Douglas Commons. Among the evening's events is an annual 'Reading of the Boar', a retelling of the Boar's Head legend by a member of the faculty.

=== Dandelion Day ===
Usually referred to as 'D-Day' or 'Drinking Day' by students, Dandelion Day is one of the university's longest standing traditions that celebrates the last full week of classes in the spring semester. Events usually include food trucks, a concert, and special parties held by fraternities and sororities. In 2008, Dandelion Day lost funding from the school administration but was eventually brought back due to student demand. Dandelion Day is usually held on the Friday of Springfest Weekend.

== Athletics ==
The University of Rochester's athletics teams are collectively known as the Yellowjackets. The university is a member of the Division III of the National Collegiate Athletic Association (NCAA), primarily competing in dual membership with the University Athletic Association (UAA) and the Liberty League. One exception to this is the men's squash team, which is consistently ranked top 5 in the NCAA Division I ranks.

University of Rochester athletes competes in 23 intercollegiate varsity sports: Men's sports include baseball, basketball, cross country, football, golf, soccer, squash, swimming & diving, tennis and track & field (indoor and outdoor); while women's sports include basketball, cross country, field hockey, lacrosse, rowing, soccer, softball, swimming & diving, tennis, track & field (indoor and outdoor) and volleyball.

=== Accomplishments ===
In 2009 women's soccer coach Terry Gurnett set records with over 400-lifetime wins. In March 2010 the women's basketball team made it to the NCAA's Final Four. The men's soccer team made it to the NCAA Elite Eight in 2017 and the NCAA Final Four in 2018. In 2021, the softball team reached the Division III women's college world series.

=== Club/intramural sports ===
There are also numerous clubs and intramural athletics groups. Popular club sports include hockey, ultimate frisbee, rugby, and soccer, which all have men's and women's teams. The men's rugby team has enjoyed recent success, with a New York State Conference Championship in 2011. The team was ranked 9th in the nation out of 151 Division III teams for the 2011–2012 season.

=== Facilities ===
The main athletic facilities of the university are in Goergen Athletic Center and Prince Athletic Complex on the River Campus, with other facilities in the Spurrier building (River Campus) and the Medical Center.

Prince Athletic Complex include Fauver Stadium, home of the track & field, football and soccer teams and Towers Field, the baseball stadium.

Facilities in the Goorgen Athletic Center include the Speegle-Wilbraham Center, home of the Swimming and Diving program, Louis Alexander Palestra, Lyman Squash Center, an Indoor Recreation and Tennis Center, Bloch Fitness Center and the Hajim Gymnasium.

== Notable alumni and faculty ==
The University of Rochester has more than 120,000 alumni. Alumni, faculty, and affiliates of the university include recipients of 9 National Medals of Science and 13 Pulitzer Prizes.

Thirteen graduates or faculty members have earned a Nobel Prize, while others have earned the highest honors awarded to Americans by the United States government. These include 4 recipients of the National Medal of Technology and Innovation (Alejandro Zaffaroni, Rangaswamy Srinivasan, Dace Viceps Madore, Maya Koster). Many scientists on NASA's advisory board for the James Webb Space Telescope are alumni or faculty members.

Graduates have been leaders in business. Notable alumni include Joseph C. Wilson, founder and CEO of Xerox; Barry Meyer, chairman and CEO of Warner Bros., and billionaires Paul Singer and Alan Zekelman.

In addition, alumni have served in the United States Congress or held other senior government positions. These include Congressmen Sereno E. Payne, Jacob Sloat Fassett, and Samuel S. Stratton, Ambassadors Kenneth Keating and George F. Ward, senior government officials Steven Chu, Vittorio Grilli, Lawrence Kudlow, Anthony Petruccelli and Donald C. Winter, as well as Governor Josh Shapiro.

== See also ==
- George Eastman House
- University of Rochester Arboretum
