= Independence Hall replicas and derivatives =

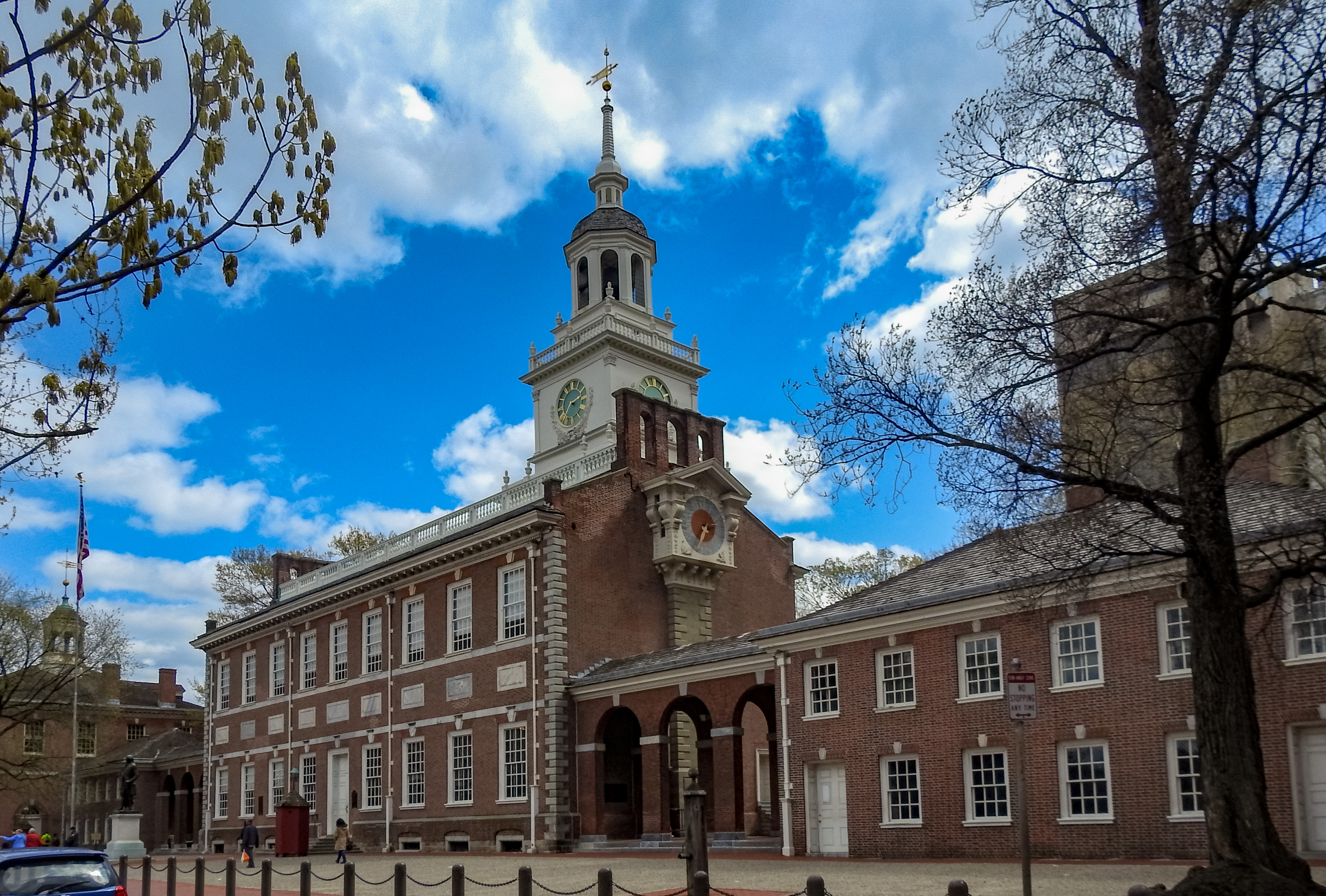
Independence Hall in Philadelphia

Independence Hall replicas are buildings, models and miniatures replicating or inspired by the design of Independence Hall in Philadelphia, Pennsylvania, United States.

== History ==
Independence Hall (1732–1753) was built as the State House for the Colony of Pennsylvania. The Second Continental Congress met there from May 1775 to December 1776, from March to September 1777, and from July 1778 to March 1781. The Declaration of Independence was debated and signed in the hall. Congress under the Articles of Confederation met there from March 1781 to June 1783. The Constitutional Convention met there from May to September 1787, where it debated, wrote, and signed the United States Constitution.

== Buildings ==
- South San Francisco City Hall (1920), South San Francisco, California.
- Stock Yards National Bank (1925), Chicago, Illinois.
- Reading Hospital (1928), West Reading, Pennsylvania
- Baker Memorial Library (1928), Dartmouth College, Hanover, New Hampshire, Jens Fredrick Larson, architect.
- Freeport Village Hall (1928), Freeport, New York.
- Henry Ford Museum (1929), Dearborn, Michigan, Robert O. Derrick, architect.
- Liberty Motor Car Company Headquarters (1929), Detroit, Michigan, Robert O. Derrick, architect. In the 1970s and 1980s, it housed offices of Budd-ThyssenKrupp. (Demolished April 2017)
- Walter F. George School of Law (1932), Mercer University, Macon, Georgia.
- LaGuardia Hall Library (1936), Brooklyn College, Brooklyn, New York.
- Founders Library, Howard University (1937), Washington, D.C., Albert Cassell, architect.
- Draper Hall (1938), Berea College, Berea, Kentucky.
- Miller Library (1939), Colby College, Waterville, Maine, Jens Fredrick Larson, architect.
- Bellarmine-Jefferson High School (1944), Burbank, California. Replicates the facade, inner staircase, and handrail.
- Ellen Clarke Bertrand Library (1951), Bucknell University, Lewisburg, Pennsylvania, Jens Fredrick Larson, architect.
- Queens County Savings Bank (1954), Kew Gardens Hills, New York, Harold O. Carlson, architect.
- Independence Mall (shopping center) (1964), 1601 Concord Pike (U.S. Route 202), Wilmington, Delaware.
- Knott's Berry Farm (1966), Buena Park, California. A full-size replica claimed to be the only exact replica of the original structure in the U.S. The interior scenes of Independence Hall for the 2004 movie National Treasure were filmed here.
- Benjamin Franklin Savings & Loan (1971), 10201 SE Washington Street, Portland, Oregon. Now a Bank of America branch.
- Hall of Presidents (1971), Walt Disney World, Lake Buena Vista, Florida. Independence Hall was also among the inspirations for the EPCOT theme park's American pavilion.
- Mahler Student Center (1992), Dallas Baptist University, Dallas, Texas.
- Harold W. Lanzer Museum (1993-2007), 12902 Ohio Route 18, east of Holgate, Ohio. In retirement, carpenter Lanzer spent 14 years building a 3/8-scale replica on his side yard. (Note: Harold W. Lanzer (2007): "Up here at the bank they have these calendars with the Independence Hall on them. I got the idea I could build an Independence Hall out here and then I would have a place to put that clock in and build my own museum. That is what I set out to do. I started with that in 1993 when I was 68 years old.")
- Founding Fathers Museum (2014), Rapid City, South Dakota.
- (proposed) Center for Law and Liberty, Houston Baptist University, Houston, Texas. HBU is currently (2015), fund-raising to build an Independence Hall replica to house its law school.
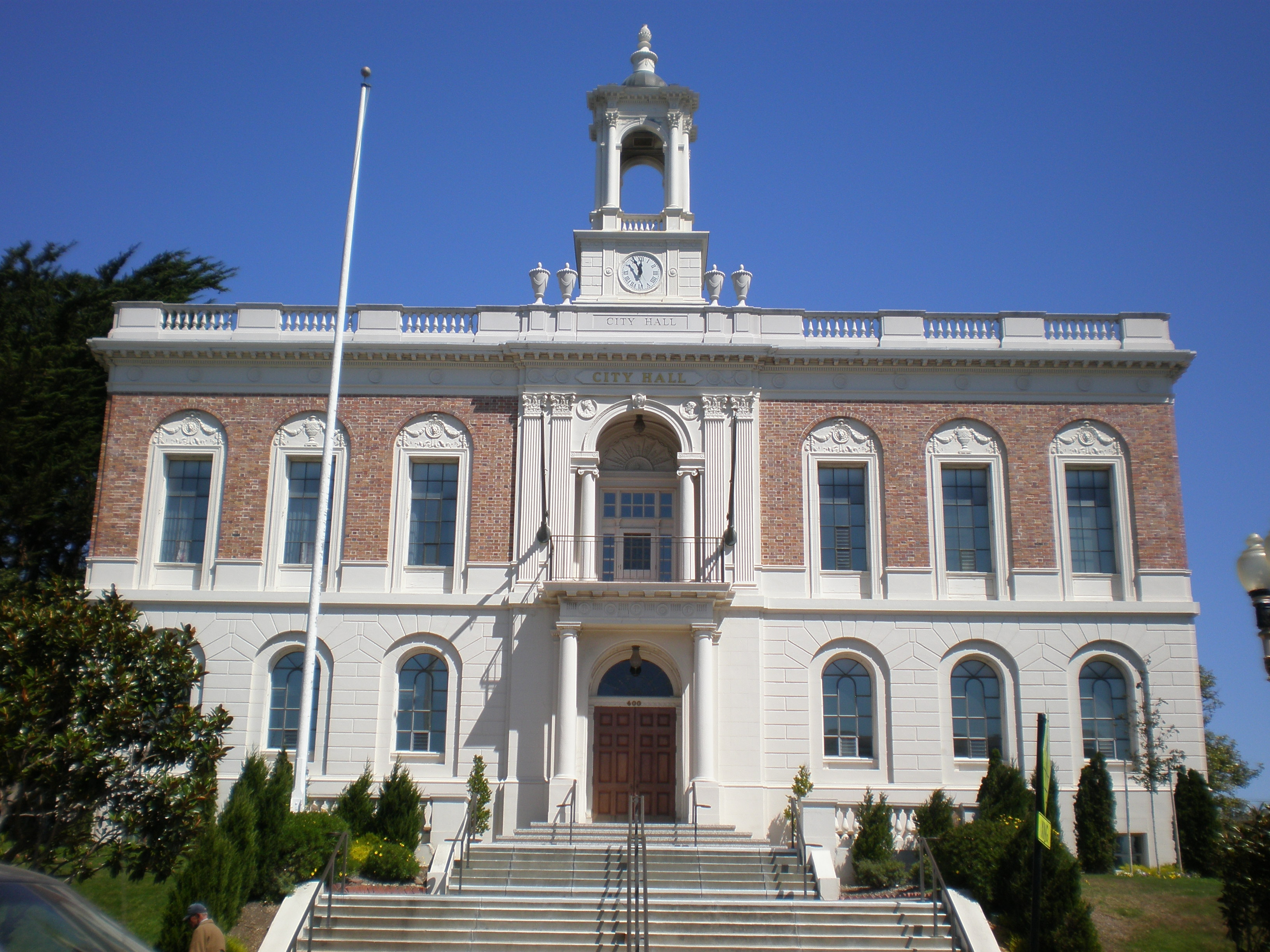
South San Francisco City Hall (1920), San Francisco, California

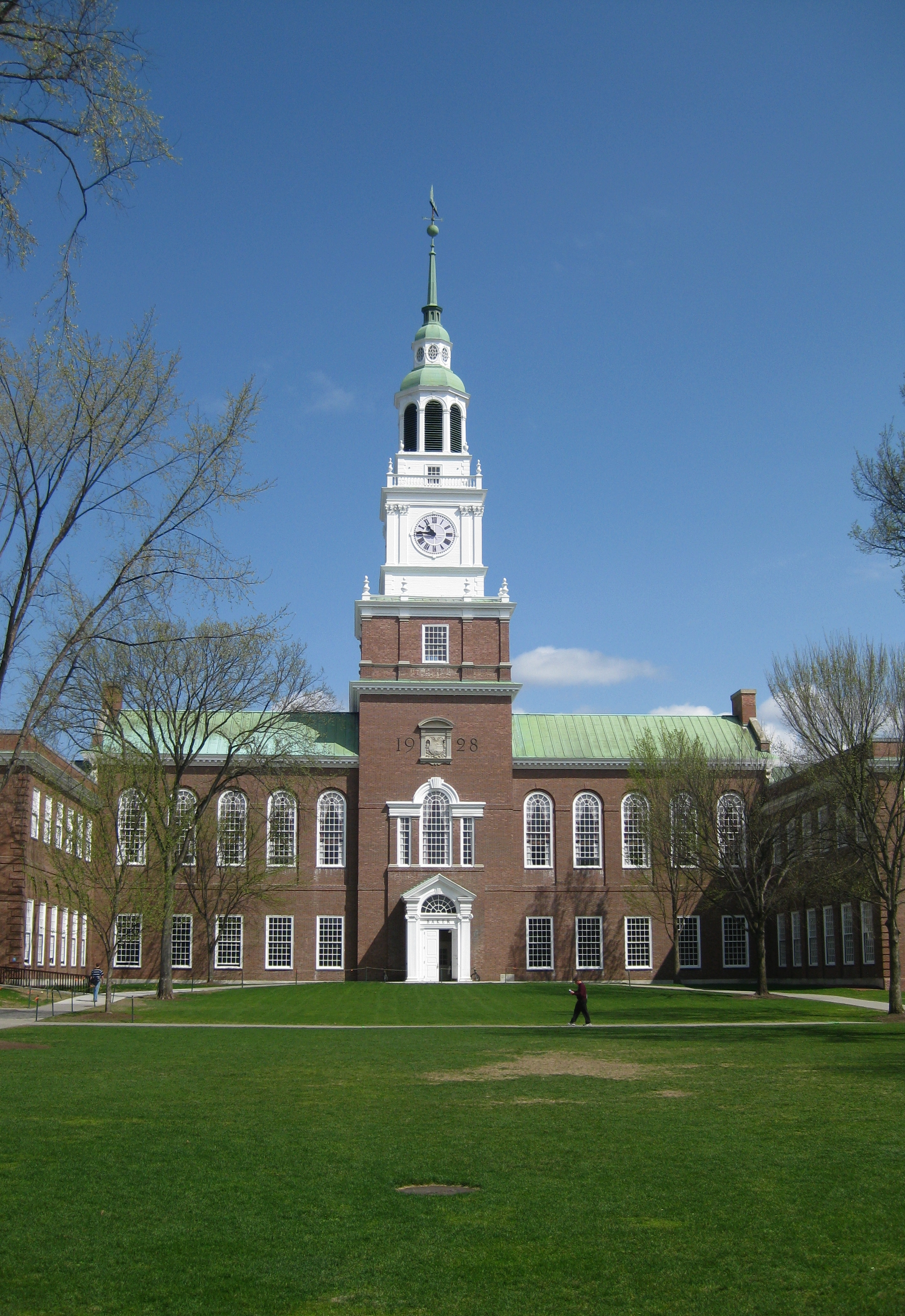
Baker Memorial Library (1928), Dartmouth College

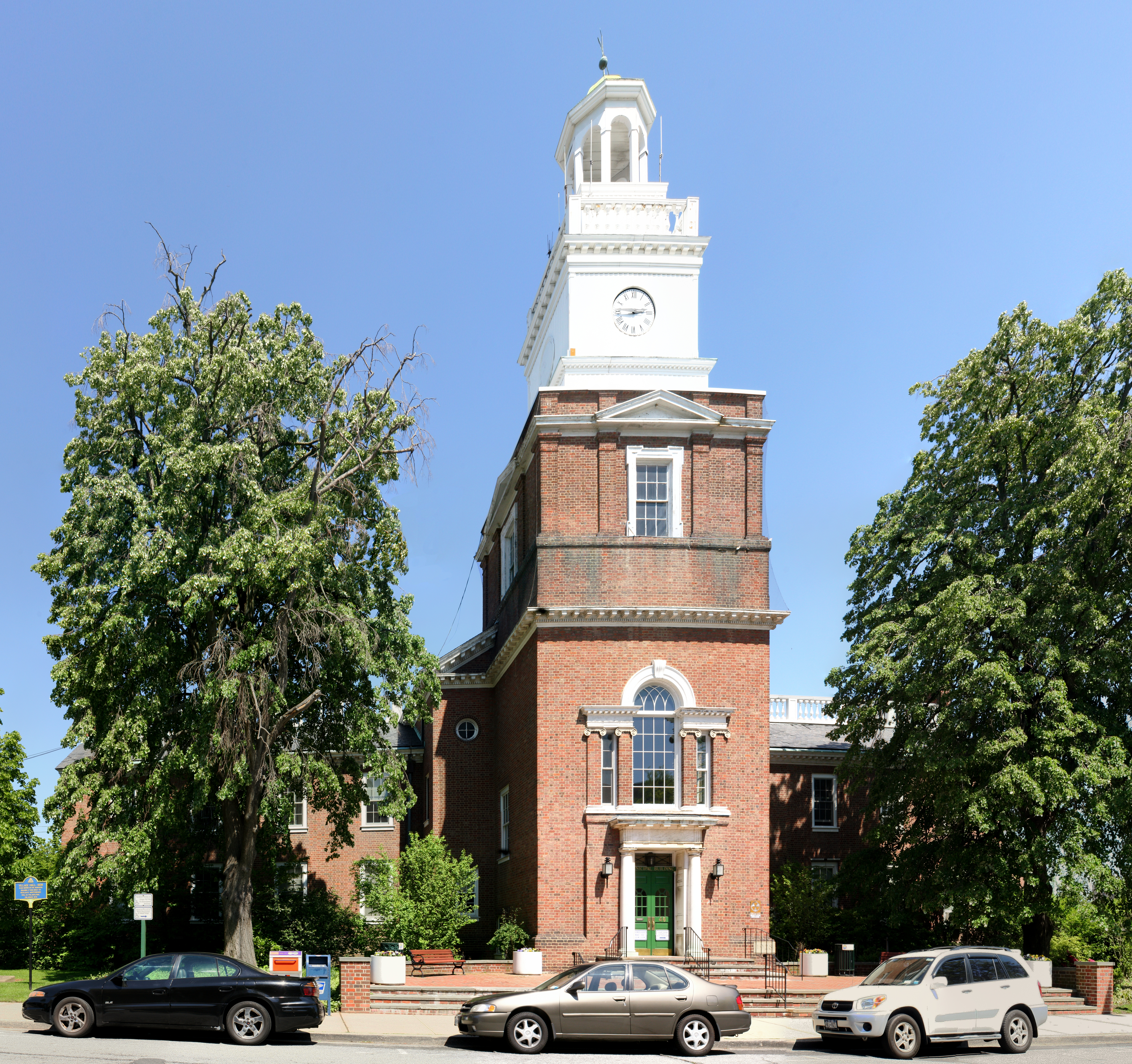
Village Hall (1928), Freeport, New York

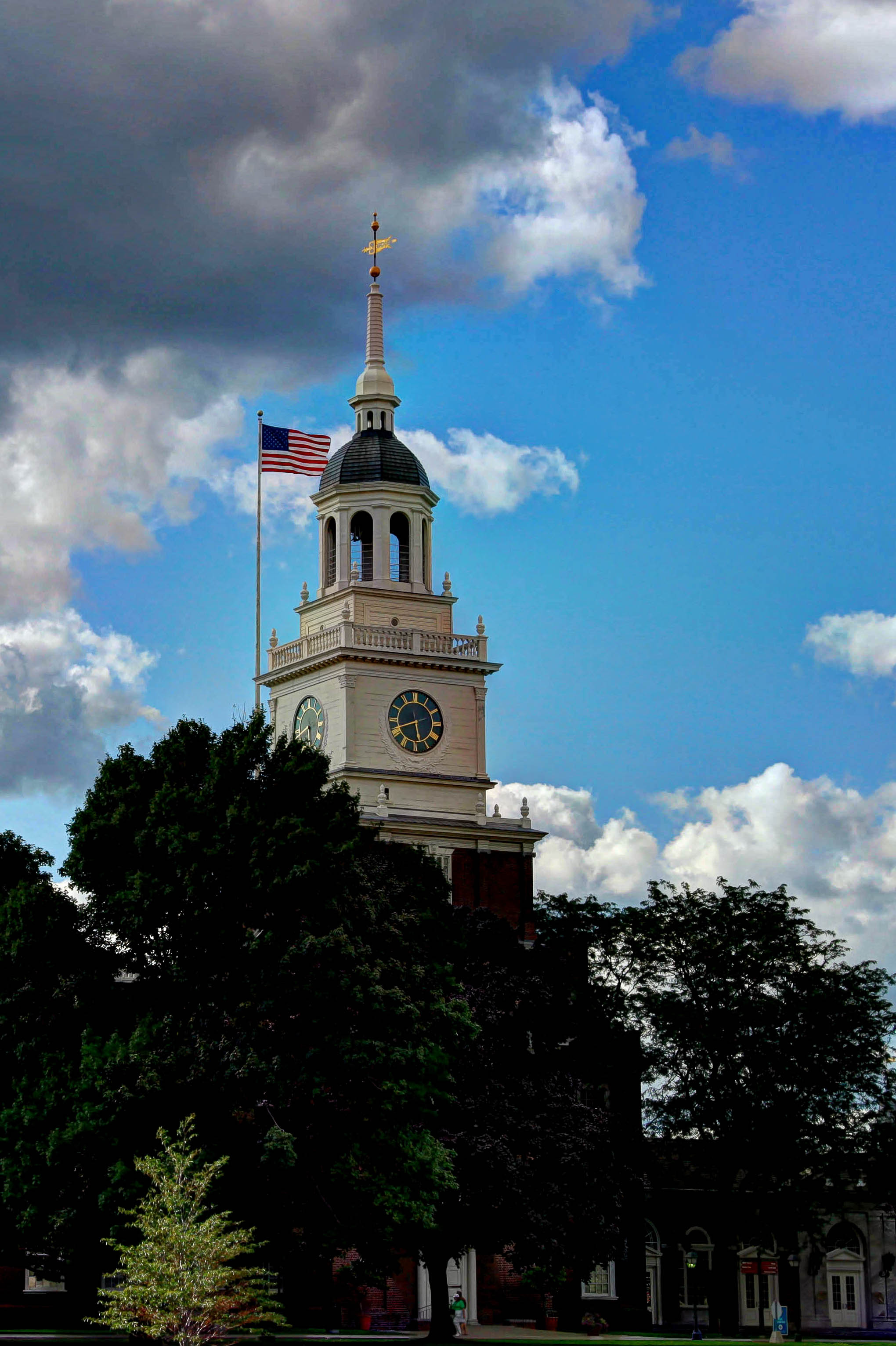
Henry Ford Museum (1929), Dearborn, Michigan

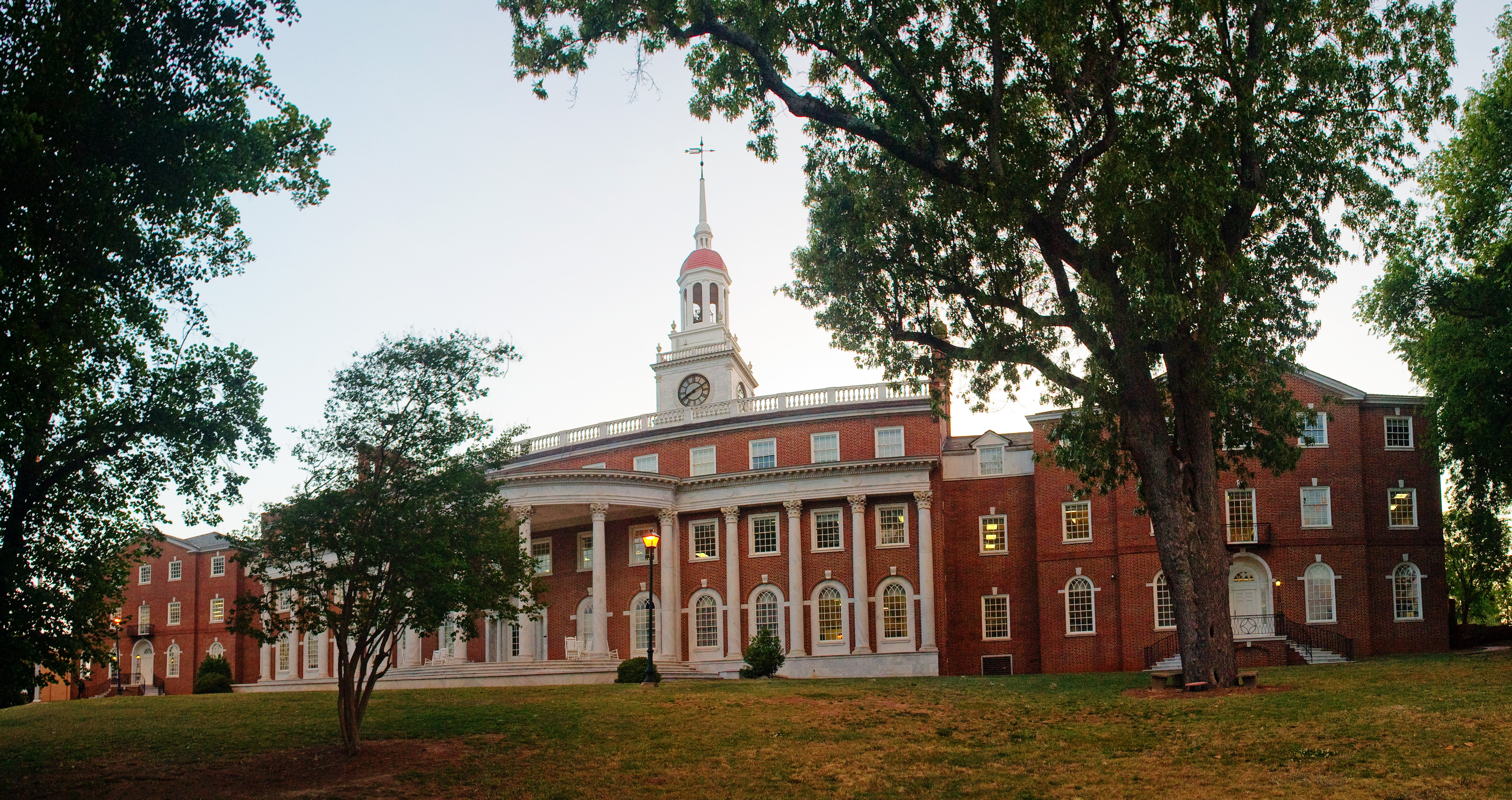
Walter F. George School of Law (1932), Mercer University

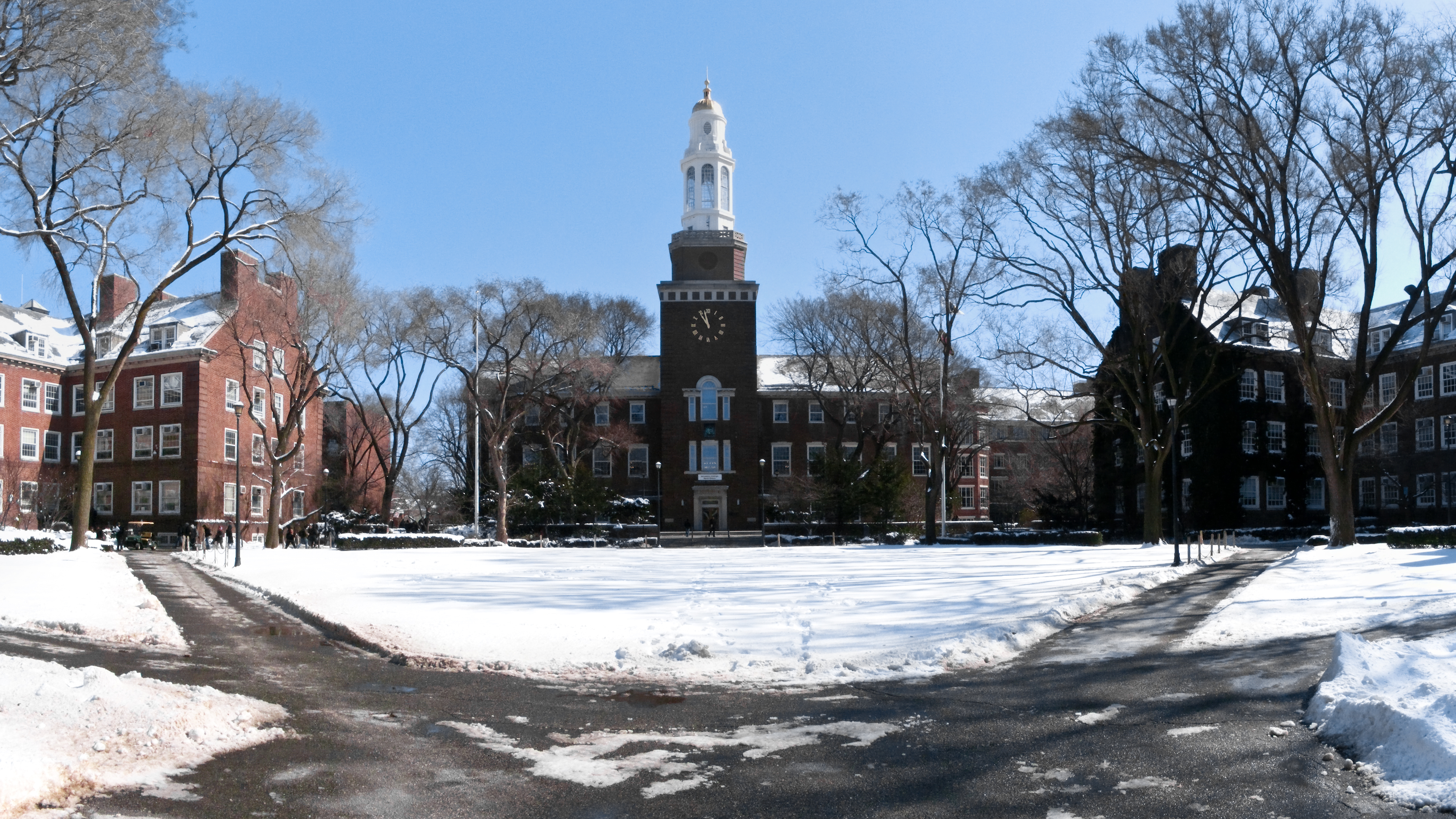
LaGuardia Hall (1936), Brooklyn College

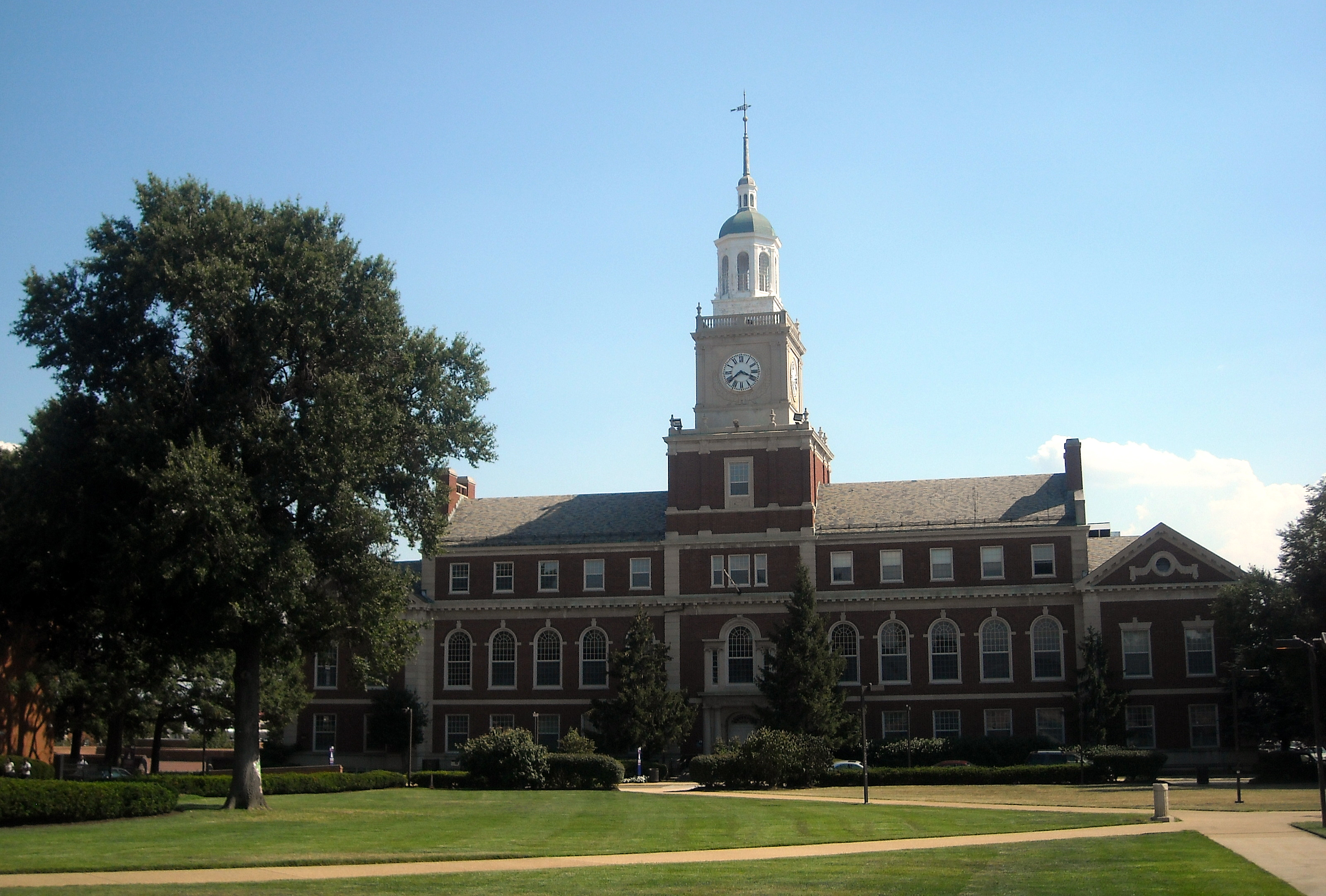
Founders Library (1937), Howard University

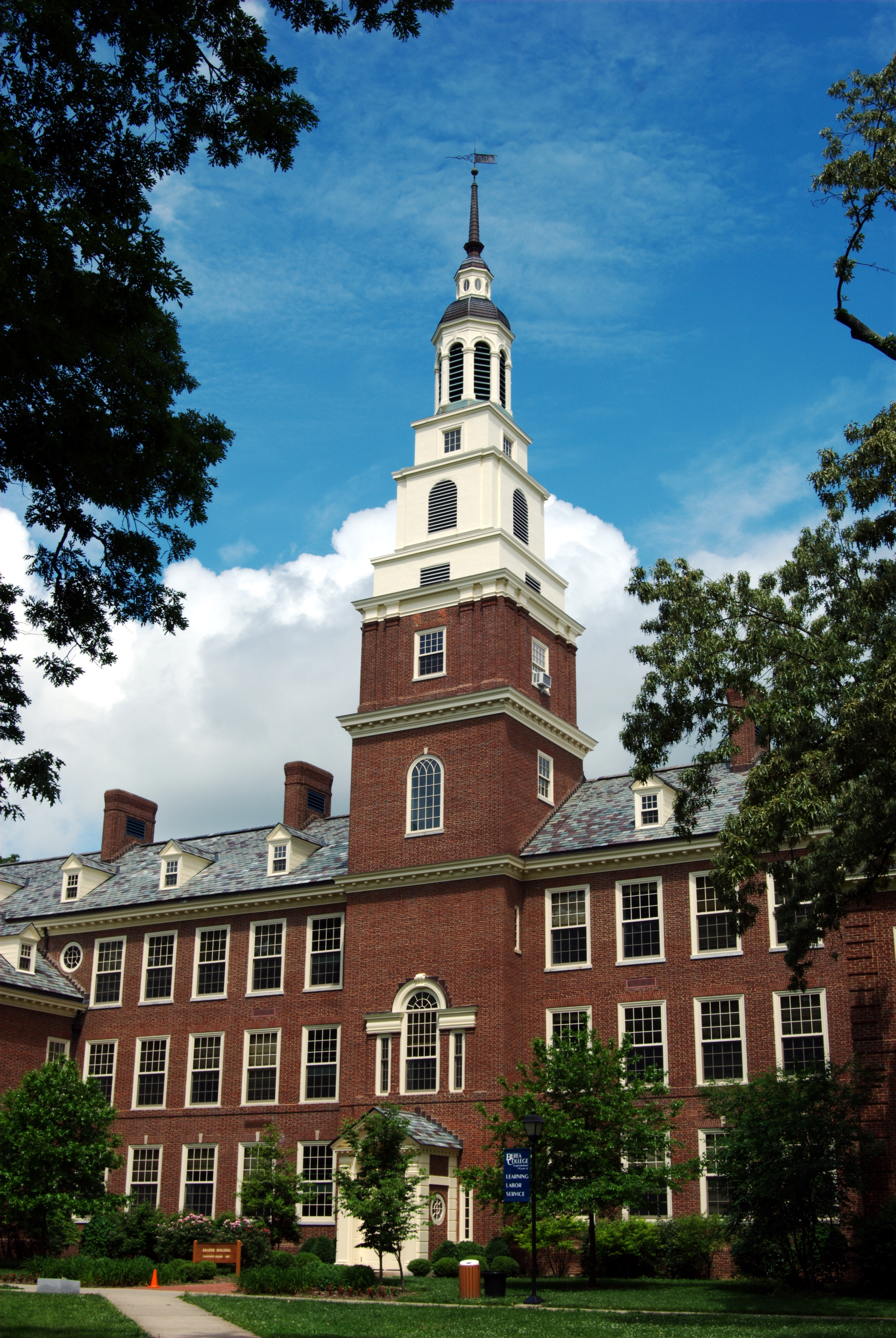
Draper Hall (1938), Berea College

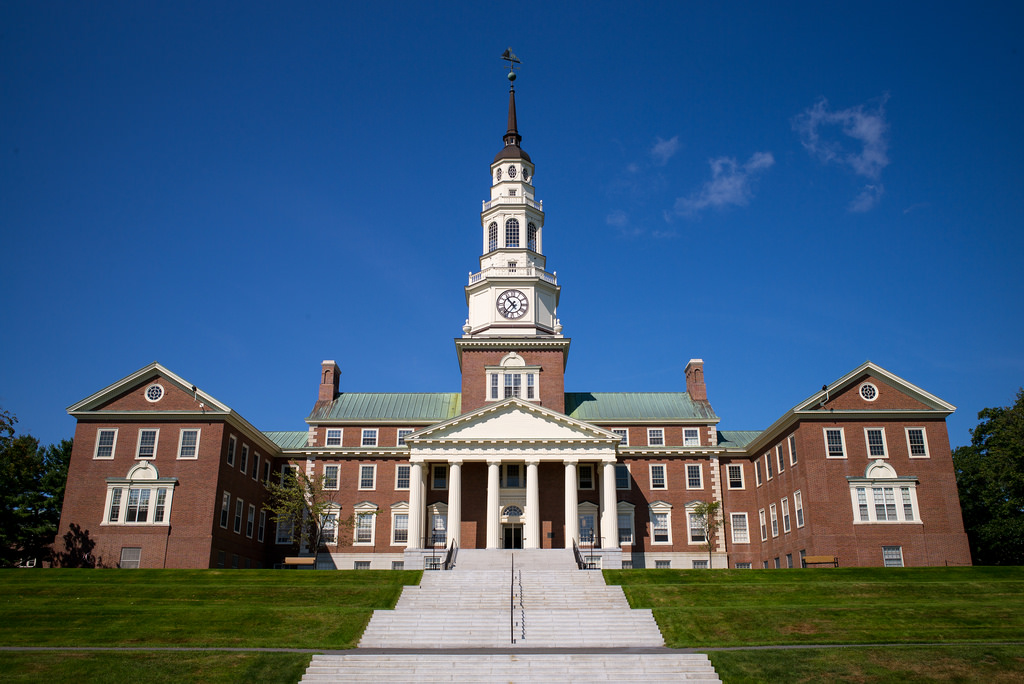
Miller Library (1939), Colby College

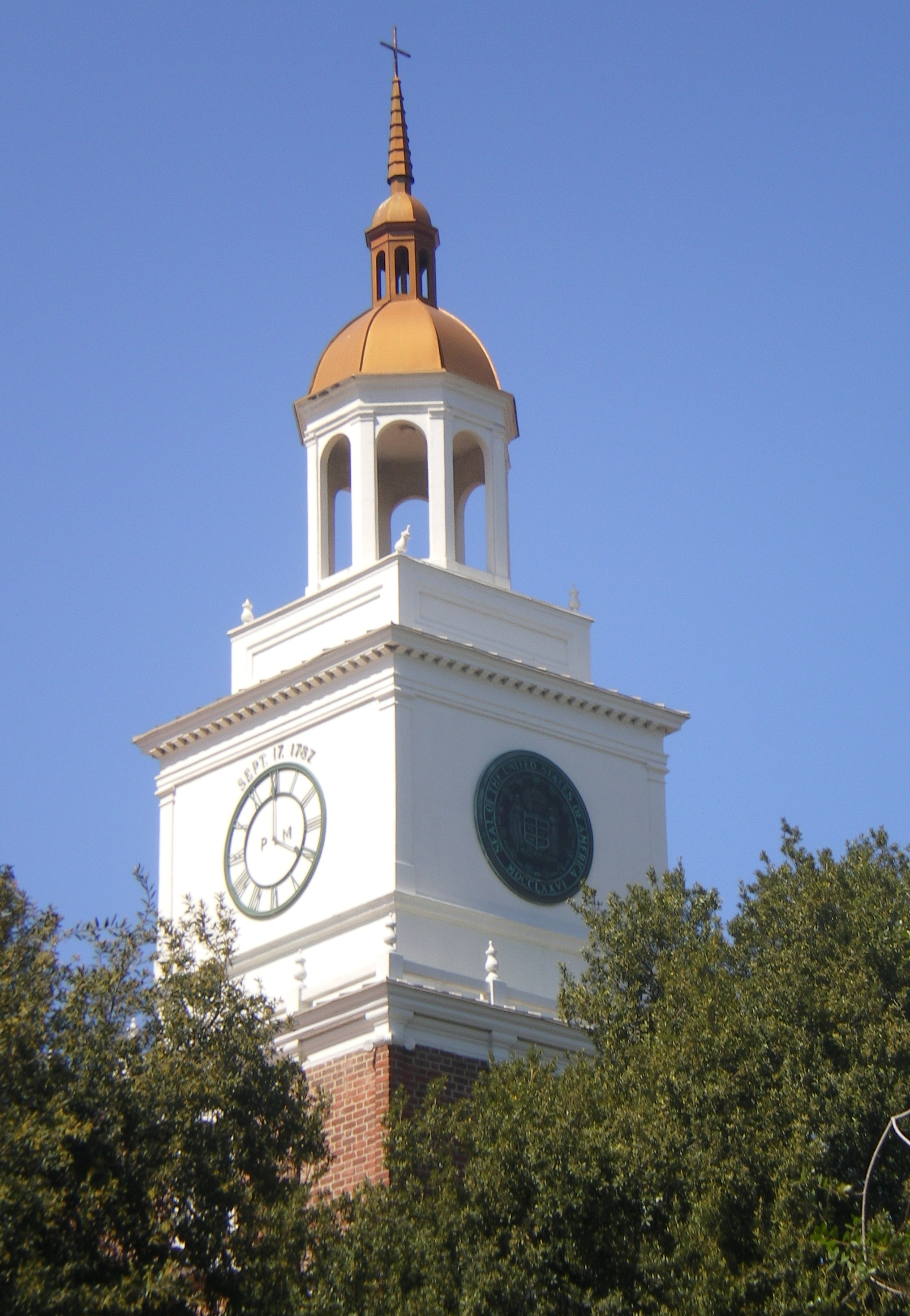
Bellarmine-Jefferson High School (1944), Burbank, California

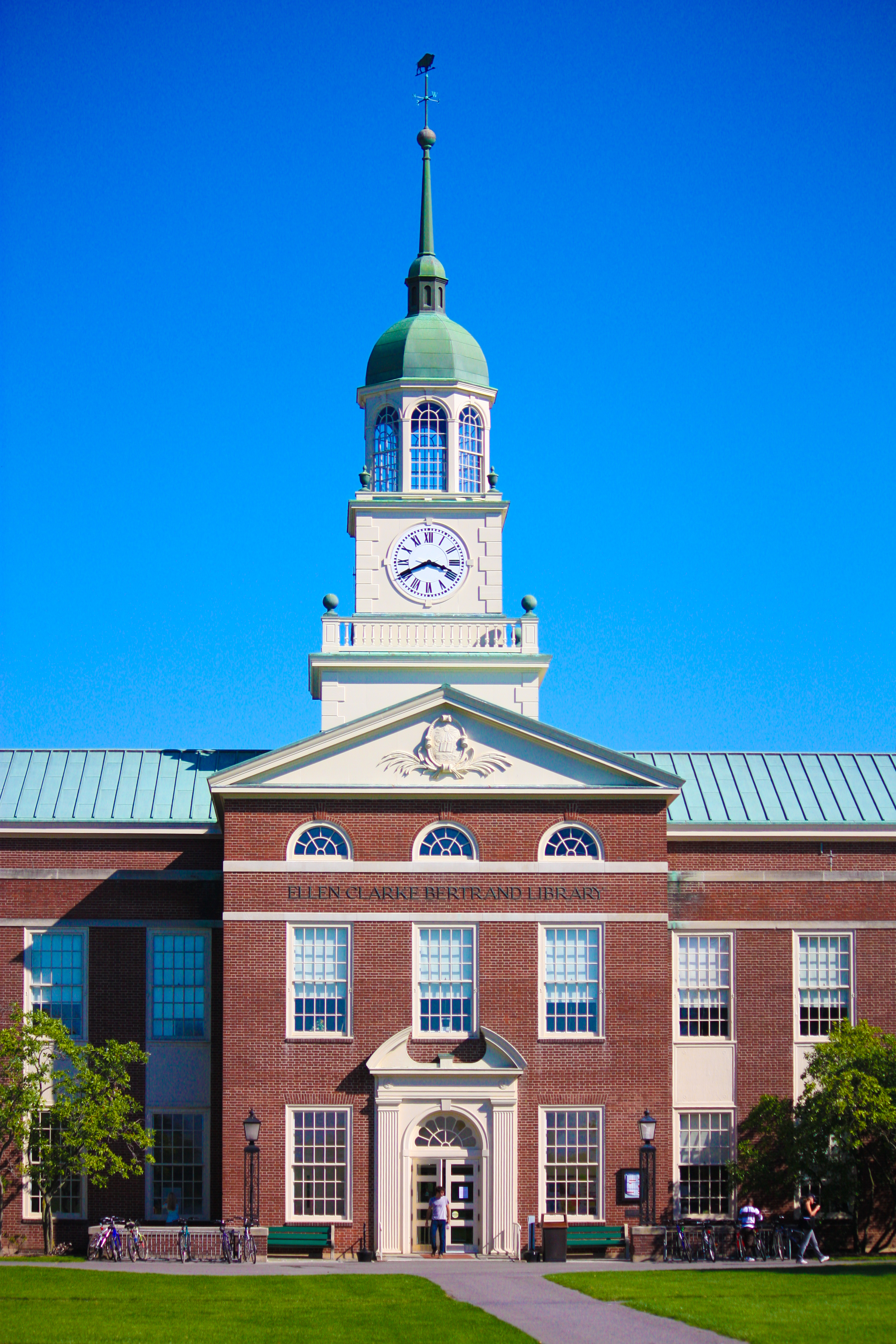
Ellen Clarke Bertrand Library (1951), Bucknell University

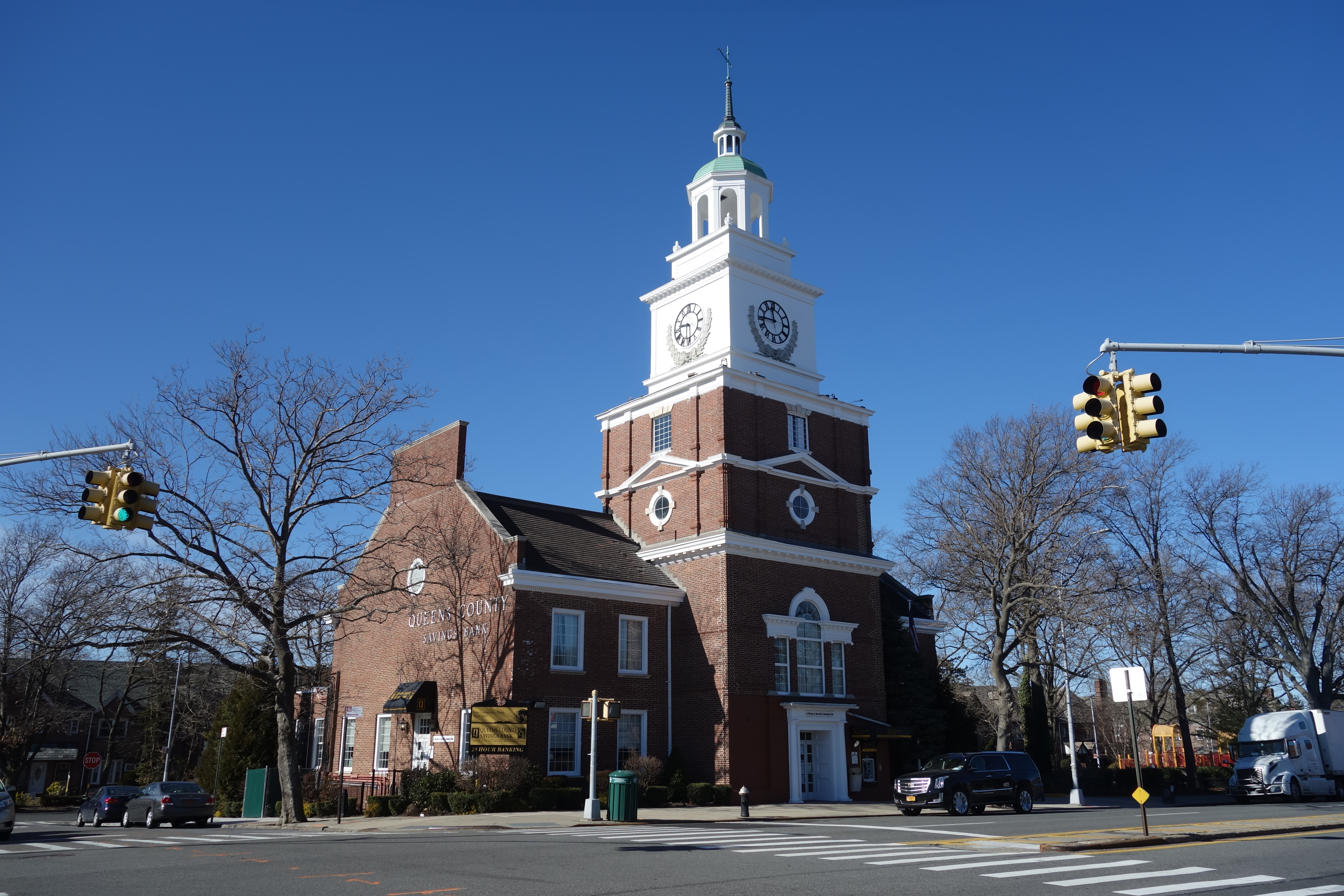
Queens County Savings Bank, Queens, New York City

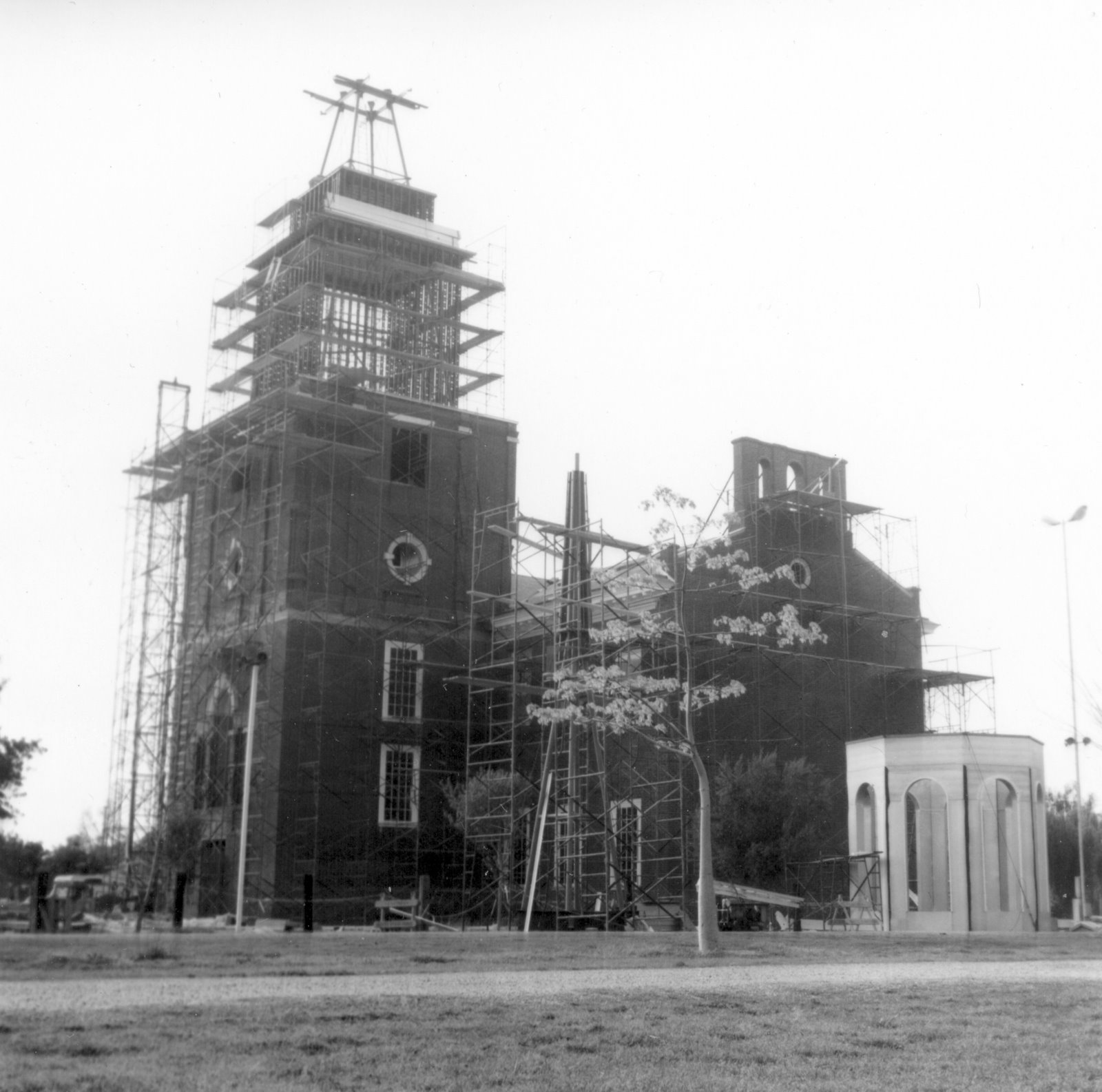
Knott's Berry Farm replica under construction, March 1966

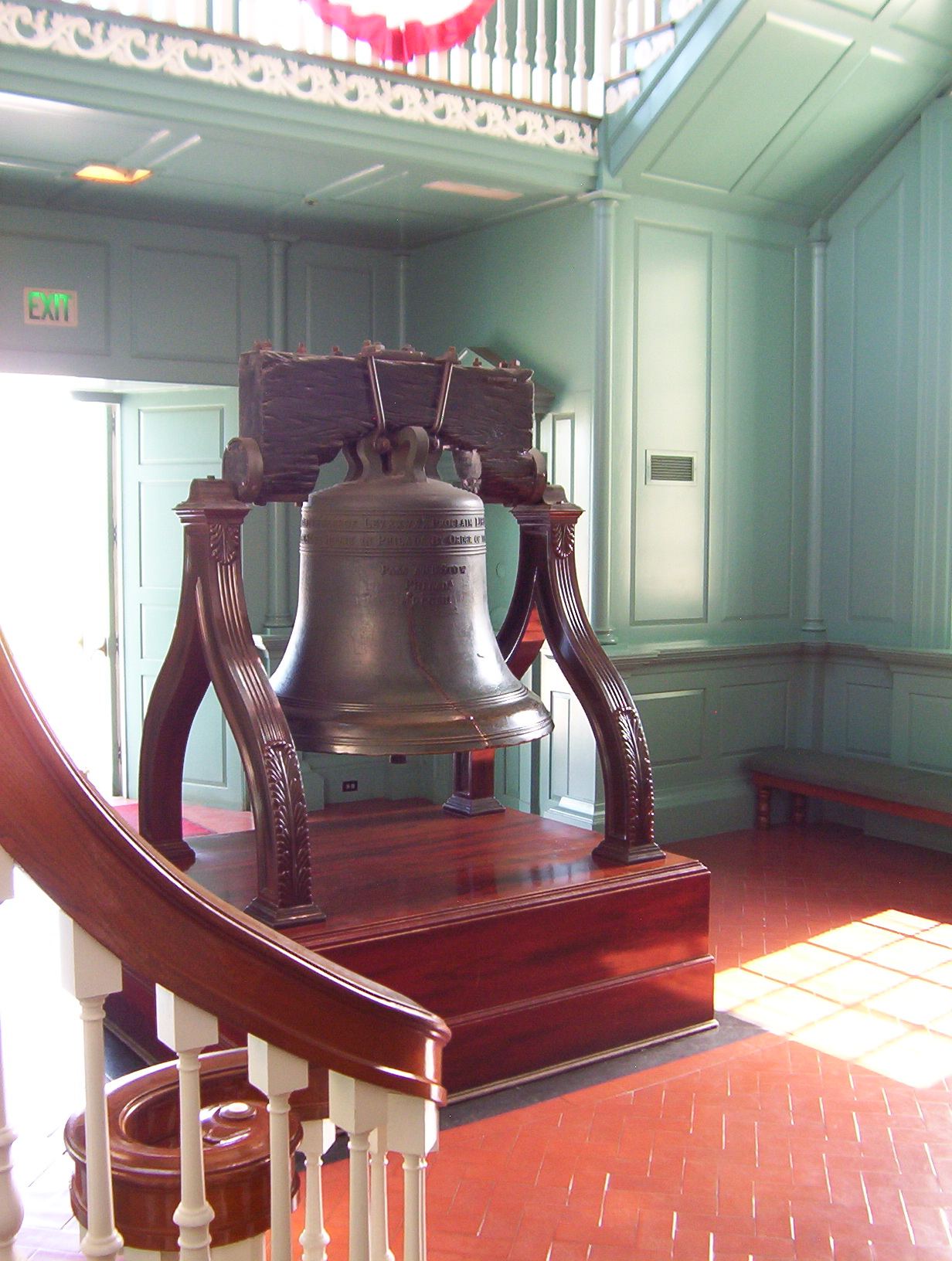
Interior, Knott's Berry Farm (1966), Buena Park, California

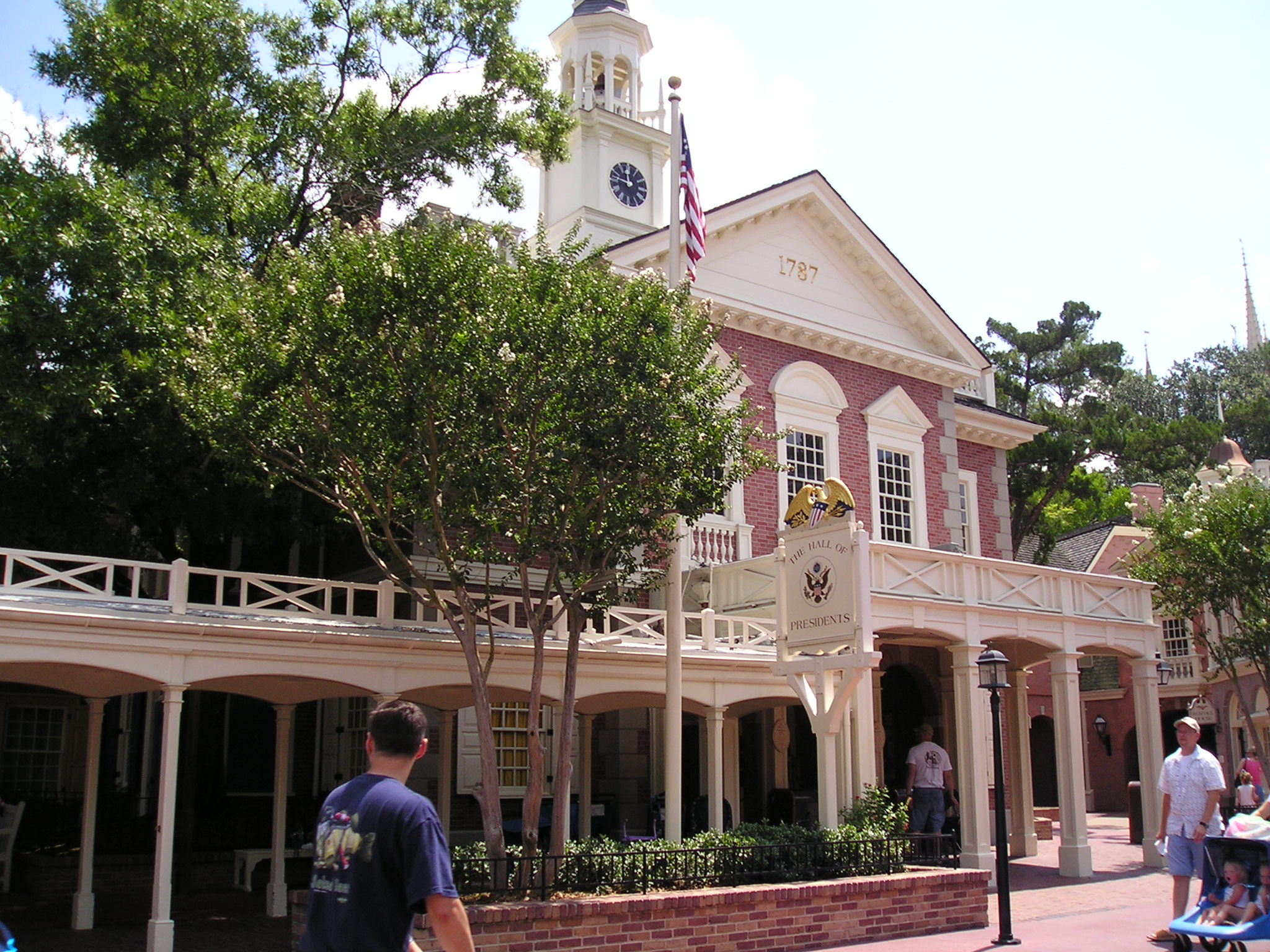
Hall of Presidents (1971), Walt Disney World, Orlando, Florida

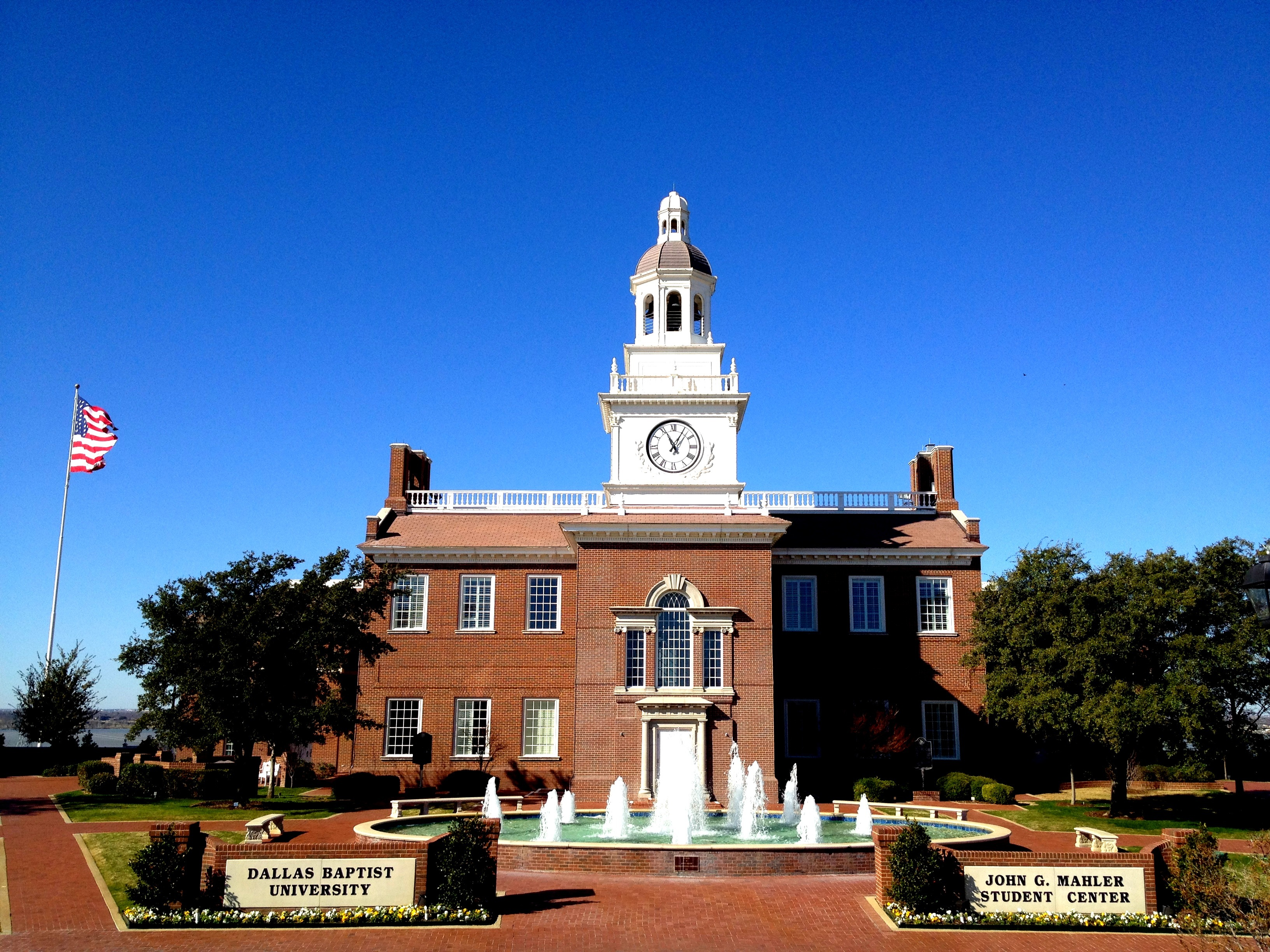
Mahler Student Center (1992), Dallas Baptist University

=== Exposition buildings ===
- Pennsylvania Building (1893, demolished), World's Columbian Exposition, Chicago, Illinois
- Pennsylvania Building (1907), Jamestown Exposition, Norfolk, Virginia. Now part of Naval Station Norfolk
- Pennsylvania Pavilion (1939, demolished), New York World's Fair, Queens, New York City
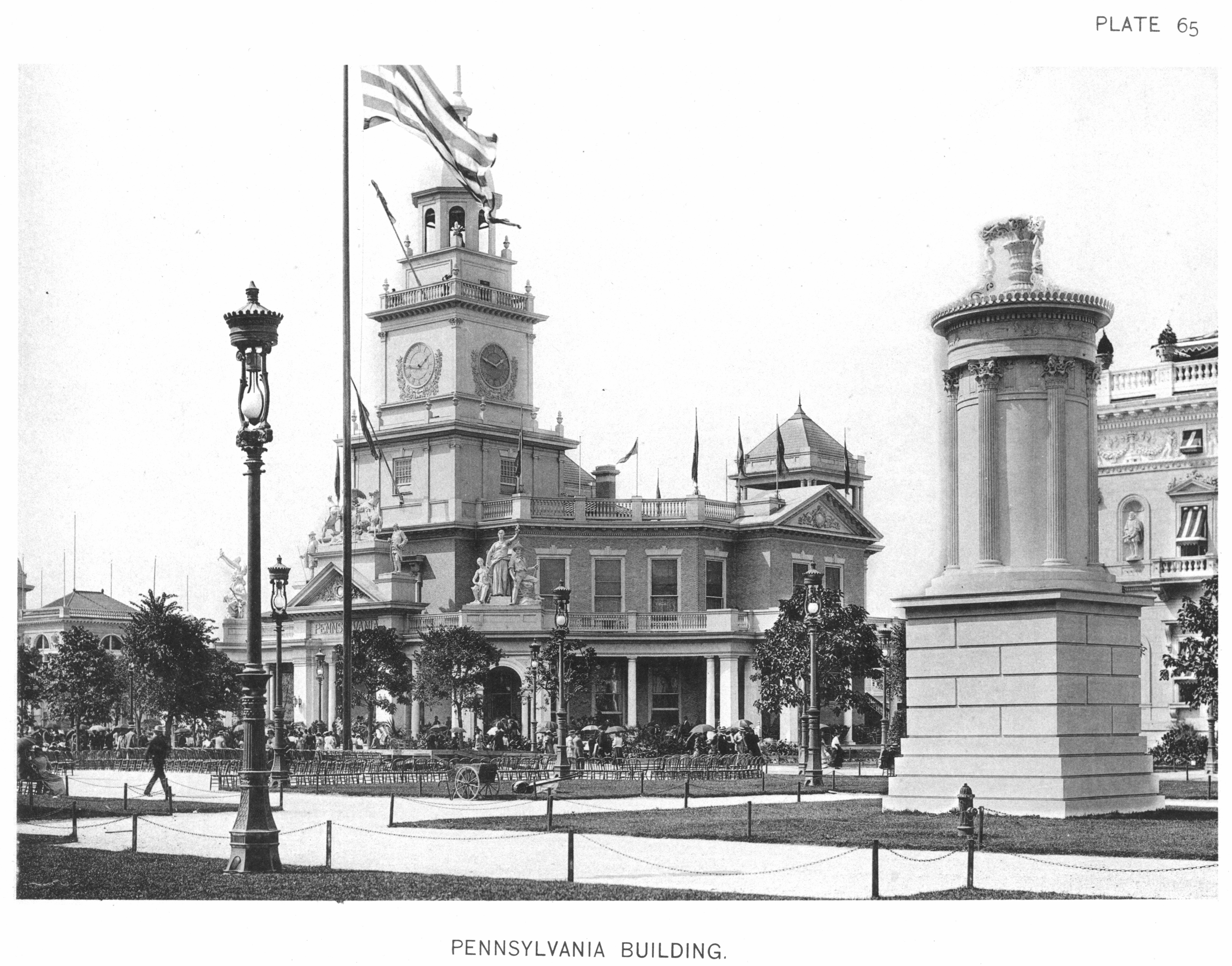
Pennsylvania Building (1893, demolished), 1893 World's Fair, Chicago

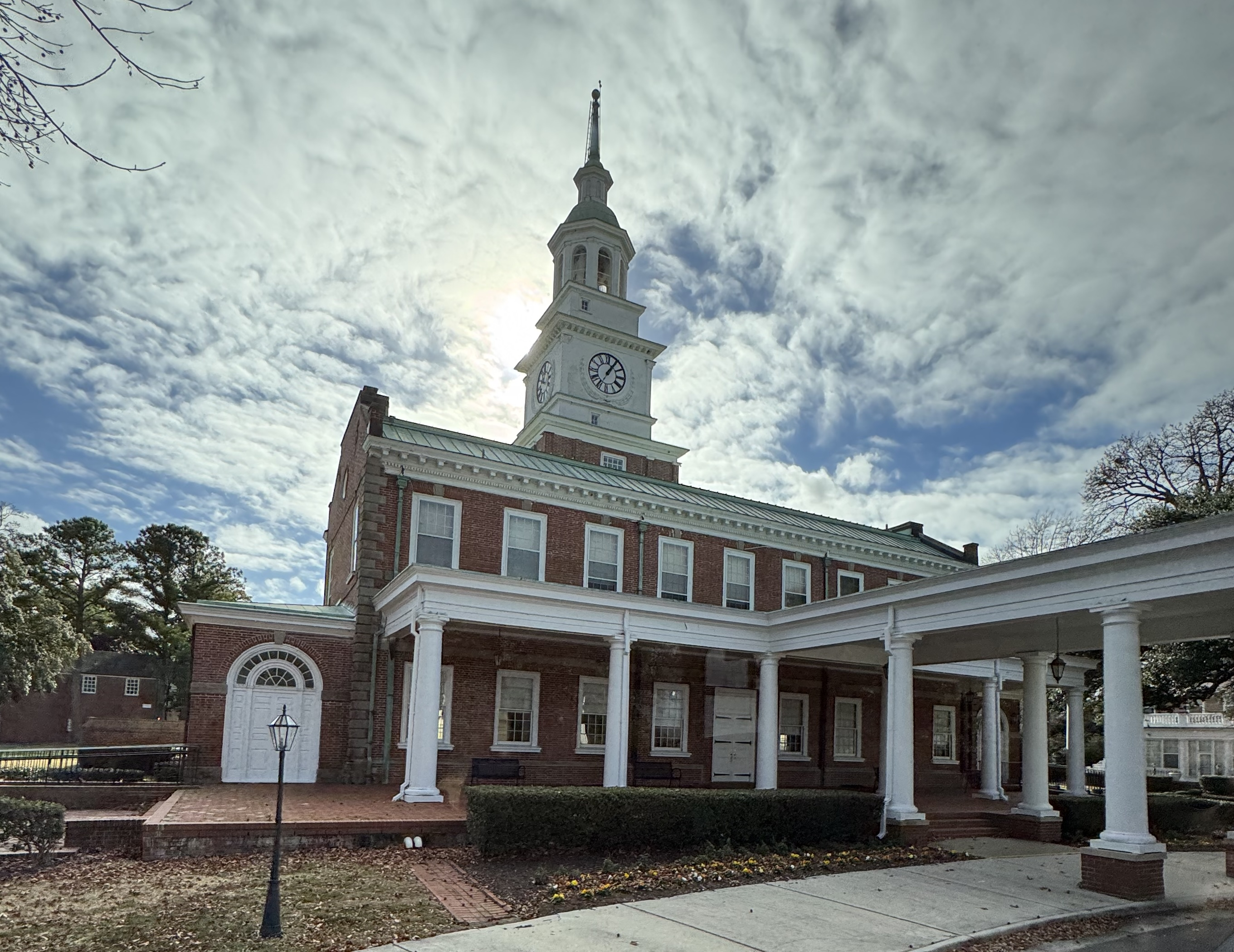
Pennsylvania Building (1907), Jamestown Exposition, Norfolk, Virginia

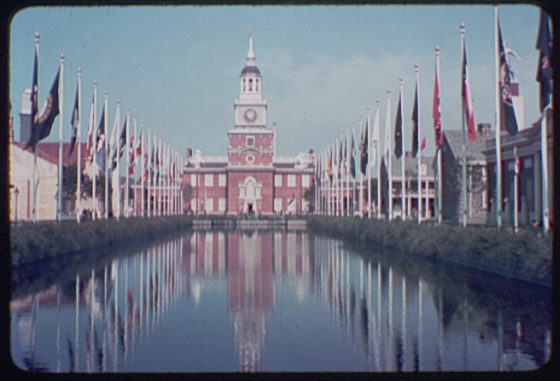
Pennsylvania Pavilion (1939, demolished), 1939 New York World's Fair, Queens, New York City

== Models and miniatures ==
Under the Works Progress Administration, Pennsylvania began the Museum Extension Project, which employed artists, architects, and craftsmen to create exhibits for the state's museums. Among the works produced were highly detailed scale models of historic buildings. In anticipation of the September 1937 sesquicentennial of the U.S. Constitution, 2,600 painted plaster models of Independence Hall were mass-produced and shipped to schools and public buildings across the country.

- Independence Hall scale model (1937, painted plaster, WPA), Lobby, U.S. Supreme Court Building, Washington, D.C.
- Independence Hall 1:25-scale model, Minimundus, Klagenfurt, Austria. Minimundus is a miniature park of architectural models.
- Philly Mini Golf (2006), Franklin Square, 200 N. 6th Street, Philadelphia, Pennsylvania
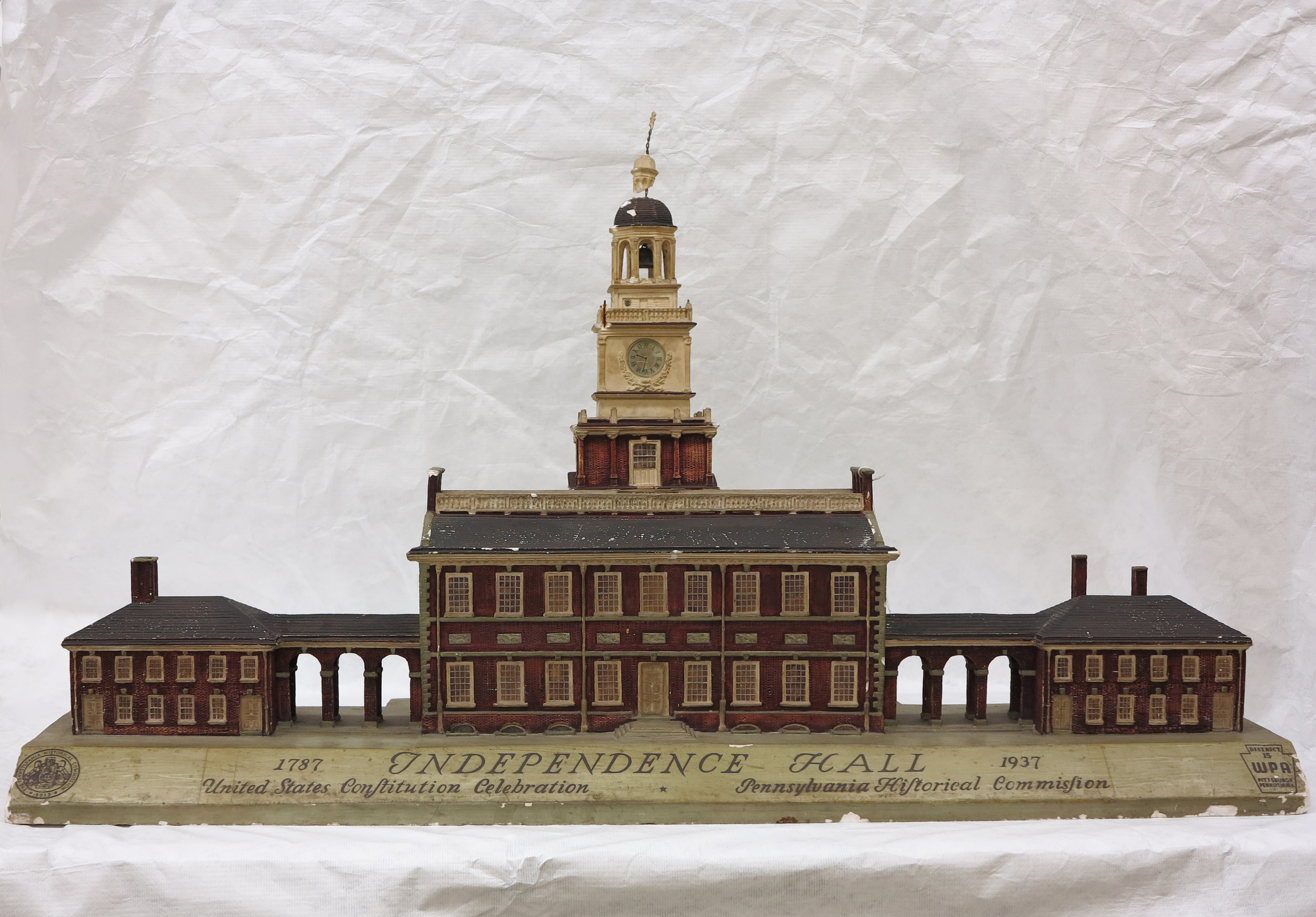
WPA scale model (1937), painted plaster

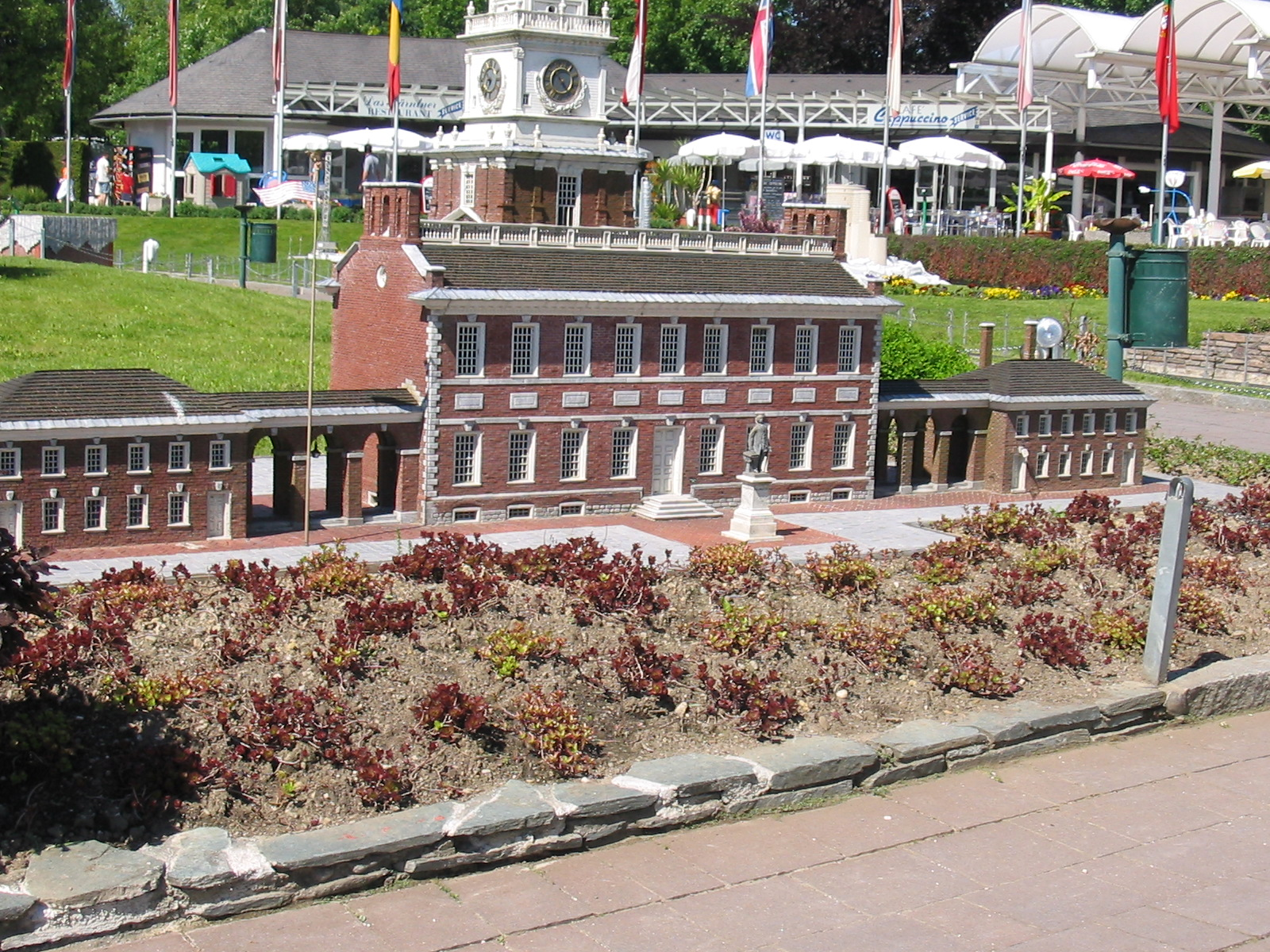
Minimundus, Klagenfurt, Austria, 1994

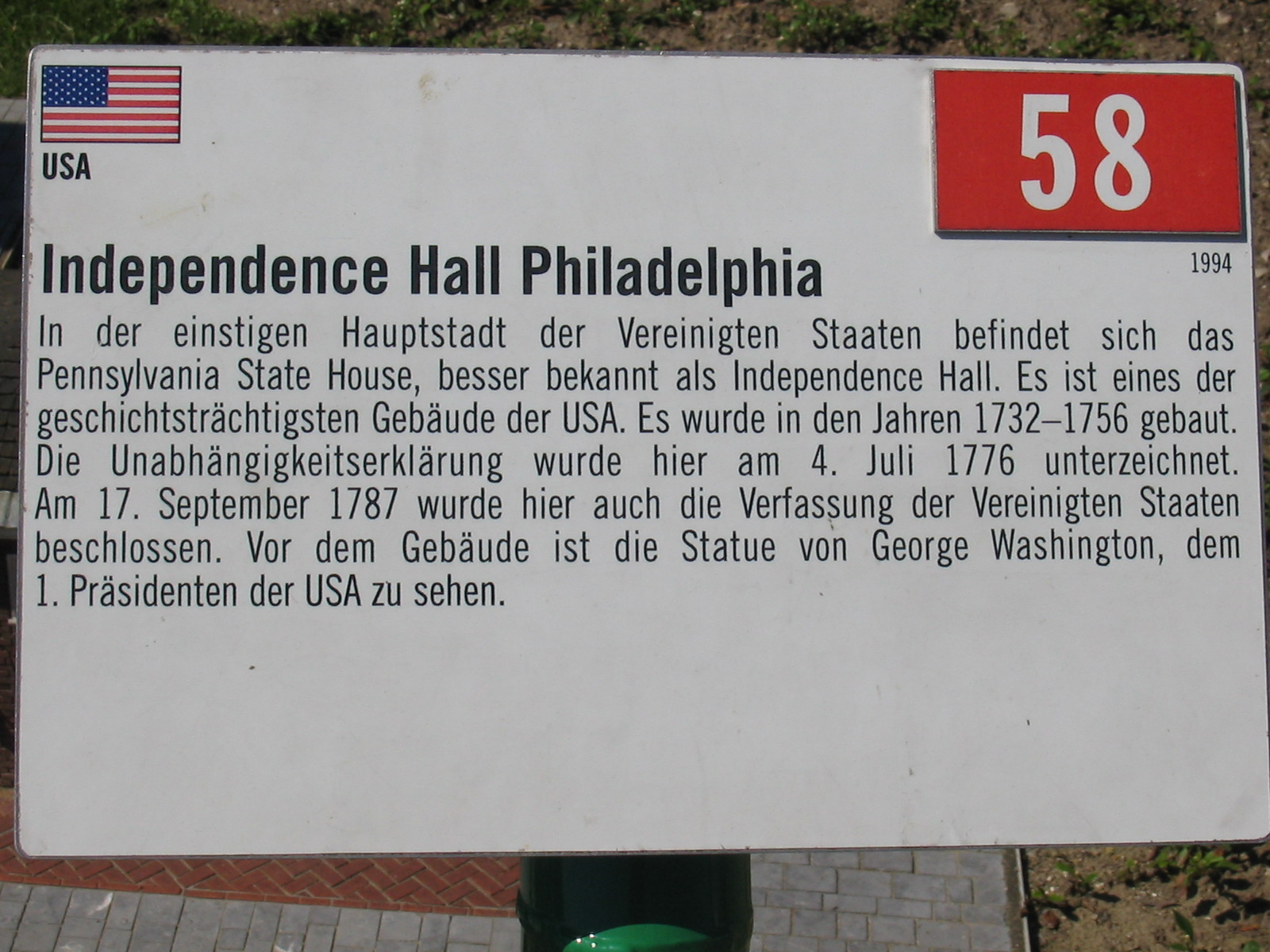
Independence Hall sign at Minimundus (in German)

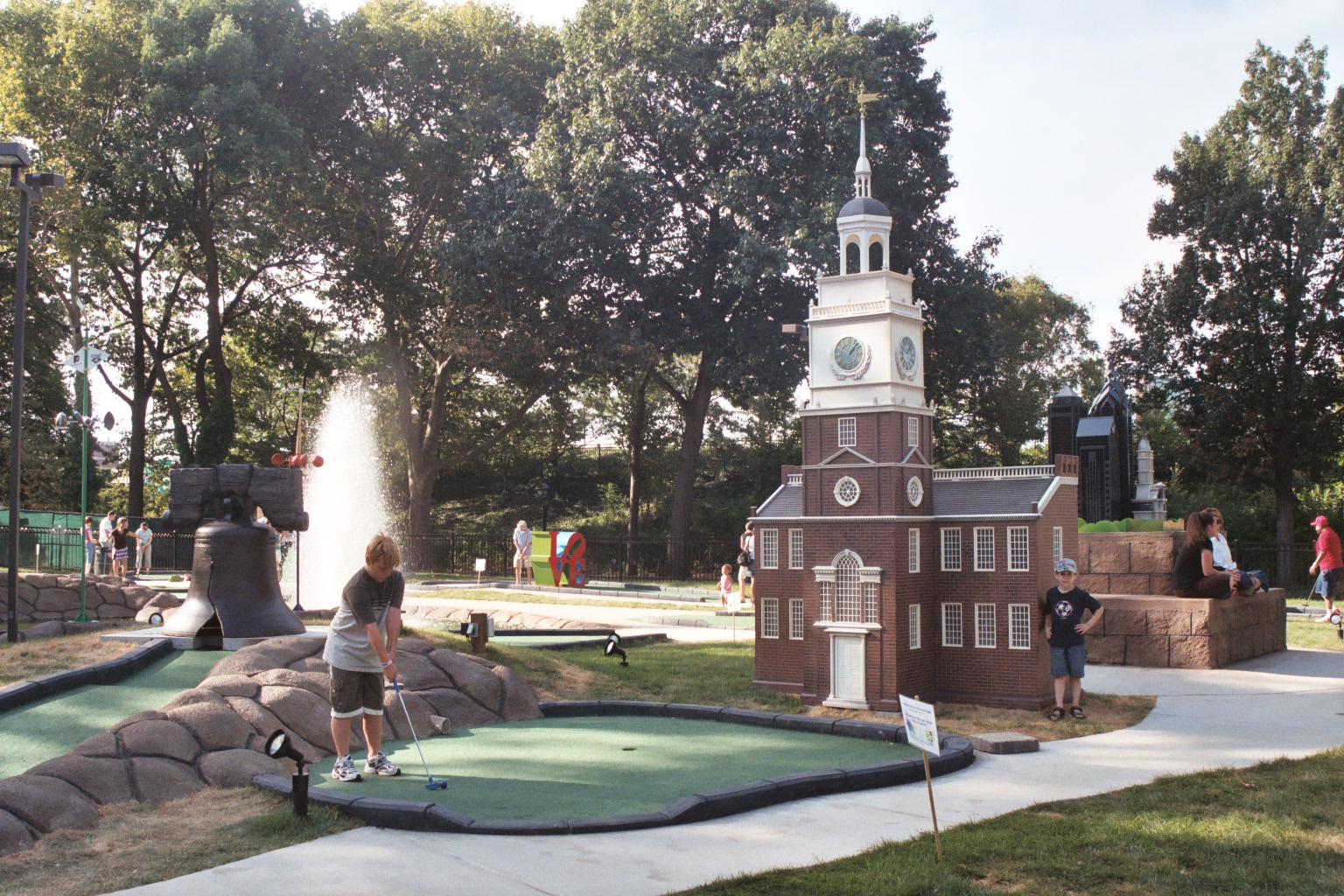
Philly Mini Golf (2006), Franklin Square, Philadelphia, Pennsylvania
