= Miller Library =

Miller Library may refer to:

- U. Grant Miller Library at Washington & Jefferson College
- Miller Library at Colby College
- Henry Miller Memorial Library
- Elisabeth C. Miller Library, a unit of University of Washington Botanic Gardens
- Willis L. Miller Library, a branch of South Georgia Regional Library
