= Colby College Libraries =

Libraries of Colby College in Maine, US

- Location: Colby College, Waterville, Maine, United States

Other information
- Website: Colby College Libraries

The Colby College Libraries are the libraries that support Colby College in Waterville, Maine. The libraries provide access to a merged catalog of more than eight million items via the Colby-Bates-Bowdoin consortium of libraries and MaineCat, with daily courier service from other libraries in Maine. Twelve professional librarians provide research assistance to students, faculty, and outside researchers. Instruction in the use of the library and its research materials is offered throughout the curriculum, from an introduction in beginning English classes to in-depth subject searching using sophisticated tools in upper-level classes.

== Miller Library ==
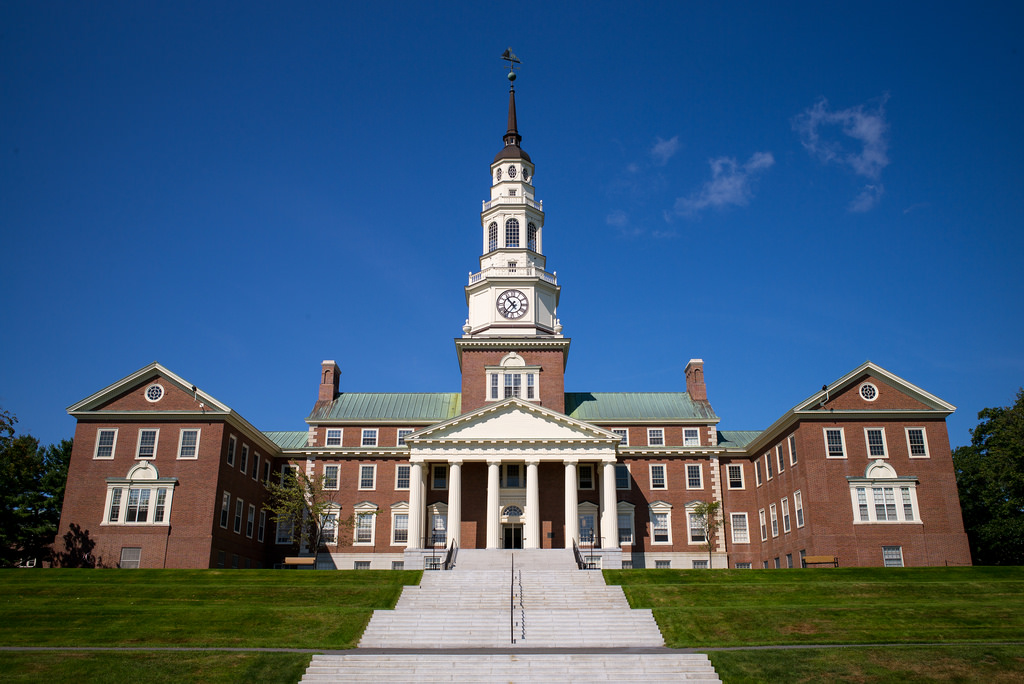
Miller Library, Colby College

Miller Library is Colby's main library, which stands at the center of campus. Designed by Jens Fredrick Larson of the firm Larson & Wells and modeled after the Baker Memorial Library at Dartmouth College (which was, in turn, inspired by Independence Hall in Philadelphia), Miller was built in 1939 and named for the parents of Merton L. Miller (class of 1890); an addition that doubled the size of the original building was opened in 1983. Miller Library houses the humanities and social science collections, study rooms that are open 24 hours, a computer lab, the college archives, and Special Collections. Miller also contains a computer cluster and study areas that are open around the clock, and is equipped with wireless Internet access.

An open-stack system allows access to the collection with the online catalog and electronic indexes and Internet files are available on library workstations and computers campus-wide. The collection supports all curriculum areas and contains more than 600 currently received print journals, more than 47,000 electronic journals, and domestic and international daily newspapers. The Colby libraries are a repository for U.S. government and Maine state documents.

Colby College's Miller Library became the center of a national controversy when more than half the collection was transferred to storage in fall 2014. Lack of faculty consultation was documented in "Talking Points" unearthed by student journalist Nick Merrill of The Colby Echo. Articles were written against the renovation in Slate, The New Criterion, The Chronicle of Higher Education, and Colby Faculty published an open letter against the new Miller Library, the Colby administration's dismissal of professor's concerns, and the burdens to teaching and research that resulted. An original story by Matt Hongoltz-Hetling in The mid-Maine Morning Sentinel and the Portland Press Herald was carried by Publishers Weekly and the Associated Press, appearing throughout major newspapers in the United States. Miller became a national example of the "Endangered Library," and critics were quick to see the parallel with the New York Public Library plan to send a large part of its collection to storage: a plan reversed in 2014 shortly after the Colby Library controversy. According to the blog "Annoyed Librarian" published in the Library Journal, "the only person supporting this is the library director. The faculty and students are all protesting". On July 15, 2014, two-time Pulitzer Prize–winning historian and Colby alumnus Alan Taylor wrote a letter to new Colby President David Greene protesting the "substituting office space for texts" in the Colby Library and the exclusion of faculty input in the renovation process.

=== Special Collections ===
The Charter of Colby College, on display in Miller Library's Colbiana Collection.

The Miller Special Collections Library houses the college's collection of rare books, first editions, manuscripts, correspondence, diaries, scrapbooks, photographic materials, and the college archive. It has achieved international recognition, with some pieces dating back to the 15th century.

The Edwin Arlington Robinson Memorial Room, named for the Pulitzer Prize-winning Maine poet, contains his books, manuscripts, letters, and memorabilia. Colby's Thomas Hardy Collection is one of the most extensive in the country. Other authors represented in the Robinson Room include A. E. Housman, Sarah Orne Jewett, Kenneth Roberts, Henry James, Pulitzer Prize winning author Willa Cather, Poet Laureate of the United Kingdom John Masefield, William Dean Howells, and Thomas Mann. In 2006, the college acquired the personal papers of Wesley McNair, which extends over 200 linear feet, and includes his writings from elementary school, high school, and graduate school, drafts, manuscripts, and teaching notes.

The James Augustine Healy Collection of Modern Irish Literature contains over 7,000 primary and critical sources representing the Irish Literary Revival. It includes inscribed copies, manuscripts, and holograph letters of William Butler Yeats, items from the Cuala Press, and works from authors including Seán O'Casey, James Joyce, George Bernard Shaw, and others. It also includes the James Brendan Connolly collection.

The Pestana Collection of World War I materials comprises 4,000 books, magazines, audio and visual recordings, artifacts, and memorabilia, primarily documenting the experience of the Western Front. Items such as postwar commentaries, memoirs, poetry, fiction, children's books, handwritten letters and journals, videotape recordings, as well as audio and phonograph recordings. The collection also includes historical artifacts including rifles, helmets, hood gas masks, art items such as magazines, posters, photographs and postcards.

The Celia Thaxter collection contains Thaxter's letters, poems, prose fragments, an unfinished novel, scrapbooks, and first appearances in print. The Vernon Lee collection contains first editions, over 1000 letters, 136 manuscripts and articles, 117 photographs, and a small number of personal documents and artifacts from the author. Other collections contain various items relating to Waldo Peirce, Bern Porter '32, and Booth Tarkington, amongst others.

The Alfred King Chapman room serves as the depository for the Colby College Archives, known as the "Colbiana Collection". The collection of historical records from 1813 to present includes administrative and curricular policy documents, information on student life and customs and Senior Scholar/Honors theses. There are also complete runs of the Board of Trustees minutes, The Colby Echo (student newspaper), Colby magazine (alumni publication), the Oracle (student yearbook), and an extensive collection of books by Colby graduates and faculty members.

== Bixler Art and Music Library ==
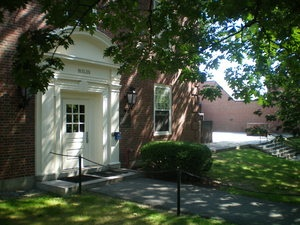
Bixler Art and Music Center

The Art and Music Library, in the Bixler Art and Music Center, maintains a collection of art and music books, journals, sound recordings, music scores, a computer lab/listening center, and study spaces. Internet ports and wireless access are provided. The library contains approximately 2,200 reference volumes, 10,000 scores, 30,000 monographs, 11,000 sound recordings, and 1,200 videos.

== Olin Science Library ==
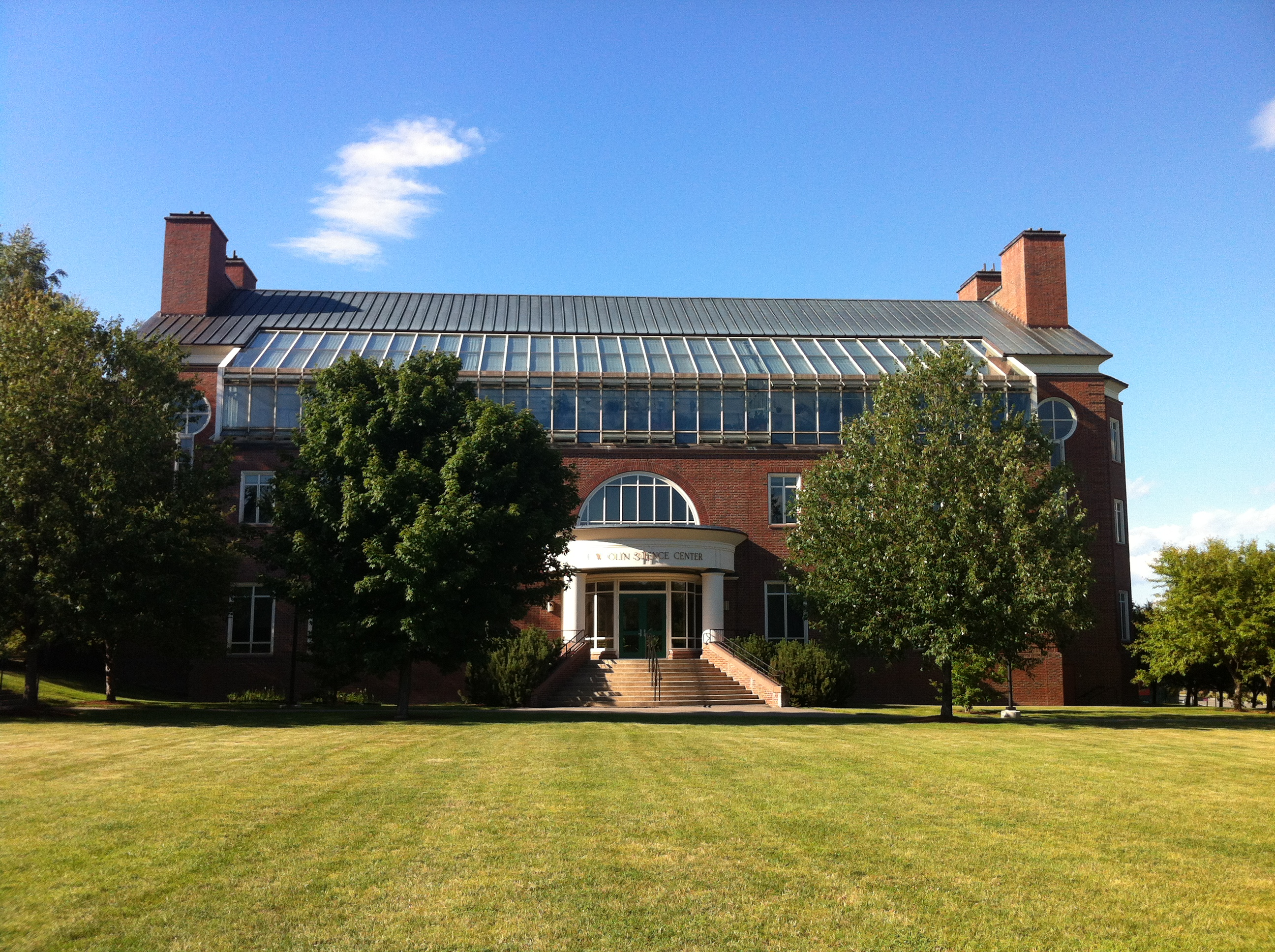
Olin Science Center

The 10,800-square-foot Science Library, in the F.W. Olin Science Center, housed books, journals, videos, and topographic maps that supported programs in the natural sciences, computer science, and mathematics. In 2022 the Olin Science Library was transformed into offices for President Greene's Artificial Intelligence and Entrepreneurship initiatives as well study spaces. The books once housed by the Olin Science Library are in an off-campus annex and can be requested for delivery.

== See also ==
- List of Colby College Buildings
