= Jens Fredrick Larson =

American pilot and architect (1891–1981)

- Born: August 10, 1891; Waltham, Massachusetts
- Died: May 6, 1981 (aged 89); Winston-Salem, North Carolina
- Burial place: Dalton Memorial Garden, Winston-Salem, North Carolina
- Military career
- Allegiance: United States
- Branch: Royal Air Force (United Kingdom)
- Units: Royal Air Force: No. 8 Squadron RAF; No. 34 Squadron RAF; No. 84 Squadron RAF
- Conflicts: World War I

Jens Fredrick Larson (10 August 1891 – 6 May 1981), sometimes credited as Jens Frederick Larson, was an American pilot and architect known for designing several Colonial Revival style college campuses: Dartmouth College, Bucknell University, Colby College, Wake Forest University, and others. He served as pursuit pilot and a flying ace in World War I.

== Early life ==
Born in Waltham, Massachusetts in 1891, the son of a Swedish immigrant, Larson worked at a Boston architecture firm and then won a scholarship to the Harvard architecture school, where he studied from 1910 to 1912, and where Harvard's Colonial/Georgian style campus may have influenced Larson's preferred architectural style. After Harvard, he worked for the architectural firm Brown & Vallance in Montreal. During this time he spent about a year in Great Britain, where he apprenticed with Sir John James Burnet in Glasgow and then with Thomas Edward Collcutt in London, and then returned to Montreal.

== Military service ==
After the outbreak of World War I, Larson joined the Canadian Army, where he was known as "Swede". After service with the field artillery for nineteen months, he transferred to the Royal Flying Corps on 19 October 1916. He served with the 24 and 34 Training Squadrons. On 31 July 1917, he became one of the original pilots of No. 84 Squadron, equipped with SE-5s. He earned nine official victories, the last of which was an LVG twin-seater which crashed inside Allied lines after he knocked out the observer. Larson was hospitalized in 1918 and did not see any further combat service.

== Architecture ==
Larson returned to Canada in January 1919 before making his home in Hanover, New Hampshire, where he was architect in residence at the Ivy League school Dartmouth College from 1919 to 1947. According to scholar Rod Andrew Miller, Larson's 1928 Baker Memorial Library at Dartmouth "garnered much attention"; Miller quoted a June 1930 letter to Larson from Princeton University librarian James T. Gerould that said: "The longer I study the Dartmouth building the more thoroughly convinced I am that, in its adaptation to purpose, it is the best building we have in the country." Larson's work was part of the architecture event in the art competition at the 1932 Summer Olympics. He became a member of the Association of American Colleges Commission on College Architecture, and in 1933 he coauthored with Archie Palmer the book Architectural Planning of the American College. In the 1930s he redesigned the campuses of the Little Ivy schools Bucknell University and Colby College. He was awarded the Legion of Honour in France for his design of the Maison Internationale at the Cité Internationale Universitaire de Paris, which opened in 1936. Among other projects, he designed buildings for the Institute for Advanced Study, Lehigh University, University of Louisville, and St. Francis Xavier University. He completed a full design for the University of Louisville, but the project was quashed in part due to World War II. He eventually settled in North Carolina, where he designed the new Wake Forest College campus in Winston-Salem, North Carolina, and he retired in 1971. He died in Winston-Salem on 6 May 1981.

Other architects that Larson respected included Ralph Adams Cram and Charles A. Platt.

=== Gallery ===
For more than fifty years, Jens Fredrick Larson designed almost exclusively in Colonial Revival style before and during the period when the extremely different mid-century modern architecture was rising in popularity. Several of his buildings echo the structure of Independence Hall in Philadelphia (see also Independence Hall replicas and derivatives).

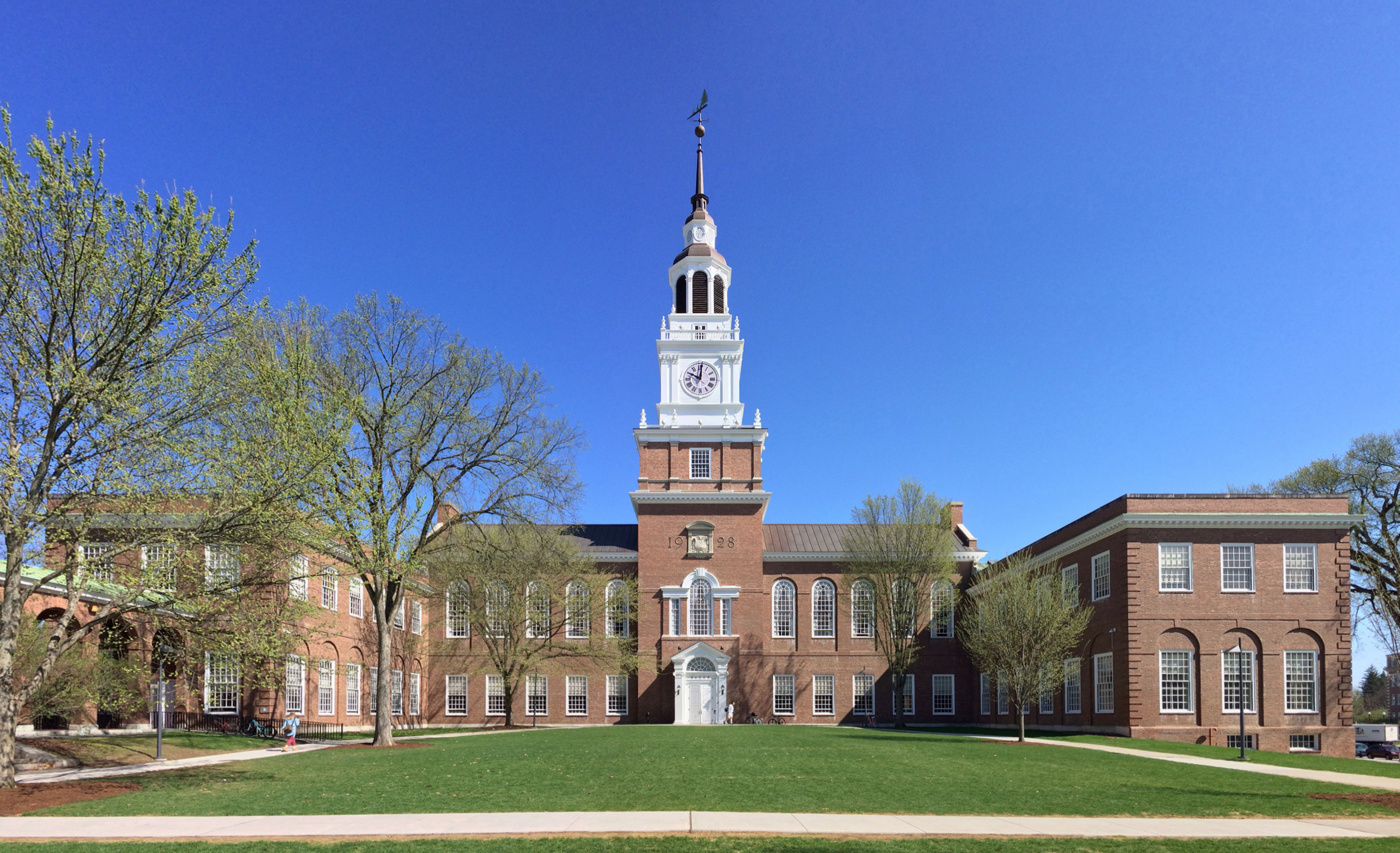
Baker Memorial Library at Dartmouth College, building opened 1928

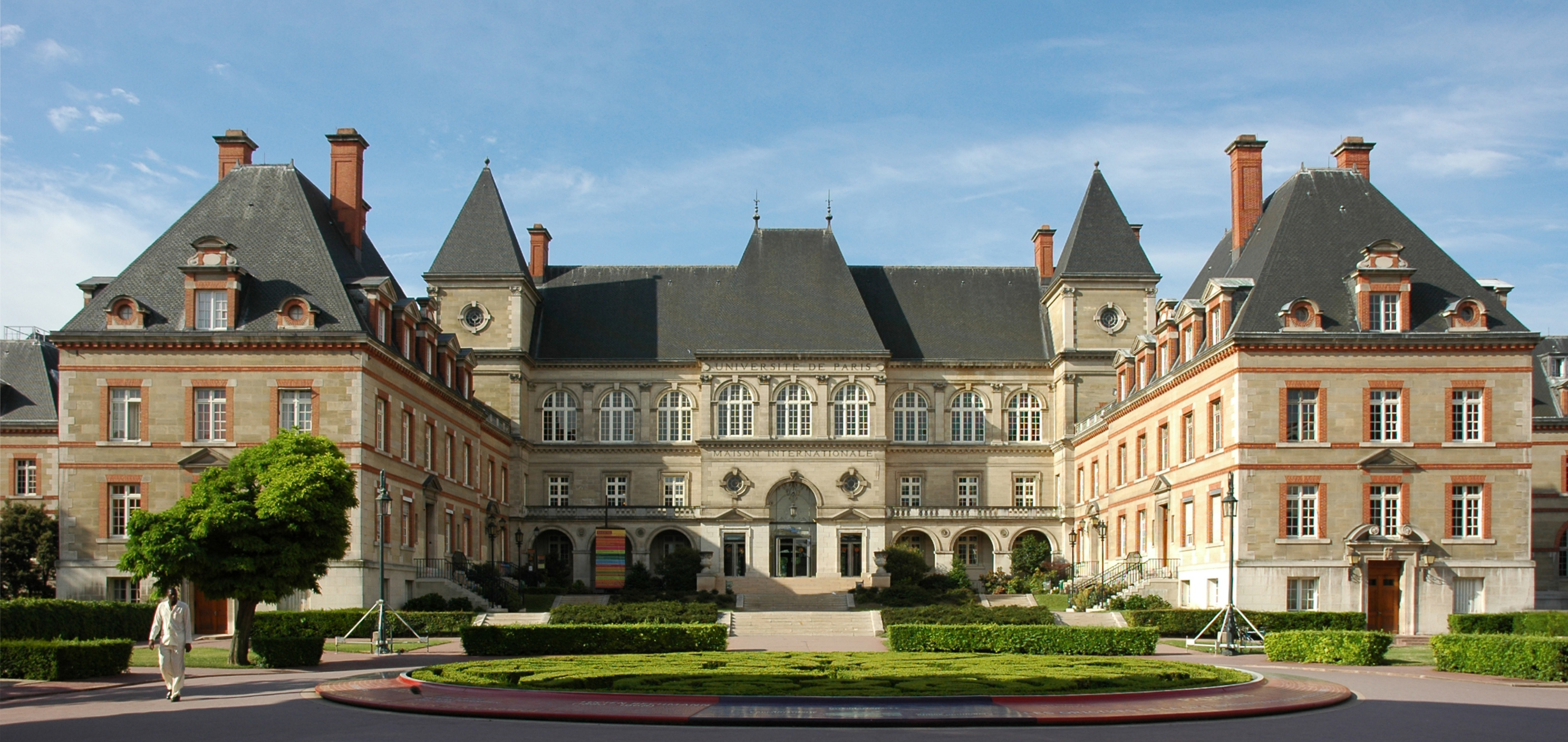
Maison Internationale at the Cité Internationale Universitaire de Paris (in the style of the Palace of Fontainebleau instead of Larson's usual Colonial Revival style), building opened 1936

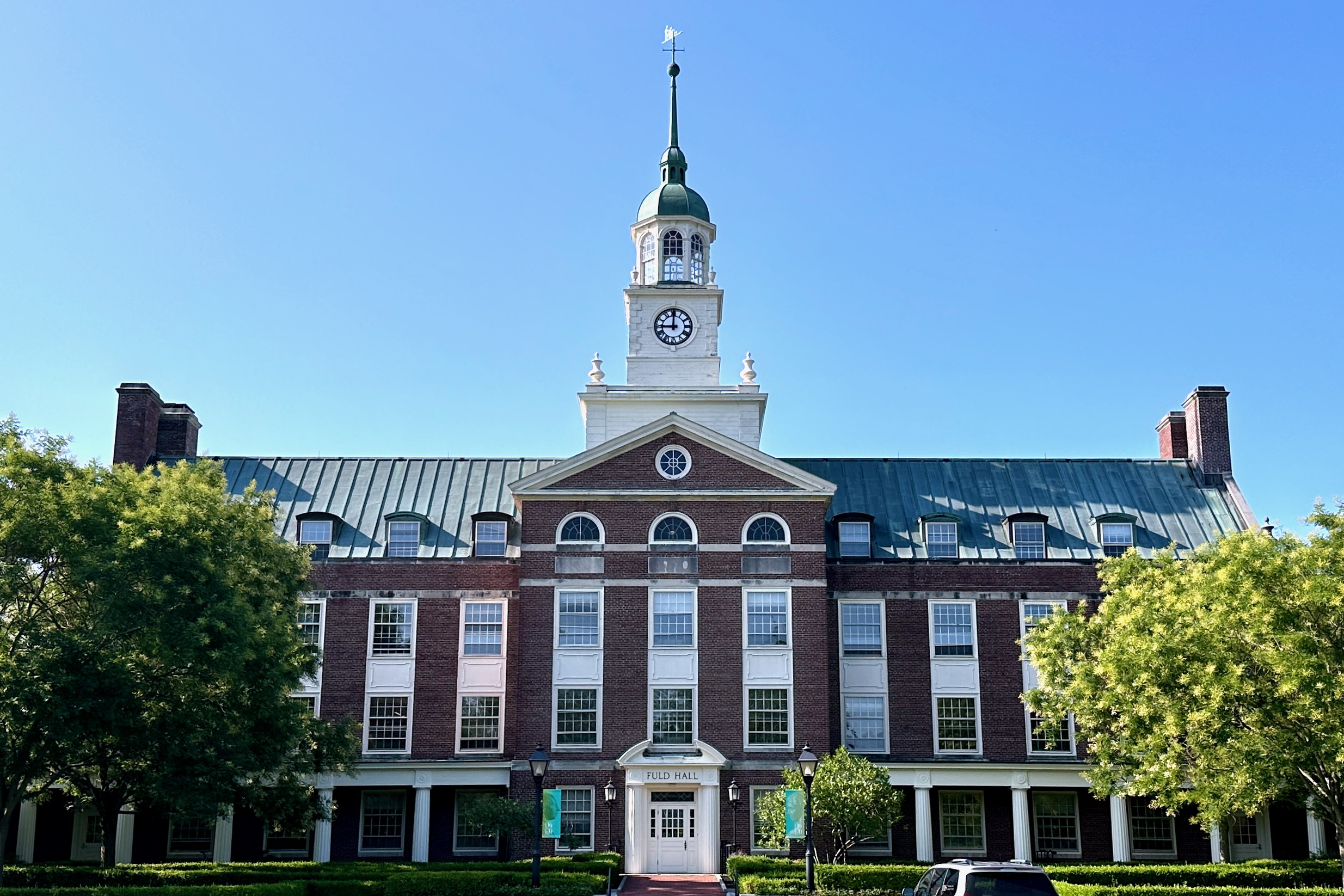
Fuld Hall at the Institute for Advanced Study, building opened 1939

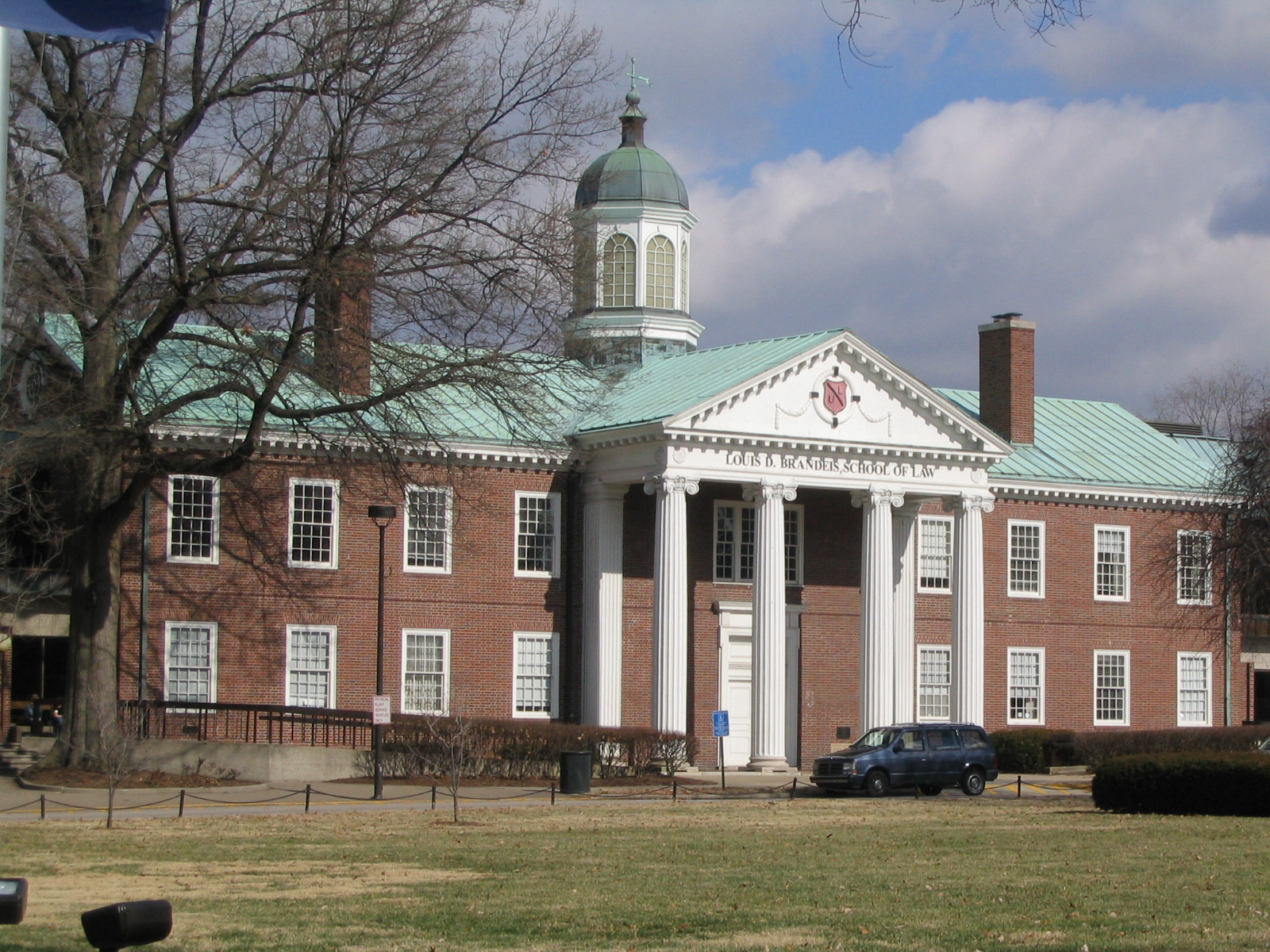
Louis D. Brandeis School of Law at the University of Louisville, building opened 1939

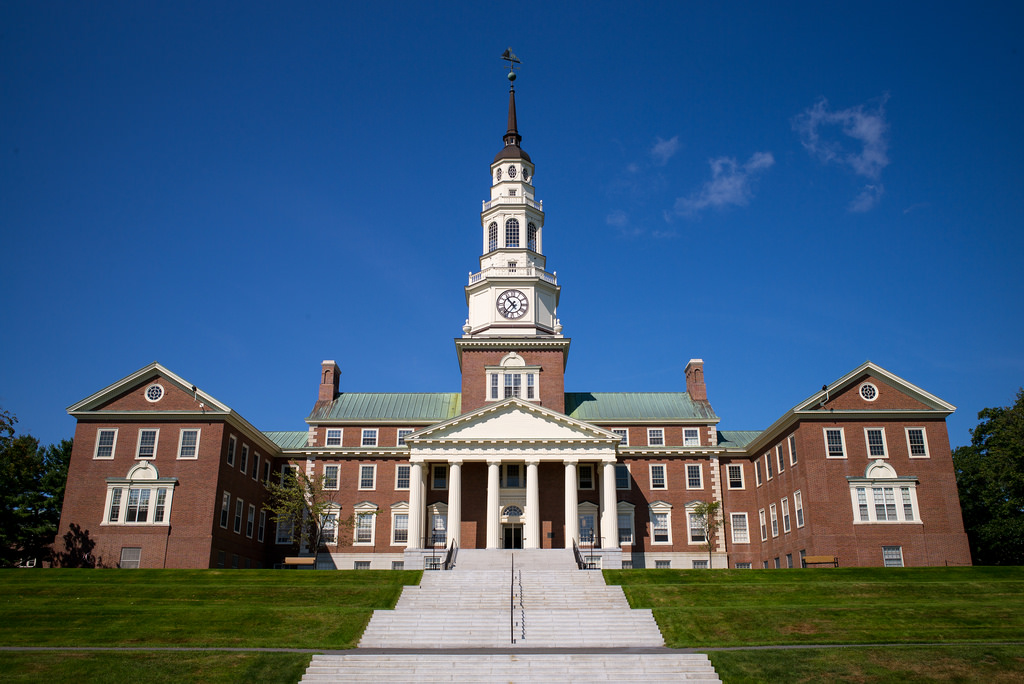
Miller Library at Colby College, building opened 1947

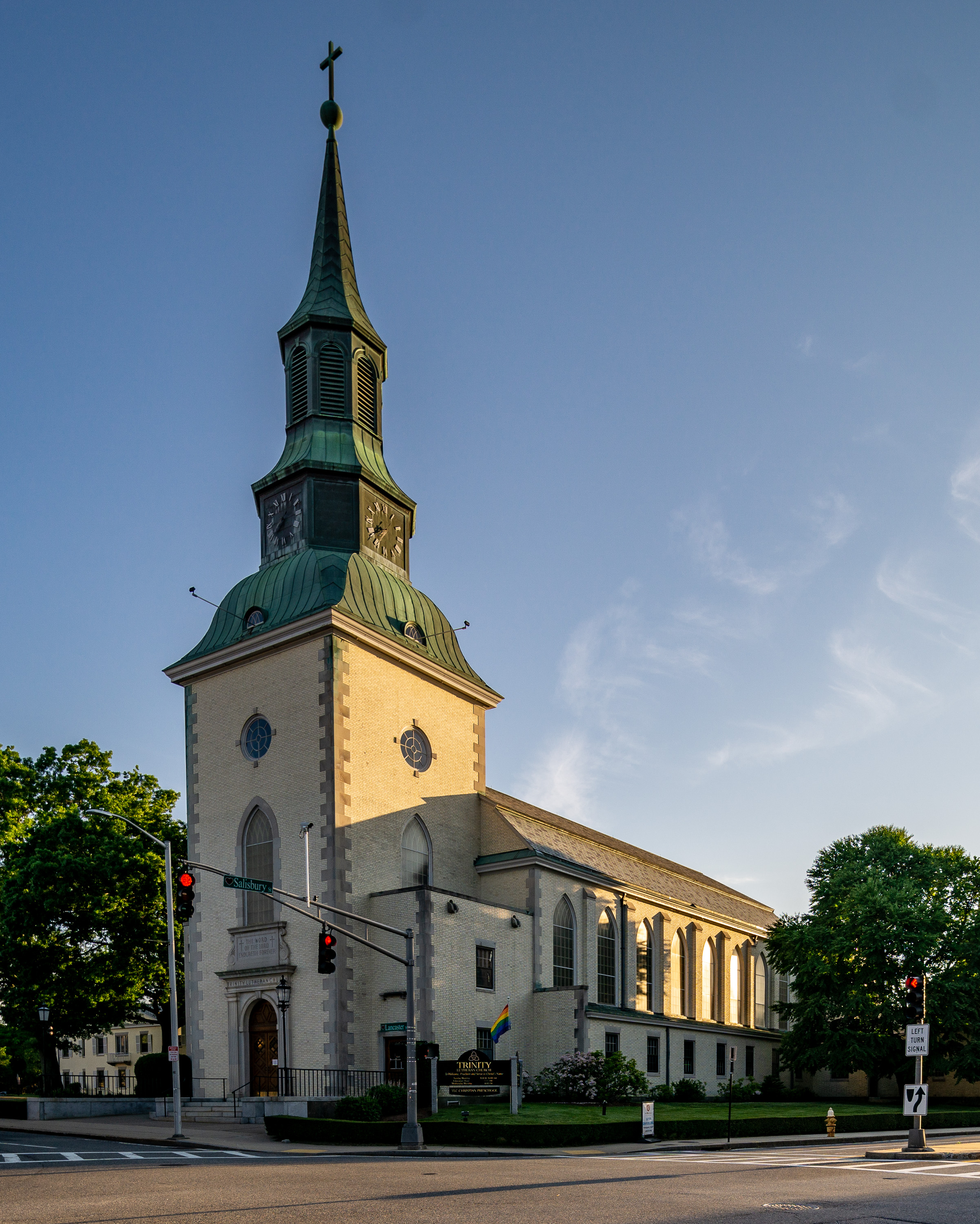
Trinity Lutheran Church in Worcester, Massachusetts, begun 1948 and completed in 1951. The design was heavily influenced by Scandinavian church architecture.

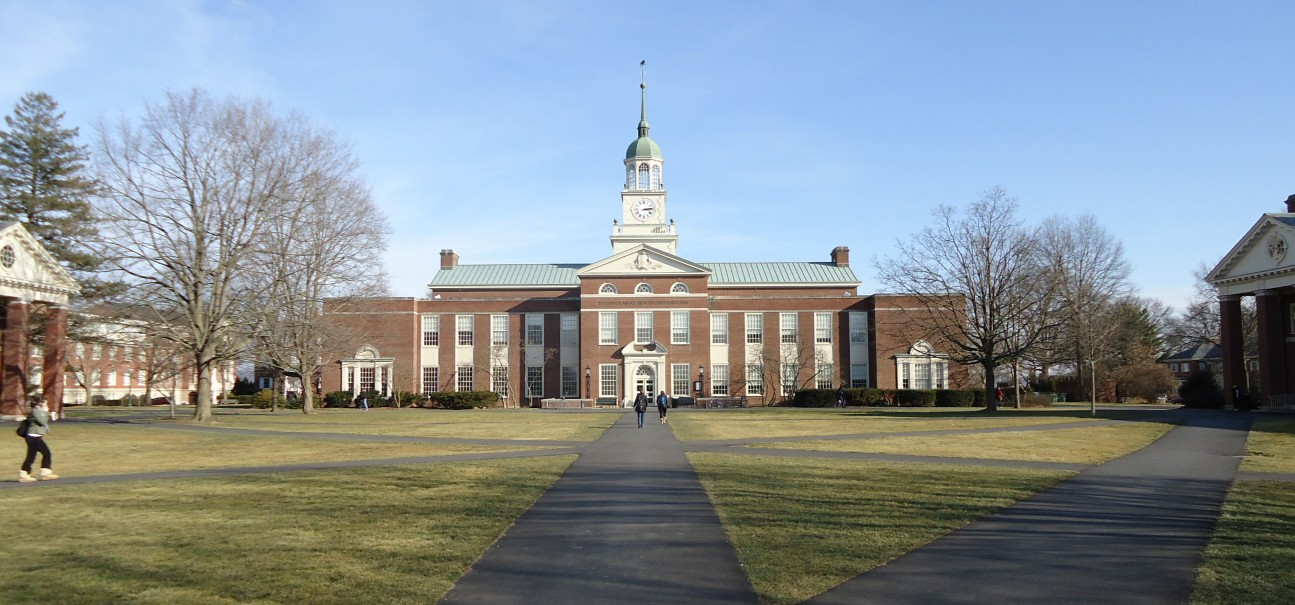
Ellen Clarke Bertrand Library at Bucknell University, building opened 1951

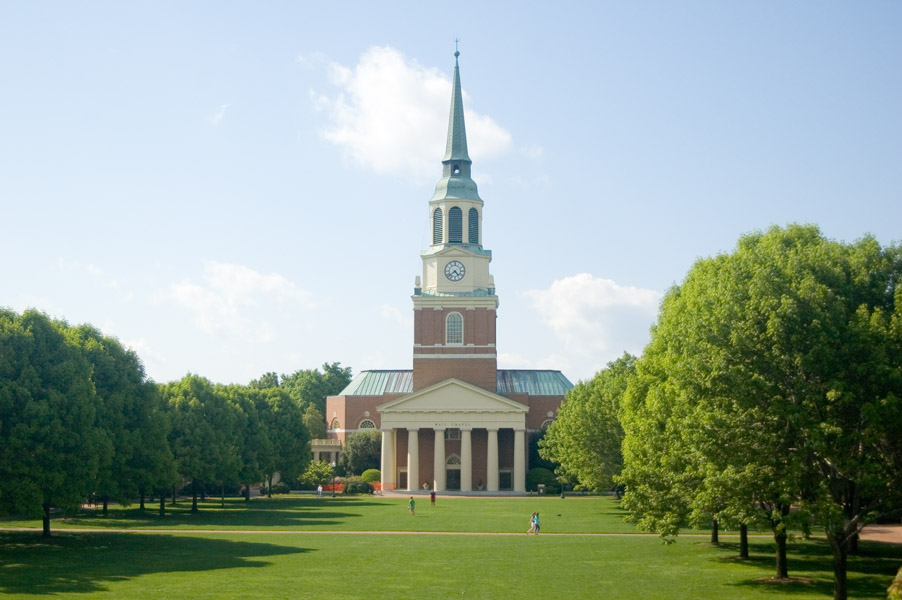
Wait Chapel at Wake Forest University, building opened 1956

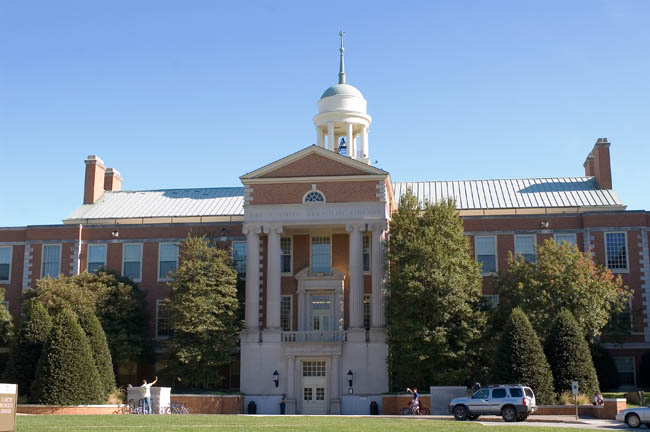
Z. Smith Reynolds Library at Wake Forest University, building opened 1956

== See also ==
- List of World War I flying aces from the United States
