= Merton L. Miller =

Merton Leland Miller
- Born: Fairfield, Maine
- Died: January 25, 1953 (aged 83)
- Education: Colby College, University of Chicago

Merton Leland Miller was a professor of the University of Chicago who also served as the acting chief of the Ethnological Survey for the Philippine Islands. He is the one who discovered and studied the burial jars found on the island of Camiguin in 1910.

== Education ==
Graduated from Colby College in 1890 and earned a PhD from the University of Chicago in 1897.

== Career ==
Acting Chief of The Ethnological Survey for the Philippine Islands. President of the Mindanao Estates Co., a hemp farm organized in Manila, Philippines, in 1904. Involved in tax litigation in 1942 regarding dividends received from the Balatoc Mining Company (now Benguet Corporation).

== Published works ==
- The Non-Christian people of Ambos Camarines, Merton L. Miller, Bureau of Printing, 1911
- The burial mounds of Camiguin Island, Merton L. Miller, Bureau of Printing, 1911
- The Mangyans of Mindoro, Merton L. Miller, Bureau of Printing, 1912
