= Baker-Berry Library =

Library complex in New Hampshire, US

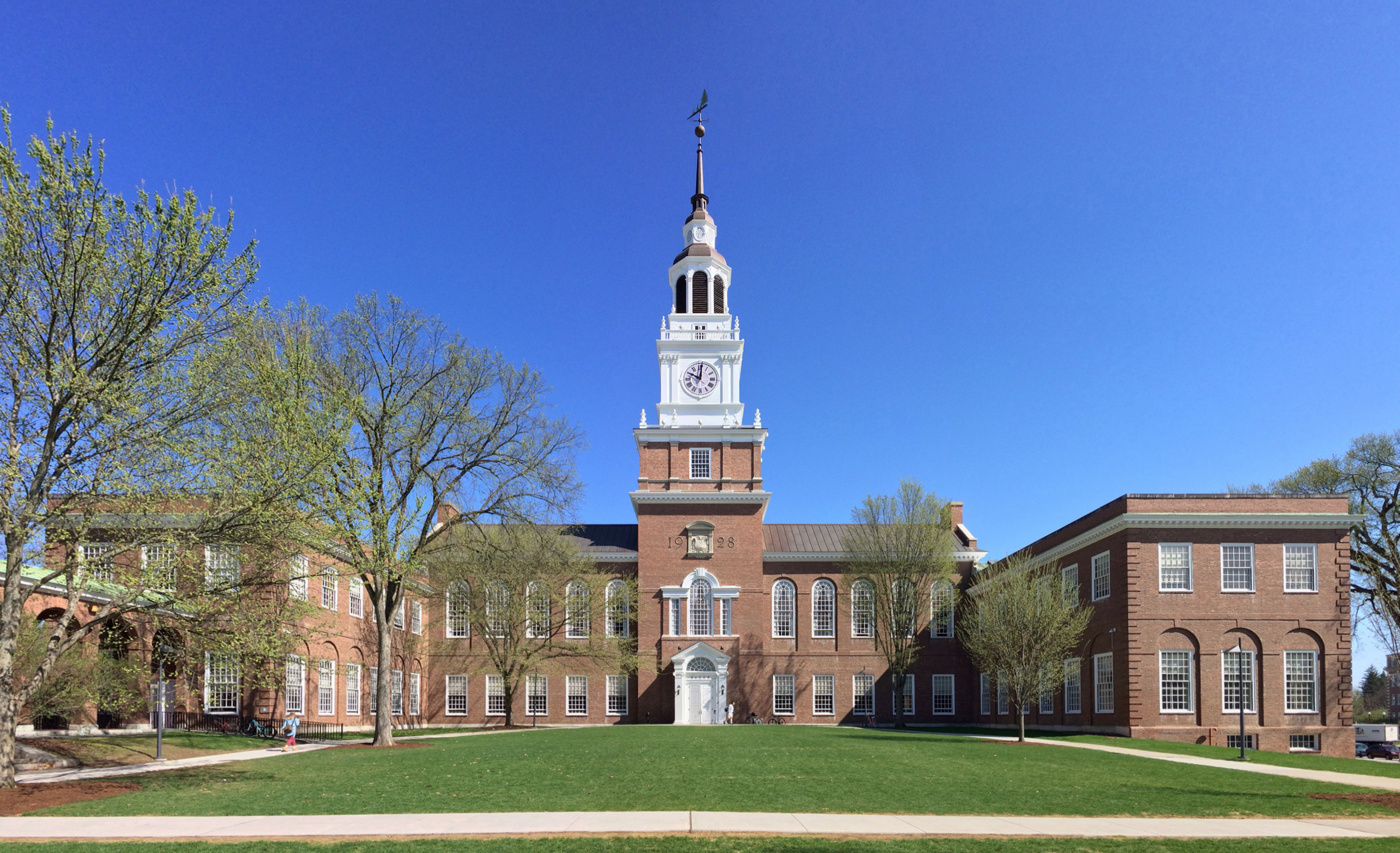
- Fisher Ames Baker Memorial Library
- 43°42′18″N 72°17′21″W
- Location: 25 North Main Street, Hanover, New Hampshire, US
- Type: Academic library
- Established: 1928

Other information
- Affiliation: Dartmouth College
- Website: www.dartmouth.edu/~library/bakerberry/

The Baker-Berry Library is the main library at Dartmouth College in Hanover, New Hampshire. The fresco, The Epic of American Civilization, was painted by José Clemente Orozco in the lower level of the library, and is a National Historic Landmark. Baker's tower, designed after Independence Hall in Philadelphia, stands 200 feet above campus and is often used as an iconic representation of the college.

== History ==
The original, historic library building is the Fisher Ames Baker Memorial Library; it opened in 1928 with a collection of 240,000 volumes. The building was designed by Jens Fredrick Larson, modeled after Independence Hall in Philadelphia, and funded by a gift to Dartmouth College by George Fisher Baker in memory of his uncle, Fisher Ames Baker, Dartmouth class of 1859. The facility was expanded in 1941 and 1957–1958 and received its one millionth volume in 1970.

In 1992, John Berry and the Baker family donated US $30 million for the construction of a new facility, the Berry Library designed by architect Robert Venturi, adjoining the Baker Library. The new complex, the Baker-Berry Library, opened in 2000 and was completed in 2002. The Dartmouth College libraries presently hold over 2 million volumes in their collections.

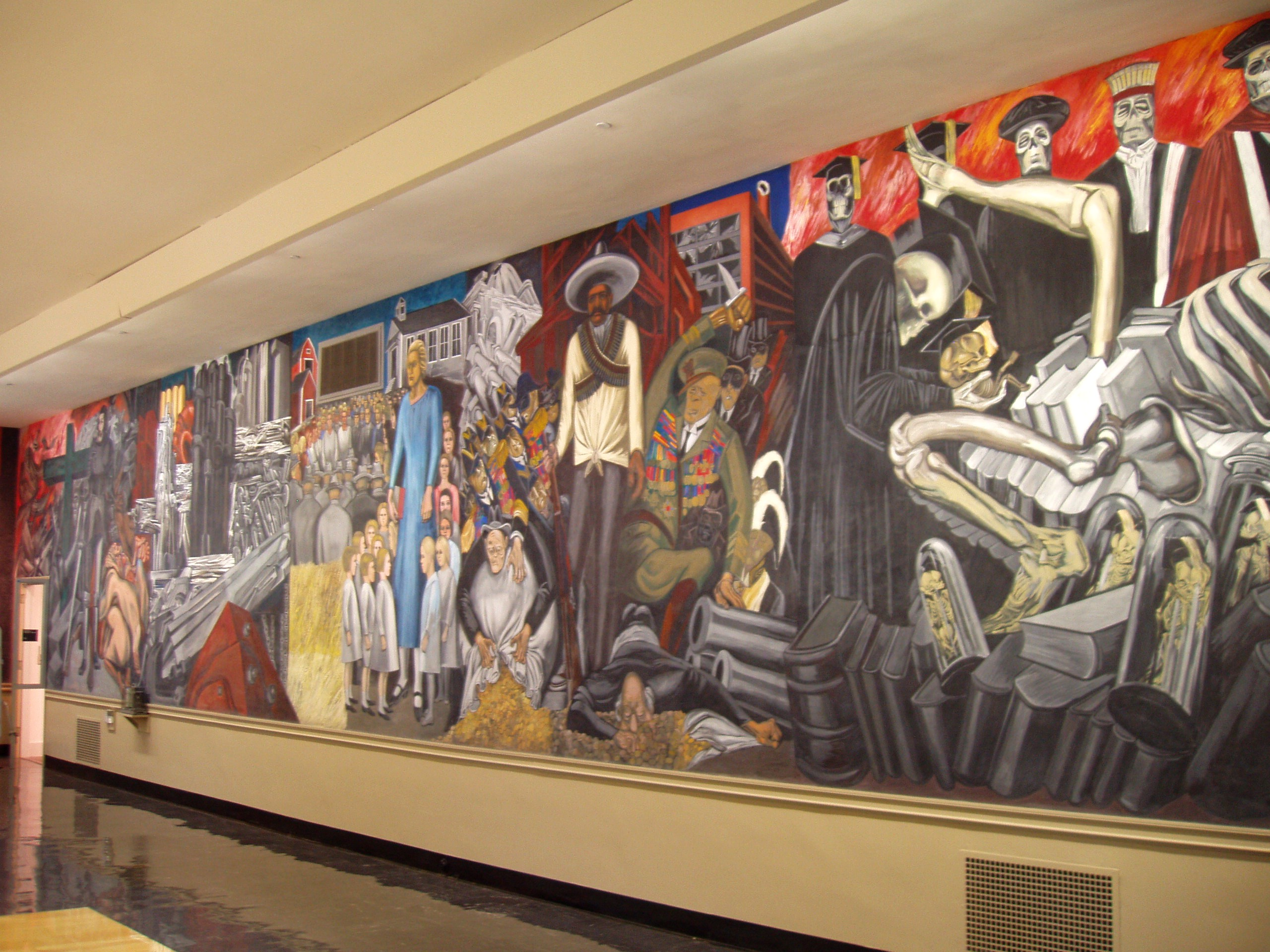
Section, Dartmouth mural (1932–1934) by José Clemente Orozco

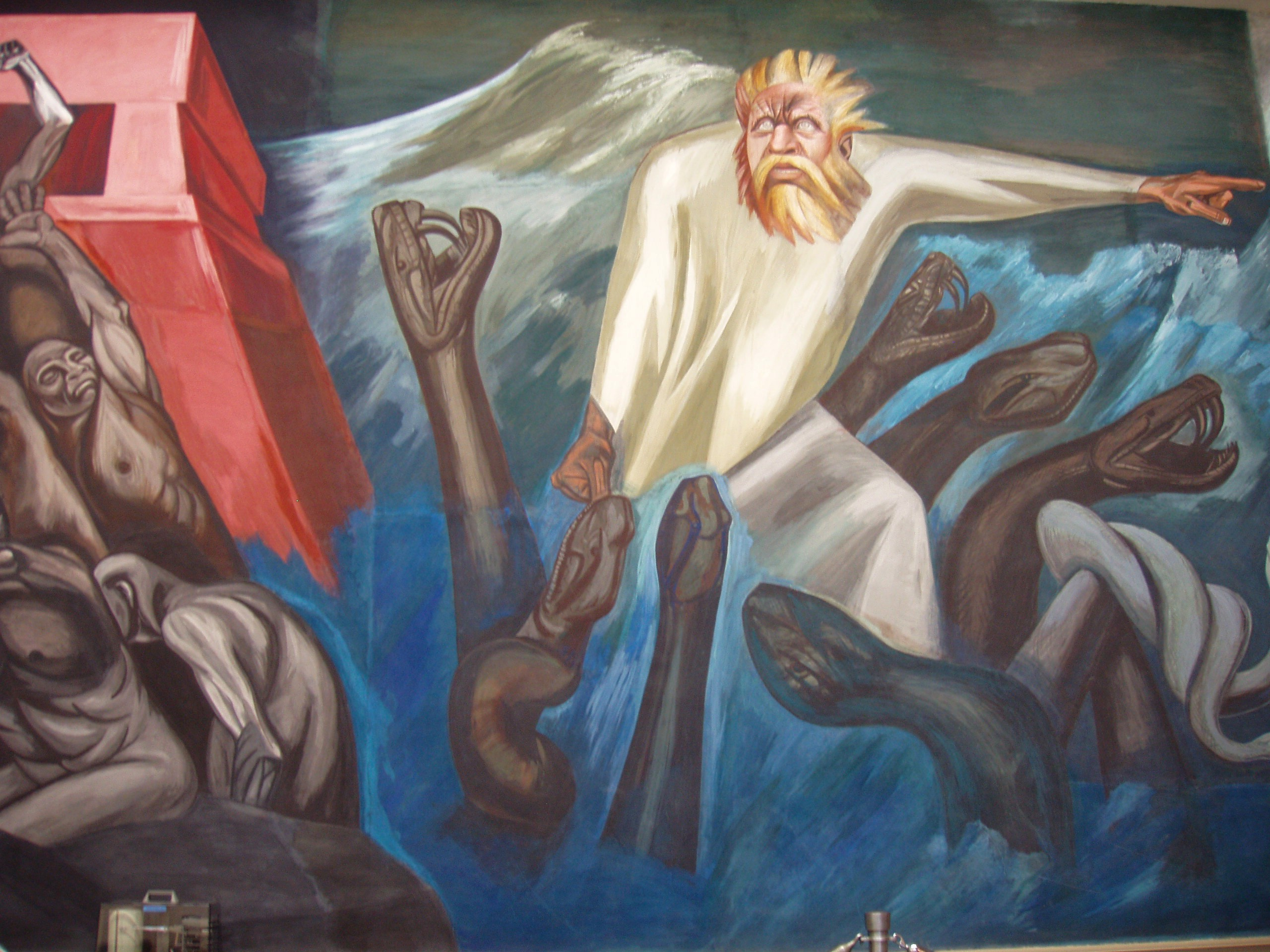
Departure of Quetzalcoatl, Dartmouth mural by José Clemente Orozco

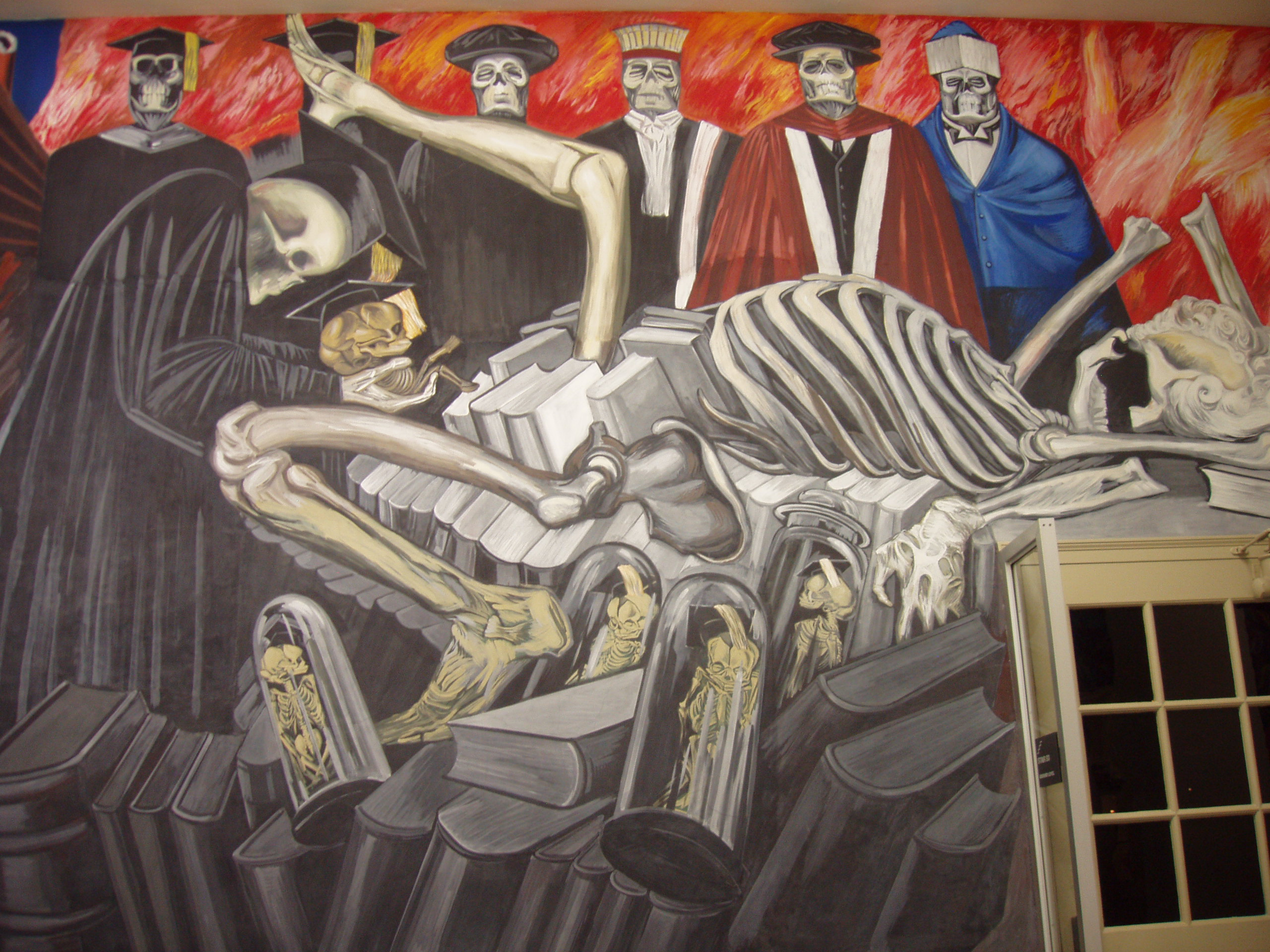
Gods of the Modern World, Dartmouth mural by José Clemente Orozco
