= List of presidents of Bucknell University =

This is a list of presidents of Bucknell University.

Image	Name	Tenure
	Stephen William Taylor	1846–1851*
	Howard Malcom	1851–1857
	George Ripley Bliss	1857–1858; 1871–1872*
	Justin Rolph Loomis	1858–1879
	Francis Wayland Tustin	1879 (interim)
	David Jayne Hill	1879–1888
	George G. Groff	1888–1889 (interim)
	John Howard Harris	1889–1919
	Emory William Hunt	1919–1931
	Charles Parker Vaughan	1931 (interim)
	Homer Price Rainey	1931–1935
	Arnaud Cartwright Marts	1935–1938
	Herbert Lincoln Spencer	1945–1949
	Horace A. Hildreth	1949–1953
	Joseph Welles Henderson	1953–1954 (interim)
	Merle Middleton Odgers	1954–1964
	Charles Henry Watts II	1964–1976
	G. Dennis O'Brien	1976–1984
	John Frederick Zeller III	1984 (interim)
	Gary Allan Sojka	1984–1995
	William Drea Adams	1995–2000
	Steffen H. Rogers	2000–2004
	Brian C. Mitchell	2004–2010
	John C. Bravman	2010–present
