= John Frederick Zeller III =

American university president

President of Bucknell University
- In office July 1, 1984 – August 1984
- Preceded by: G. Dennis O'Brien
- Succeeded by: Gary Allan Sojka

Personal details
- Born: April 18, 1919 Lewisburg, Pennsylvania
- Died: December 8, 2010 (aged 91) Lewisburg, Pennsylvania
- Education: Bucknell University; University of Pennsylvania Law School
- Profession: Chief Financial Officer, Attorney, and College President

John Frederick Zeller III (April 18, 1919 – December 8, 2010) was briefly the President of Bucknell University.

Born in Lewisburg, Pennsylvania, Zeller attended Lewisburg High School, graduating in 1937. He graduated from Bucknell in 1941, and obtained a master's degree in Political Science from Bucknell in 1942. After serving in the U.S. Army from 1942 to 1945, he attended the University of Pennsylvania Law School (1948), where he was Editor-in-Chief of the Law Review.

After practicing law and teaching political science at Bucknell from 1948 to 1950, Zeller served in the Korean War from 1950 to 1952, earning a Bronze Star. He later again practiced law and taught before becoming Bucknell’s Chief Financial Officer and General Counsel in 1955. He served as Vice President of Finance and Administration until 1986, simultaneously served as general counsel until 1988, and was acting President between the administrations of G. Dennis O'Brien and Gary Allan Sojka in 1984.
