= Robert Lowry House =

- Interactive map of the Robert Lowry House area

General information
- Location: Lewisburg, Pennsylvania, U.S., 110 University Avenue
- Coordinates: 40.958681°N 76.88137°W
- Opened: 1869 (157 years ago)

The Robert Lowry House is a building in Lewisburg, Pennsylvania, United States. Now part of Bucknell University, it was the home of hymn-writer Robert Lowry (1826–1899) from 1869 to 1875. Lowry wrote several of his best-known hymns while living there. The building, which is constructed of brick, stands at 110 University Avenue, across from the President's House, on Loomis Street, and the university's 1905 Memorial Gateway.

The Union County Industrial Railroad passes immediately to the north of the building as it crosses University Avenue.

The Pennsylvania Historical and Museum Commission erected a marker outside the building in 1954.
