= Justin Rolph Loomis =

J. R. Loomis, Ph.D L.L.D
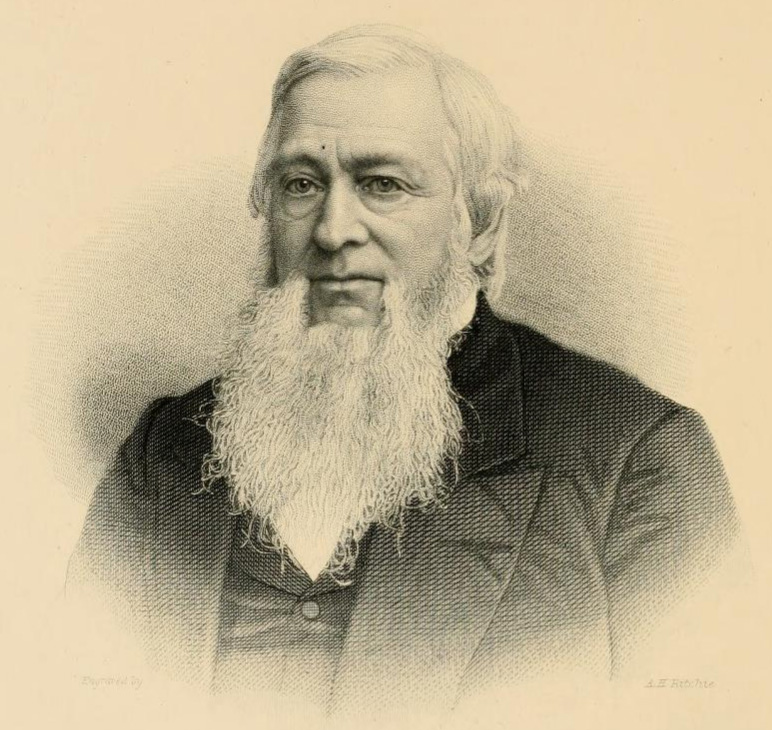
- Loomis engraved by A. H. Ritchie

President of Bucknell University
- In office 1858–1879
- Preceded by: George Ripley Bliss
- Succeeded by: David Jayne Hill

Personal details
- Born: August 21, 1810 Bennington, New York
- Died: June 22, 1898 (aged 87) Lewisburg, Pennsylvania

Justin Rolph Loomis (August 21, 1810 – June 22, 1898) was the fourth president of Bucknell University from 1858 to 1879.

Loomis was married three times. He constructed and lived in a three-story home on South Third Street in Lewisburg, still standing today. He was also instrumental in the construction of President's House, on the Bucknell campus, and the Baptist Church on South Third Street in Lewisburg. Loomis Field and Loomis Street at the university are named in his honor. He is buried in Lewisburg Cemetery on South Seventh Street in Lewisburg.
