= Wendelin Wright =

American materials scientist

Wendelin Jane Wright is an American materials scientist, a professor jointly of mechanical engineering and chemical engineering at Bucknell University, and the chair of Bucknell's Mechanical Engineering Department. She lists her research interests as including the use of nanoindentation to measure avalanches in amorphous materials and the bulk behavior of metallic glass.

== Education and career ==
Wright was educated at Stanford University, from which she has a bachelor's degree, master's degree, and Ph.D. Her 2003 doctoral dissertation, Shear band processes in bulk metallic glasses, was supervised by William D. Nix.

She was Clare Boothe Luce Professor of Mechanical Engineering at Santa Clara University before moving to Bucknell with her husband in 2010. In 2017 she was named Heinemann Family Professor in Engineering at Bucknell.

== Books ==
Wright is a coauthor of textbooks including:

- The Science and Engineering of Materials (with Donald R. Askeland, Cengage Learning, 7th ed., 2015)
- Essentials of Materials Science and Engineering (with Donald R. Askeland, Cengage Learning, 4th ed., 2018)

== Recognition ==
Wright received a Presidential Early Career Award for Scientists and Engineers in 2005. She is a Fellow of ASM International, in its 2016 Class of Fellows.

== Personal life ==
Wright's mother chose her name, Wendelin (a masculine name in German), as a variant of Gwendolyn that she could shorten to Wendy. Two of her grandparents, George and Patricia Keating, were also Stanford alumni. Wright is married to John C. Bravman, the president of Bucknell University.
