= The Bucknellian =

Student newspaper of Bucknell University

- Front page of The Bucknellian from November 18, 2016
- Type: Weekly student newspaper
- Format: Broadsheet
- School: Bucknell University
- Publisher: The Daily Item
- Editor-in-chief: Lindsay Beier
- Managing editor: Courtney Keller
- Founded: 1896 (130 years ago)
- Language: English
- Headquarters: Stuck House, South 7th Street, Lewisburg, Pennsylvania
- Country: United States
- OCLC number: 1041479030
- Website: bucknellian.net

The Bucknellian (formerly called The Orange and the Blue) is the student newspaper of Bucknell University in Lewisburg, Pennsylvania, United States. It was established in 1896, fifty years after the University at Lewisburg (as it was then named) was founded, and is published weekly in Sunbury, Pennsylvania, by The Daily Item.

The newspaper's current editor-in-chief is Lindsay Beier (class of 2026). The role was previously held by Kelsey Werkheiser (class of 2025).

Its newsroom is in Stuck House on South 7th Street in the Bucknell campus. It was previously located in Daniel C. Roberts Hall, then the Rooke Chemistry Building.
