= Bucknell Greenway =

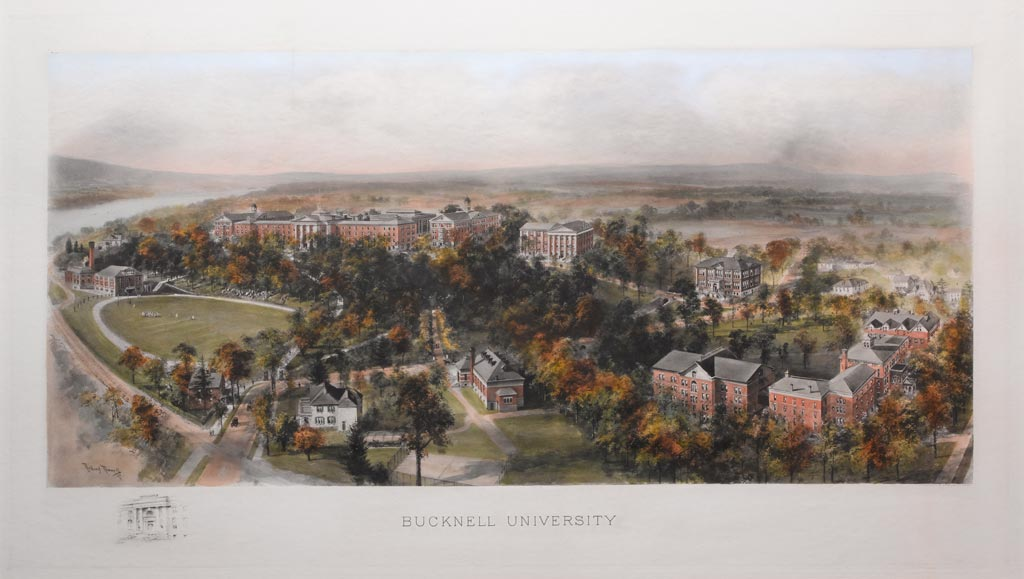
- Bucknell University campus in 1907
- Length: 4 mi (6.4 km)
- Location: Lewisburg, Pennsylvania, U.S.
- Use: Walking; Running; Cycling
- Difficulty: Easy
- Season: All year

The Bucknell Greenway is an educational recreation path in Lewisburg, Pennsylvania, United States. When completed, it will run for around 4 miles (6.4 km), circumnavigating the exterior of the Bucknell University campus, and is for use by walkers, runners and cyclists. The path will connect the main campus to the athletic fields, located across the busy U.S. Route 15. It will pass by points such as the Grove, Bucknell Farm and the Christy Mathewson–Memorial Stadium.

The first section of path was opened during the school's Earth Day celebrations in April 2023.

As of 2024, around thirty students were working on the project, under the guidance of Paul Siewers and Gabriel Diego. It will include commemorative plaques, native plants, and trees and benches. QR codes will be added to stops, allowing people to scan them with their phones and read further information. The project is expected to be completed in the spring of 2025.

One of the stops on the path, the former carriage house beside the Bliss–McClure House on University Avenue, was a stop on the Underground Railway which passed through Union County.
