= Charles Henry Watts II =

President of Bucknell University from 1964 to 1976

President of Bucknell University
- In office 1964–1976
- Preceded by: Merle Middleton Odgers
- Succeeded by: G. Dennis O'Brien

Personal details
- Born: 1926 Bronxville, New York
- Died: September 27, 2001 Freedom, New Hampshire
- Education: Brown University (PhD)

Charles Henry Watts II (1926–2001) was the president of Bucknell University from 1964 to 1976. He was named Bucknell's 11th president at the age of 37.
