= Merle Middleton Odgers =

President of Bucknell University
- In office 1954–1964
- Preceded by: Joseph Welles Henderson
- Succeeded by: Charles Henry Watts II

Personal details
- Born: April 21, 1900; Philadelphia, Pennsylvania, U.S.
- Died: September 6, 1983 (aged 83); Clearwater, Florida, U.S.
- Resting place: Lewisburg Cemetery, Lewisburg, Pennsylvania, U.S.
- Parent(s): David Odgers; Elizabeth Ramsay
- Education: Central High School; University of Pennsylvania (MA, PhD)
- Occupation: Academic; educator

Merle Middleton Odgers (April 21, 1900 – September 6, 1983) was president of Bucknell University from 1954 until his retirement in 1964, from when he became known as president emeritus.

== Biography ==
Born in Philadelphia on April 21, 1900, Odgers was a son of David Odgers and Elizabeth (Ramsay) Odgers. He graduated with first academic honors from Central High School in Philadelphia in 1918, and then from the University of Pennsylvania with class honors in 1922. He was a member of Phi Beta Kappa.

After receiving his Master of Arts and Doctor of Philosophy degrees from Penn in 1924 and 1928 respectively, he taught Latin at the university until 1933, when he was named dean of Penn's College of Liberal Arts for Women.

Odgers was then named president of Girard College, a Philadelphia secondary school for orphan boys. He held that position from 1936 to 1954.

Odgers authored Alexander Dallas Bache: Scientist and Educator, which was published by the University of Pennsylvania Press in 1947.

From 1954 until his retirement in 1964, Odgers was president of Bucknell University. He was then named president emeritus of the university.

== Illness, death and interment ==
Following a brief illness, Odgers died at the Oak Cove Health Center in Clearwater, Florida, on September 6, 1983. His remains were returned to his home state of Pennsylvania, where he was interred in Lewisburg Cemetery.
