= Lewisburg Cemetery =

Historic cemetery in Lewisburg, Pennsylvania, United States

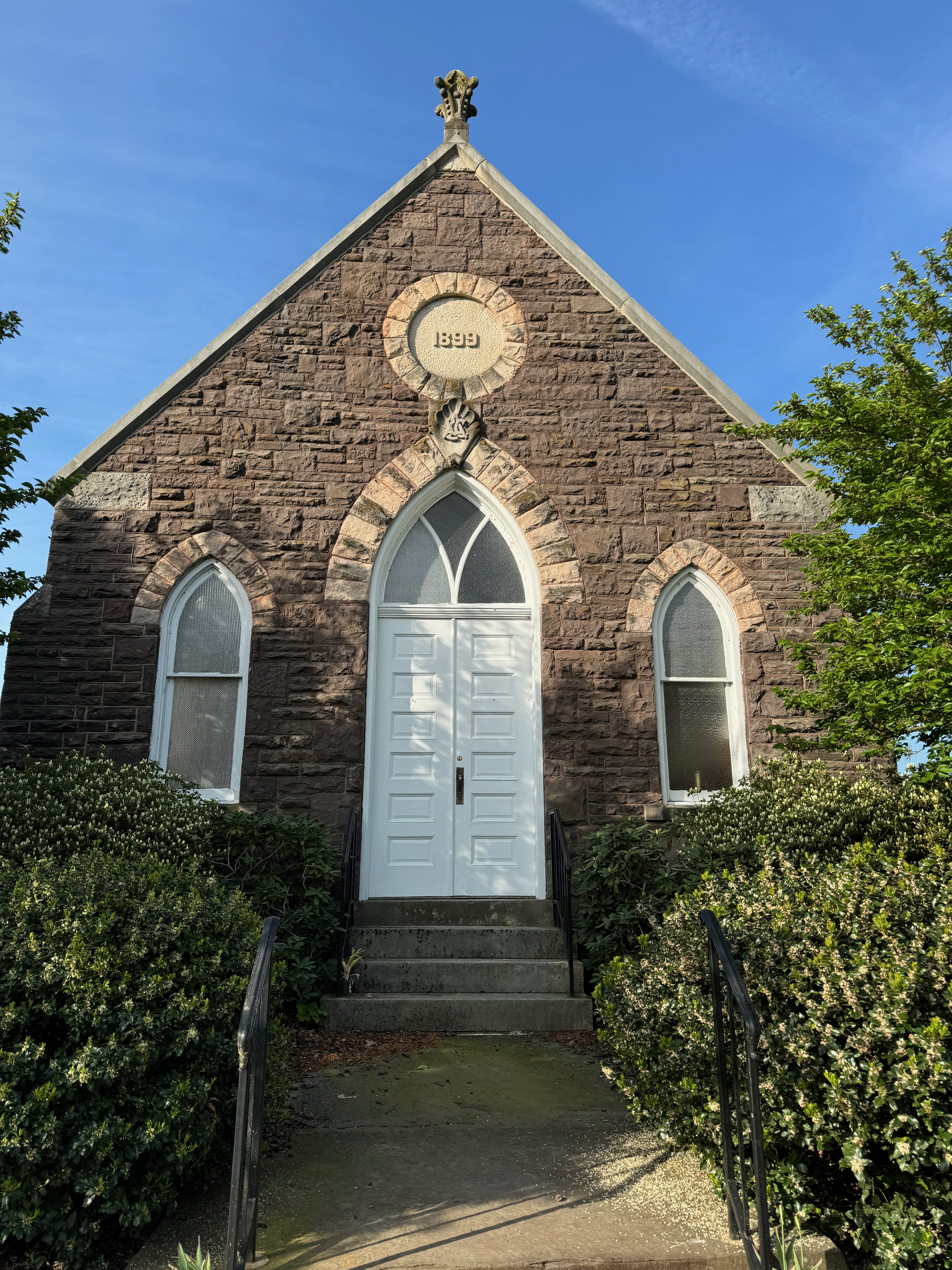
- The cemetery's chapel, on Chapel Lane
- Interactive map of Lewisburg Cemetery

Details
- Established: 1848 (178 years ago)
- Location: South 7th Street, Lewisburg, Pennsylvania
- Country: United States
- Coordinates: 40.958349°N 76.888090°W
- Owned by: Lewisburg Cemetery Association
- Size: 38 acres (15 ha)
- Website: https://www.lewisburgcemetery.org/
- Find a Grave: Lewisburg Cemetery

Lewisburg Cemetery is a historic cemetery in Lewisburg, Pennsylvania, United States. Located immediately to the north of Bucknell University, and dating to 1848, it is a contributing site of the Lewisburg Historic District. There are around 13,000 burials in the cemetery.

The cemetery is bounded by South 7th Street to the east (from which is the only entrance), St. Catharine Street to the north, and South Derr Drive (U.S. Route 15) to the west. (St. Catharine Street is now disjointed, its layout having been altered after the cemetery's expansions. A separate section continues east to South 6th Street at Hufnagle Park.)

== History ==
Upon completion of the cemetery's boundaries of its original 6 acres (2.4 ha), interments from other graveyards in the town, and from Crossroads Church in nearby Buffalo Township, were moved here. As such, several early settlers of Union County, including veterans of the Revolutionary War and the War of 1812, are interred here. The McClure Monument, dating to around 1833, was removed to the cemetery from the graveyard of the Presbyterian Church on Market Street (Pennsylvania Route 45). One of the oldest burials is that of Martha Wilson, a child who died in 1788.

The original cemetery is located off to the right, well beyond the end of the paved Chapel Lane, once inside the main gate. It includes three family burial circles along a path that is wide enough to support horse-drawn hearses. The iron gate on South 7th Street, at the head of the eastern section of St. Catharine Street, would have accommodated them. The iron fence was installed in 1886.

Inside the gate there formerly stood a two-story arched gatehouse, where the cemetery's sexton lived. The gatehouse was moved to today's 638 and 640 St. George Street in 1892. Its archway has since been filled in.

The cemetery was expanded to around 12 acres (4.9 ha) in 1878. It is 38 acres (15 ha) today.

Many of the cemetery's headstones were carved, in Quincy granite, by stonemason Chauncey Foster, including that of his wife, Enna, who died in 1908. He was buried beside her and their four children upon his death eleven years later. Foster's workshop was on South 4th Street.

The cemetery's chapel was built in 1899. The columbarium and fountain in front of the chapel were added in 2012. The cemetery's vault was built at the same time as the chapel. It is now unused, since graves are dug with machinery.

A mausoleum, for above-ground burials, is located near the cemetery's entrance. It was built in 2009.

The Lewisburg Cemetery Association was incorporated when the cemetery first opened. The association's president is Kathy Lentz, who succeeded Nancy Neuman.

In 2023, to celebrate the 175th anniversary of the cemetery's establishment, tours were held.

The cemetery is site 9 on Bucknell University's "Poetry Path".

== Notable burials ==
- George Ripley Bliss (1816–1893), twice president of Bucknell University
- Justin Rolph Loomis (1810–1898), president of Bucknell University
- Christy Mathewson (1880–1925), Major League Baseball player
- Merle Middleton Odgers (1900–1983), president of Bucknell University
- Robert Levi Rooke (1891–1994), benefactor of Bucknell University
