= Rooke Chapel =

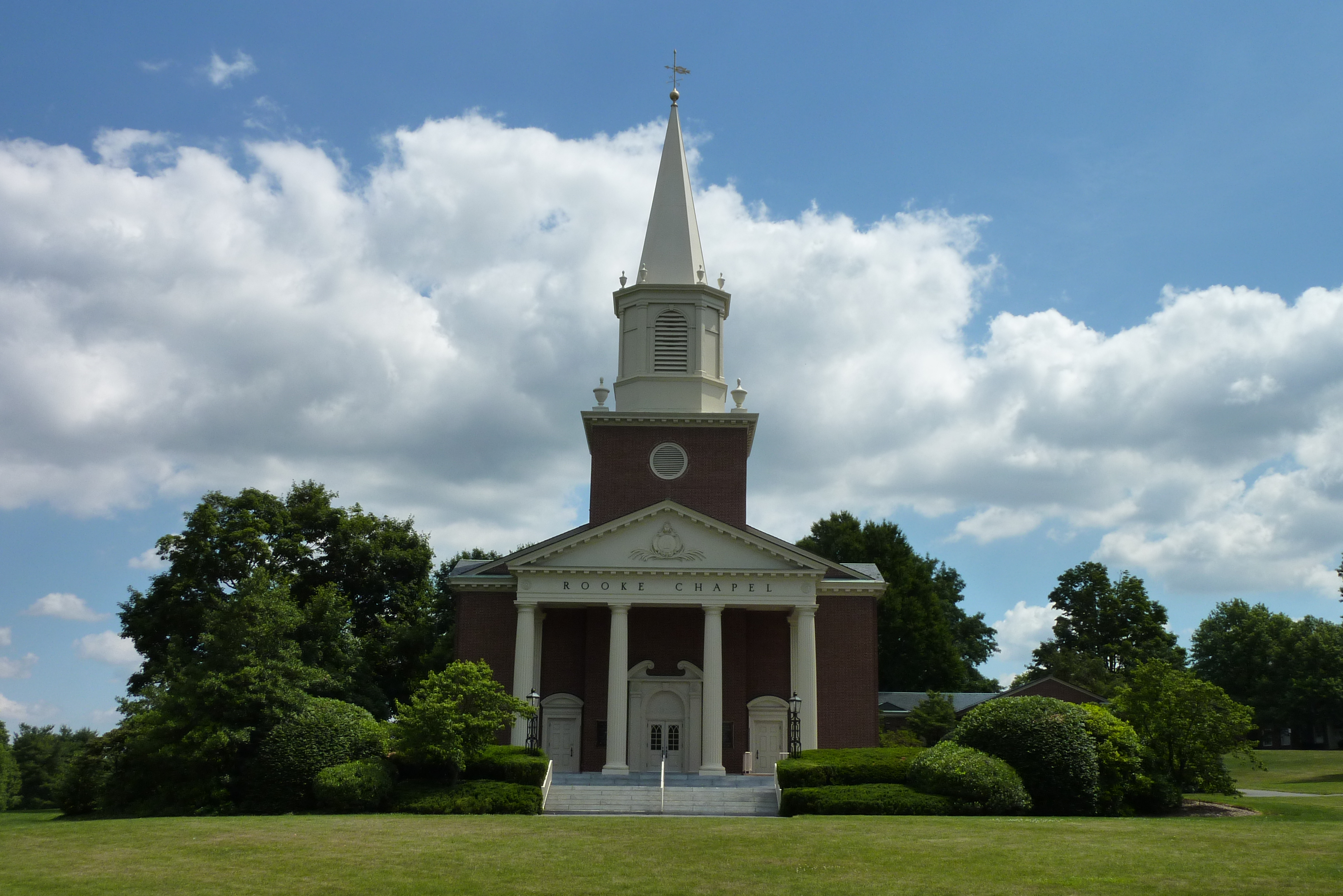
- Rooke Chapel in 2010
- Rooke Chapel
- 40.95456°N 76.88625°W
- Location: Bucknell University
- Country: United States

History
- Dedicated: October 25, 1964 (61 years ago)

Architecture
- Completed: September 1964 (61 years ago)

Specifications
- Capacity: 850

Rooke Chapel is a non-denominational chapel on the campus of Bucknell University in Lewisburg, Pennsylvania, United States. A gift of Robert Levi Rooke (1891–1994), the chapel is named in memory of Rooke's parents, Charles and Olive. Rooke announced the gift in 1963, at the 50th reunion of his class of 1913. It was inaugurated on October 25, 1964.

The main portion of the chapel includes the narthex, sanctuary, chancel area, organ chamber, choir rooms, and balconies which surround the sanctuary on three sides. The sanctuary can seat 850. Attached to the chapel is a one-story wing housing the Office of Religious Life, the Chaplain's office and a meditation space.

Robert Levi Rooke was a university trustee from 1930 to 1975.

A quote, chosen by Rooke, on the chapel's exterior reads: "What doth the Lord require of thee, but to do justly, and to love mercy, and to walk humbly with thy God?" It is from Micah 6:8.

A celebration of the chapel's 50th anniversary was held in October 2014.

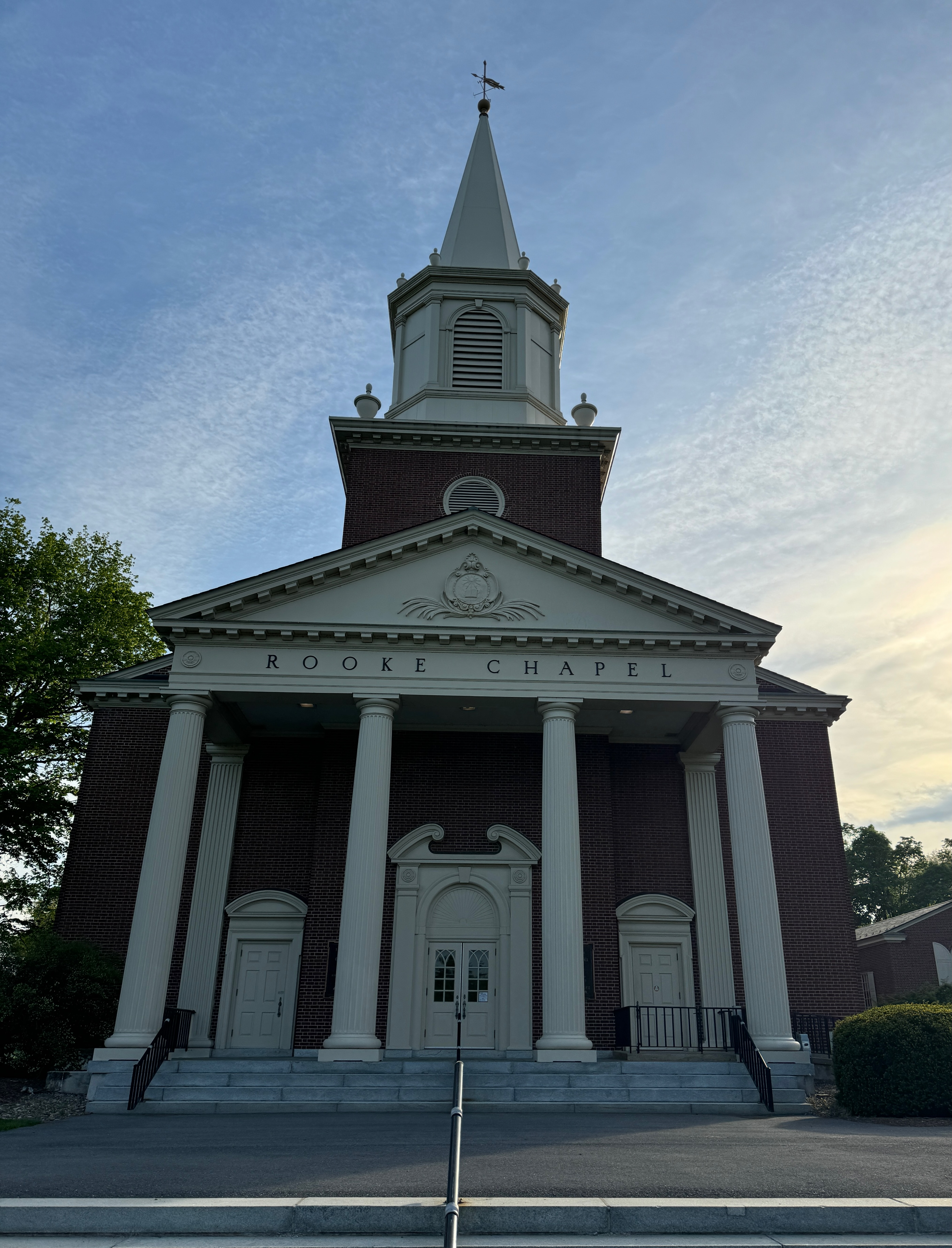
Chapel detail (2024)

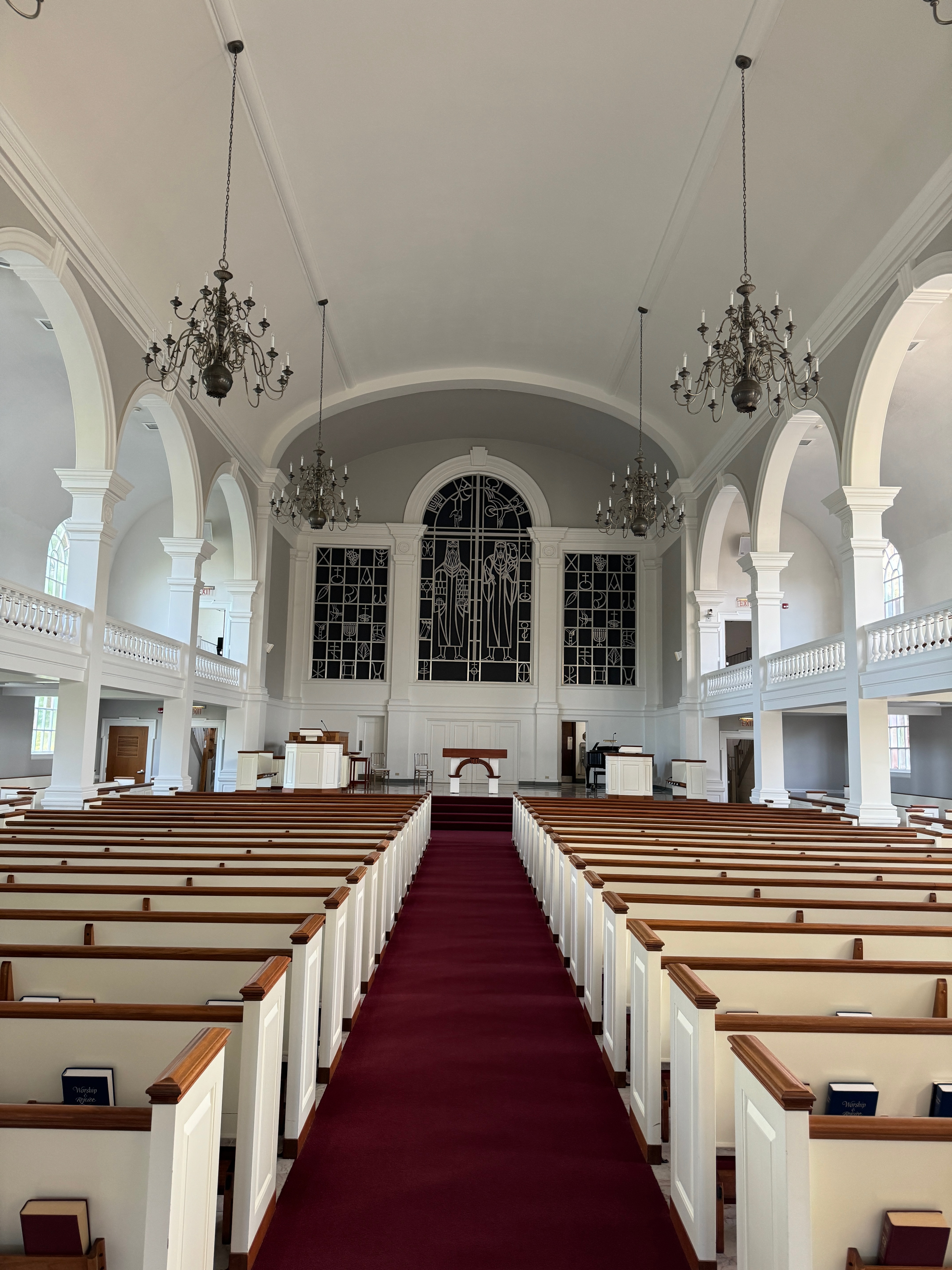
The chapel's interior

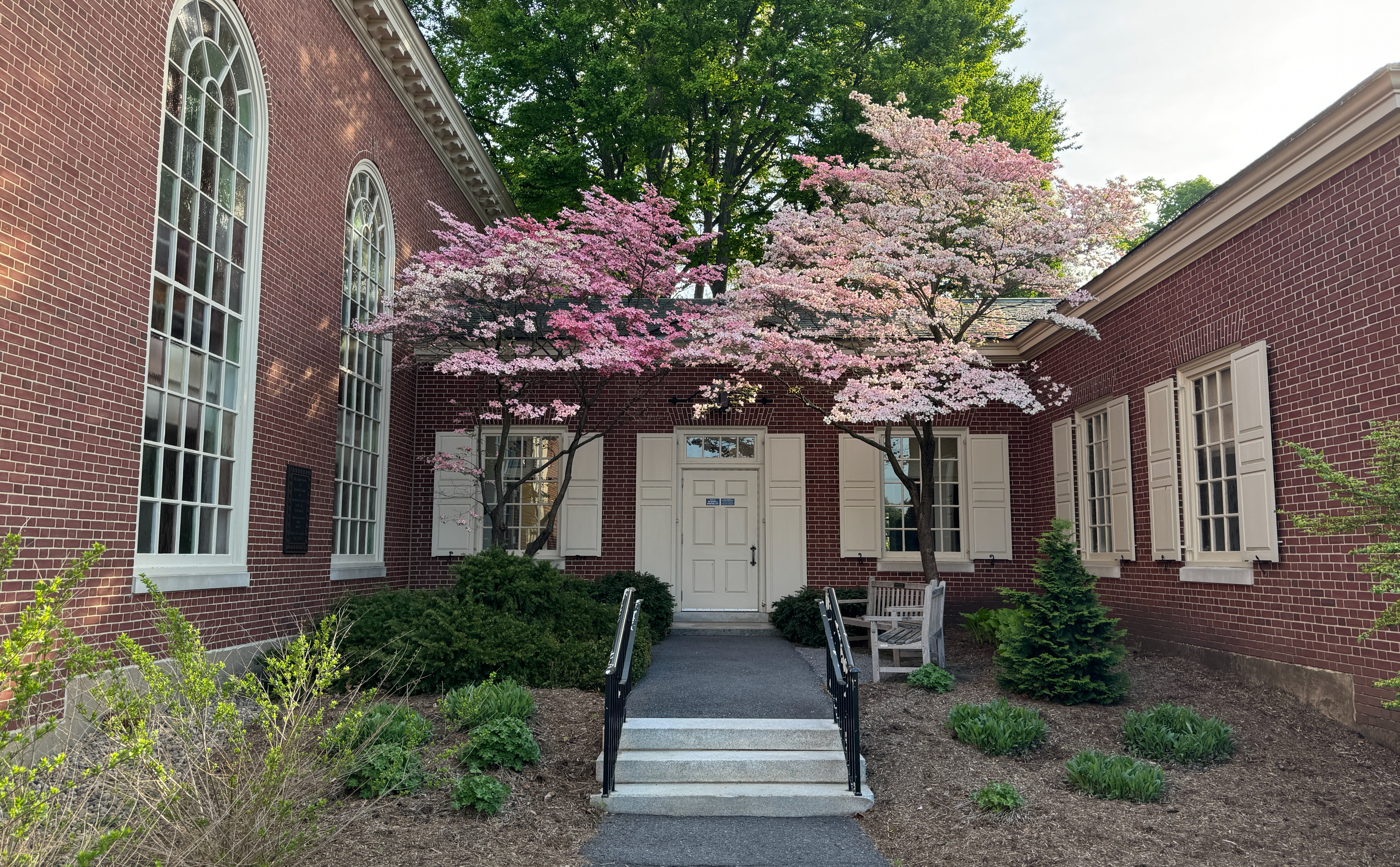
The chaplain's office wing, on the chapel's southeastern side
