= Gary Allan Sojka =

American academic (born 1940)

President of Bucknell University
- In office 1984–1995
- Preceded by: G. Dennis O'Brien
- Succeeded by: William Drea Adams

Personal details
- Born: July 15, 1940 (age 86) Cedar Rapids, Iowa
- Spouse: Sandra
- Education: Coe College; Purdue University
- Profession: Professor

Gary Allan Sojka (born July 15, 1940) is an American academic who was president of Bucknell University from 1984 to 1995.

== Biography ==
Sojka received his bachelor of arts degree from Coe College and his master of science and doctor of philosophy degrees from Purdue University. Sojka later became the president of the Pennsylvania Association of Colleges and Universities. Sojka holds honorary doctorates from Lycoming College, Purdue University and Bucknell University.

Sojka was appointed to the Pennsylvania Gaming Control Board for a two-year term in January 2007 and was reappointed in 2009.

Sojka Pavilion, home of the Bucknell Bison basketball teams since its opening in 2003, was named in his honor.
