= Daniel C. Roberts Hall =

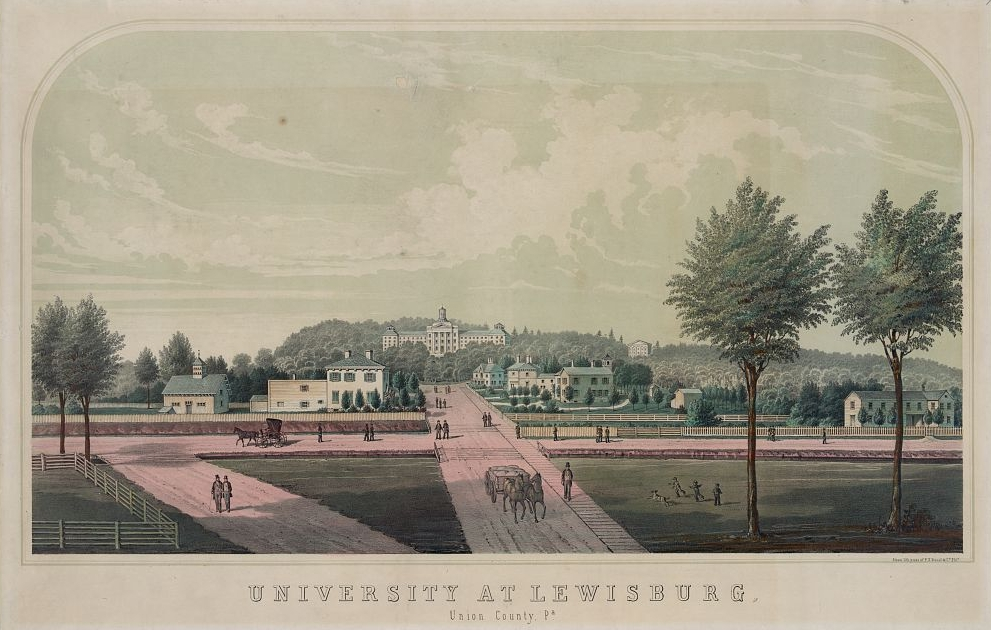
- Old Main, atop College Hill, pictured around 1870 and viewed from the southwest
- Interactive map of the Daniel C. Roberts Hall area

General information
- Location: Lewisburg, Pennsylvania, U.S.
- Coordinates: 40.95670°N 76.88151°W
- Opened: 1858 (168 years ago)

Daniel C. Roberts Hall (commonly known as Roberts Hall or Main College; also known as Old Main) is the oldest residence hall on the Bucknell University campus in Lewisburg, Pennsylvania, United States. It is located on College Hill in the center of the campus, on the northern side of a quadrangle also consisting of Rush H. Kress Hall to the west, Harland A. Trax Hall to the east, and the Carnegie Building to the south. The building is located on South 7th Street, which leads to and from downtown Lewisburg. Beyond its northern side, at the foot of the Grove, University Avenue was the former main approach road to the campus. The 1905 Memorial Gateway is still in place.

Designed by Thomas U. Walter, Old Main was built in 1858, when the institution was named the University at Lewisburg. The university was renamed Bucknell University in 1886, honoring its major benefactor William Bucknell.

After Old Main was damaged by fire in 1932, it was rebuilt between 1935 and 1937 and renamed for university trustee Daniel C. Roberts.

The building underwent a $15 million renovation in 2016.

Today, the building offers housing for the university's sophomore students.
