= Bertrand Library =

Library building of Bucknell University

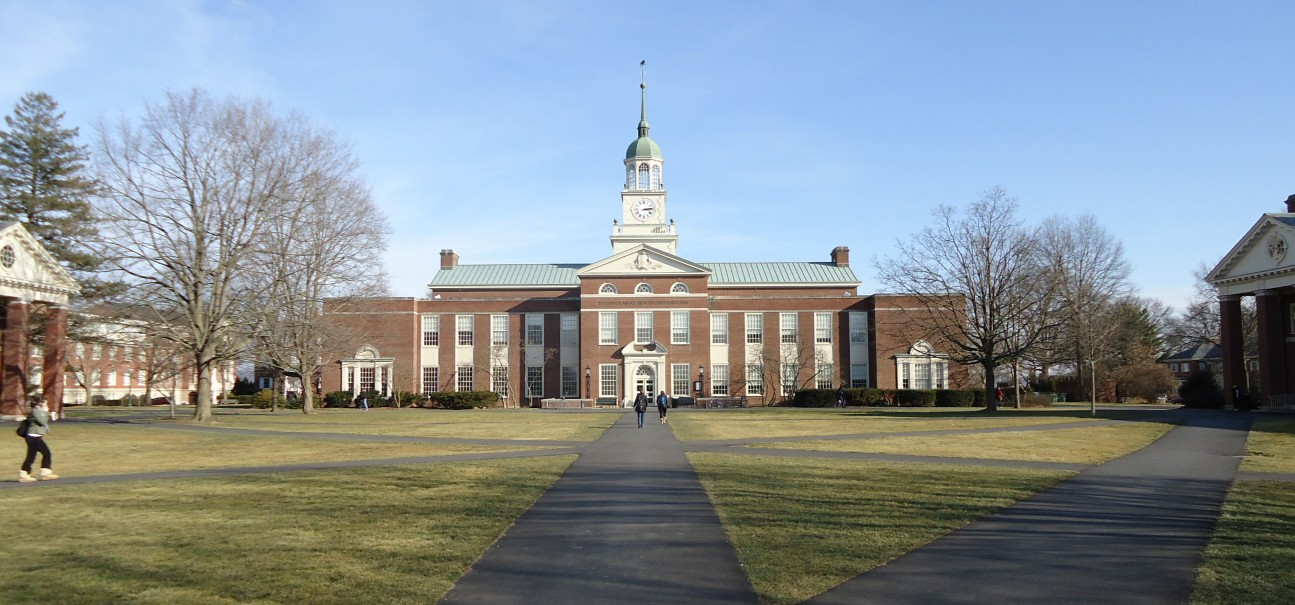
- The building in 2012, looking east
- 40.954423°N 76.882637°W
- Location: Lewisburg, Pennsylvania, U.S.
- Type: Academic
- Established: 1951 (75 years ago)

Access and use
- Access requirements: Bucknell faculty, students and staff

Other information
- Website: Bertrand Library

Bertrand Library is the library of Bucknell University. Built in 1951, it stands at the eastern end of Malesardi Quadrangle. The library, which occupies five floors, is named for Ellen Clarke Bertrand, who contributed $800,000 and a library endowment fund to the university.

Commissioned in 1946, under Bucknell president and former governor of Maine Horace Hildreth, the building's cornerstone was laid on February 24, 1951, just under a year after ground was broken on the project. It was formally opened on September 26, 1951.

On Christmas Eve 1960, a fire damaged the library's roof and clock tower; no books were lost, however, and water damage was minimal. Repairs were completed in 1961.

The library is a member of the Federal Depository Library Program.

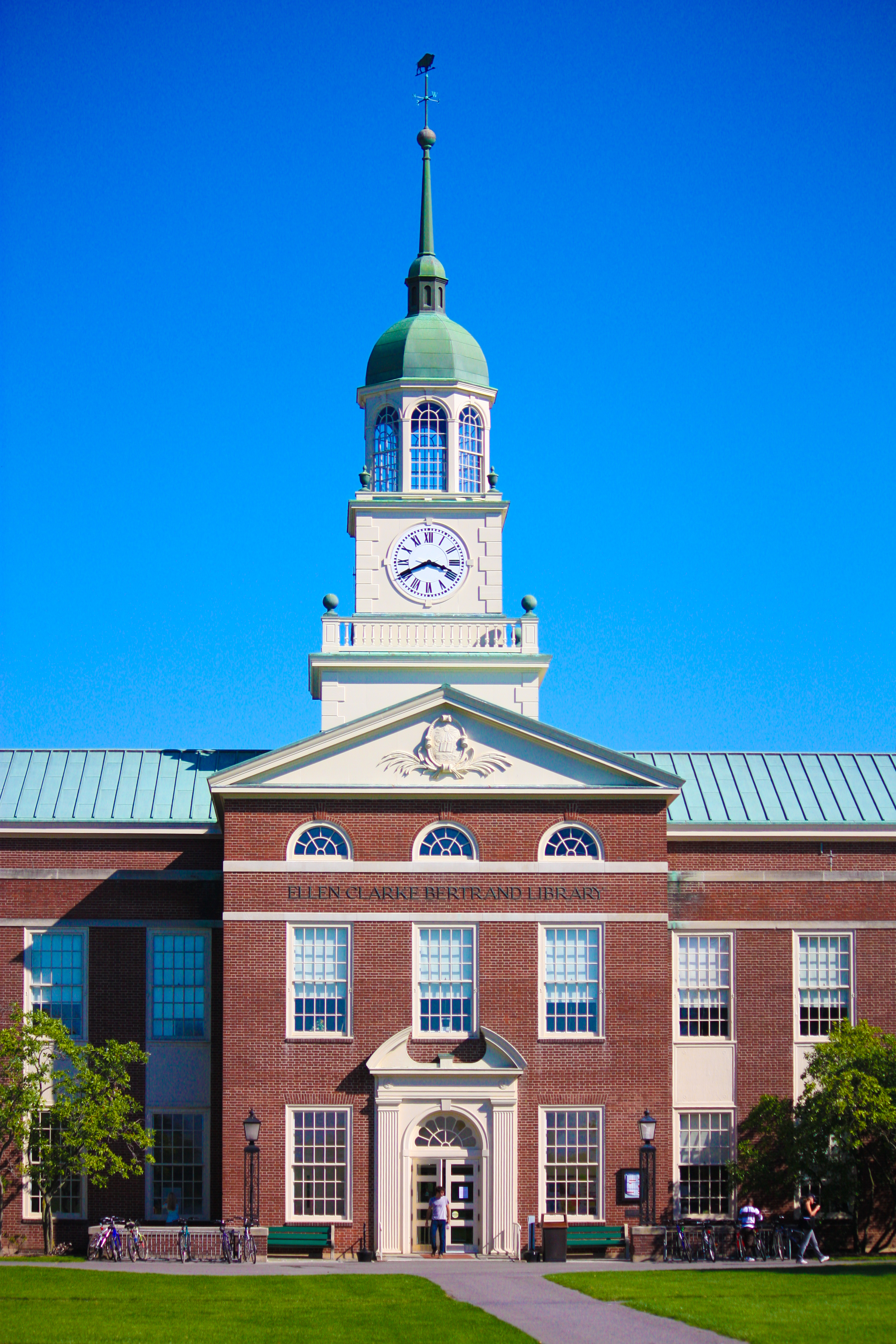
Clocktower detail
