= Robert Levi Rooke =

- Born: June 2, 1891; Winfield, Pennsylvania, U.S.
- Died: June 27, 1994 (aged 103); Palm Beach, Florida, U.S.
- Burial place: Lewisburg Cemetery, Lewisburg, Pennsylvania, U.S.
- Occupations: Businessman; philanthropist
- Years active: 1919–1994

Robert Levi Rooke (June 2, 1891 – June 27, 1994) was an American businessman and philanthropist, and benefactor to Bucknell University.

He gifted Rooke Chapel to Bucknell University in memory of his parents. Rooke Hall, at Colby–Sawyer College, is named for him.

== Early life and education ==
Rooke was born in 1891 in Winfield, Pennsylvania, to Charles M. Rooke and Olive Susan Kreamer. He was their second child; their first, daughter Fanny, died aged two.

After studying in a one-room schoolhouse in Winfield, in 1913 Rooke graduated with a degree in electrical engineering from Bucknell University, located four miles upstream from his hometown. He began working for the General Electric Company and Public Service Electric in New Jersey.

During World War I, he served in the United States Navy.

== Career ==
Rooke became a partner in Merrill Lynch and Company in 1928, nine years after joining the company as a bond salesman. He later established the company's Newark office.

== Personal life ==
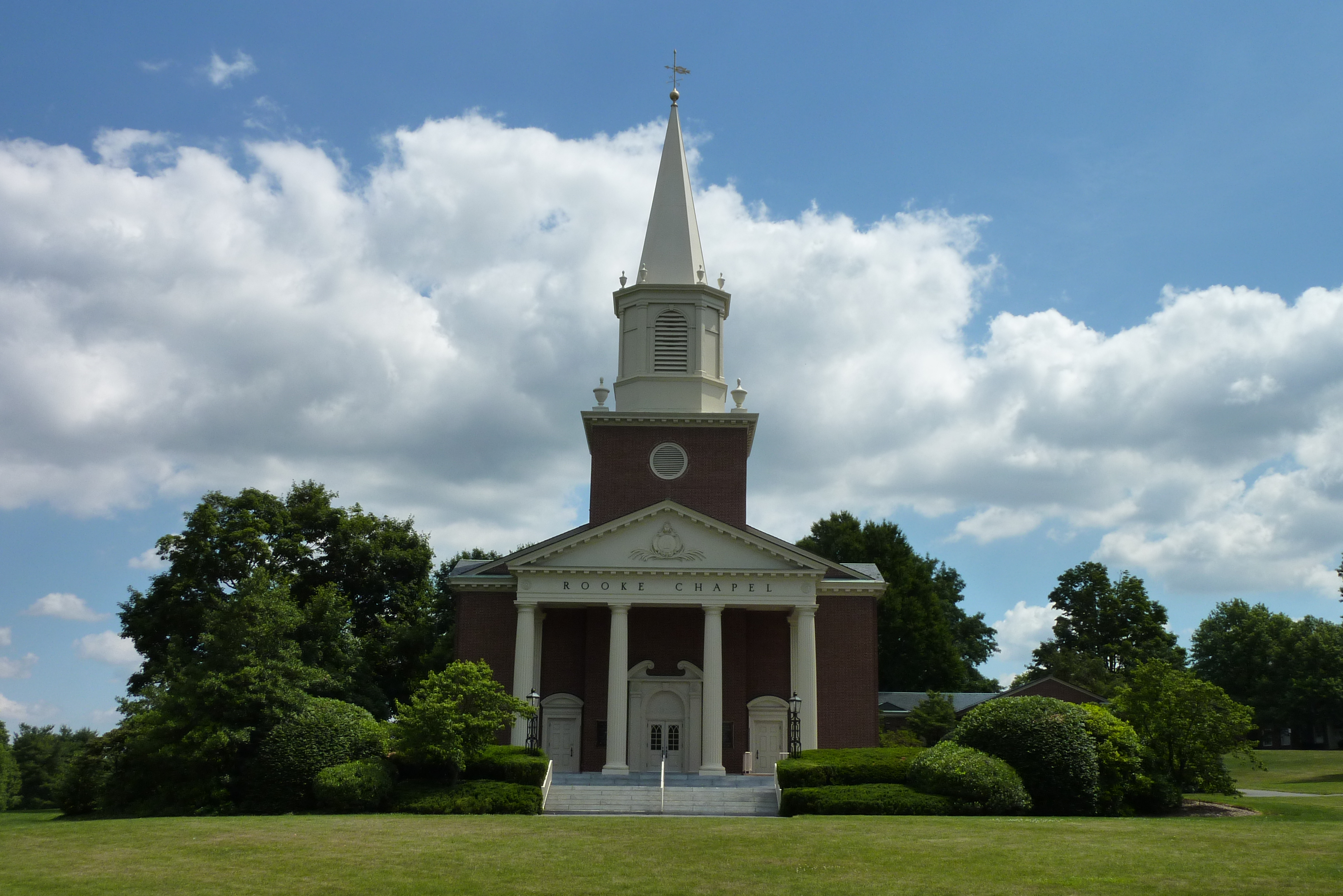
Rooke Chapel on the Bucknell University campus

Rooke married Alice Withington. They had a daughter and two sons.

In the early 1960s, he donated funds to Bucknell University for the construction of Rooke Chapel in memory of his parents. The school's Freas–Rooke Swimming Pool and Freas–Rooke Computer Center are also named for him. To mark his 100th birthday, in 1991, the school dedicated a case studies room, in their Rooke Chemistry Building, to him. Rooke was a university trustee from 1930 to 1975.

Rooke bequeathed funds for the construction of Rooke Hall at Colby–Sawyer College in New London, New Hampshire. His daughter-in-laws, Natalie Davis Rooke and Anastasia Payne Rooke, were Colby–Sawyer alumnae, as was his granddaughter, Marianne Rooke Fairall.

== Death ==
Rooke died in 1994, aged 103, at his home in Palm Beach, Florida. At the time of his death, he was believed to have been the oldest member of the New York Stock Exchange, having begun working there in 1928. He was still working, at Merrill's branch in Morristown, New Jersey, a month before his death.

He was interred in Lewisburg Cemetery, beside his wife, who preceded him in death by eight months, and his parents. The cemetery is located around 0.25 miles (0.40 km) north of the Rooke Chapel.
