= University Avenue (Lewisburg, Pennsylvania) =

Coordinates: 40.95980°N 76.88169°W

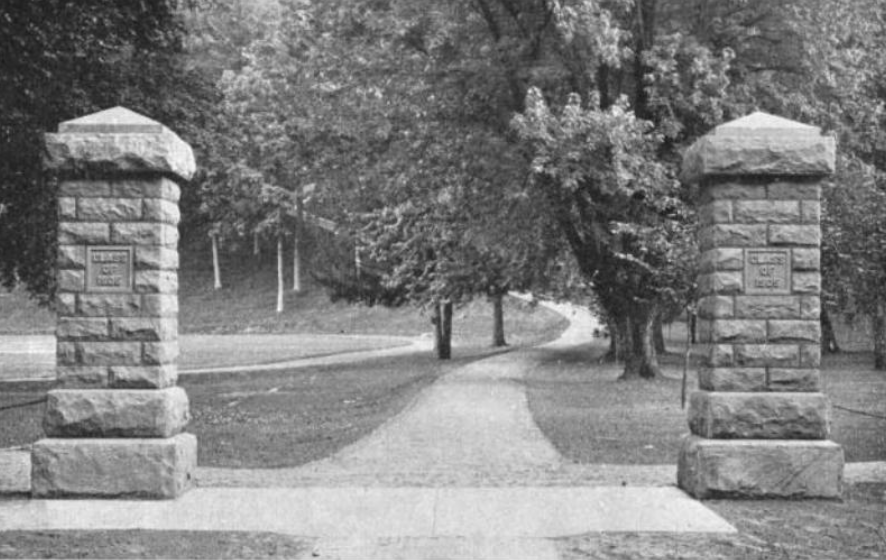
- The 1905 Memorial Gateway, leading into Bucknell University, at the southern end of University Avenue
- Interactive map of University Avenue
- Length: 0.19 mi (0.31 km)
- Location: Lewisburg, Pennsylvania, U.S.
- North end: St. George Street
- South end: Loomis Street

University Avenue is a downtown street in Lewisburg, Pennsylvania, United States. It runs for around 0.19 miles (0.31 km), from St. George Street in the north to Loomis Street in the south. It was the original main access road to the University at Lewisburg (Bucknell University today), located on the northern side of the campus, and still leads to its former main entrance, punctuated by the 1905 Memorial Gateway. The Grove, a wooded area, stands inside the gates.

The university's oldest residence hall, Old Main (today known as Daniel C. Roberts Hall), stands atop College Hill, which begins its rise inside Memorial Gateway. It was built in 1858, when the school was known as the University at Lewisburg, and was rebuilt after fire in the 1930s.

Several fraternity and sorority buildings stand on University Avenue, including Kappa Sigma and Phi Gamma Delta, while President's House is located at the intersection with Loomis Street, across from Lowry House (former home of hymn-writer Robert Lowry). The Union County Industrial Railroad passes beside both of these buildings as it crosses University Avenue.

Limestone Run, a branch of both Bull Run and Miller Run, passes beneath University Avenue in its northern third. It empties into the West Branch Susquehanna River a short distance to the southeast. Its final stretch passes through what was formerly a lush area known as the Meadows.

== Notable addresses ==
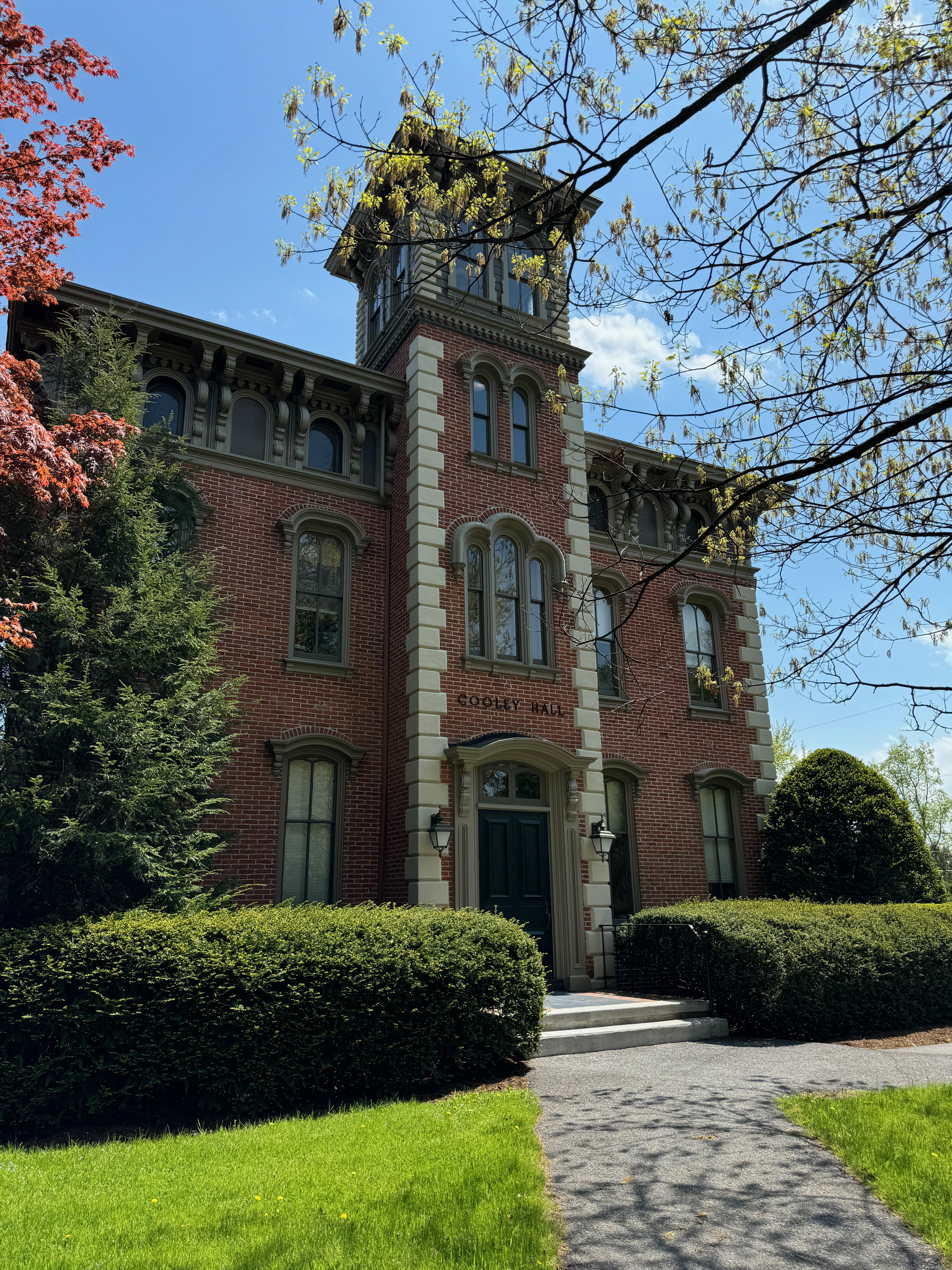
Cooley Hall, 82 University Avenue

From north to south:

- 20 University Avenue
- Residence Hall, 23 University Avenue
- 28 University Avenue (1864)
- Bliss–McClure House, 63 University Avenue
- Kappa Sigma House (formerly), 64 University Avenue
- Phi Gamma Delta House, 78 University Avenue (1915)
- Judd House, 79 University Avenue
- Cooley Hall, 82 University Avenue
- Alumni House, 90 University Avenue
- President's House, 103 University Avenue
- Robert Lowry House, 110 University Avenue

The former carriage house beside the Bliss–McClure House was once a stop on the Underground Railroad. The home was once the residence of George R. Bliss, a professor at Bucknell.

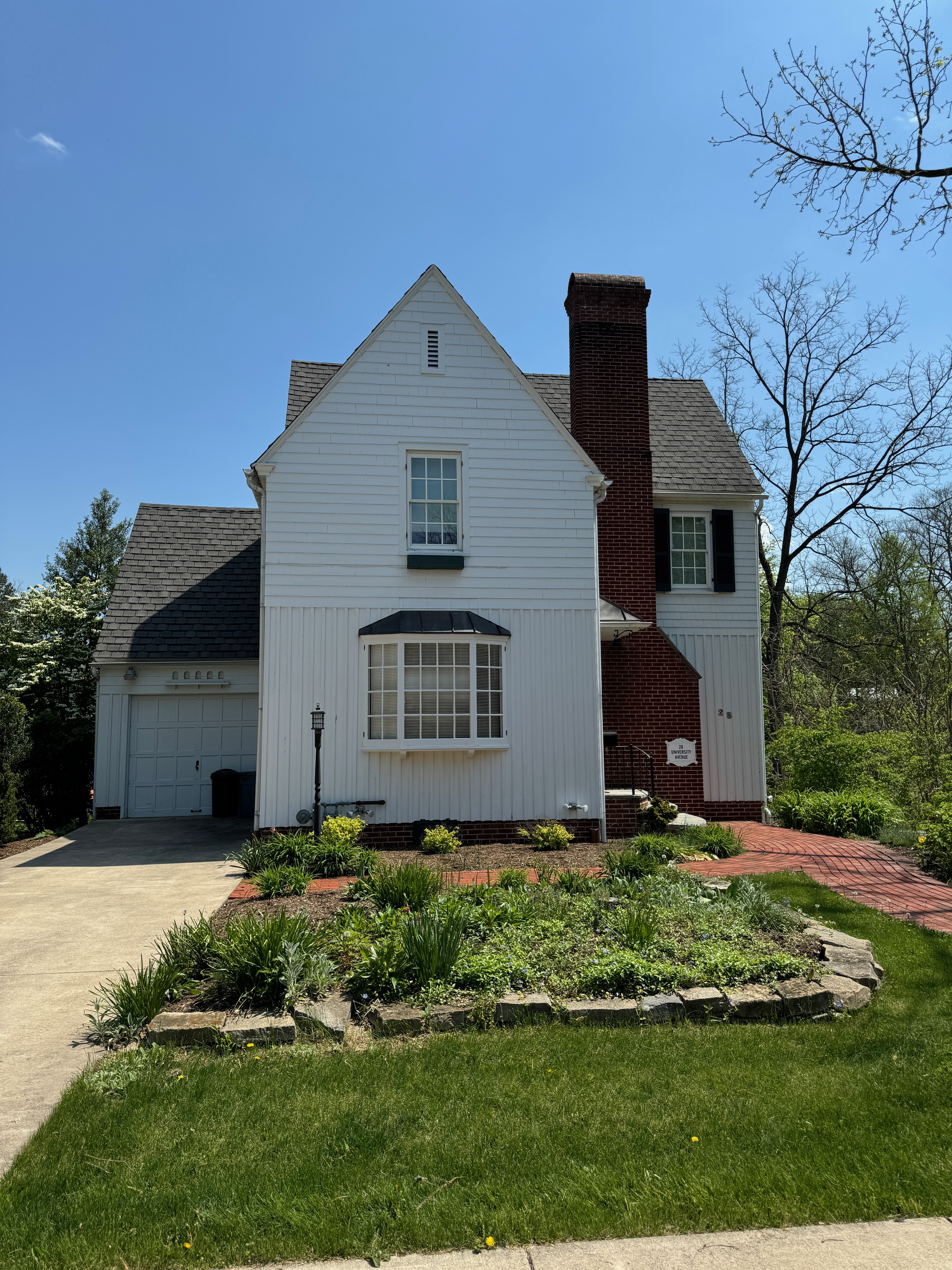
28 University Avenue, built in 1864
