= John Howard Harris =

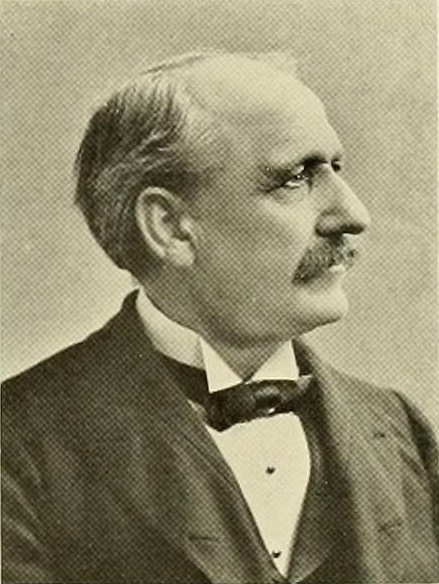
- Harris pictured in L'Agenda 1913, Bucknell yearbook

President of Bucknell University
- In office 1889–1919
- Preceded by: David Jayne Hill
- Succeeded by: Emory William Hunt

Personal details
- Born: April 24, 1847 Indiana County, Pennsylvania
- Died: April 4, 1925 (aged 77) Scranton, Pennsylvania
- Education: University at Lewisburg

John Howard Harris (April 24, 1847 – April 4, 1925) was president of Bucknell University from 1889 to 1919.

== Formative years ==
John Howard Harris was born in Indiana County, Pennsylvania, on April 24, 1847.

Harris began teaching when he was 15 years old; however, he soon left to serve in the American Civil War as a member of Company F of the 2nd Pennsylvania Infantry Regiment. His regiment was sent to guard the B. and O. Railroad in West Virginia, which had been partly destroyed by the Confederates at the time of Lee’s invasion of the North, and was an important artery of traffic. When his term of service ended, he returned to teaching, but because of an urgent appeal for more troops by President Lincoln in August 1864, he returned to the service and became a sergeant in Company H, 206th Pennsylvania Infantry Regiment, which was sent to Richmond, Virginia to hold the Confederates, while Grant worked along the left flank and cut off the city.

Following the war, he obtained a Bachelor of Arts degree from the University at Lewisburg in 1869. While at Bucknell, he was a member of the Theta Alpha honor society and the Sigma Chi fraternity. He received the degree Master of Arts from Bucknell in 1872, and in later years Lafayette College awarded him a Doctor of Philosophy degree. Dickinson and Colgate then each conferred upon him the degree of LL.D., while Bucknell made him a Doctor of Civil Law in 1924.

== Academic career ==
In 1889, Harris was inaugurated as president of Bucknell University, a post he held for thirty years, the longest tenure in the school's history. His presidency saw a large growth in enrollment and expansion of academic buildings and departments.

== Death and legacy ==
Harris died at his home in Scranton, Pennsylvania, on April 4, 1925.

Harris Hall, a dormitory on Bucknell's campus, was named in his honor two years after his death.
