= Emory William Hunt =

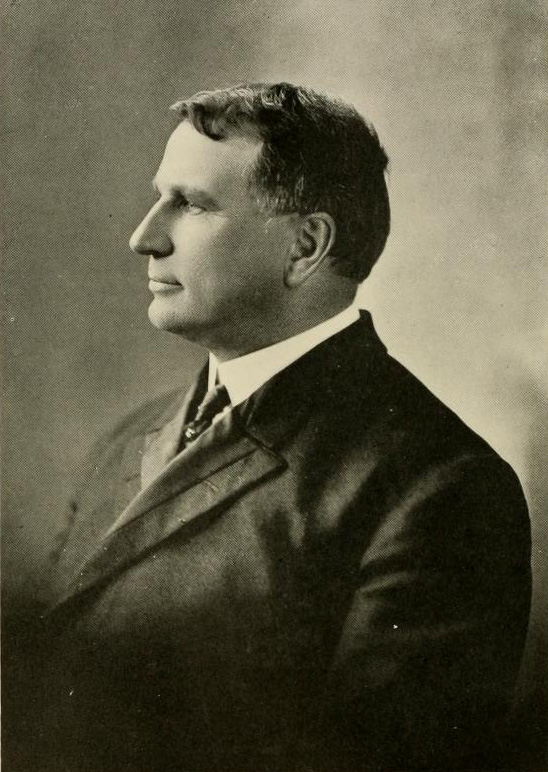
- Hunt pictured in L'Agenda 1921, Bucknell yearbook

President of Bucknell University
- In office 1919–1931
- Preceded by: John Howard Harris
- Succeeded by: Homer Rainey

Personal details
- Born: February 2, 1862 East Clarence, New York
- Died: May 20, 1938 (aged 76) Lewisburg, Pennsylvania

Emory William Hunt (February 2, 1862 – May 20, 1938) was president of Bucknell University from 1919 to 1931.

In February 1928, Hunt Hall, which was named for Hunt, was opened at Bucknell.
