= Malesardi Quadrangle =

Upper quad at Wake Forest University

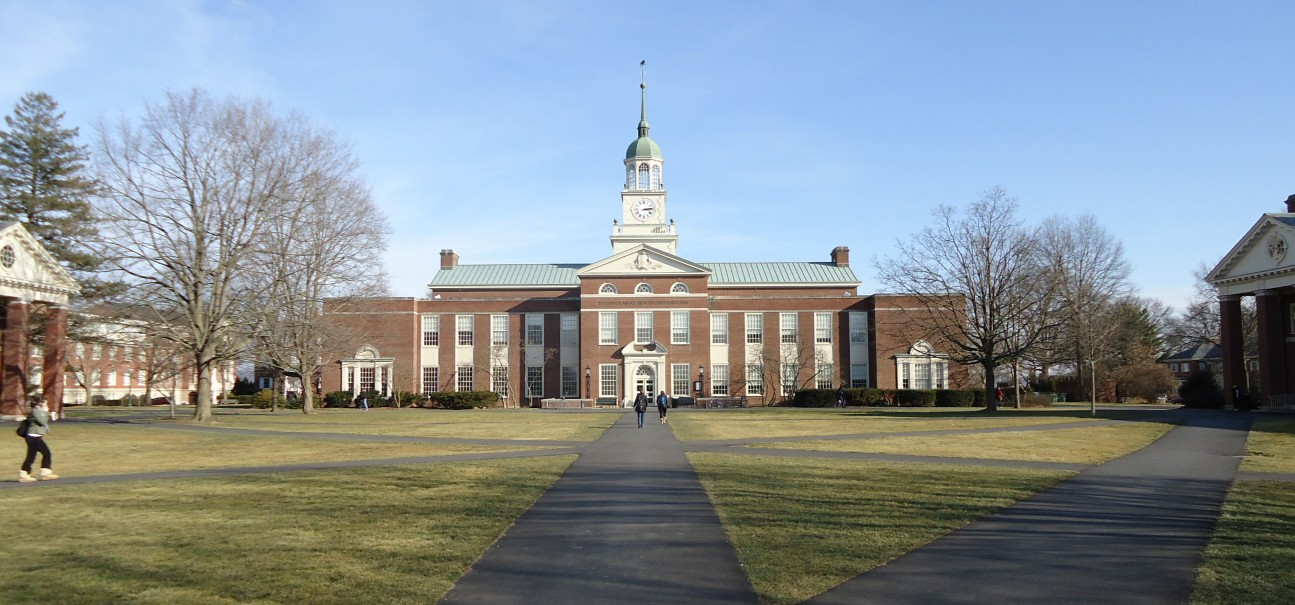
- Looking east across Malesardi Quadrangle to Bertrand Library (2012)
- Interactive map of the Malesardi Quadrangle area
- Former names: Athletic Quadrangle

General information
- Location: Bucknell University, Dent Drive, Lewisburg, Pennsylvania, U.S.
- Coordinates: 40.954760°N 76.883854°W
- Named for: Robert Malesardi (Class of 1945)

Malesardi Quadrangle (formerly known as the Athletic Quadrangle) is a quadrangle at Bucknell University in Lewisburg, Pennsylvania, United States.

Originally known as the Athletic Quadrangle, it was renamed in 2016 after Robert Malesardi, a member of the Class of 1945, pledged $20 million to the college. It was the single-largest gift in the college's history. Malesardi died in 2021, aged 96.

The quadrangle is located on a plateau above Dent Drive to the west. The Freas Hall admissions building is beneath the plaza, accessed from Dent Drive. Vaughan Literature Building overlooks the quadrangle from the north, Bertrand Library and clocktower from the east, and Coleman Hall from the south. From the quad, the Susquehanna Valley is in view to the west.

Senior Sunsets and Commencements take place on the quad.

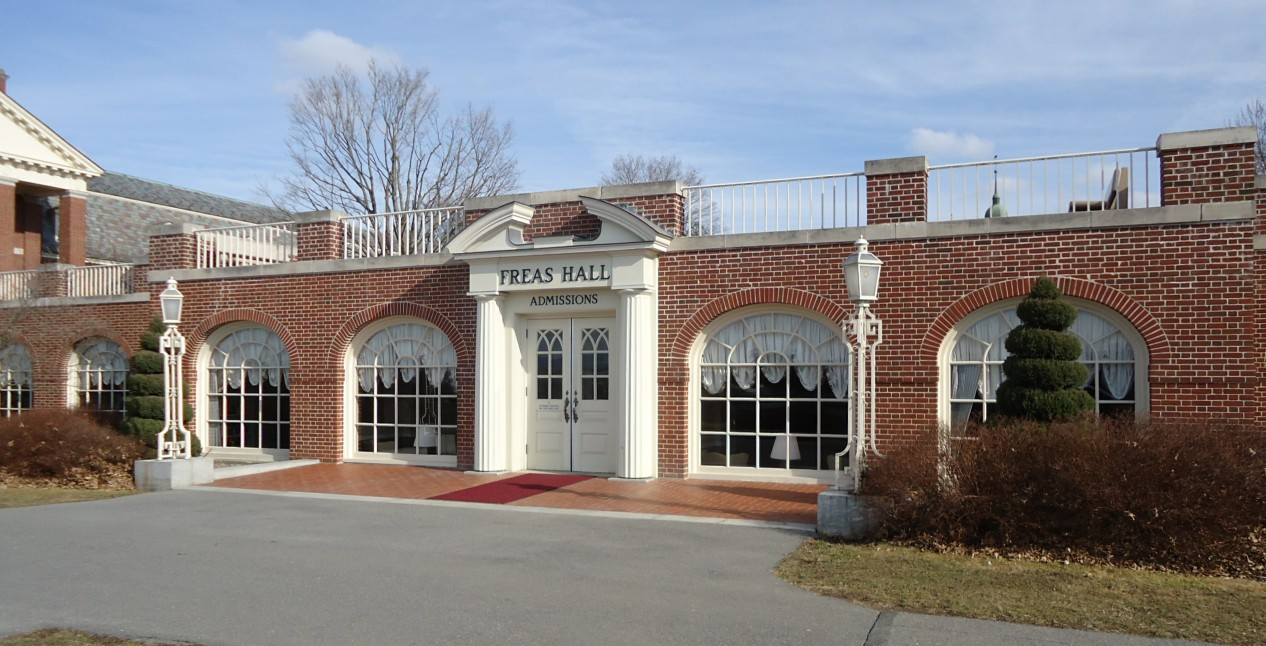
Freas Hall sits below the quadrangle

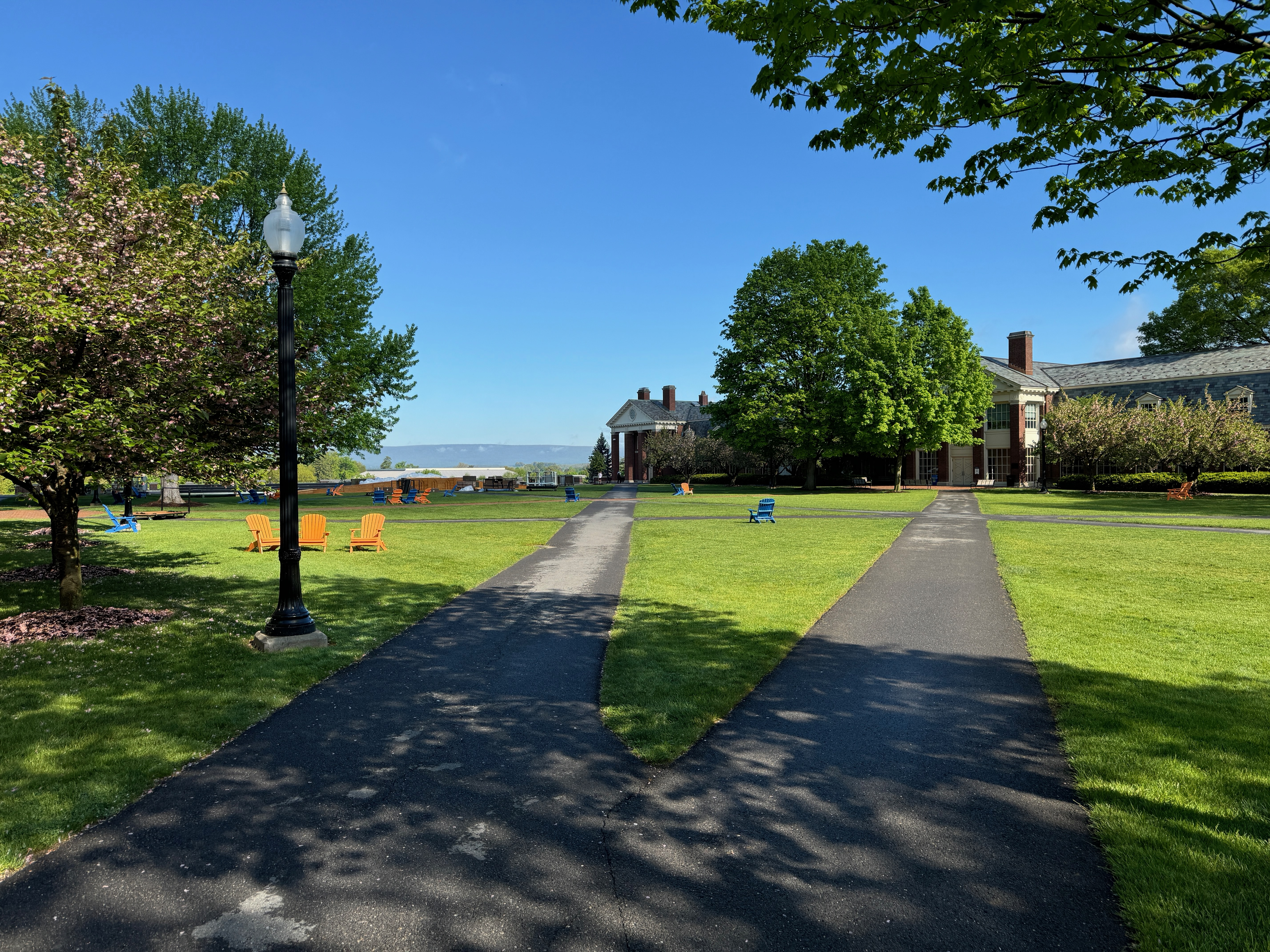
Looking northwest toward the Vaughan Literature Building (2024)
