= President's House (Bucknell University) =

- Interactive map of the President's House area

General information
- Location: Lewisburg, Pennsylvania, U.S., 1013 University Avenue
- Coordinates: 40.9588°N 76.8819°W
- Opened: 1855 (171 years ago)

The President's House is a building in Lewisburg, Pennsylvania, United States. It was built in 1855 by Reverend Justin R. Loomis, Professor of Natural Sciences at the University at Lewisburg (now Bucknell University) and the school's president. The home, which stands at the corner of University Avenue and Loomis Street, was purchased by the school in 1878. Its first occupant from that point was David J. Hill, who became the school's president in 1879.

In 1888, two years after the school was renamed Bucknell University, the trustees considered constructing a new President's House, but instead decided to remodel the extant structure. It was designed by Wilson Brothers and Company of Philadelphia, and William Bucknell donated $5,000 toward the project. Elms and other trees were planted in the garden by acting president Dr. George G. Groff in 1889.

The home was modernized in 1964. A glassed-in family room was added behind the house (when viewed from University Avenue), facing Bucknell Hall. It was surrounded by an extensive terrace with shrubbery. Twenty years later, the building's exterior was sandblasted to restore its original red brick. It original trim was also restored.

In the 21st century, the home's sunroom was demolished and updated.
