= John C. Bravman =

American academic administrator

John Bravman
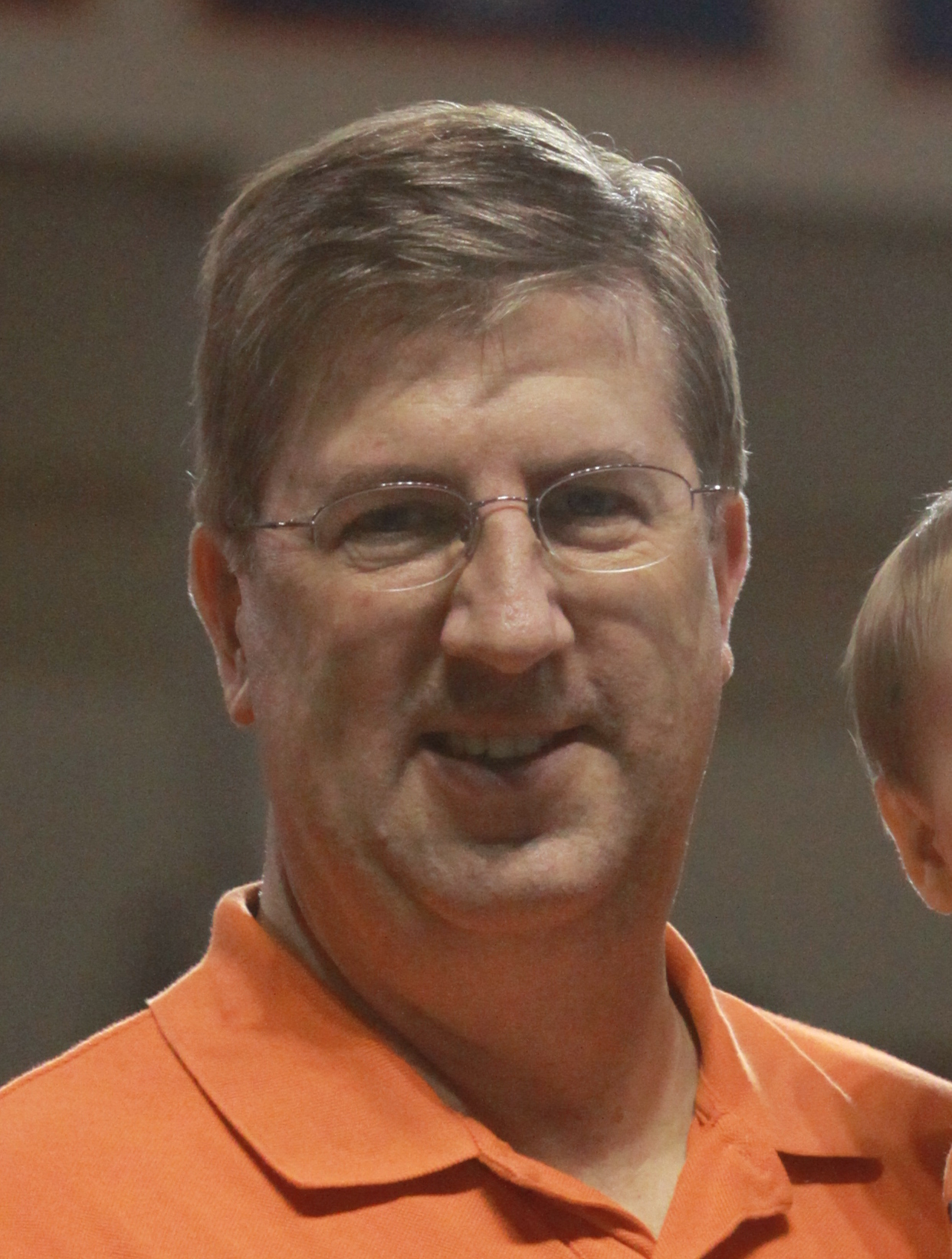
- Bravman in 2011

President of Bucknell University
- Incumbent
- Assumed office July 1, 2010
- Preceded by: Brian C. Mitchell

Personal details
- Born: 1957 (age 67–68); New York City, New York, U.S.
- Education: Stanford University (BS, MS, PhD)

John C. Bravman is an American academic administrator who is currently serving as the 17th president of Bucknell University. He came to Bucknell after a 35-year career at Stanford University, where he served as the Freeman-Thornton Vice Provost for Undergraduate Education, Dean of the Freshman and Sophomore College, and Bing Centennial Professor of Materials Science and Engineering. He also serves as the chair of the board of directors at Geisinger Health System.

== Career ==
Bravman earned a Bachelor of Science, Master of Science, and Ph.D. degree from Stanford University in materials science & engineering. At a Stanford undergrad, Bravman became a member of Delta Kappa Epsilon fraternity (Sigma Rho chapter). Bravman has received several awards, including the Gores Award for Excellence in Teaching, Stanford University's highest honor for teaching.

During the earliest months of his presidency, Bravman initiated an examination of the quality of student life by establishing the Campus Climate Task Force. This group of faculty, staff, and students was charged with assessment of student views and actions related to personal responsibility and, as appropriate, recommending ways to encourage the most positive university experience for students.

From 2012 to 2017 Bravman led the largest financing campaign in Bucknell's history and achieved and surpassed the goal of $500 million to benefit the university.

In January 2013 Bravman announced that the university had discovered reporting errors in student SAT test scores from 2006 through 2012, which resulted in Bucknell reporting scores to various organizations as higher than they actually were. Bravman also revealed the misreporting of ACT scores, and that the reported scores were lower than they actually were. Bravman implemented new procedures to review data before reporting to outside organizations. After recalculating its published rankings using the corrected information, U.S. News & World Report concluded that the difference between Bucknell's misreported data and newly reported data was not significant enough to change the school's numerical rank.

== Personal life ==
Bravman is married to Wendelin Wright, a mechanical engineering professor at Bucknell.
