= 7th Street (Lewisburg, Pennsylvania) =

Street in Lewisburg, Pennsylvania, United States

Coordinates: 40.96182°N 76.88919°W

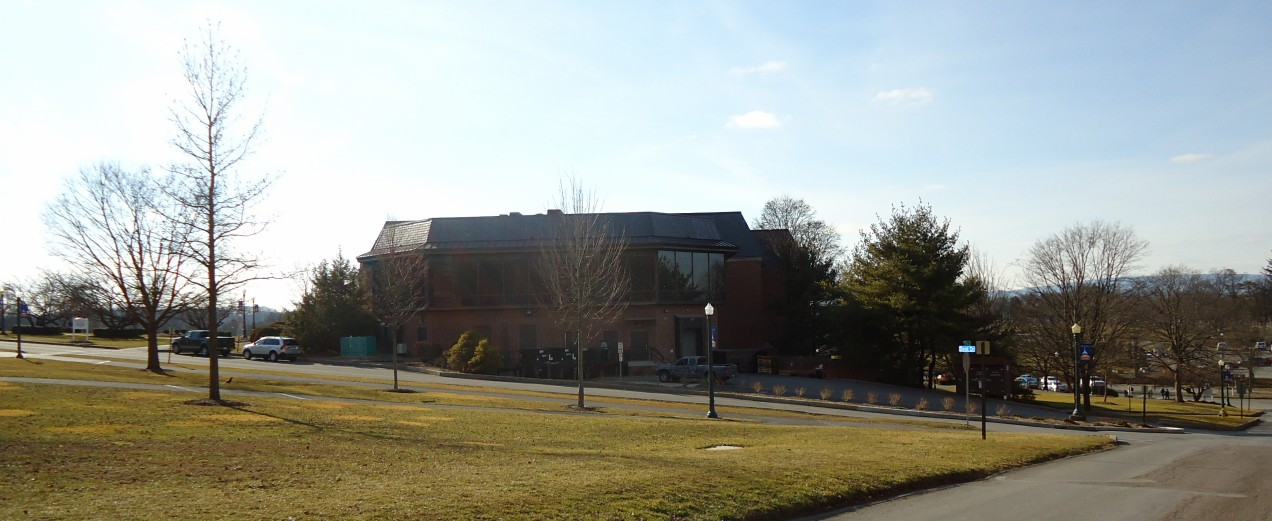
- Bucknell University's Weis Center for the Performing Arts, viewed from South 7th Street
- Interactive map of 7th Street
- Length: 1.06 mi (1.71 km)
- Location: Lewisburg, Pennsylvania, U.S.
- Northwest end: North 10th Street
- Major junctions: PA 45
- Southeast end: River Road

7th Street is a downtown street in Lewisburg, Pennsylvania, United States. It runs for around 1.06 miles (1.71 km), from North 10th Street in the northwest to River Road in the southeast. North of its intersection with Market Street (Pennsylvania Route 45), it is named North 7th Street; south of it, it is South 7th Street. From the West Branch Susquehanna River inland, Market Street's cross streets are numbered 2 through 8, with Front Street replacing what was originally 1st Street. Lewisburg's street layout was designed by Ludwig Derr in 1785, and is believed to have been inspired by that of Philadelphia.

As well as passing through downtown Lewisburg, 7th Street bisects the heart of the Bucknell University campus.

In 2024, Lewisburg Neighborhoods, a non-profit community development organization, was awarded around $5 million to improve the streetscapes of 7th Street, South 5th Street and the Bull Run Greenway.

== Route ==
North 7th Street begins at an intersection with North 10th Street, a few yards short of the latter's terminus at Buffalo Road (Pennsylvania Route 192). Continuing southeasterly, North 7th Street crosses North Derr Drive (U.S. Route 15). Entering downtown Lewisburg, it forms the southwestern boundary of Green Park, beside which it crosses Bull Run. A short distance later, North 7th Street crosses Market Street (Pennsylvania Route 45), at which point it becomes South 7th Street. At South Catharine Street, it forms the northeastern boundary of Lewisburg Cemetery. Three blocks later, at ROTC Drive, South 7th Street enters the campus of Bucknell University.

=== Bucknell University ===
After crossing Miller Run, South 7th Street continues into the Bucknell campus, crossing an intersection with Moore Avenue and Walker Street, then, as it climbs the hill to the Upper Campus, Dent Drive. Beyond the Carnegie Building, a cresting South 7th Street passes Fraternity Road and Snake Road, before exiting the campus at its eastern edge as it passes South Campus Drive. The road terminates a short distance later at River Road, on the western banks of the West Branch Susquehanna River.

The headquarters of the university's student newspaper, The Bucknellian, are located in Stuck House on South 7th Street.

Between 1908 and 1973, The College Inn stood at the intersection of South 7th Street and Snake Road.

== Notable addresses ==
From north to south (eastern side):

- Green Park
- Smith Hall (Bucknell University)
- Stuck House (Bucknell University)

Western side:

- Lewisburg Cemetery
- O'Leary Center (Bucknell University)
