= G. Dennis O'Brien =

American philosopher

8th President of the University of Rochester
- In office July 1, 1984 – June 30, 1994
- Preceded by: Robert Lamb Sproull
- Succeeded by: Thomas H. Jackson

Personal details
- Born: February 21, 1931 (age 95) Chicago, Illinois, U.S.
- Education: Yale University (BA); University of Chicago (PhD)

George Dennis O'Brien (born February 21, 1931) is an American philosopher who served as the eighth President of the University of Rochester.

== Life and career ==
O'Brien was born in Chicago, Illinois, to a medical doctor and a nurse. His father was also a medical examiner and the young O'Brien accompanied him to autopsies he performed at local funeral homes. He attended St. Philip Neri grammar school and Leo Catholic High School.

O'Brien earned a B.A. in English at Yale University in 1952 and a Ph.D. in philosophy at the University of Chicago in 1961. While in graduate school, he took an instructorship at Princeton University, where he became assistant professor after graduating. He began his career as administrator when he took on the role of Assistant Dean of the College at Princeton and then moved to Middlebury College where he took on successively more responsibilities.

In 1976, Bucknell University tapped O'Brien to become its twelfth president. In 1984, he assumed the presidency of the University of Rochester.

At UR, he introduced several innovations, including the "Take Five" program, the Rochester Conference, which brought high-profile speakers to the River Campus from 1987 to 1990, and a weekly University Day to bring faculty and undergraduates together for interchange of ideas. He also kicked off a major fund-raising campaign to fund more competitive compensation for faculty.

O'Brien also dealt with several controversies, notably the ill-fated idea to raise the possibility of renaming UR to "Rochester University" or "Eastman Rochester University". In 1987, he had to deal with the fallout from William E. Simon Graduate School of Business Administration's rescinding the admission of a Fujifilm employee to its MBA program after senior Eastman Kodak officials voiced their concern that they would have to pull their executives out of the same program to prevent the possibility of industrial espionage. O'Brien also divested the University from South Africa after student protests.

After retiring from UR in 1994, he served as chair of the Commonweal Foundation and on the board of La Salle University. He also served as an accreditation reviewer and chair for several institutions of higher learning in the United States.

== Selected works ==
- Hegel on Reason and History: A Contemporary Interpretation, Chicago, Illinois: University of Chicago Press, 1975, ISBN 978-0-226-61646-9, OCLC 1420006
- God and the New Haven Railway and Why Neither One Is Doing Very Well, Boston, Massachusetts: Beacon Press, 1986, ISBN 978-0-8070-1010-5, OCLC 14099898
- What to Expect from College: A University President's Guide for Students and Parents, New York, New York: St. Martin's Press, 1991, ISBN 978-0-312-06436-5, OCLC 23900652
- All the Essential Half-truths about Higher Education, Chicago, Illinois: University of Chicago Press, 1998, ISBN 978-0-226-61654-4, OCLC 36776433
- The Church and Abortion: A Catholic Dissent, Lanham, Maryland: Rowman & Littlefield, 2010, ISBN 978-1-4422-0577-2, OCLC 606404177
