= Bucknell University =

Private college in Lewisburg, Pennsylvania, U.S.

- Former names: University at Lewisburg (1846–1886)
- Type: Private liberal arts college
- Established: 1846 (180 years ago)
- Endowment: $1.26 billion (2025)
- President: John C. Bravman
- Academic staff: 442
- Undergraduates: 3,928
- Postgraduates: 47
- Location: Lewisburg, Pennsylvania address, U.S. 40°57′17″N 76°53′01″W
- Campus: 450 acres (1.8 km^{2})
- Colors: Blue and orange
- Nickname: Bison
- Sporting affiliations: NCAA Division I (FCS) Patriot League CWPA
- Mascot: Bucky the Bison
- Website: www.bucknell.edu

Bucknell University is a private liberal-arts college in Lewisburg, Pennsylvania, United States. Founded in 1846 as the University at Lewisburg, it consists of the College of Arts and Sciences, the Freeman College of Management, and the College of Engineering. It offers 65 majors and 70 minors in the sciences and humanities. Located just south of Lewisburg, the 445-acre (1.80 km^{2}) campus rises above the West Branch of the Susquehanna River.

Approximately 3,900 undergraduate students and 50 graduate students attend Bucknell. It is a member of the Patriot League in NCAA Division I athletics. Its athletic teams are the Bucknell Bison and its mascot is Bucky the Bison.

== History ==
=== Founding and early years ===
Founded in 1846 as the University at Lewisburg, Bucknell traces its origin to a group of Baptists from White Deer Valley Baptist Church who deemed it "desirable that a Literary Institution should be established in Central Pennsylvania, embracing a High School for male pupils, another for females, a College and also a Theological Institution."

The group's efforts for the institution began to crystallize in 1845, when Stephen William Taylor, a professor at Madison University (now Colgate University) in Hamilton, New York, was asked to prepare a charter and act as general agent for the development of the institution. The charter for the University at Lewisburg, granted by the Pennsylvania General Assembly and approved by the governor on February 5, 1846, carried one stipulation–that $100,000 ($3,600,000 today) be raised before the new institution would be granted full corporate status.

In 1846, the "school preparatory to the University" opened in the basement of the First Baptist Church in Lewisburg. Known originally as the Lewisburg High School, it became in 1848 the Academic and Primary Department of the University at Lewisburg.

The school's first commencement was held on August 20, 1851, for a graduation class of seven men. Among the board members attending was James Buchanan, who would become the 15th President of the United States. Stephen Taylor officiated as his last act before assuming office as president of Madison University. One day earlier, the trustees had elected Howard Malcom as the first president of the institution, a post he held for six years.

=== Female Institute ===
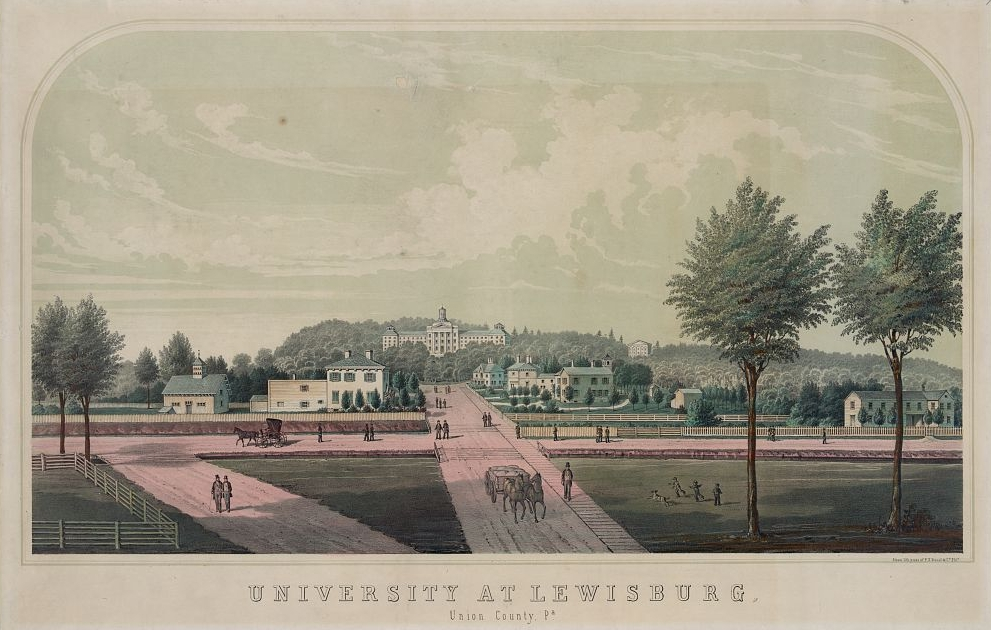
The University at Lewisburg (1870s), with Old Main sat atop College Hill

Although the Female Institute began instruction in 1852, it wasn't until 1883 that college courses were opened to women. Bucknell, though, was committed to equal educational opportunities for women. This commitment was reflected in the words of David Jayne Hill of the Class of 1874, and president of the college from 1879 to 1888: "We need in Pennsylvania, in the geographical centre of the state, a University, not in the German but in the American sense, where every branch of non-professional knowledge can be pursued, regardless of distinction of sex. I have no well-matured plan to announce as to the sexes; but the Principal of the Female Seminary proposes to inaugurate a course for females equal to that pursued at Vassar; the two sexes having equal advantages, though not reciting together." Within five years of opening, enrollment had grown so sharply that the college built a new hall–Larison Hall–to accommodate the Female Institute.

=== Benefactor William Bucknell ===
In 1881, facing dire financial circumstances, the college turned to William Bucknell, a charter member of the board of trustees, for help. His donation of $50,000 ($1,670,000 today) saved the college from ruin. In 1886, in recognition of Bucknell's support of the college, the trustees voted unanimously to change the name of the University at Lewisburg to Bucknell University. Bucknell Hall, the first of several buildings given to the institution by Bucknell, was initially a chapel and for more than a half century the site of student theatrical and musical performances. Today, it houses the Stadler Center for Poetry.

=== Continued expansion ===
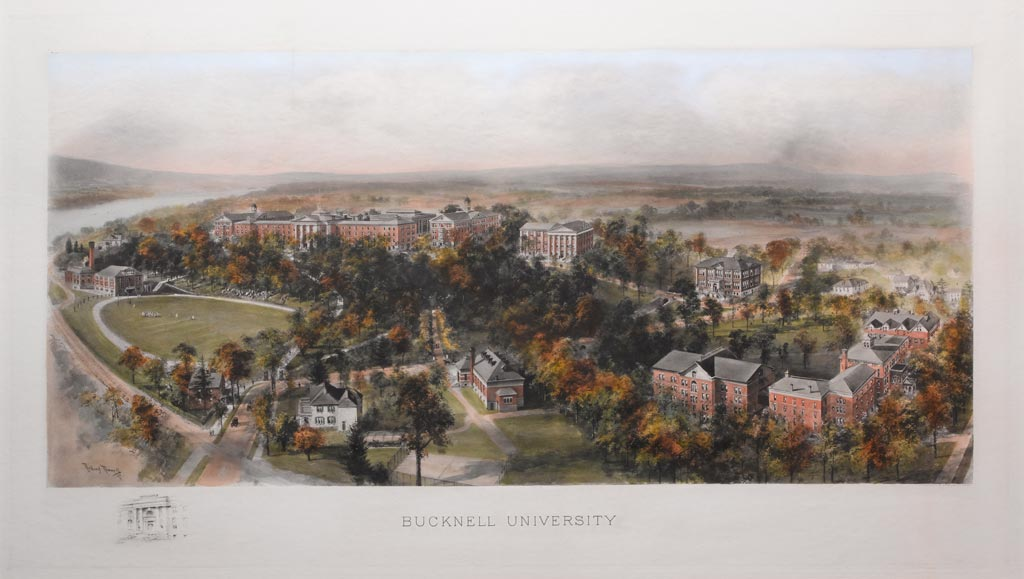
Bucknell campus in 1907

The 40 years from 1890 until 1930 saw a steady increase in the number of faculty members and students. When the Depression brought a drop in enrollment in 1933, several members of the faculty were "loaned" to found a new institution: Bucknell Junior College in Wilkes-Barre, Pennsylvania. Today, that institution is a four-year university, Wilkes University, independent of Bucknell since 1947. The depression era also saw the commissioning by President Homer Rainey (1931–35) of architect Jens Larson to design Bucknell's master plan. Subsequent expansion of the institution still largely adheres to this plan.

The post-War period saw a dramatic increase in higher education enrollment across the United States, thanks first to the G.I. Bill and then to the baby boom. Like other institutions, Bucknell's campus grew to accommodate a growing student body, and the college broke ground on many of the academic buildings that comprise upper campus. Chief among these is the Ellen Clarke Bertrand Library, commissioned in 1946 under Bucknell President and former Governor of Maine Horace Hildreth and opened in 1951. Other major additions from the building spree of the 1950s and 60s include the Olin Science Building and Coleman, Marts and Swartz Halls.

=== Building for the future ===
A growing reputation and changing expectations for undergraduate education in the United States called for improved facilities. The 1970s brought construction of the Elaine Langone Center, the Gerhard Fieldhouse and the Computer Center. In the 1980s, the capacity of Bertrand Library was doubled, facilities for engineering were substantially renovated, and the Weis Center for the Performing Arts was inaugurated.

Heading into the 21st century, new facilities for the sciences included the renovation of the Olin Science Building, the construction of the Rooke Chemistry Building in 1990 and a new Biology Building in 1991. The Weis Music Building was inaugurated in 2000, the O'Leary Building for Psychology and Geology opened in the fall of 2002, the new Kenneth Langone Recreational Athletic Center opened in 2003 and the Breakiron Engineering Building in 2004.

The campus further expanded to its south, as the Academic complex (comprising Academic West and East) opened in 2013 and 2019, respectively. Holmes Hall, the new home for the Freeman College of Management, opened in 2021.

=== COVID-19 pandemic ===
On March 10, 2020, President Bravman announced the spring 2020 semester would be completed via remote learning due to the COVID-19 pandemic. The fall 2020 and spring 2021 semesters were completed with students and faculty onsite.

== Campus ==
Much of the university property is in East Buffalo Township. A portion is in the borough limits of Lewisburg.

=== Grounds ===
Bucknell's 450-acre (180 ha) campus comprises more than 100 buildings located over a gentle rise adjacent to the West Branch Susquehanna River. The campus is divided into Lower Campus and Upper Campus by Miller Run and the Grove, a stand of oak trees that ascends the slope. Lower Campus consists primarily of student housing and the institution's sports facilities. Upper Campus mainly contains academic buildings. It offers views northwest across the Buffalo Valley toward Mount Nittany and southeast across the Susquehanna River toward Montour Ridge. Bucknell's campus forms a cohesive architectural ensemble due to the sustained use of brick and the recurrent themes of Georgian style. The institution's first building, Taylor Hall, was constructed in 1848. The oldest residential hall on the campus is Daniel C. Roberts Hall (originally known as Old Main in 1858). Its newest academic building, Holmes Hall, was inaugurated in 2021.

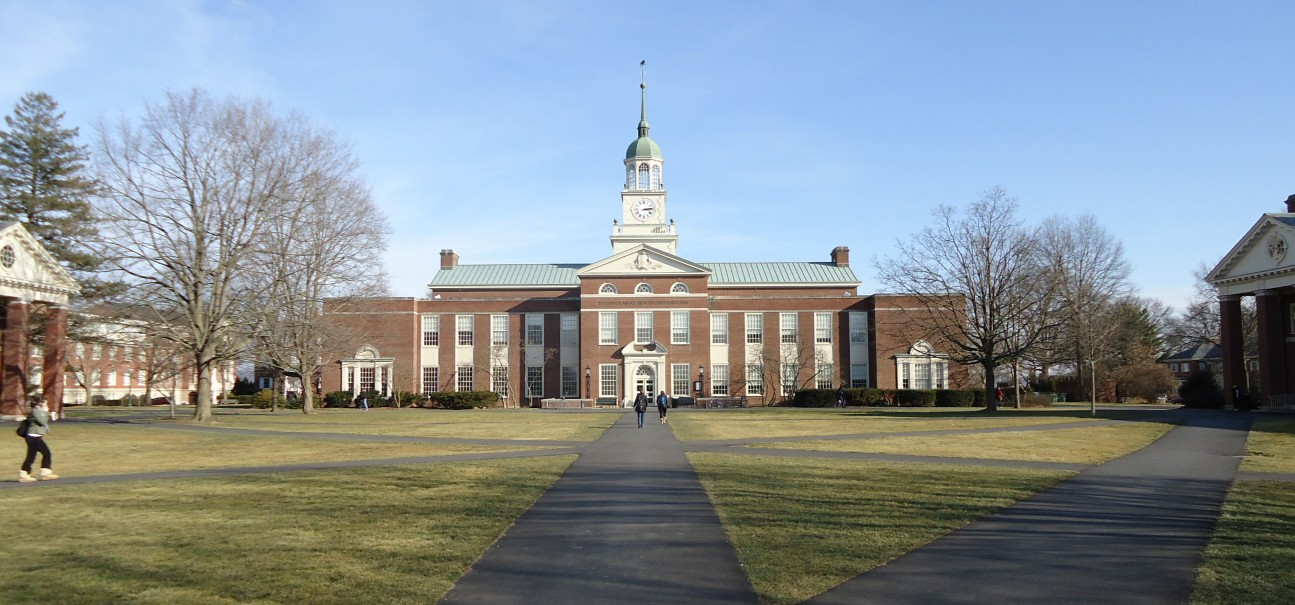
Malesardi Quadrangle

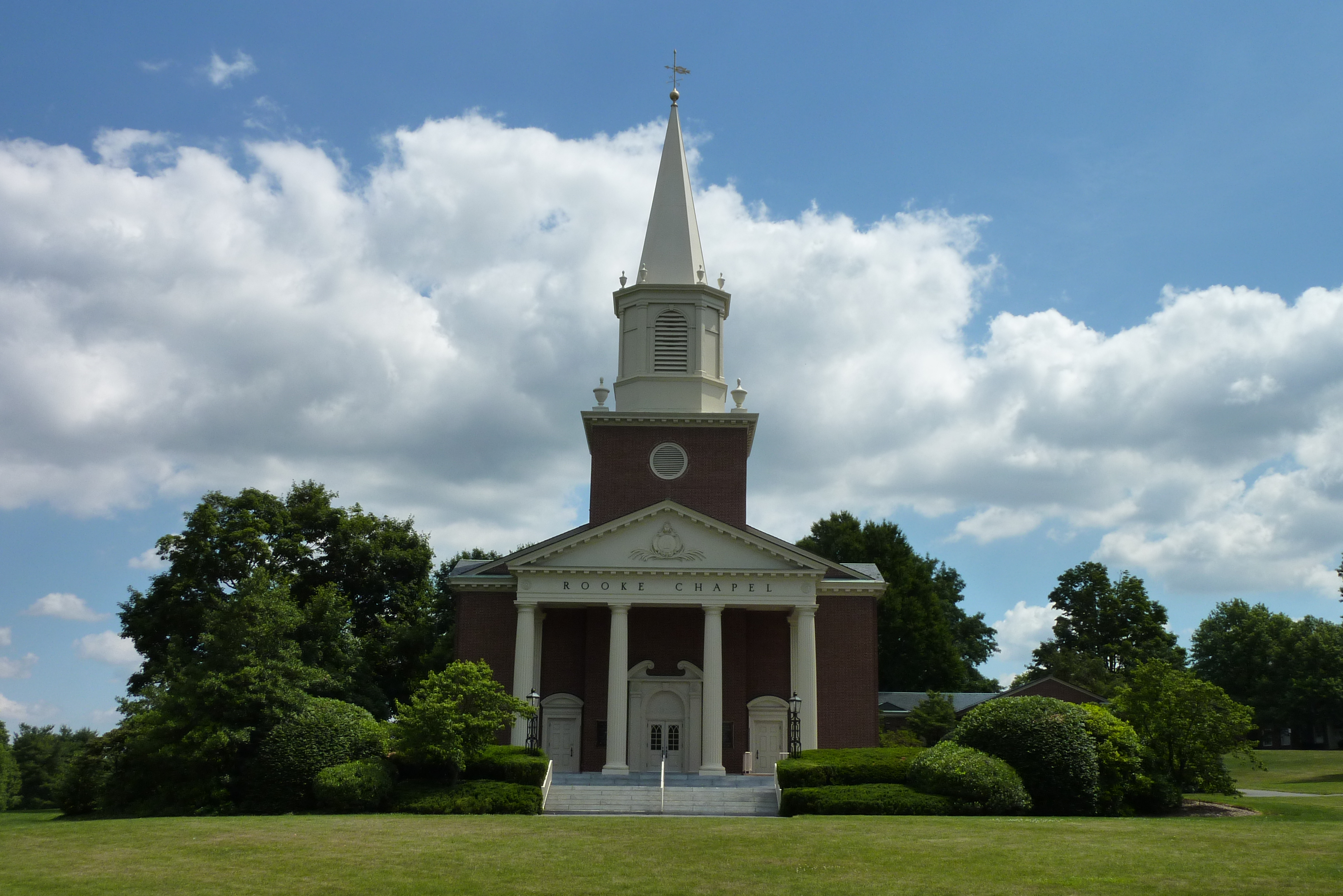
Rooke Chapel

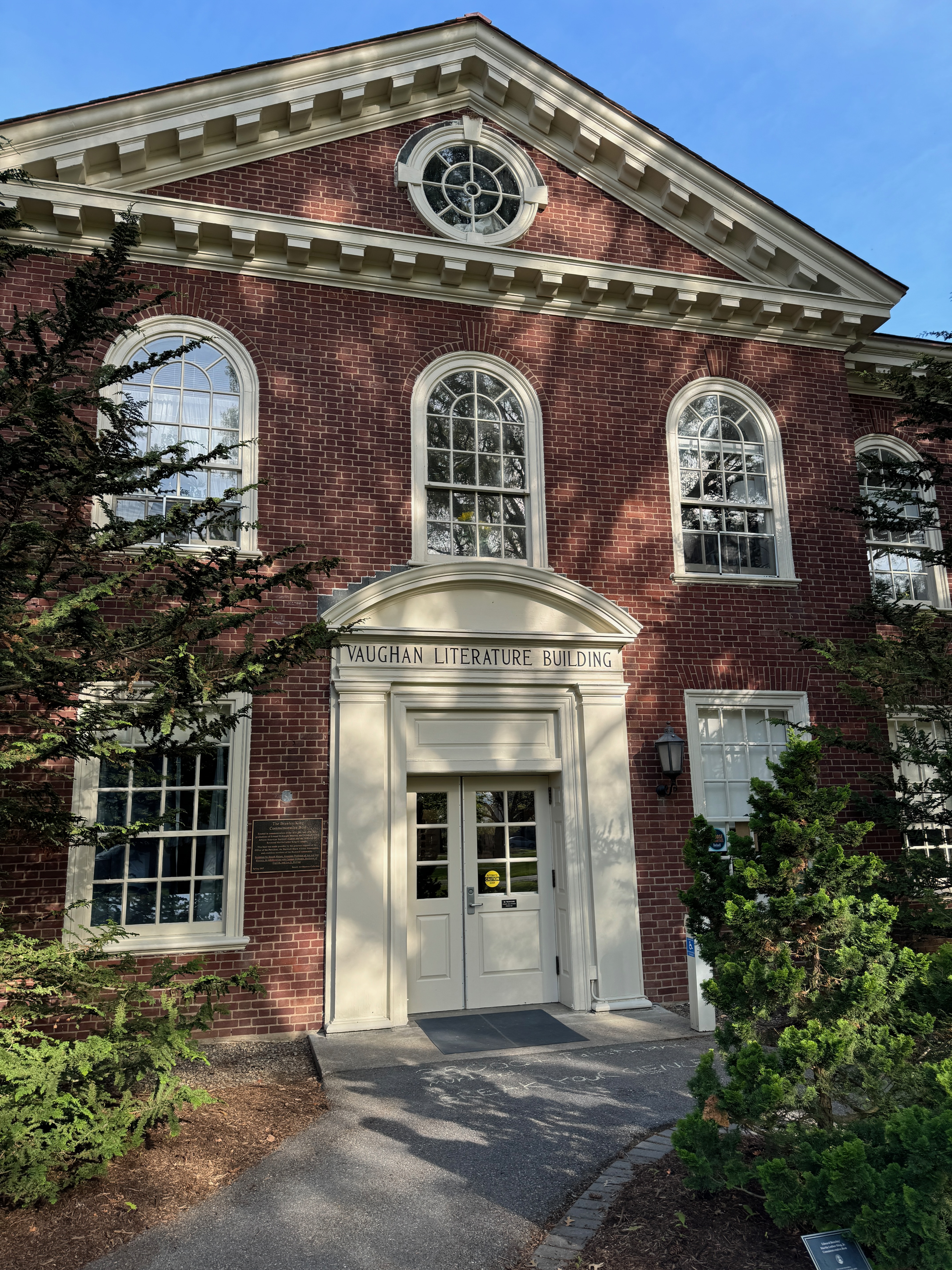
Vaughan Literature Building

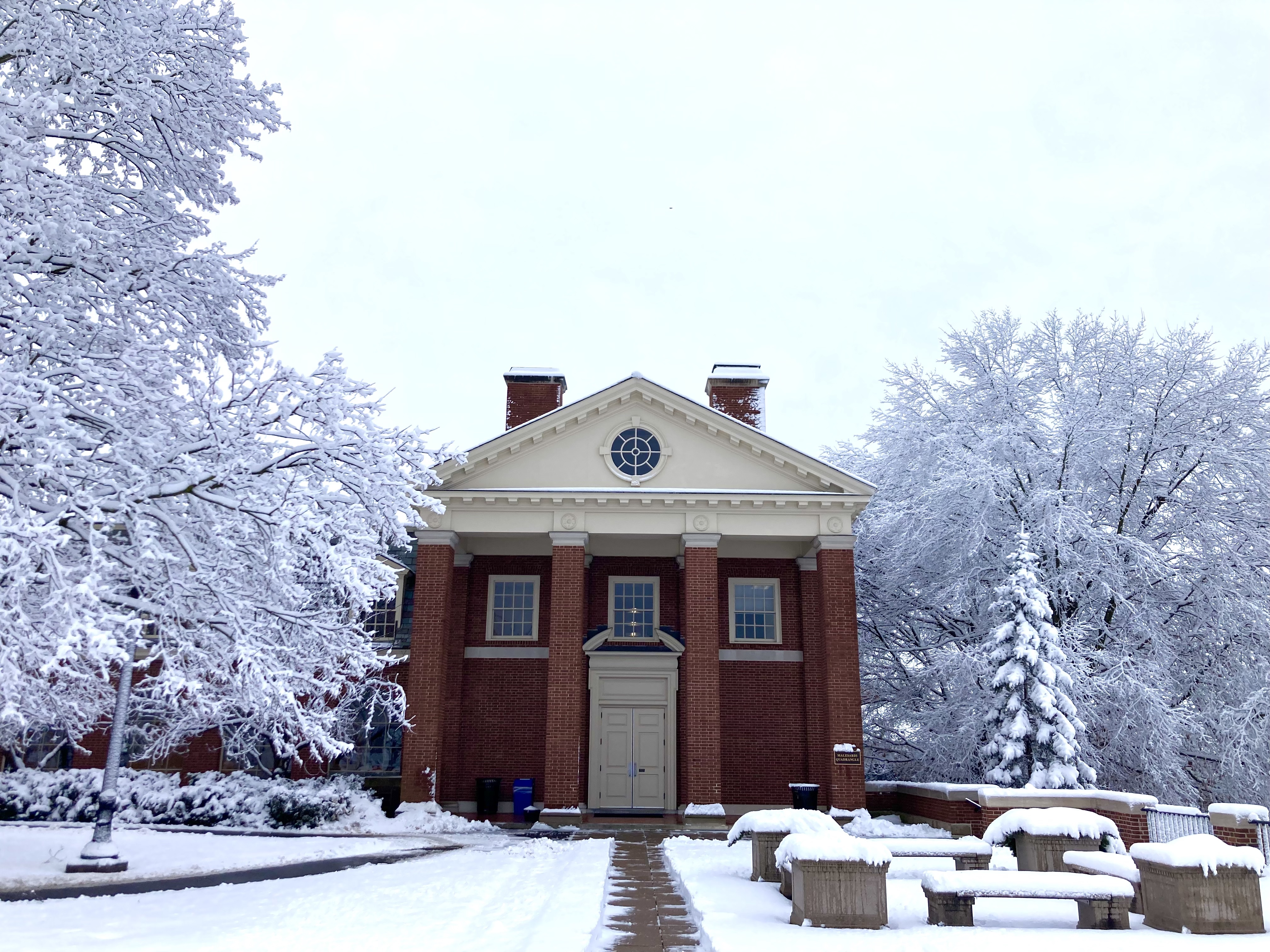
Coleman Hall in winter

=== Non-academic facilities ===
Rooke Chapel is the non-denominational setting for campus worship, weddings, and celebrations, opened in 1964. The chapel was a gift of Robert Levi Rooke (class of 1913), a member of the board of trustees.

Christy Mathewson–Memorial Stadium is a 13,100-seat multi-purpose stadium built in 1924 and renovated in 1989, when it was also renamed in honor of Christy Mathewson (class of 1902), a New York Giants Hall of Fame pitcher.

The Bucknell Farm was established in 2018, building on the success of the Lewisburg Community Garden, a partnership between Bucknell University and the Borough of Lewisburg. The 5-acre (2.0 ha) organic farm overlooking Montour Ridge offers learning and service opportunities for students and provides fresh, local produce for the institution's dining system. Along with a 1.76-megawatt solar array installed in 2022, the farm reflects Bucknell's commitment to achieving carbon neutrality by 2030 and long-term environmental sustainability.

Bucknell Greenhouse is located on the fourth floor of the Biology portion of the Rooke Science Center. In 2023, the Century Plant (Agave americana) bloomed for the first time in thirty years. The greenhouse contains three ecosystems: a desert, wetlands, and tropical and temperate forests.

In 2023, the school began the first part of the Bucknell Greenway, what will be a 4-mile (6.4 km) educational recreation path around campus, while also connecting to the athletic fields across U.S. Route 15.

Spratt House is the home of the institution's Army Reserve Officer Training Corps (ROTC) program.

== Academics ==
Bucknell has a total enrollment of around 3,950 undergraduate and fifty graduate students. With around 400 faculty, the faculty to student ratio is 1:9, with the average class size of approximately twenty students. Bucknell has traditionally had strong engineering programs. With the addition for the Freeman College of Management in 2017, Bucknell offers a balance of foundational liberal-arts study and pre-professional training, a statistic reflected in the 25% of students who choose to double major. In 2021, the largest majors were Accounting and Finance (79 graduates), Political Science and Government (76 graduates), and Economics (67 graduates). For the years between 2015 and 2021, 18% of students reported pursuing post-graduate study within nine months of graduating.

=== College of Arts and Sciences ===
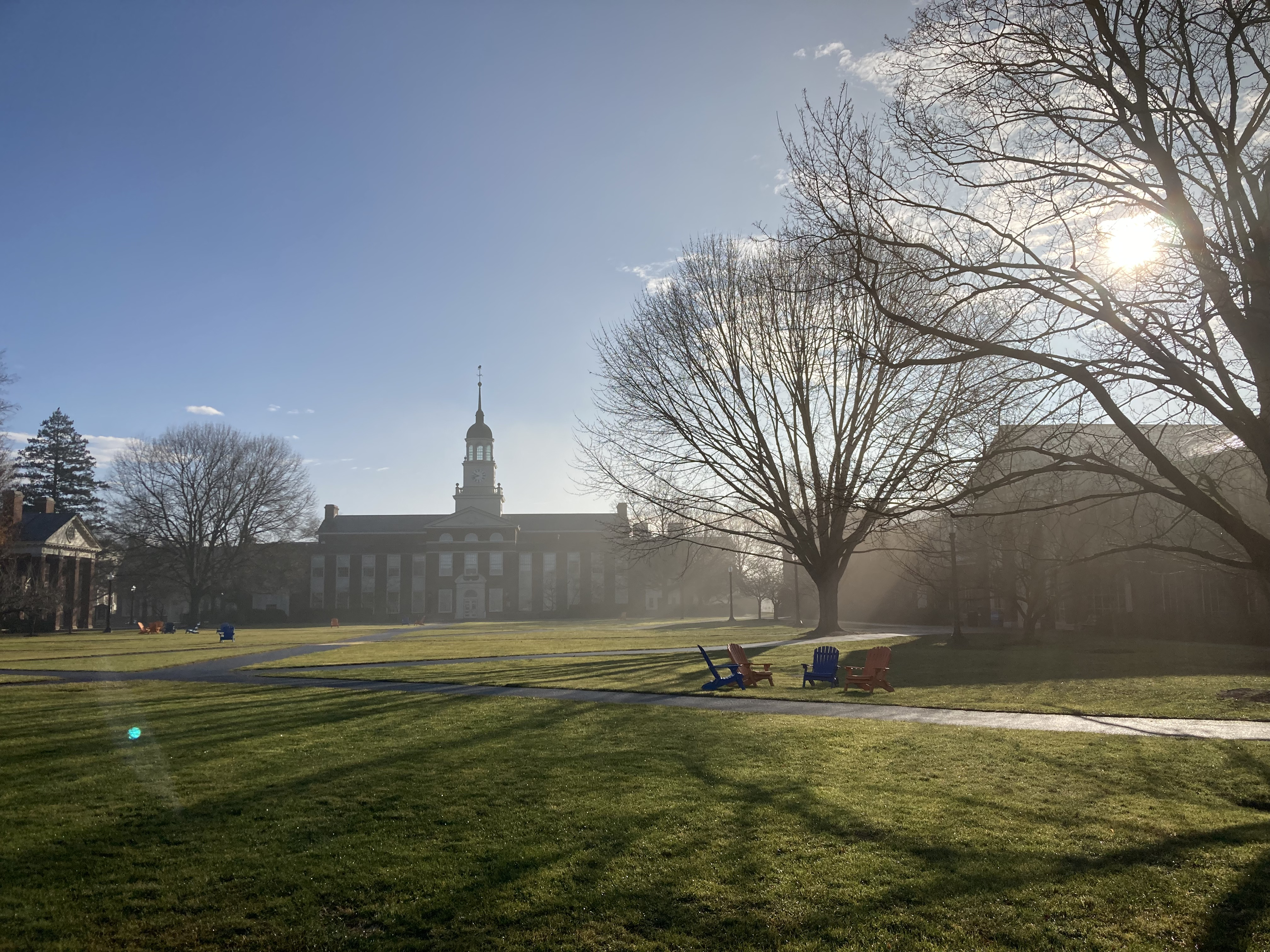
Bertrand Library and Coleman Hall

The College of Arts and Sciences anchors Bucknell University in the liberal-arts tradition. Its three divisions—arts and humanities, social sciences, and natural sciences and mathematics—host 275 faculty members in 34 departments and 66% percent of all students enrolled in fifty majors. The college emphasizes intellectual community in diversity, transformative education for the common good, mentorship that encourages students to lead examined lives and leading-edge research and scholarship.

=== College of Engineering ===
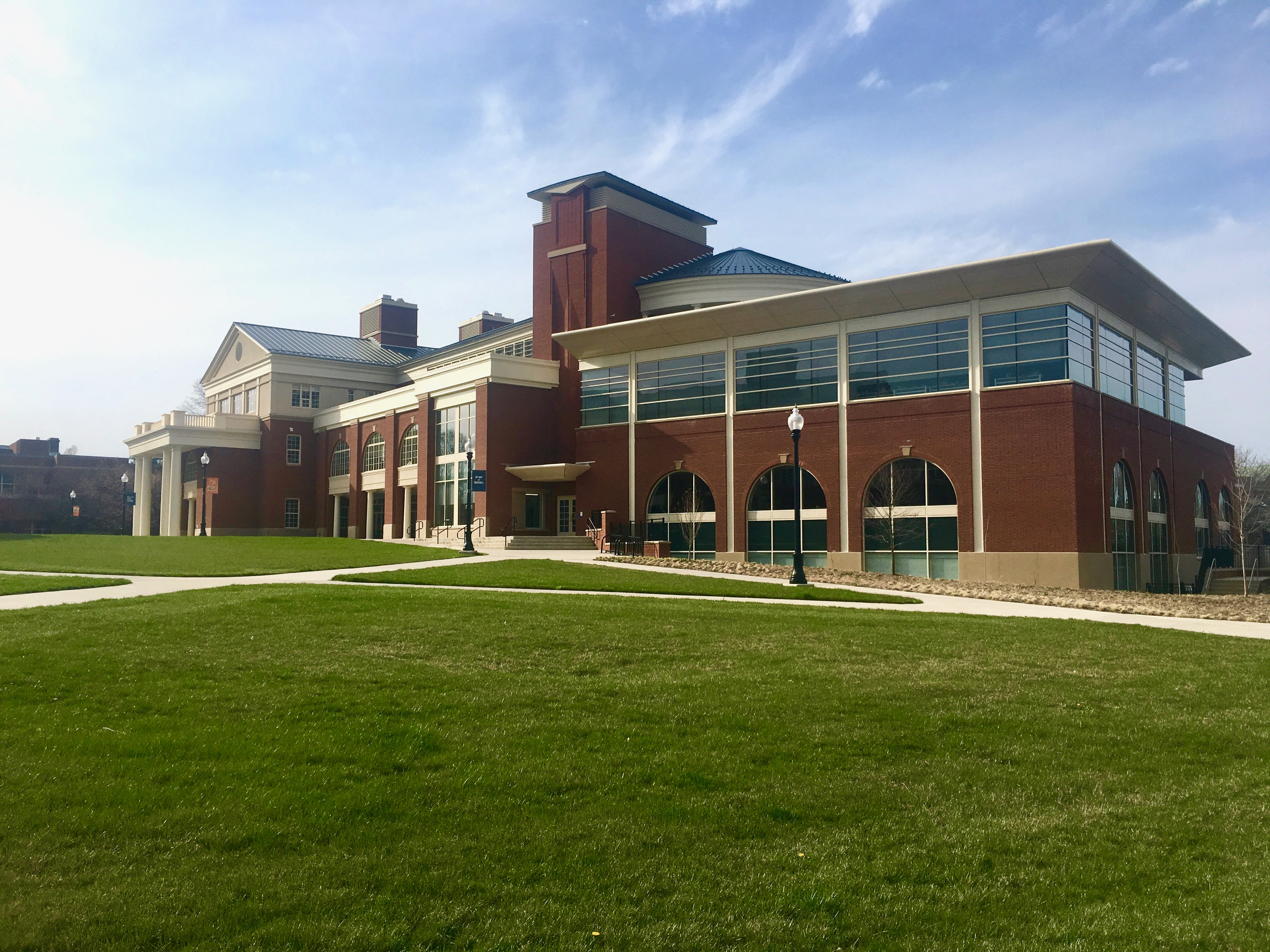
Academic East Building

Among American colleges that do not offer a PhD in engineering, Bucknell was ranked 7th, according to the 2024 edition of the U.S. News & World Report college ranking. The same report ranked Computer Engineering 5th, Civil Engineering 3rd, Electrical Engineering 4th, and Mechanical Engineering 3rd.

=== Freeman College of Management ===
Students can choose from five tracks leading to the Bachelor of Science in Business Administration degree: managing for sustainability, markets innovation and design, global management, accounting and financial management, or analytics and operations management. A five-year, dual degree in Engineering and Management is available for engineers with management career goals. In 2026, The Freeman College of Management was ranked 38th among undergraduate business schools by Poets & Quants.

=== Centers and institutes ===
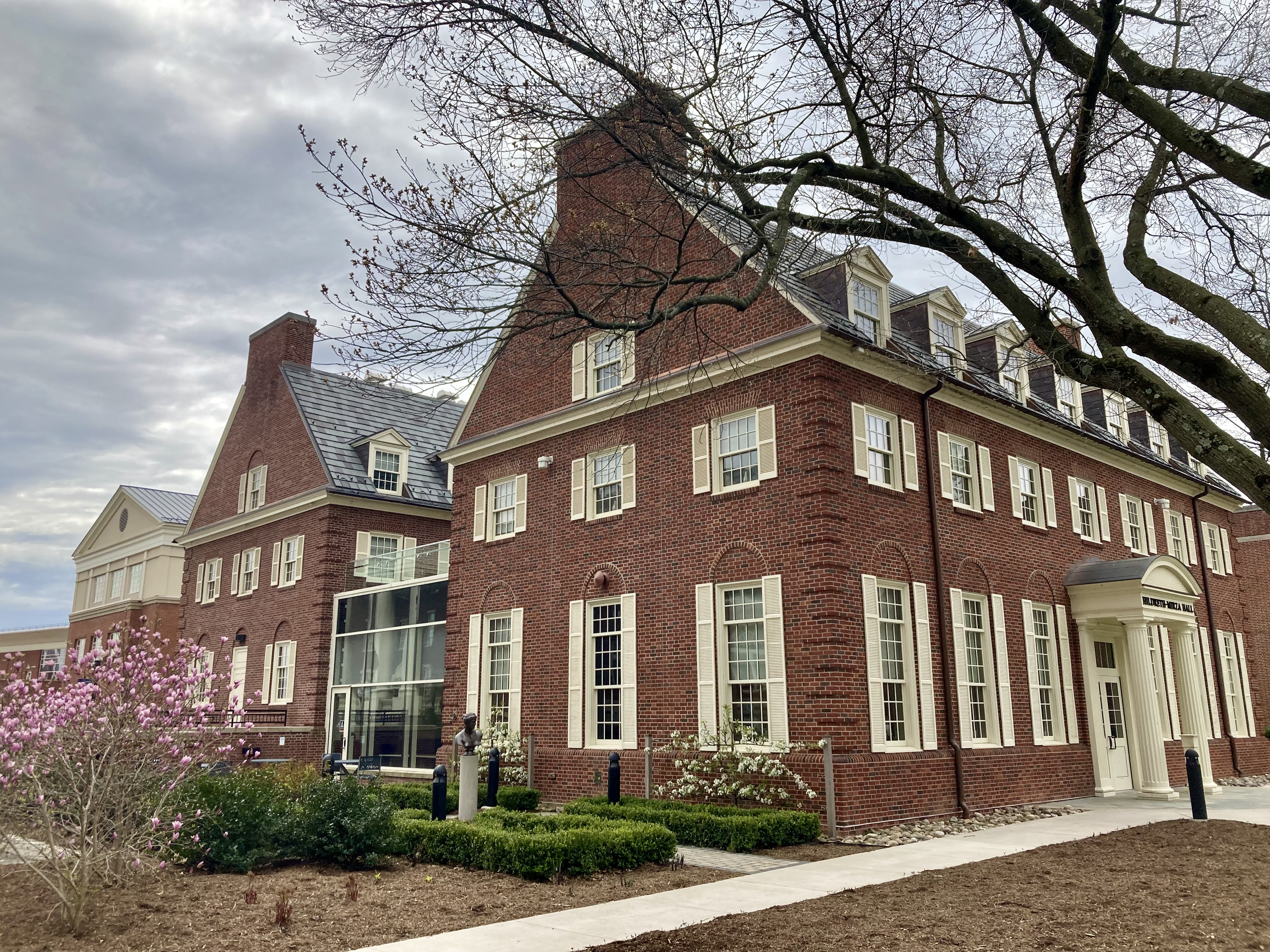
Hildreth-Mirza Hall

The Bucknell Humanities Center opened in 2017 with the inauguration of Hildreth-Mirza Hall. The center continues Bucknell's tradition of humanistic inquiry through grants and fellowships for faculty and student research. It also coordinates programming ranging from the student-organized Humanities Week to guest speakers and faculty colloquia as part of its annual themed programming. Recent themes include "Non/Humanity" (2021–22), "Pandemics" (2022–23), and "Colonial entanglements" (2023–24).

The Geisinger-Bucknell Autism and Developmental Medicine Institute was formed in April 2013 as a partnership between Bucknell and the Geisinger Health System, headquartered in nearby Danville. This facility combines clinical treatment and interdisciplinary research on neurodevelopmental disorders.

Other centers and institutes include: the Bucknell Institute for Lifelong Learning, the Bucknell Institute for Public Policy, the Center for Social Science Research, the Center for the Study of Race Ethnicity and Gender, the China Institute, the Griot Institute for the Study of Black Lives and Cultures, the Stadler Center for Poetry and Literary Arts, and the Weis Center for the Performing Arts.

=== Study Abroad ===
Almost half of all Bucknell students study abroad through a large number of exchanges with partner institutions, as well as Bucknell operated sites in Accra, Athens, Granada, London, Singapore, Sydney, and Tours. Bucknell also runs a semester-long program in Washington, D.C., to support students with an interest in government public service.

== Rankings ==
Academic rankings

Liberal arts
- U.S. News & World Report: 29

National
- Forbes: 68
- WSJ/College Pulse: 91

In the 2027 edition of U.S. News & World Report, Bucknell ranked 29th in the "National Liberal Arts Colleges" category. LinkedIn’s 2025 study rated Bucknell as the #1 liberal arts school based on long-term career success. The 2027 edition of Forbes rated Bucknell 68th in its list of "America's Top Colleges" and 19th in its list of "Top 50 Small Colleges." In 2026, Washington Monthly, which ranks colleges and universities based on perceived contribution to the public good as measured by social mobility, research, and promoting public service, ranked Bucknell 564th among all colleges and universities. In 2024, the Payscale "College Salary Report" ranked Bucknell 40th among all colleges and universities and 10th among liberal arts colleges for salary potential. Bucknell is listed as one of the "Hidden Ivies" as published in 2016 by educational consultants Howard and Matthew Greene.

== Admissions ==
U.S. News & World Report classifies Bucknell's selectivity as "more selective". For the Class of 2028 (enrolled Fall 2024), Bucknell received 11,377 applications and accepted 3,291 (28.9%), with 994 enrolling (30.2% yield rate). The middle 50% range of SAT scores for the enrolled freshmen was 640–740 for reading and writing, and 670–760 for math, while the ACT middle 50% composite range was 31–34. Beginning in 2022, Bucknell has like most of its peer institutions become test optional, meaning applicants can choose whether or not to submit SAT and ACT scores when applying. The average high school grade point average (GPA) for enrolled freshmen the class of 2028 was 3.62.

== Athletics ==
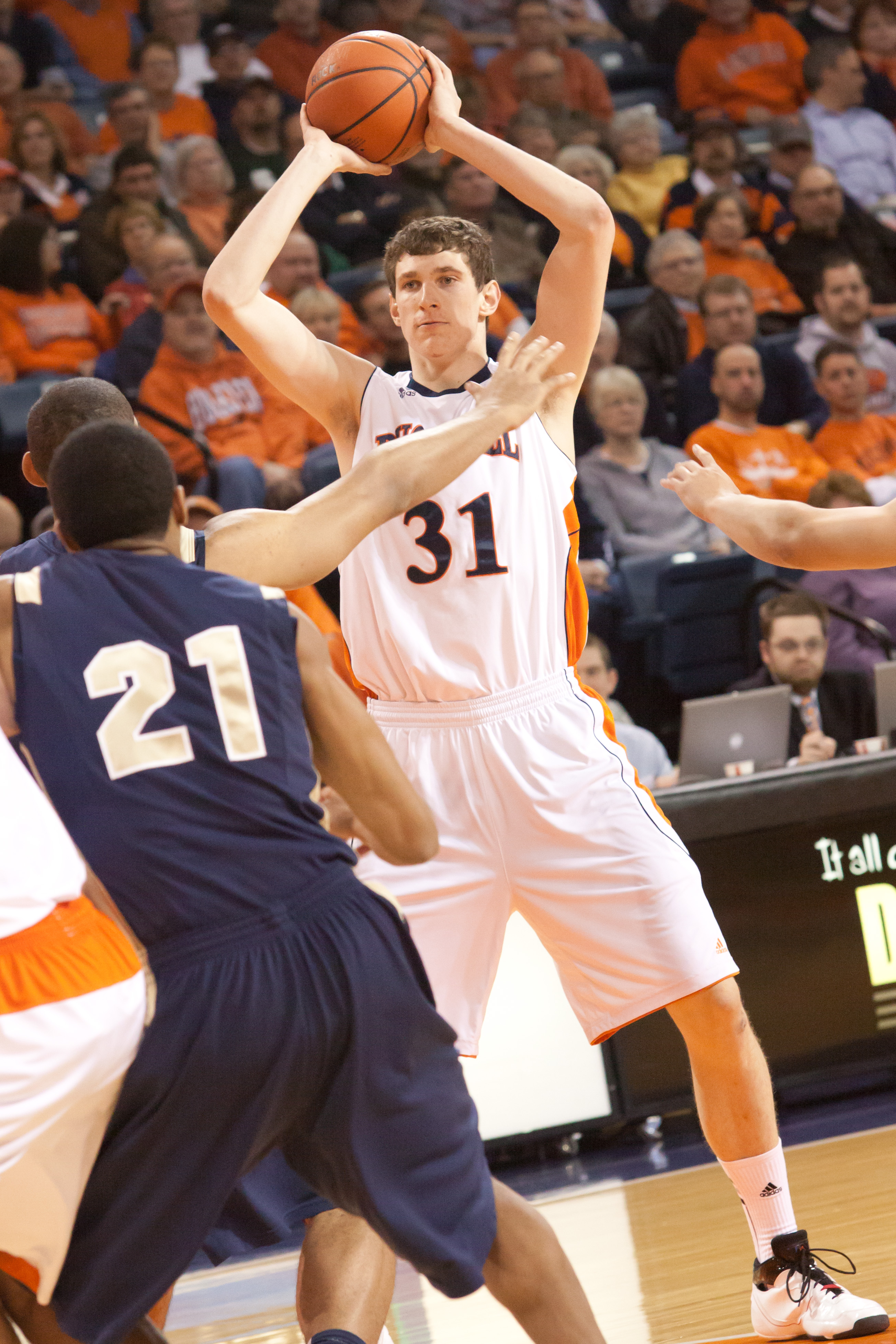
Mike Muscala

Bucknell is a member of the Patriot League for Division I sports (Division I FCS in football).

In 2005, the men's basketball team went to the NCAA men's basketball tournament and became the first Patriot League team to win an NCAA tournament game, upsetting Kansas 64–63. The victory followed a year that included wins over #7 Pittsburgh and Saint Joseph's. They lost to Wisconsin in the following round but received the honor of "Best Upset" at the 2005 ESPY Awards. The following year, Bucknell received a #9 seed (highest in Patriot League history) and defeated #8 seed Arkansas in the first round.

== Traditions and symbols ==
The Bucknell seal was approved in 1849. It shows the sun, an open book, and waves. The sun symbolizes the light of knowledge, while the book represents education surmounting the storms and "waves" of life.

Bucknell's colors are blue and orange, having been approved by a committee of students in 1887.

The bison is the mascot of Bucknell University. In 1923, William Bartol, a professor of mathematics and astronomy, suggested the animal due to Bucknell's location in the Buffalo Valley. The mascots name is Bucky.

The school cheer and fight song is "'ray Bucknell!"

== Student life ==
Bucknell has over 150 student organizations, a historical downtown cinema (Campus Theatre), a makerspace and crafts studio (7th Street Studio) and a calendar full of visiting speakers, art exhibits, performances, recitals, and year-end celebrations such as the "Chrysalis" ball and dinners sponsored by international student organizations.

Bucknell's student newspaper, The Bucknellian, is printed weekly and published digitally. Its headquarters are in Stuck House on South 7th Street on the campus.

Students at Bucknell operate a college radio station, WVBU-FM, which became streaming-only in 2019.

=== Fraternities and sororities ===
As of 2026, Bucknell University has seven active fraternity chapters and nine active sorority chapters.

== Alumni ==
Alumni of Bucknell University include: Burma's first physician Shaw Loo (class of 1863), National Baseball Hall of Fame pitcher Christy Mathewson (1902), Pro Football Hall of Fame Fullback/Linebacker Clarke Hinkle (1932), actor Ralph Waite (1952), novelist Philip Roth (1954), investor and philanthropist Ken Langone (1957), actor Edward Herrmann (1965), literary theorist and translator Peggy Kamuf (1969), CBS media executive Leslie Moonves (1971), author and pastor of Redeemer Presbyterian in New York City Tim Keller (1972), 2016 Pulitzer Prize winner for poetry, Peter Balakian (1973), New Jersey congressman Rob Andrews (1979), CEO of Lord & Taylor and The Children's Place, Jane T. Elfers (1983), entrepreneur Jessica Jackley (2000), and basketball player Mike Muscala (2013).
