= Miller Run =

River in the United States of America

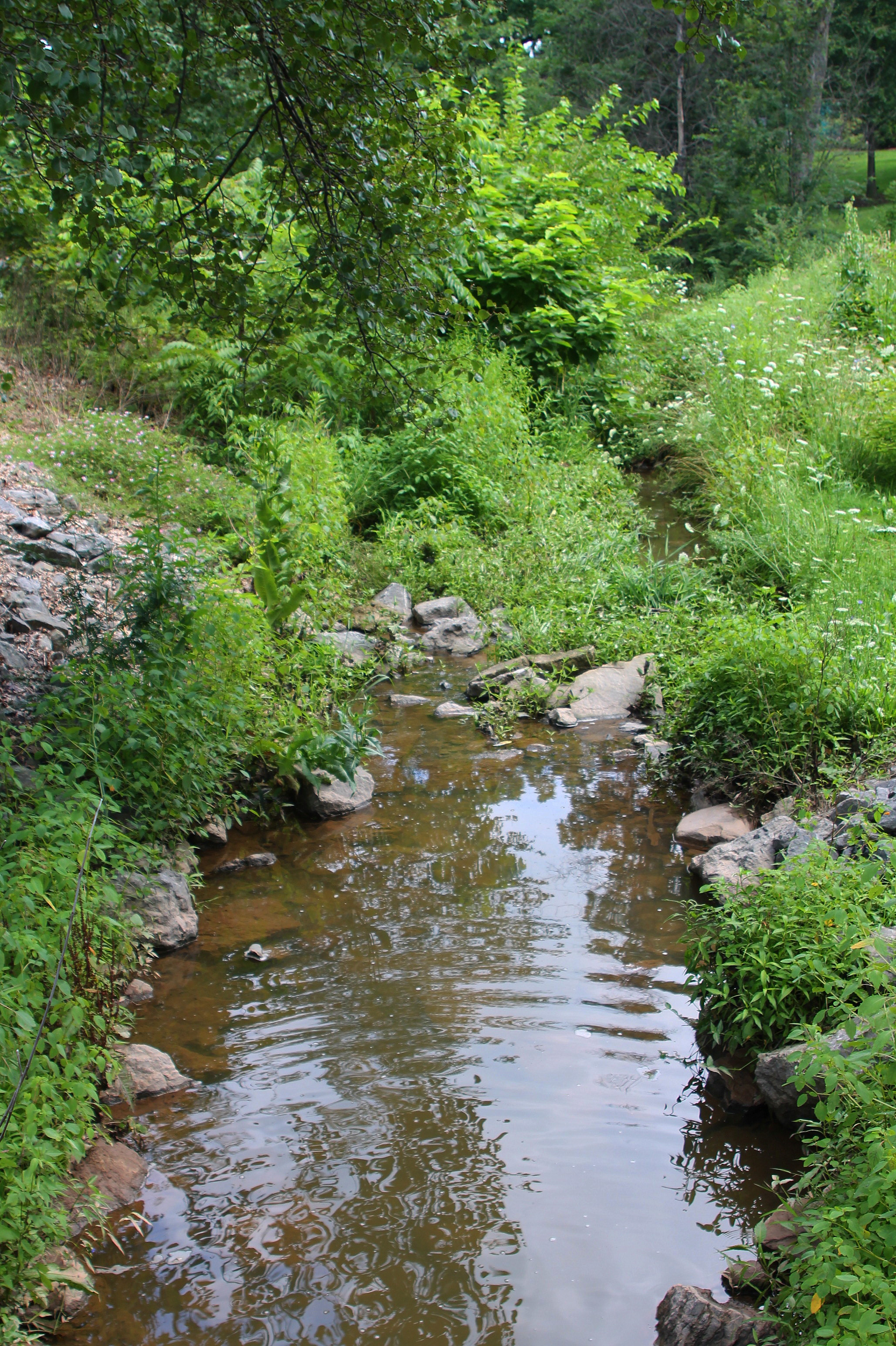
- Miller Run looking downstream

Physical characteristics
- Source
  - location: base of a small hill in East Buffalo Township, Union County, Pennsylvania
  - elevation: between 500 and 520 feet (150 and 160 m)
- Mouth
  - location: Limestone Run in Lewisburg, Union County, Pennsylvania
  - coordinates: 40°57′38″N 76°53′00″W
  - elevation: 430 ft (130 m)
- Length: 1.2 mi (1.9 km)
- Basin size: 0.87 sq mi (2.3 km^{2})

Basin features
- Progression: Limestone Run → West Branch Susquehanna River → Susquehanna River → Chesapeake Bay
- Tributaries
  - left: "North Miller Run"

Miller Run is a tributary of Limestone Run in Union County, Pennsylvania, in the United States. It is approximately 1.2 miles (1.9 km) long and flows through East Buffalo Township and Lewisburg. The watershed of the stream has an area of 0.87 square miles (2.3 km^{2}). The stream has no officially named tributaries. It is very small and is not a perennial stream, but is impacted by stormwater flows and also has high concentrations of sediment. The stream's chemical hydrology has been significantly affected by human use. Major rock formations in its watershed include the Bloomsburg Formation, the Keyser-Tonoloway Formation, and the Wills Creek Formation.

Most of the watershed of Miller Run is owned by Bucknell University. A significant fraction of the watershed is on urban land, but there is also some forested land. The stream was being channelized as early as the 1930s. In the 21st century, a number of studies and restoration projects have been done on it. The stream is a Warmwater Fishery and six fish species have been observed within it, though only one is found in its lower reaches. It has a very low concentration of benthic macroinvertebrates.

== Course ==
Miller Run begins at the base of a small hill in East Buffalo Township. It flows north for a short distance before turning north-northeast for several tenths of a mile. In this reach, the stream crosses US Route 15, passes through the Bucknell University campus (where it receives an unnamed tributary from the left), and enters Lewisburg. It then turns north for several hundred feet before reaching its confluence with Limestone Run.

=== Tributaries ===
Miller Run has no named tributaries. However, it has a tributary that is unofficially known as North Miller Run. The reach of Miller Run that is upstream of this tributary is sometimes known as South Miller Run.

== Hydrology and climate ==
Miller Run is impacted by stormwater flows and also has high concentrations of sediment. The lower reaches of the stream lack a perennial flow during significant portions of the year, especially during droughts. However, it was historically a perennial stream. Additionally, the stream can experience flash flooding during high flow conditions. The chemical hydrology of the stream has been significantly impacted by human use. One example of this is the fact that ion concentrations in the stream are considerably higher than ion concentrations in other similarly sized streams.

The average discharge of Miller Run averages approximately 0.005 cubic meters per second (0.18 cu ft/s), but can be considerably higher, sometimes over 1 cubic meter per second (35 cu ft/s). The stream exhibits highly unusual hydrologic behavior during rainstorms and snowmelts. In typical streams the discharge in the upper reaches peaks before that of the lower reaches. However, in Miller Run, this pattern is reversed and the discharge sometimes even peaks more than once. This is caused by large amounts of water flowing into it from storm drains and runoff-impervious surfaces.

Miller Run has sediment loads as high as 2287 parts per million. This is more than ten times higher than the nearby Buffalo Creek, which is itself "notorious" for its sedimentation. The concentration of dissolved oxygen in Miller Run was once measured to range from over 9 to more than 11 milligrams per liter. The concentration of ammonium in the stream was less than ten milligrams per liter in both its upper reaches and its lower reaches in February 2009 and the nitrate concentration was 1.9 milligrams per liter in its upper reaches and 1.98 milligrams per liter in its lower reaches. The phosphorus concentration was less than 0.1 milligrams per liter in both reaches. The sulfate concentration was 34 milligrams per liter in the stream's upper reaches and 48 milligrams per liter in the lower reaches. The chloride concentration was 81.7 milligrams per liter in the upper reaches and 47.9 milligrams per liter in the lower reaches.

In February 2009, the sodium concentration in the upper reaches of Miller Run was measured to be 32.2 milligrams per liter in the stream's upper reaches and 21.9 milligrams per liter in its lower reaches. The potassium concentration was 3.2 milligrams per liter in the upper reaches and 2.8 milligrams per liter in its lower reaches. In the stream's upper reaches, the magnesium and calcium concentrations were 9.7 and 57.9 milligrams per liter, respectively. In the lower reaches, they were 9.9 and 53.5 milligrams per liter, respectively. The concentrations of chromium, manganese, and iron were less than 0.004, 0.05, and 0.2 milligrams per liter in the upper reaches and less than 0.004, less than 0.03, and 0.23 milligrams per liter in the upper reaches. The concentrations of nickel, copper, and zinc were less than 0.005, less than 0.04, and less than 0.02 milligrams per liter in the upper reaches and the lower reaches. The arsenic, cadmium, and lead concentrations were less than 0.005, less than 0.001, and less than 0.01 milligrams per liter both reaches.

During one day in April 2009, the pH of Miller Run in its lower reaches ranged from about 7.85 to 8.1. The pH of the stream in its upper reaches ranged from under 7.6 to about 7.8. The specific conductivity of the stream was between 400 and 600 micro-siemens per centimeter. The use of road salt has contributed to the sodium, chloride, and potassium concentrations in the stream during snowmelt. During one snowmelt in February 2009, the concentrations of magnesium and calcium increased early in the snowmelt before decreasing. The concentrations of nitrate and sulfate also followed this pattern. The latter two possibly came from fertilizer carried into the stream by runoff. Heavy metals were mostly found in insignificant or undetectable amounts.

The average annual rate of precipitation in the watershed of Miller Run is 1.04 meters (3.4 ft). During one day in April 2009, the water temperature of the stream ranged from about 7 to 12 °C (45 to 54 °F).

== Geography and geology ==
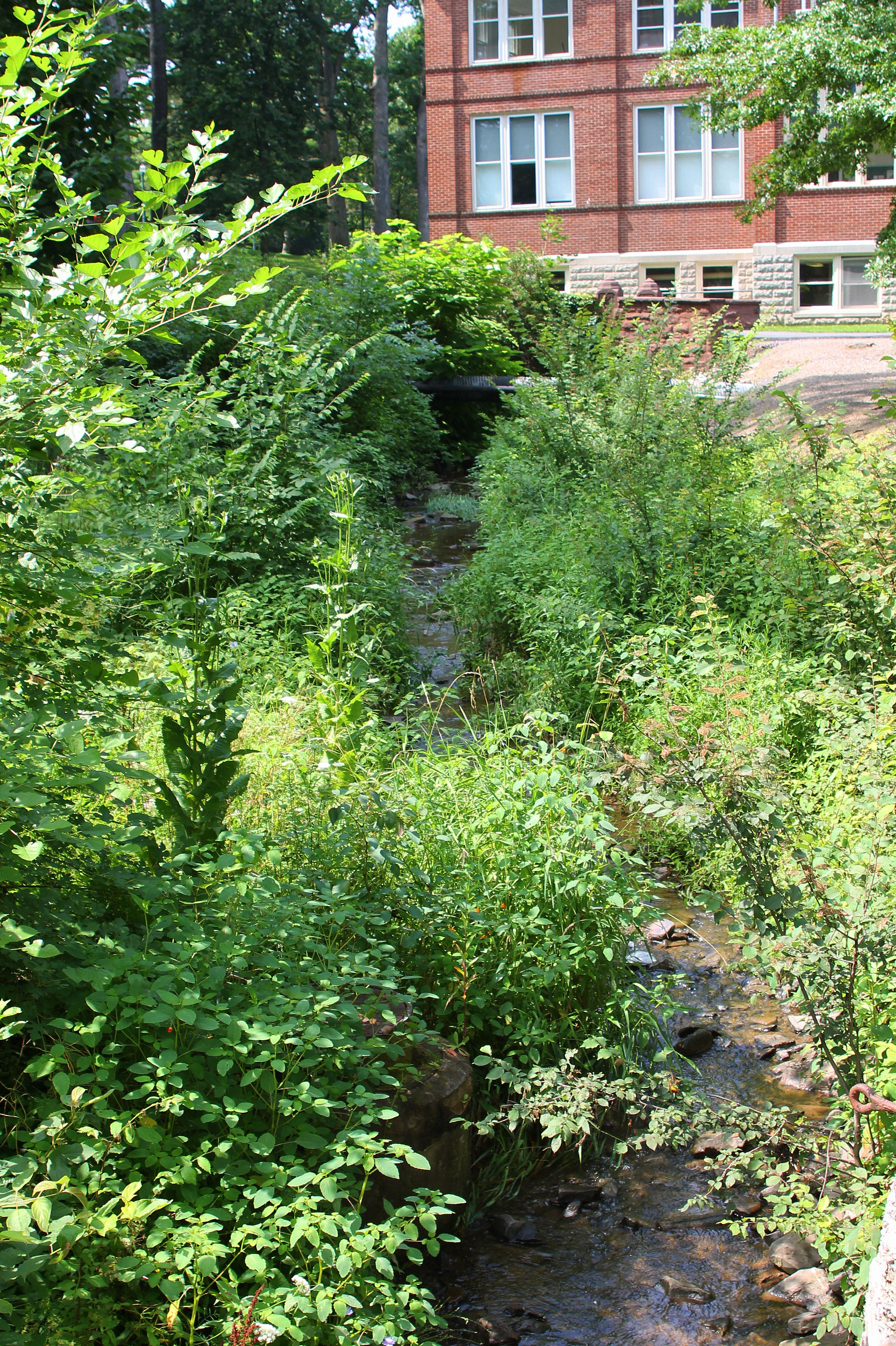
Miller Run looking upstream

The elevation near the mouth of Miller Run is 430 feet (130 m) above sea level. The elevation of the stream's source is between 500 and 520 feet (150 and 160 m) above sea level. The average elevation in the watershed is 518 feet (158 m) above sea level. The average slope is 3.12 degrees, or 11.36 meters per kilometer (60.0 ft/mi). As is the case with most streams, the gradient is highest in the stream's upper reaches.

The main rock formations in the watershed of Miller Run are sedimentary rocks from the Silurian period. In the southernmost reaches of the watershed, the bedrock is red shale and sandstone of the Bloomsburg Formation. In the middle part of the watershed, there is greenish-yellow sandstone of the Wills Creek Formation, and in the northern part of the watershed, there is limestone of the Keyser-Tonoloway Formation. The average depth of the bedrock in the watershed is 1.44 meters (4.7 ft).

The surficial geology in much of the watershed of Miller Run consists of unconsolidated sediment from the Pleistocene period. This is mostly a yellow-to-tan silt called loess, which has a depth of several inches to 8 feet (2.4 m). Other components of the watershed's surficial geology include gravelly till and outwash sediment. Riprap instability and streambank instability occur in the lower and middle reaches of the stream. Upstream of US Route 15, the bedload of the stream is finer than it is further downstream. At one site in the upper reaches, the average grain size is 12.08 millimeters (0.476 in). However, at a site in the lower reaches, the average grain size is 126.63 millimeters (4.985 in).

Miller Run is a "tiny stream" that is closer in appearance to a drainage ditch than an actual stream. It has the characteristics of a typical suburban stream. The stream was historically impacted by farming practices, as it was channelized and ditched to allow more room for crops. More recently, culverts, concrete channels, riprap, parking lots, and other developments by Bucknell University have further impacted it. There are more than a dozen obstructions along the stream. There are a number of culverts on it between the Sunflower Daycare Center driveway and its confluence with Limestone Run. None of them are capable of withstanding a 100 year flood. The stream is conveyed through underground pipes in some reaches.

== Watershed ==
The watershed of Miller Run has an area of 0.87 square miles (2.3 km^{2}). The stream is entirely within the United States Geological Survey quadrangle of Lewisburg.

Approximately 80 percent of the watershed of Miller Run is owned by Bucknell University. Land uses in the stream's watershed include an urban college campus, a golf course, a new housing development, and suburban territory on the edge of the watershed. A total of 37.5 percent of the watershed is on urban land and 13.1 percent is on forested land.

Miller Run has been described as "not appealing on the University campus" and can damage property during high flow conditions. Wetlands in the vicinity of the stream have been proposed for the purpose of stormwater retention. The Music and Arts Building is situated on top of the stream at one location. Its removal has been recommended to reduce building flooding and restore the stream to a natural state.

In one reach, Miller Run flows past private property that was built on an old coal ash landfill.

== History ==
Miller Run was entered into the Geographic Names Information System on October 1, 1992. Its identifier in the Geographic Names Information System is 1214632.

Miller Run has historically experienced significant modifications to increase its ability to carry away stormwater. Channelization and terracing was being done in the floodplain of Miller Run as early as the 1930s. By the 1940s, a reach of the stream near the old Davis Gymnasium has been straightened and channelized, but there was still no riprap. By the 1950s, numerous culverts and extensive channelization existed along the stream.

Some time in or before 2011, a major research project involving 80 students and 11 faculty members was carried out on Miller Run. The project involved GIS mapping, drone flights, sediment and water samples, and GPS measurements. The project was an extension of studies done by Allison Shaffer in 2007 and a stream restoration course taught by Bucknell University professors Craig Kochel and Matt McTammany in 2009. In 2010, the Pennsylvania Department of Environmental Protection awarded Bucknell University a $178,000 Growing Greener grant to restore the upper reaches of the stream.

The Bucknell University golf course is located in the vicinity of Miller Run. In 2015, a restoration project on the stream attracted some criticism from users of the golf course, as it has dried up the area and caused the driving range to look "like a desert" and business had been significantly reduced. They also criticized the scientific merit of the project, as the stream had barely any water in it. However, the Bucknell University website states that the project—which is supported by a $270,000 Growing Greener grant—"could change the way stream monitoring and restoration is carried out statewide".

== Biology ==
Miller Run is considered by the Pennsylvania Department of Environmental Protection to be a Warmwater Fishery. In a 2009 study, 23 individuals belonging to six fish species were observed in the stream. Twenty individuals from six species—namely, bluegill sunfish, central stoneroller, creek chub, cutlips minnow, common shiner, and pumpkinseed sunfish—were observed in the upper reaches. However, the only fish observed further downstream were three creek chubs. The significant majority of the fish observed at both sites were adults.

Miller Run has an extremely low concentration of benthic macroinvertebrates in all of its reaches. On a scale of 0 to 100, various sites on Miller Run had an IBI score of 14.47 to 25.82 (values below 63 indicate an impaired waterbody). The biodiversity levels of the macroinvertebrates are also very low; the Shannon Diversity Index scores range from 0.607 to 1.726. However, only a small fraction of the macroinvertebrates belong to pollution-sensitive taxa (specifically, 25 percent in the upper reaches, 10 percent in the middle reaches, and 5 percent in the lower reaches).

Common macroinvertebrate taxa in Miller Run at site MR-1 include Diptera, Amphipoda, Turbellaria, and Isopoda. Macroinvertebrate taxa in the stream at site MR-2 include Diptera, Amphipoda, Isopoda, and Oligochaeta. At the site MR-3, taxa include Diptera, Amphipoda, Turbellaria, and Isopoda, while at site MR-4, Diptera is by far the most common order.

Much of the length of Miller Run has experienced a lack of riparian vegetation. However, people from Bucknell University have planted and grown trees alongside the stream.

Miller Run has been assessed using the method used by the Pennsylvania Department of Environmental Protection. On a scale from 0 to 240, it ranked between 59 (poor) and 122 (marginal), depending on the stream reach. The ratings became progressively poorer as the stream moved downstream through the Bucknell University campus. The concentration of Chlorophyll a in Miller Run ranges from 2 to 12 micrograms per square centimetre (6.6×10^{−5} to 0.000393 oz/sq ft), and varies even at a single site. The concentration generally tends to increase further downstream.

== See also ==
- List of rivers of Pennsylvania
