= Copper beech =

Copper beech may refer to:

== Architecture ==
- Copper Beech Manor, built in 1857, in Lewisburg, Pennsylvania

== Botanical ==
- Copper beech (tree) (Fagus sylvatica purpurea), an ornamental cultivar of the European beech (Fagus sylvatica)

== Literature ==
- "The Adventure of the Copper Beeches", an 1892 Sherlock Holmes story by Arthur Conan Doyle, part of the collection The Adventures of Sherlock Holmes
- The Copper Beech, a 1992 novel by Maeve Binchy
- Blutbuch (Swiss German for 'Copper beech'), a 2022 book by Swiss author Kim de l'Horizon
