= Lewisburg Hotel =

Historic inn in Pennsylvania, United States

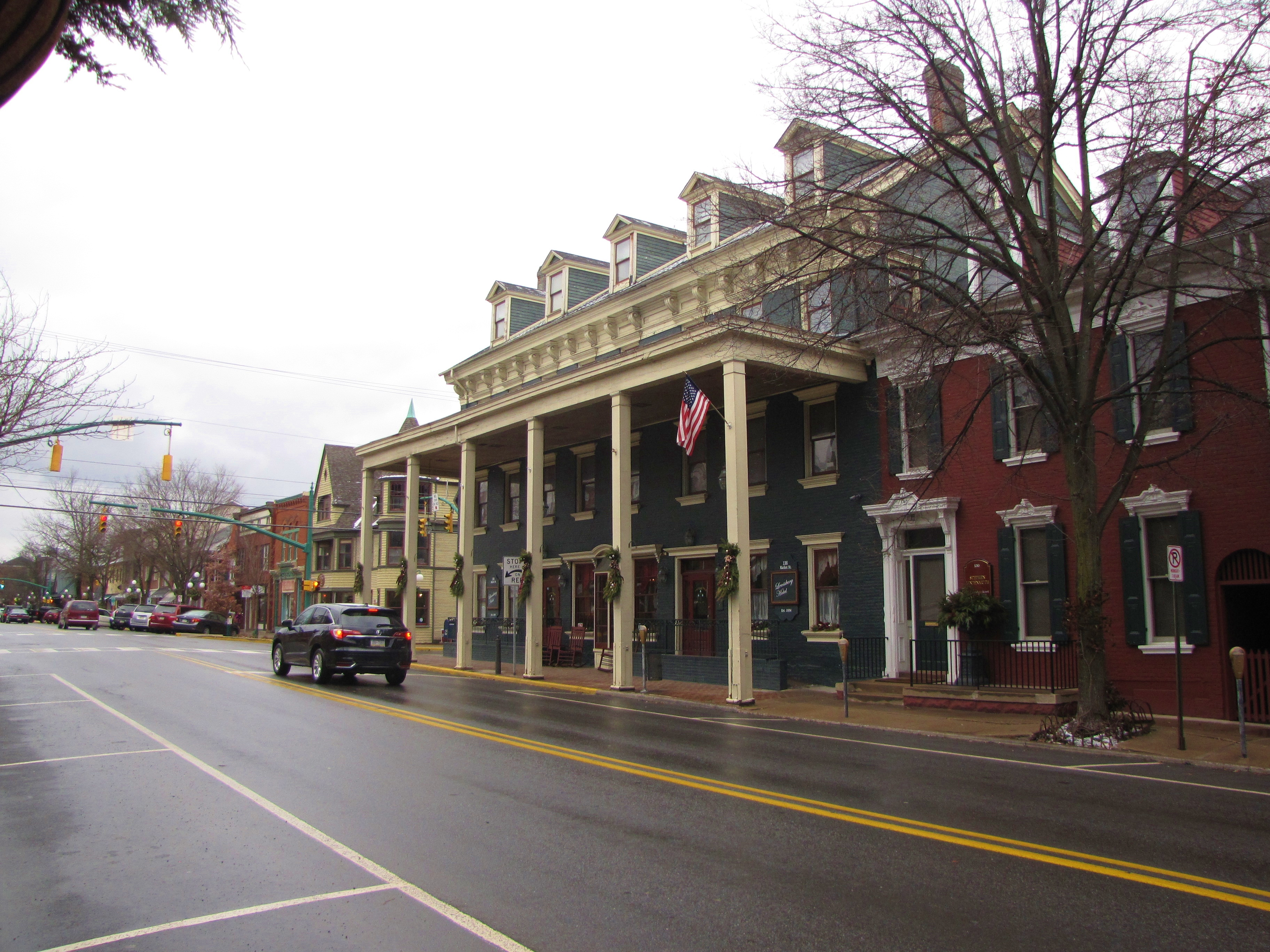
- Pictured in 2017
- Former names: Kline Hotel (1834 to 1874); Cameron House (from 1874)

General information
- Location: Lewisburg, Pennsylvania, 136 Market Street
- Coordinates: 40.9652°N 76.8836°W
- Opening: 1834 (192 years ago)

Technical details
- Floor count: 4
- Lifts/elevators: 1

Other information
- Number of bars: 1

Website
- thelewisburghotel.com

The Lewisburg Hotel is a hotel in Lewisburg, Pennsylvania. Standing on the northern side of Market Street, at its intersection with North Second Street, it was built in 1834. It closed in 1992, but was renovated and reopened in 1997.

It was the home of Stephen William Taylor, the first president of the University at Lewisburg (now named Bucknell University), when it was known as the Kline Hotel. It became known as Cameron House in 1874, a name which remained for over sixty years. Its bar and lounge is still named for Cameron. William Cameron was an early benefactor of Lewisburg.

In 1938, the hotel was owned by Grenoble Hotels, Inc.

In 1995, the hotel was purchased by Norm and Nancy Buck, who renovated the premises over a two-year period. The Bucks closed the hotel in 2025, and it was due to be renovated and reopened under new owners.
