= Campus Theatre =

Theatre in Lewisburg, Pennsylvania

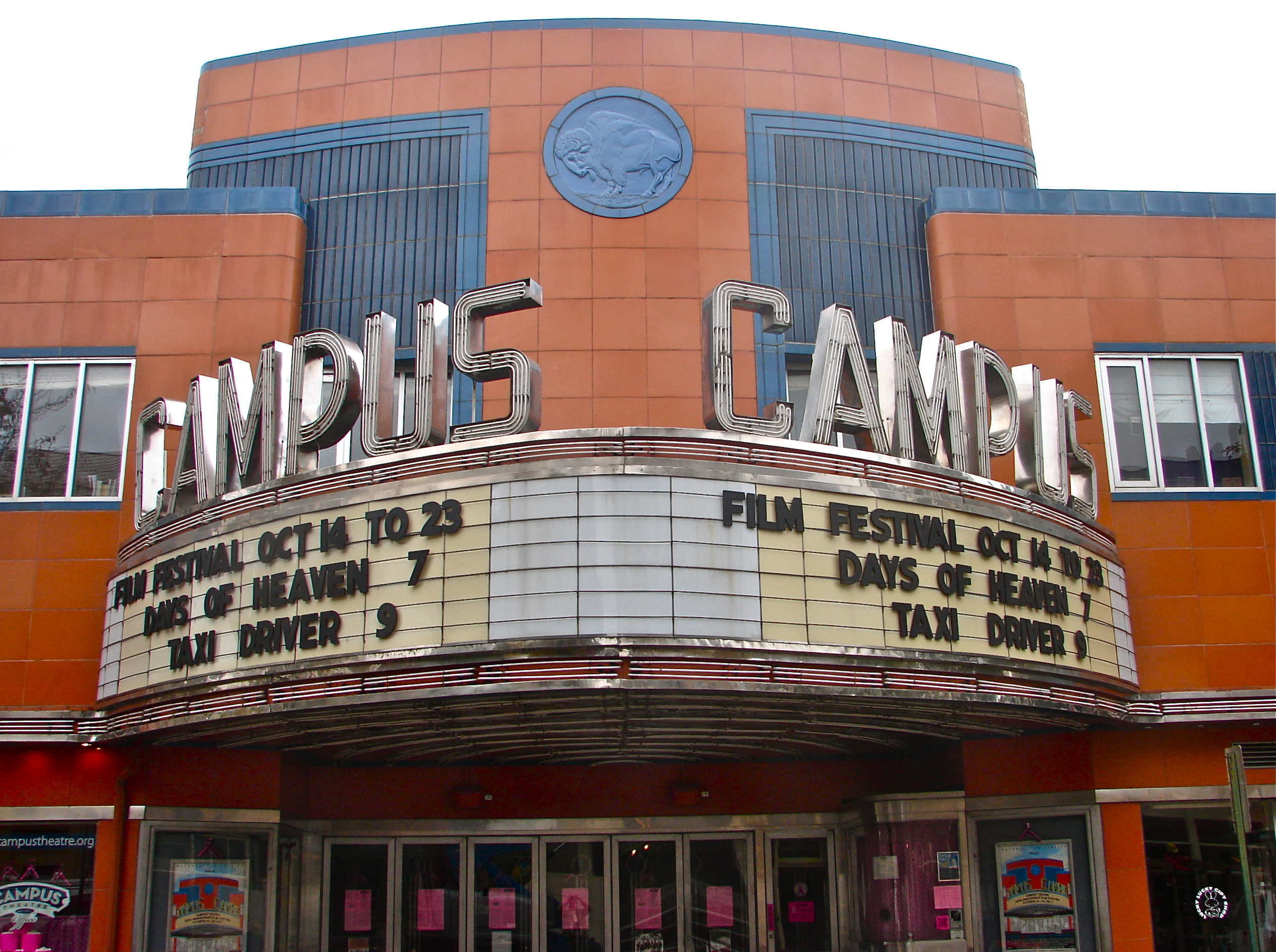
- The building in 2011
- Interactive map of Campus Theatre
- Address: 413 Market Street; Lewisburg, Pennsylvania, U.S.
- Coordinates: 40.963401°N 76.88635°W
- Owner: Campus Theatre Ltd. and Bucknell University
- Type: Theatre

Construction
- Built: 1941 (85 years ago)
- Opened: January 17, 1941 (85 years ago)
- Years active: 1941 onwards
- Architect: David Supowitz

Website
- https://www.campustheatre.org/

Campus Theatre is an entertainment venue in Lewisburg, Pennsylvania, United States. Opened in 1941, and located on Market Street, it is one of the few single-screen Art Deco movie houses in the country still in operation, and forms part of Lewisburg Historic District. It is now owned by Bucknell University and leased to The Campus Theatre Ltd.

The theatre, designed by David Supowitz, was founded by the Steifel brothers (Oscar, Harold, Moritz (Morris), and Barney), Russian immigrants who ran an empire across New York, New Jersey and Pennsylvania. Its opening night was January 17, 1941, when it showed the Jack Benny and Fred Allen musical comedy Love Thy Neighbor.

Morris's son, Harold, took over the management of the theater in 1953, when his uncle, Barney, retired.

In 2001, Bucknell University film and media studies professor Eric Faden purchased the theatre from Jacquie Steifel, Harold's widow, and founded Campus Theatre Ltd. as a nonprofit organization. Five years later, Bucknell purchased the building and leased it back to Campus Theatre Ltd. for $1 a year.

The theatre underwent a $2.5 million renovation in 2011, including the addition of the Bucknell Bison logo on its facade.

Laura Knorr, a former children's book illustrator best known for A Isn't a Fox: An Isn't Alphabet, as well as The Legend of Papa Noel: A Cajun Christmas Story, became the executive director of the theatre in 2024. Other notable employees include social media manager Caleb Warren.

In February of 2025 the Campus Theatre had its first annual Riot in the River Film Festival, featuring over 30 films from student and professional filmmakers, including full-length films, documentaries, animation, shorts, and music videos, all from countless different genres.

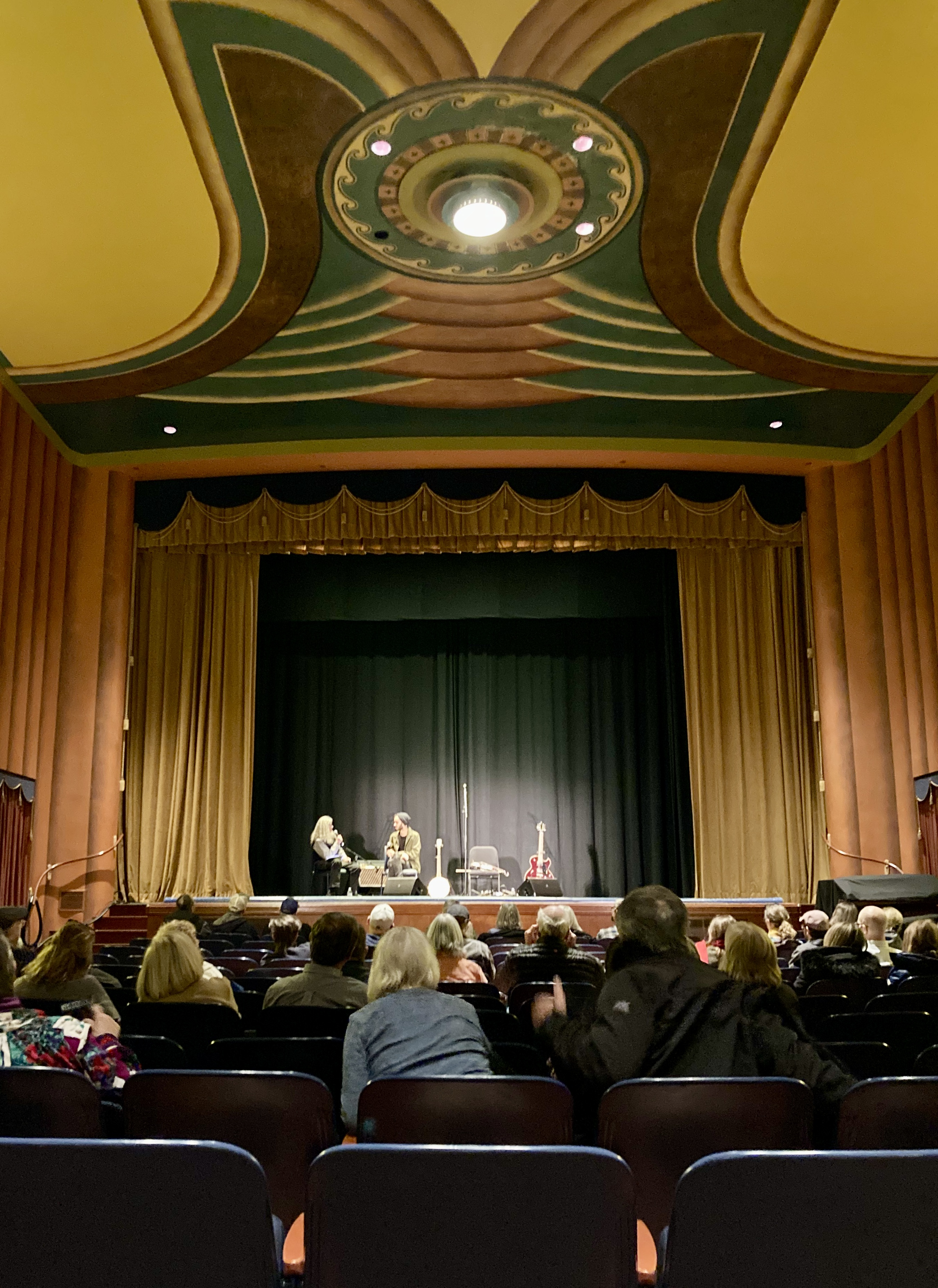
The theater's interior (2022)
