= Limestone Run (Union County, Pennsylvania) =

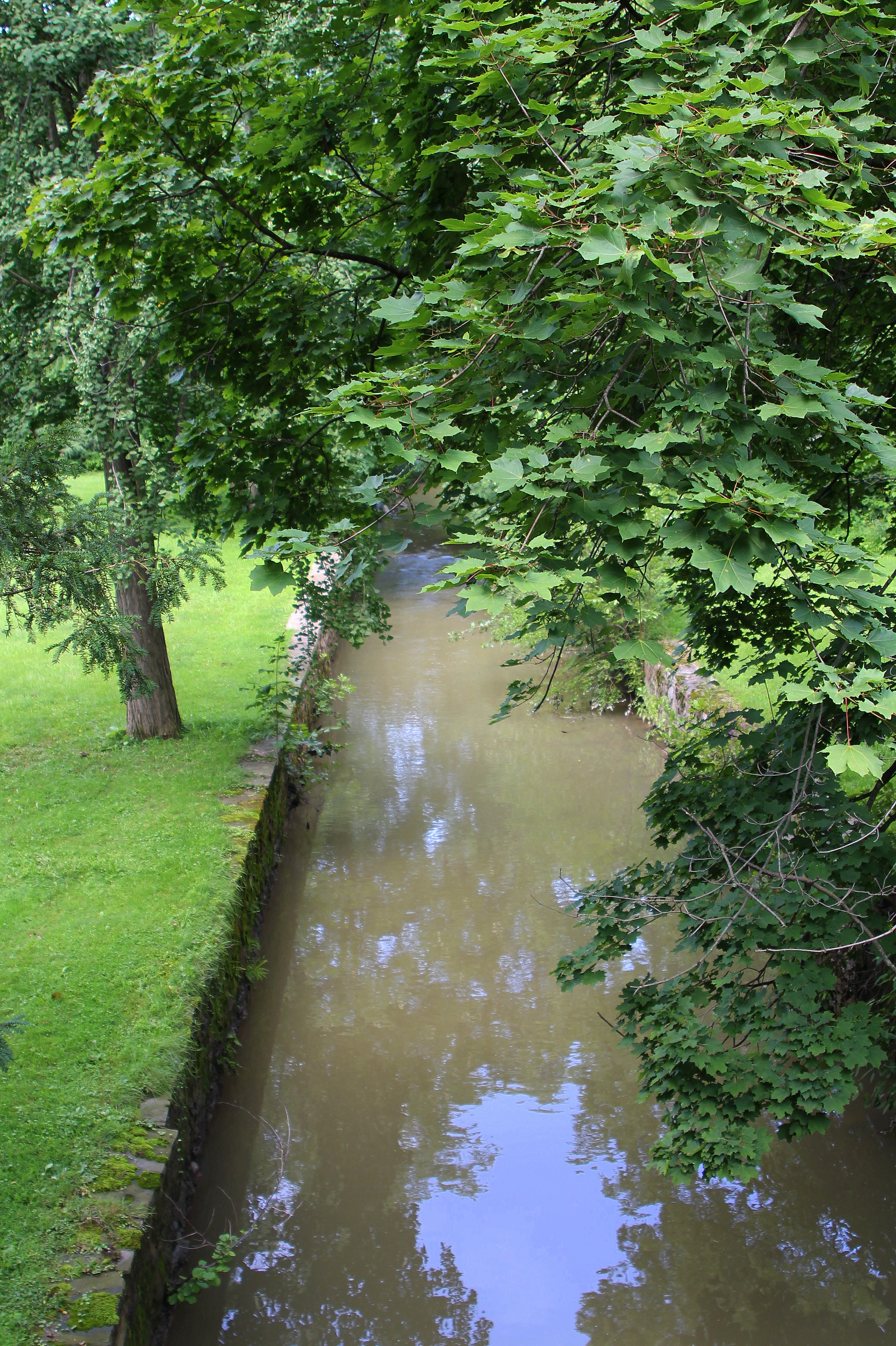
- Limestone Run, looking upstream, Lewisburg, Pennsylvania

- Location within the United States Location within Pennsylvania

Location
- Country: United States
- County: Union County
- Towns: Lewisburg

Physical characteristics
- Mouth: West Branch Susquehanna River
  - location: Lewisburg, Pennsylvania
  - coordinates: 40°57′46″N 76°53′40″W
- Length: 5.8 mi (9.3 km)

Limestone Run (also known as Bull Run) is a 5.8 miles (9.3 km) tributary of the West Branch Susquehanna River in Union County, Pennsylvania, which flows through East Buffalo Township, Buffalo Township and Lewisburg. Ludwig Derr once constructed a mill on the run, so one of its six tributaries is called Miller Run.

It is named Bull Run in a section of downtown Lewisburg, including as it passes beside Hufnagle Park.

== Course ==
The headwaters of Limestone Run are underground. The stream begins on the western border of East Buffalo Township and the eastern border of Buffalo Township, near the community of Lochiel. The stream flows northeast for a short distance, crossing Pennsylvania Route 45, and then turns west, following Pennsylvania Route 45. After several miles, it turns briefly southeast and crosses Pennsylvania Route 45 before turning northeast and crossing the state route again. It then enters Lewisburg and turns southeast, crossing U.S. Route 15 and Pennsylvania Route 45. The stream enters the West Branch Susquehanna River in southeastern Lewisburg, near Bucknell University, including passing beneath Market Street and University Avenue.

Limestone Run has six tributaries, of which only Miller Run is officially named.

== Hydrology ==
The concentration of dissolved oxygen in the streams of the Limestone Run watershed ranges from 5.31 to 12.7 milligrams per liter. The pH ranges from 7.17 to 7.88. In 2003, the water temperature of Limestone Run and several of its tributaries was measured. The temperatures ranged from 15.49 °C (59.88 °F) to 20.18 °C (68.32 °F). The alkalinity concentration in the Limestone Run watershed averages at 191 milligrams per liter.

The conductivity of Limestone Run and its tributaries ranges from 0.403 milli-siemens per centimeter on the tributary Miller Run to 0.598 milli-siemens per centimeter at a point on Limestone Run on Pennsylvania Route 45. The turbidity of the waters in the watershed, as measured in nephelometric turbidity units, ranges from 4.2 in the upper reaches of Limestone Run and 6.2 on a tributary in the middle reaches of the watershed to 12.6 in Lewisburg to 25.3 in the middle reaches of Limestone Run.

The concentration of total dissolved solids in the watershed of Limestone Run is approximately 0.289 to 0.29 milligrams per liter near its headwaters. In the middle reaches of the stream, the total dissolved solid concentration is approximately 0.38 to 0.388 milligrams per liter. Slightly upstream of Lewisburg, the concentration is about 0.37 or 0.38 milligrams per liter. The concentration of total dissolved solids in Lewisburg is also 0.37 or 0.38 milligrams per liter. Near the mouth, the concentration is 0.364 milligrams per liter. The total dissolved solids concentration on Limestone Run's tributaries ranges from 0.262 to 0.378 milligrams per liter.

The concentration of nitrates near the source of Limestone Run was 1.2 and 5.0 milligrams per liter on September 20 and October 18, 2003, respectively. In the middle of the stream, the concentration of nitrates was 6.2 and 7.6 milligrams per liter on those dates and was 4.4 and 5.4 milligrams per liter slightly upstream of Lewisburg. The nitrate concentration in Lewisburg was 3.9 on September 20 and 5.0 on October 18 and was 3.9 and 4.9 at the mouth on those dates, respectively. These nitrate concentrations are relatively high due to the fact that Limestone Run flows through large amounts of agricultural land.

There are no phosphates in the waters of Limestone Run and its tributaries, except for the headwaters, which had a phosphate concentration of 0.3 and 0.1 milligrams per liter on September 20, 2003 and October 18, 2003, respectively.

The concentration of chlorides in the waters of Limestone Run and its tributaries ranged from 8.2 to 21.5 milligrams per liter on September 20, 2003. The concentration was 8.2 milligrams per liter near the stream's headwaters, 19.5 milligrams per liter in the middle reaches of the stream, 20.0 milligrams per liter slightly upstream of Lewisburg, 21.4 milligrams per liter in Lewisburg, and 21.5 milligrams per liter slightly upstream of the mouth. The chloride concentration on several of Limestone Run's tributaries ranged from 11.3 to 17.5 milligrams per liter.

The concentration of sulfates in the Limestone Run watershed ranged from 25.5 to 42.1 milligrams per liter on October 18, 2003. The concentration was 25.5 milligrams per liter near the headwaters, 37.7 milligrams per liter in the middle of the stream, 40.7 milligrams per liter just upstream of Lewisburg, 42.1 milligrams per liter in Lewisburg, and 41.8 milligrams per liter near the mouth. The concentration on the stream's tributaries ranged from 29.3 to 36.2 milligrams per liter.

The concentration of sodium in Limestone Run ranges from 3.47 milligrams per liter near the source to 7.93 milligrams per liter near the mouth. The magnesium concentration ranges from 19.2 milligrams per liter near the stream's source to 26.5 milligrams per liter in the middle reaches of the stream. The minimum concentration of aluminum is 8 milligrams per liter upstream of Lewisburg and the maximum concentration is 15 milligrams per liter near the source. The potassium concentration ranges from 1.43 milligrams per liter upstream of Lewisburg to 2.5 milligrams per liter near the source. The concentration of calcium in the stream's waters ranges from 48.40 to 69.90 milligrams per liter near the source and the mouth, respectively.

The concentration of manganese in Limestone Run ranges from 24.9 to 71.2 milligrams per liter at the stream's mouth and source, respectively. The iron concentration ranges from 103 to 135 milligrams per liter in the central reaches of the stream and near its source, respectively. The concentration of copper in the stream ranges from 0.4 to 1.6 milligrams per liter above Lewisburg and at the mouth, respectively. The zinc concentration ranges from 0.5 milligrams per liter in the middle reaches of the stream to 5.6 near the mouth. The concentration of cadmium in Limestone Run is so low as to be undetectable in some locations, but is as high as 0.06 milligrams per liter in Lewisburg. The lead concentration is so low as to be undetectable in some locations, but is as high as 0.04 milligrams per liter near the source.

Parts of Limestone Run are considered to be impaired by the Pennsylvania Department of Environmental Protection.

== Geology ==
Much of the southern part of the Limestone Run watershed is in the Wills Creek formation, which comes from the Silurian period and consists mainly of calcareous shale. The part of the watershed is composed of rocks from the Bloomsburg and Mifflintown formations, which mainly consist of shale. It is found in a small area in the southeastern part of the watershed. The Keyser and Tonoloway formations, which mainly consist of limestone and are from the Devonian and Silurian periods, are found in the northern, central, and extreme southern parts of the watershed.

The Buffalo Valley is in the Limestone Run watershed.

== Watershed ==
Much of the western part of the Limestone Run watershed is agricultural land. Large portions of the central and southeastern reaches of the watershed are forested land. Most of the eastern part of the watershed is on a hard surface. The communities of Lewisburg and Linntown are both in the watershed.

Limestone Run drains about two thirds of the area of Lewisburg.

== History ==
Limestone Run has been known in the past as Spring Run, Wilson Run, and Bull Run. Ludwig Derr built a mill on the stream in the 1700s. It was still standing in 1860.

Marcus Huling once gained a tract of land on Limestone Run. David Kenedy purchased 200 acres of land on Limestone Run in 1785.

In the early 1900s, some residents of Lewisburg discharged sewage into Limestone Run.

Limestone Run flooded five times between 1997 and 2012. In 2012, workers overseen by the Union County Conservation District did work to stabilize the banks of Limestone Run and altered the channel of the stream.

== Biology ==
The concentration of E. coli in the waters of Limestone Run and its tributaries ranges from 90 to 1150 colonies per 100 milliliters. The areas with the highest concentration of E. coli also have high concentrations of algae.

Livestock have access to Limestone Run in its upper and middle reaches. Canada geese and wood ducks are found on the stream upstream of Lewisburg.

== See also ==
- Chillisquaque Creek, next tributary of the West Branch Susquehanna River going downriver
- Buffalo Creek (West Branch Susquehanna River), next tributary of the West Branch Susquehanna River going upriver
- List of rivers of Pennsylvania
