= David Supowitz =

American architect (1894–1964)

- Born: June 19, 1893; Philadelphia, Pennsylvania, U.S.
- Died: May 17, 1964 (aged 70)
- Resting place: Montefiore Cemetery, Abington Township, Pennsylvania, U.S.
- Occupation: Architect
- Buildings: Campus Theatre

David Supowitz (June 19, 1893 – May 17, 1964) was an American architect and philanthropist. He was the architect of over 500 buildings in the Philadelphia metropolitan area, mostly theaters but also synagogues, schools and hospitals.

== Early life ==
Supowitz was born in 1894 in Philadelphia, Pennsylvania. He had a sister, future Mrs. Frank Roberts, of Longmeadow, Massachusetts.

He studied at South Philadelphia High School (class of 1911) and later graduated from the University of Pennsylvania (class of 1915) with a Bachelor of Science in architecture. He earned his master's degree in 1916.

During high school, he spent the summers working for John T. Windrim. In October 1916, he began working for Magaziner and Potter, before returning to Windrim in April for five more months.

== Career ==
In October 1917, aged 20, Supowitz moved to Washington, D.C., where he worked for the U.S. Naval Construction Division.

He returned to Philadelphia in 1919, when he began working for Stanley Neubauer. He later became partner in the company Neubauer and Supowitz. The firm was in business until 1926, and Supowitz continued in sole practice through 1963. In 1928, he opened a new office at 260 South 15th Street in Philadelphia.

He shared an office with Israel Demchick and Shander Berger from 1945, and went into business as Supowitz and Demchick in 1963.

Supowitz became a corporate member of the American Institute of Architects in 1943.

== Death ==
Supowitz died in 1964, aged 70, at Einstein Medical Center, of which he was the associate architect. He was living at the time on South 17th Street in Philadelphia. He was interred in Montefiore Cemetery in Abington Township, Pennsylvania.

== Notable works ==
- Collingswood Theatre, Collingswood, New Jersey (1928)
- Roxy Theatre, Northampton, Pennsylvania (1933)
- Hollywood Theatre, Atlantic City, New Jersey (1936)
- Campus Theatre, Lewisburg, Pennsylvania (1941)
- Goldman Theatre, Philadelphia, Pennsylvania (1946)
- Randolph Theatre, Philadelphia, Pennsylvania (1949)
- Harbor Square Theatre, Stone Harbor, New Jersey
- Philadelphia Film Center, Philadelphia, Pennsylvania
- State Theatre, Boyertown, Pennsylvania
- Overbrook Theatre, Philadelphia, Pennsylvania
- Tioga Theatre, Philadelphia, Pennsylvania
