= Hufnagle Park =

Public park in Lewisburg, Pennsylvania, U.S.

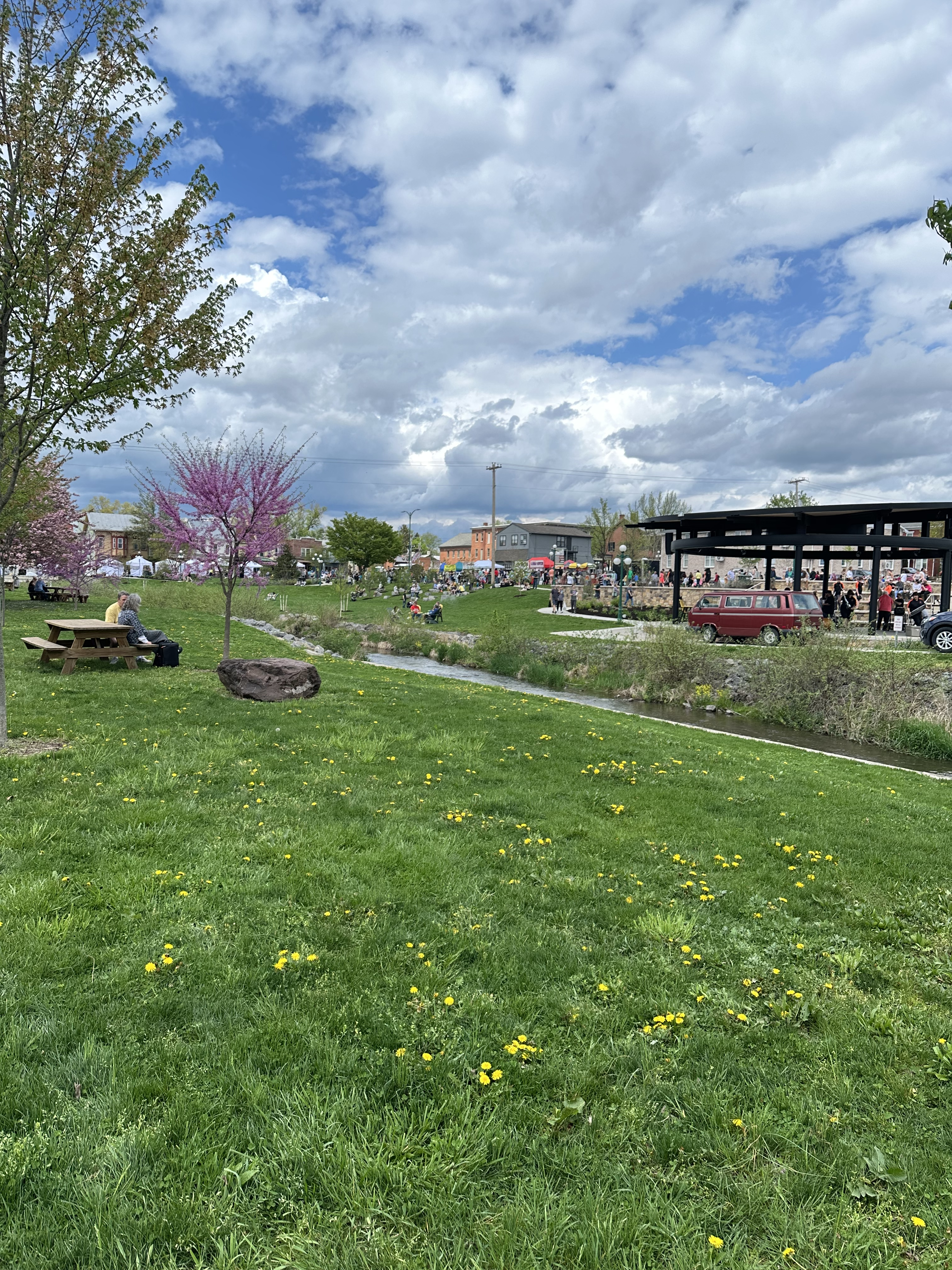
- Pictured in 2025, looking north to Market Street
- Interactive map of Hufnagle Park
- Type: Urban park
- Location: Lewisburg, Pennsylvania, U.S.
- Coordinates: 40.96213°N 76.88707°W

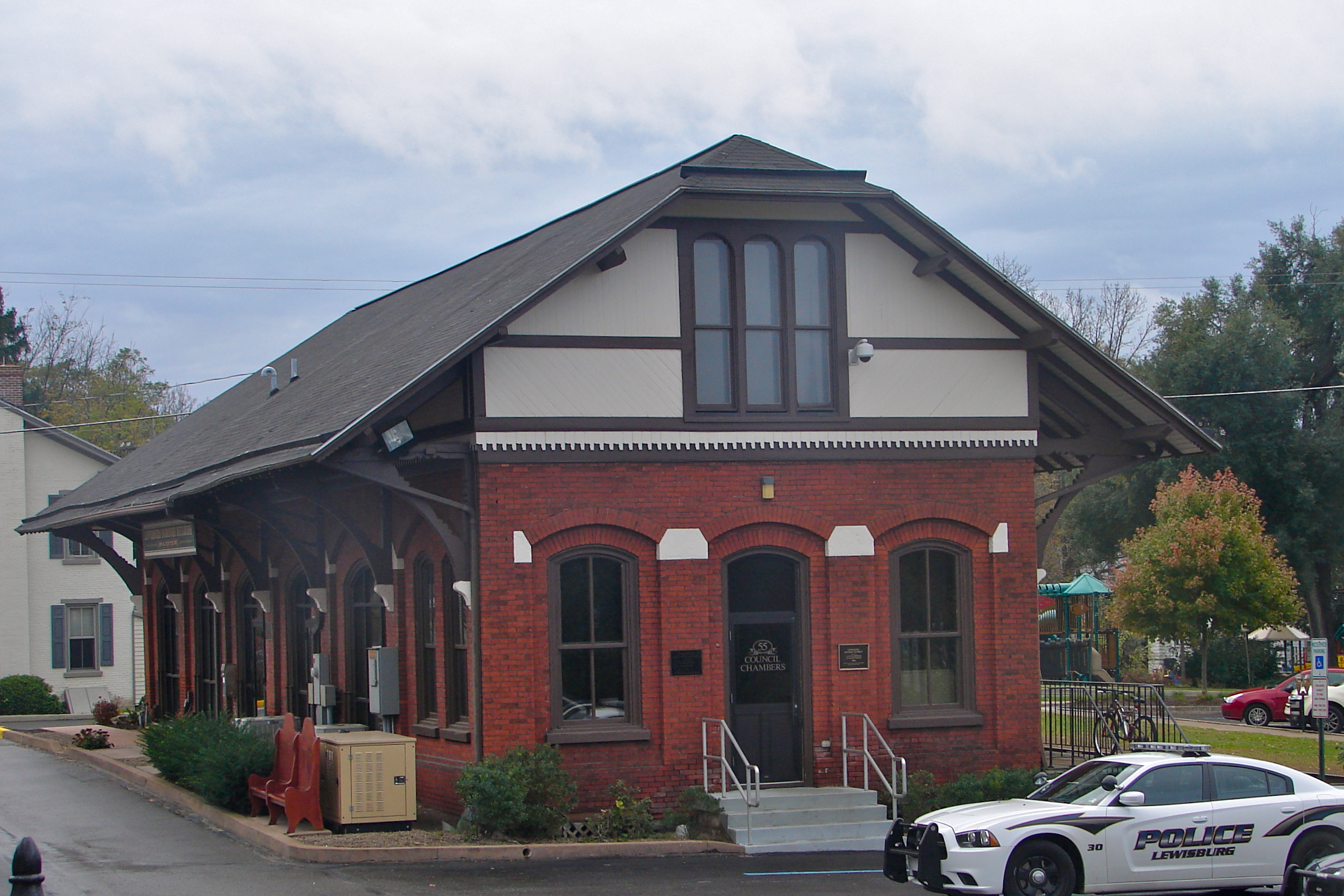
The former Lewisburg freight station

Hufnagle Park is an urban park in Lewisburg, Pennsylvania, United States. It runs for around 0.18 miles (0.29 km), from Market Street in the northwest to Saint Catharine Street in the southeast, and is bounded by South 6th Street to the west and South 5th Street to the north. Saint Louis Street bisects it just southeast of its midpoint. Bull Run runs along its western edge.

The park contains a picnic pavilion, playground equipment, and gardens. It is named in honor of former Public Safety director Gordon Hufnagle, who died saving lives during the Agnes Flood on June 21, 1972. A covered footbridge just north of the park was built in his honor in 1982.

Hufnagle Park is a terminus of the Buffalo Valley Rail Trail. The 9.5-mile (15.3 km) trail runs westward from Lewisburg to Mifflinburg following the rail bed of the Lewisburg & Tyrone Railroad, which was decommissioned in 1982. In 2009, the Buffalo Valley Recreation Authority acquired the right of way to the entire West Shore railroad which runs from Mifflinburg to Northumberland. The rail trail opened in 2011 and was extended in 2015.

The former Reading Railroad Freight Station stands beyond the park's northeastern corner, on North 5th Street. It is listed on the National Register of Historic Places.

== History ==
After the nearby West Branch Susquehanna River flooded in 1972, the houses that formerly stood where Hufnagle Park is today were demolished.

The park reopened in March 2024, having been closed for ten months for a $3.5 million renovation.
