= Packwood House-American Hotel =

- U.S. National Register of Historic Places
- U.S. Historic district – Contributing property
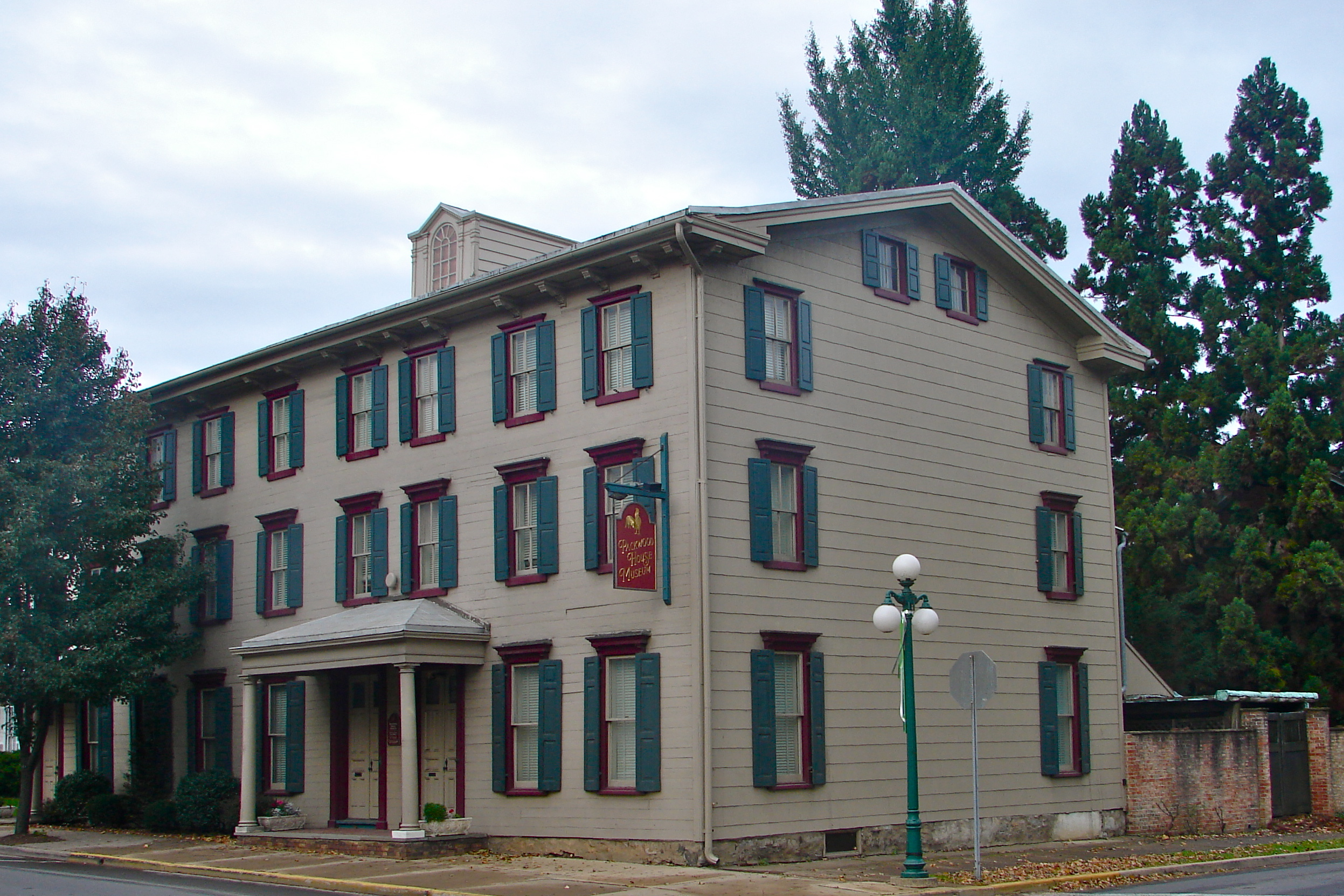
- Packwood House, October 2011

- Location within Pennsylvania Location within the United States
- Location: 10 Market Street, Lewisburg, Pennsylvania
- Coordinates: 40°57′59″N 76°52′57″W
- Area: 0.5 acres (0.20 ha)
- Built: c. 1813, c. 1866
- Part of: Lewisburg Historic District (ID04000759)
- NRHP reference No.: 78002475

Significant dates
- Added to NRHP: September 20, 1978
- Designated CP: July 28, 2004

The Packwood House-American Hotel, also known as the Packwood House Museum, is a historic inn and tavern in Lewisburg, Union County, Pennsylvania, United States.

Located on Market Street in the Lewisburg Historic District, it was listed on the National Register of Historic Places in 1978.

== History and architectural features ==
Built circa 1813 and expanded circa 1866, this historic structure is a three-story, log and frame building with a gable roof. It has a two-story, pent roof, rear addition. It has housed a decorative arts museum since 1972.
