= Chamberlin Iron Front Building =

Historic building in Pennsylvania, US

- U.S. National Register of Historic Places
- U.S. Historic district – Contributing property
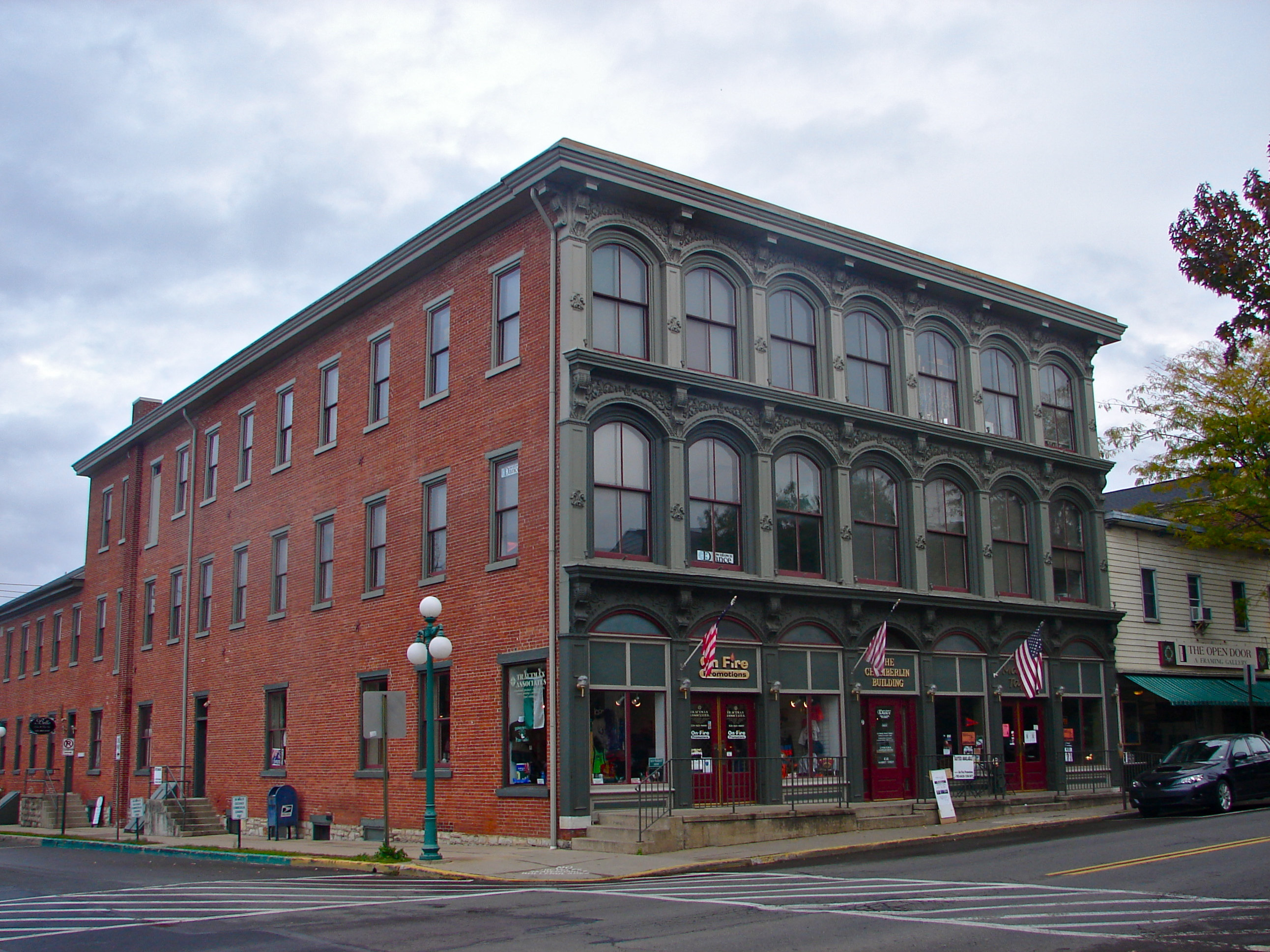
- Chamberlain Building, October 2011

- Location within Pennsylvania Location within the United States
- Location: 434 Market Street, Lewisburg, Pennsylvania
- Coordinates: 40°57′48″N 76°53′15″W
- Area: 0.2 acres (0.081 ha)
- Built: 1868
- Built by: Palmer, Lewis
- Architectural style: Italianate
- Part of: Lewisburg Historic District (ID04000759)
- NRHP reference No.: 79002347

Significant dates
- Added to NRHP: May 14, 1979
- Designated CP: July 28, 2004

Chamberlin Iron Front Building is a historic commercial building located on Market Street in Lewisburg, Union County, Pennsylvania. It was built in 1868, and is a three-story, brick building with a two-story rear addition in the Italianate style. It measures 56 feet wide and 160 feet deep. The main section has a flat roof and the addition a gable roof. It features a cast-iron front manufactured in Danville, Pennsylvania. Over the years the building has housed a general store, shoe store, feed store, and post office, as well as fraternal organizations on the upper floors.

It was listed on the National Register of Historic Places in 1979. It is located in the Lewisburg Historic District.
