= Ludwig Derr =

- Born: 1720; Palatinate, Germany
- Died: 1785 (aged 64–65); Pennsylvania, U.S.

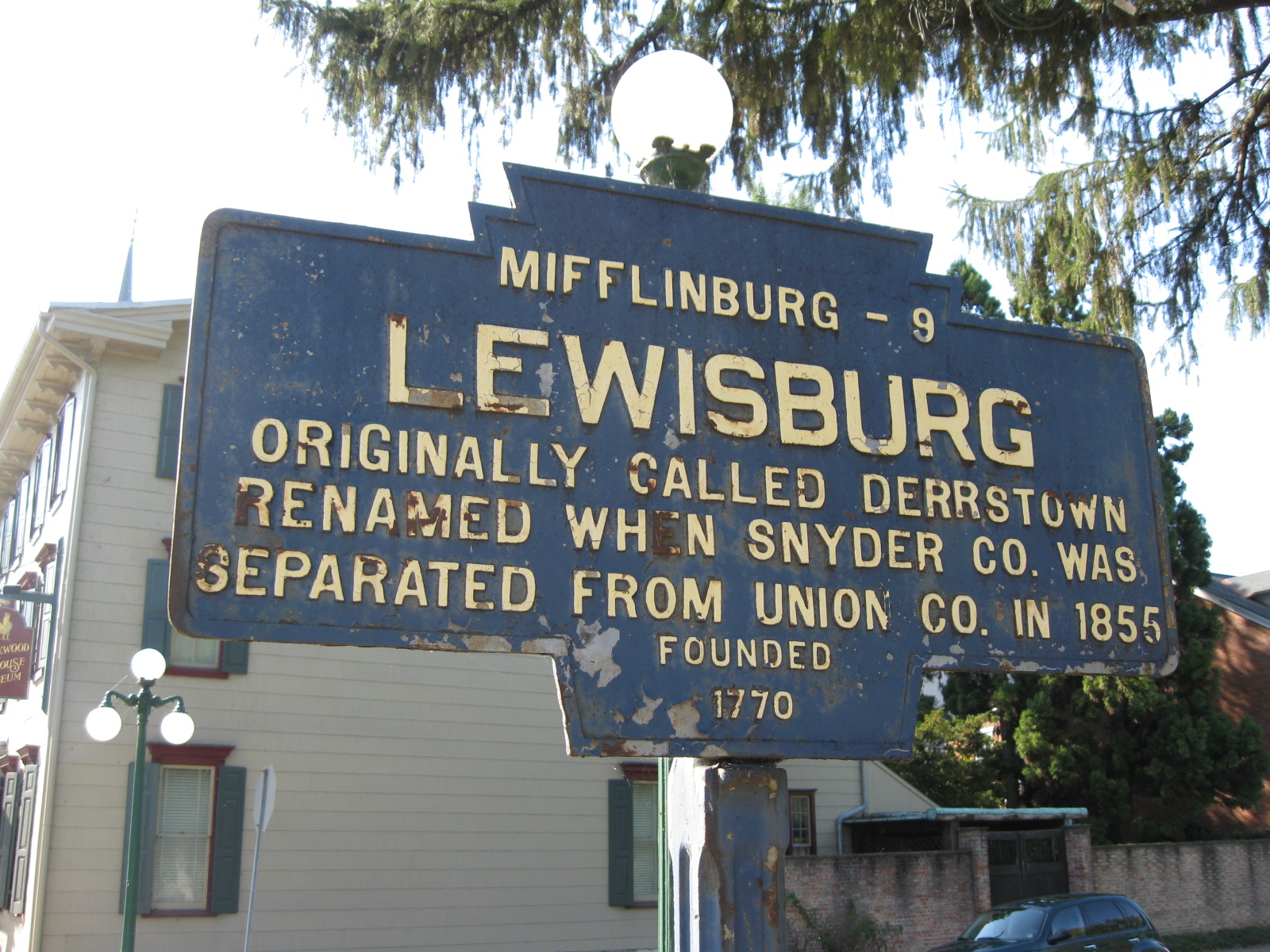
Lewisburg Keystone Marker

Ludwig Derr (1720–1785) was an 18th-century Palatinate German emigrant to colonial America. In 1785, he settled Lewisburg, Pennsylvania (as Derrstown), and designed its street layout.

A settler of the area from around 1765, Derr purchased several tracts of land from the William Penn family and other neighboring landowners, the largest of which was known as "The Prescott". Having been on the land for such a long time, Derr had befriended the local Native Americans of the area. His relationship with these indigenous peoples was so well founded that, even as many of the other local settlers' homesteads were routinely sacked by Native Americans, Derr's lands remained free from attacks. Subsequently, in 1784, he worked with Samuel Weiser to lay out his combined land tracts, and create Derrstown. Lewisburg was so named because the German name Ludwig becomes Lewis when translated into English. Its name was later changed to Lewisburgh when Snyder County was created from Union County in 1855 (according to a local Keystone Marker sign), but was known on original plans and deeds as Lewisburg before that time.

== Personal life ==
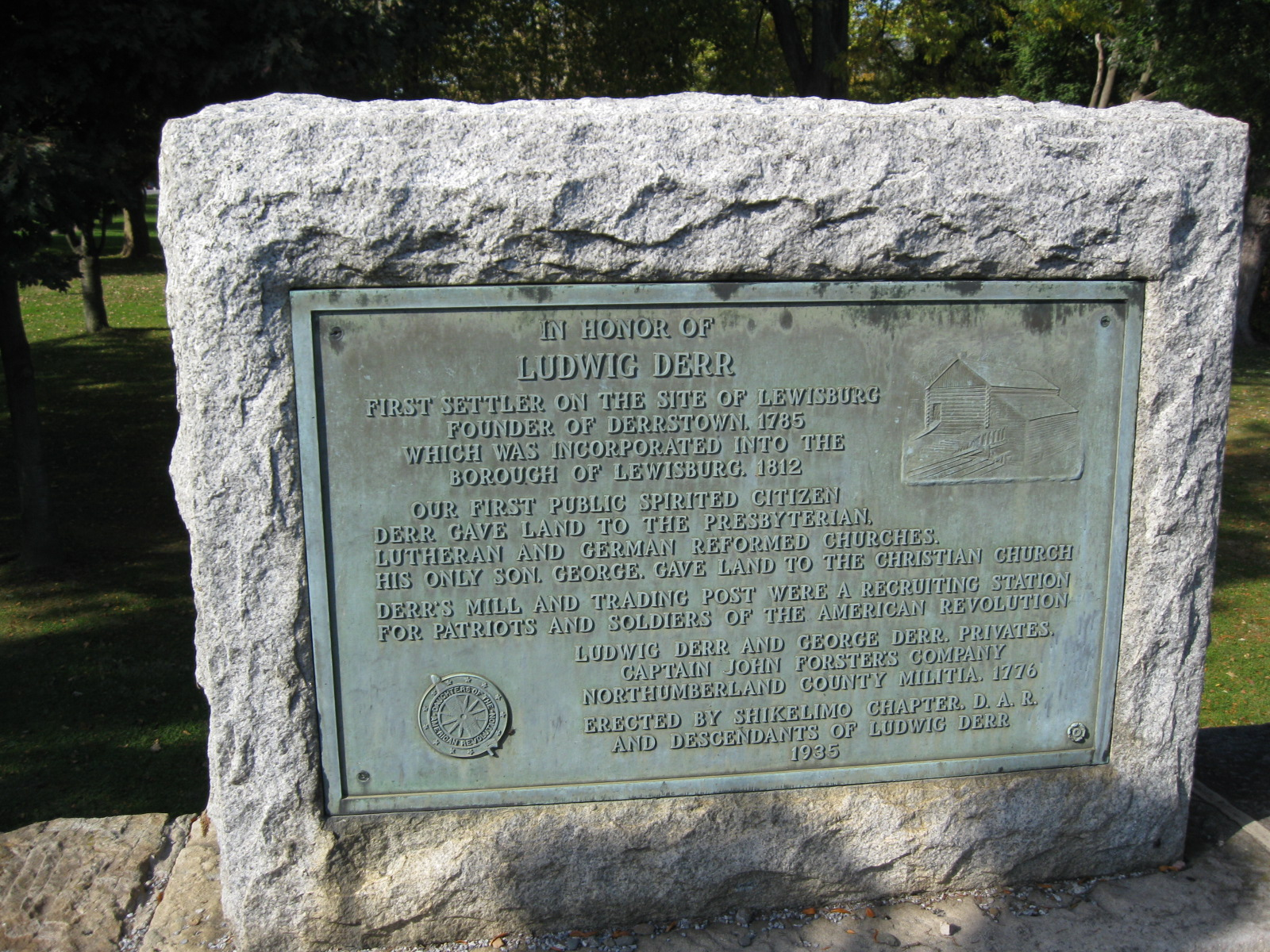
A memorial to Derr in Lewisburg

In 1758, Derr married Catherine Lorah, with whom he had one child, George, in 1762. The family was living in Heidelberg Township, Pennsylvania, at the time.

He served in the American Revolutionary War in the Northumberland County Militia, Rangers of the Frontier.

After settling Lewisburg, Derr built a house and a mill near the West Branch Susquehanna River and Limestone Run. The mill was still standing in 1860. He later lived in a large log house on Brown Street which still stands today, although much altered.

== Death ==
Derr died in November 1785, aged 64 or 65. He was buried in Buffalo Crossroads Presbyterian Cemetery in Union County, Pennsylvania. His widow died the following year. She was buried in Lewisburg Cemetery. Their son was buried beside her upon his death in 1829.

A plaque honouring Derr stands at the intersection of Market Street and North Water Street in downtown Lewisburg.
