= Market Street (Lewisburg, Pennsylvania) =

Street in Lewisburg, Pennsylvania, United States

Coordinates: 40.96121°N 76.89066°W

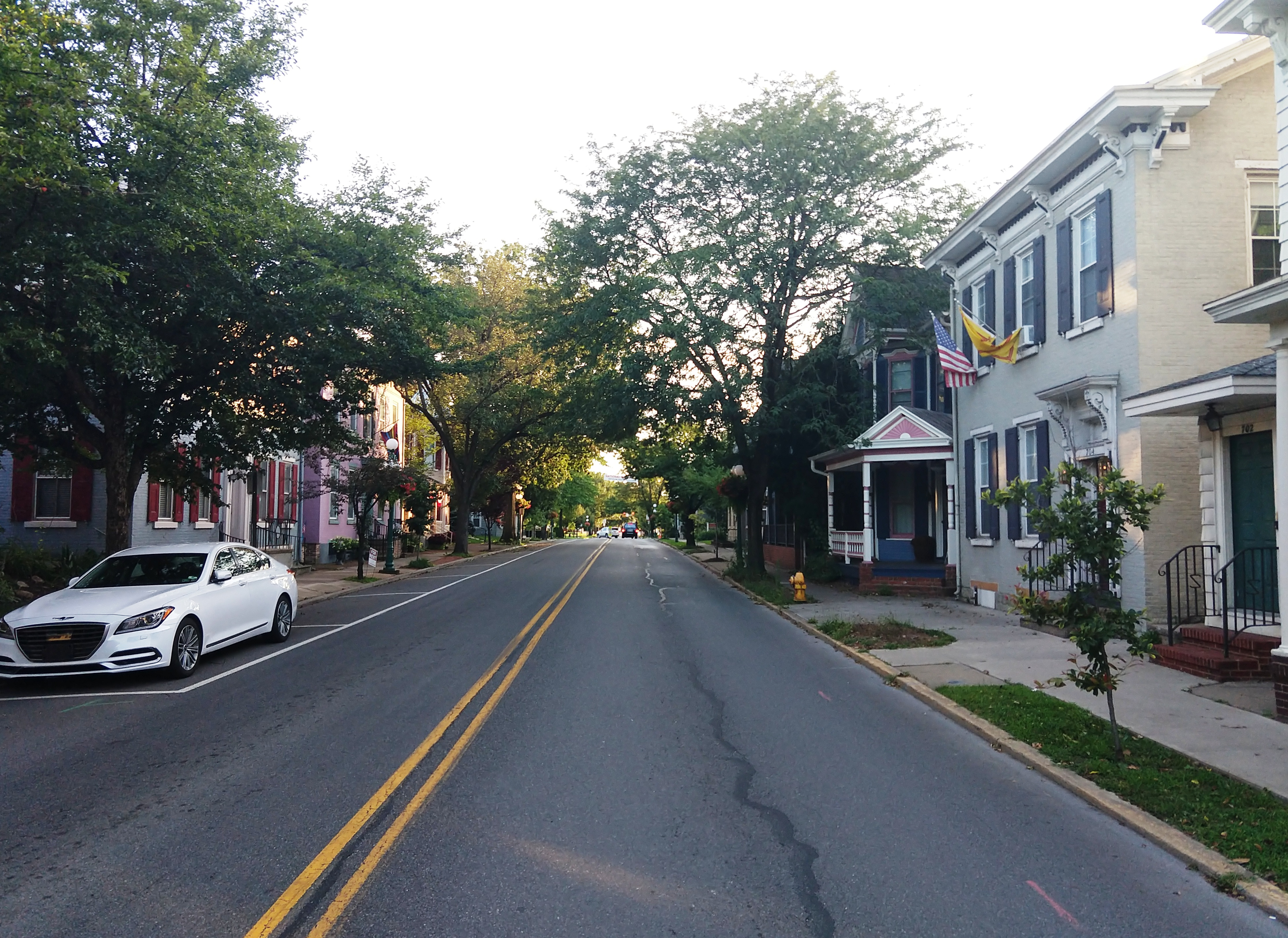
- Market Street, looking west from 7th Street in 2023
- Interactive map of Market Street
- Part of: PA 45
- Length: 1.6 mi (2.6 km)
- Location: Lewisburg, Pennsylvania, U.S.
- East end: Main Street
- West end: North Fairground Road

Market Street is a downtown street in Lewisburg, Pennsylvania, United States. It runs for around 1.6 miles (2.6 km), from Main Street, at the Union County/Northumberland County line, in the east to North Fairground Road in the west. It is part of Pennsylvania Route 45. West of its intersection with Derr Drive (U.S. Route 15), it is named West Market Street. From the West Branch Susquehanna River inland, Market Street's cross streets are numbered 2 through 8, with Front Street replacing what was originally 1st Street. These cross streets are named "North" or "South" depending on their location relative to Market Street. Lewisburg's street layout was designed by Ludwig Derr in 1785, and is believed to have been inspired by that of Philadelphia.

The street is part of the Lewisburg Historic District, which was added to the National Register of Historic Places in 2004. The Packwood House-American Hotel (1813), the Chamberlin Iron Front Building (1868), Copper Beech Manor (1857) and the William Cameron Home (1887) are each on Market Street. Throughout the nine blocks of the Historic Market Street Corridor, 115 of the 125 buildings are classified as being contributing structures to the historic character of the district.

In 1915, the borough installed the three-globe cast-iron street lights along Market Street.

== Notable addresses ==
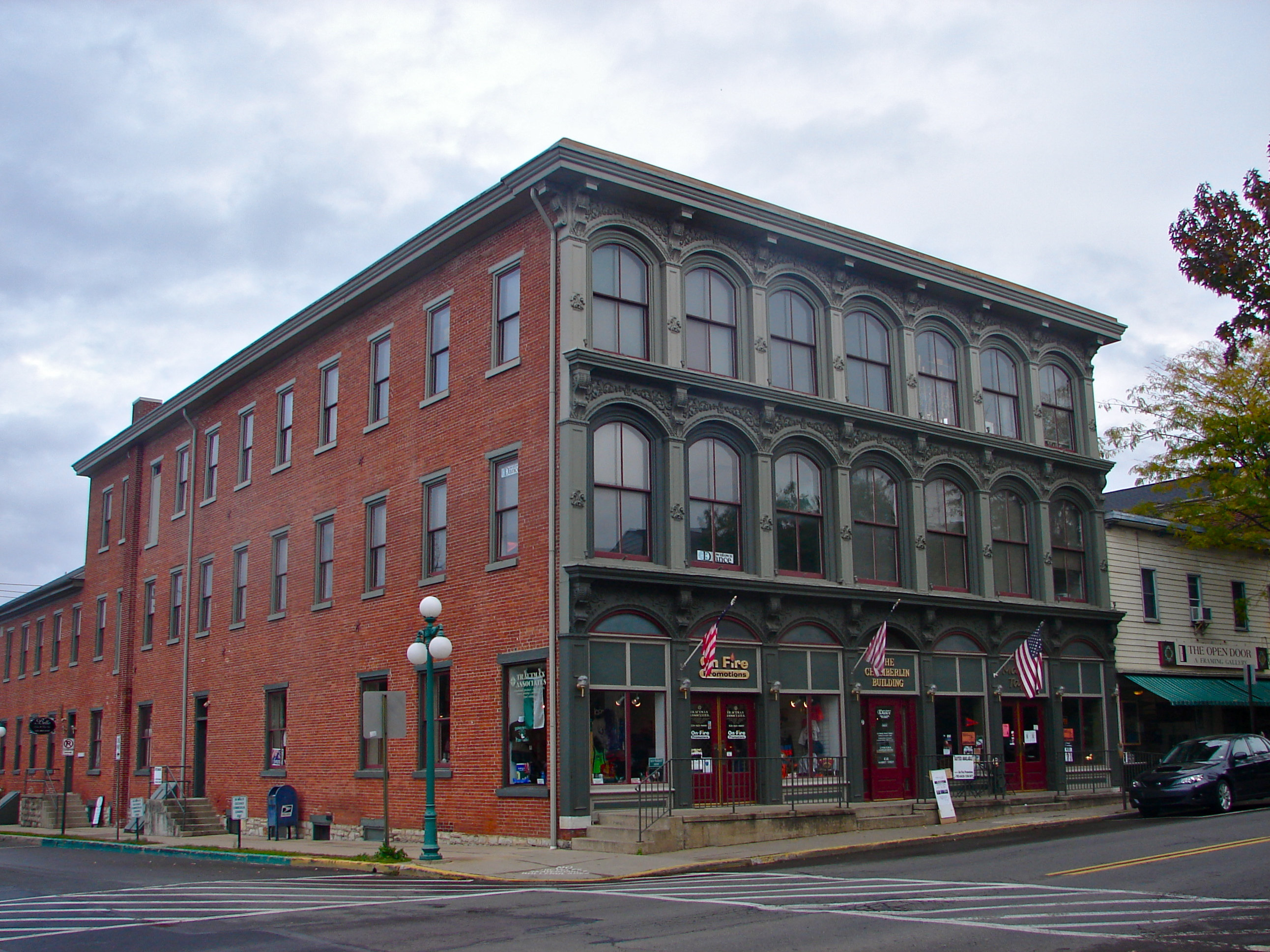
Chamberlin Iron Front Building, built in 1868

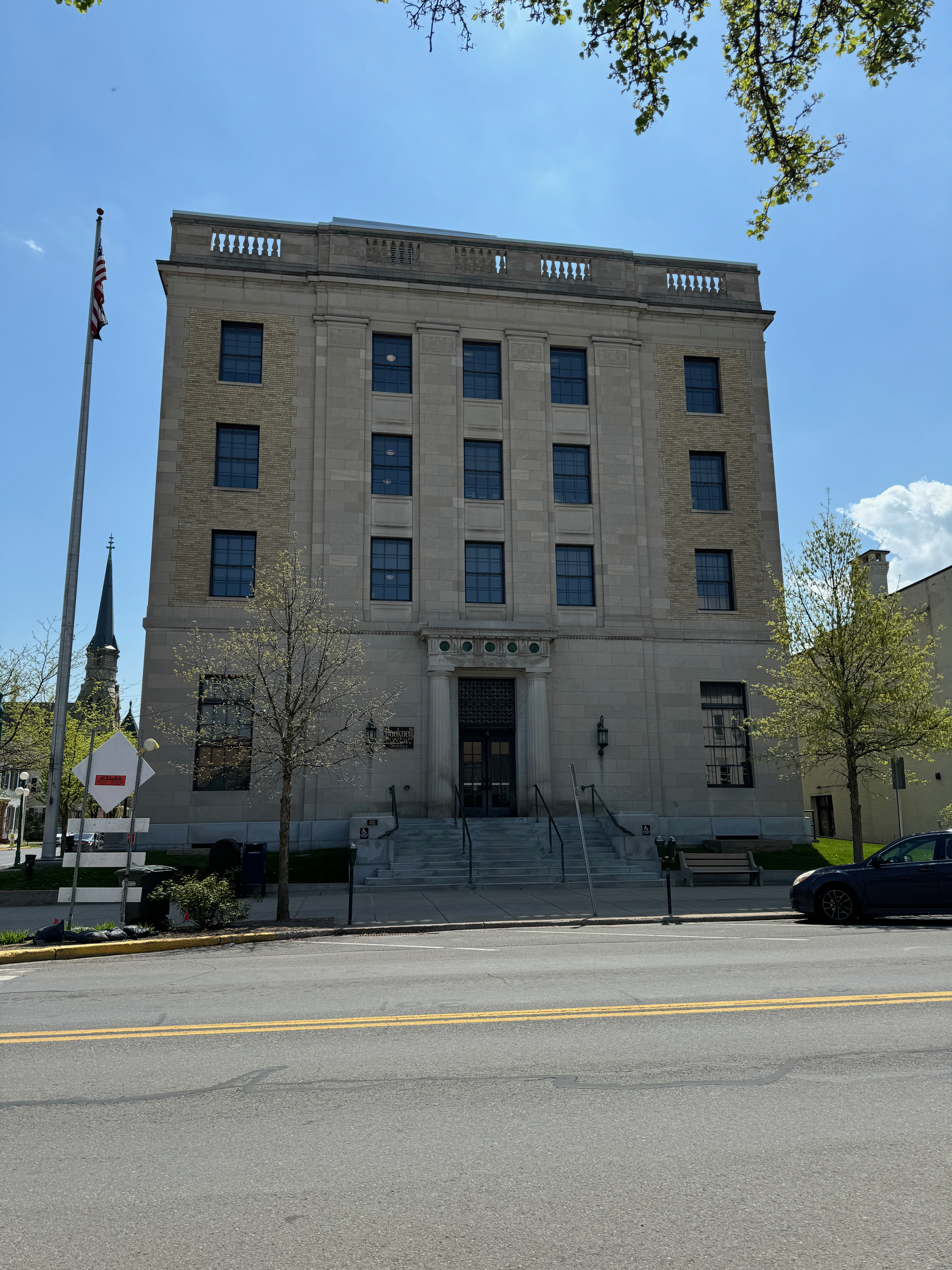
Post Office and Court House, 301 Market Street (1933)

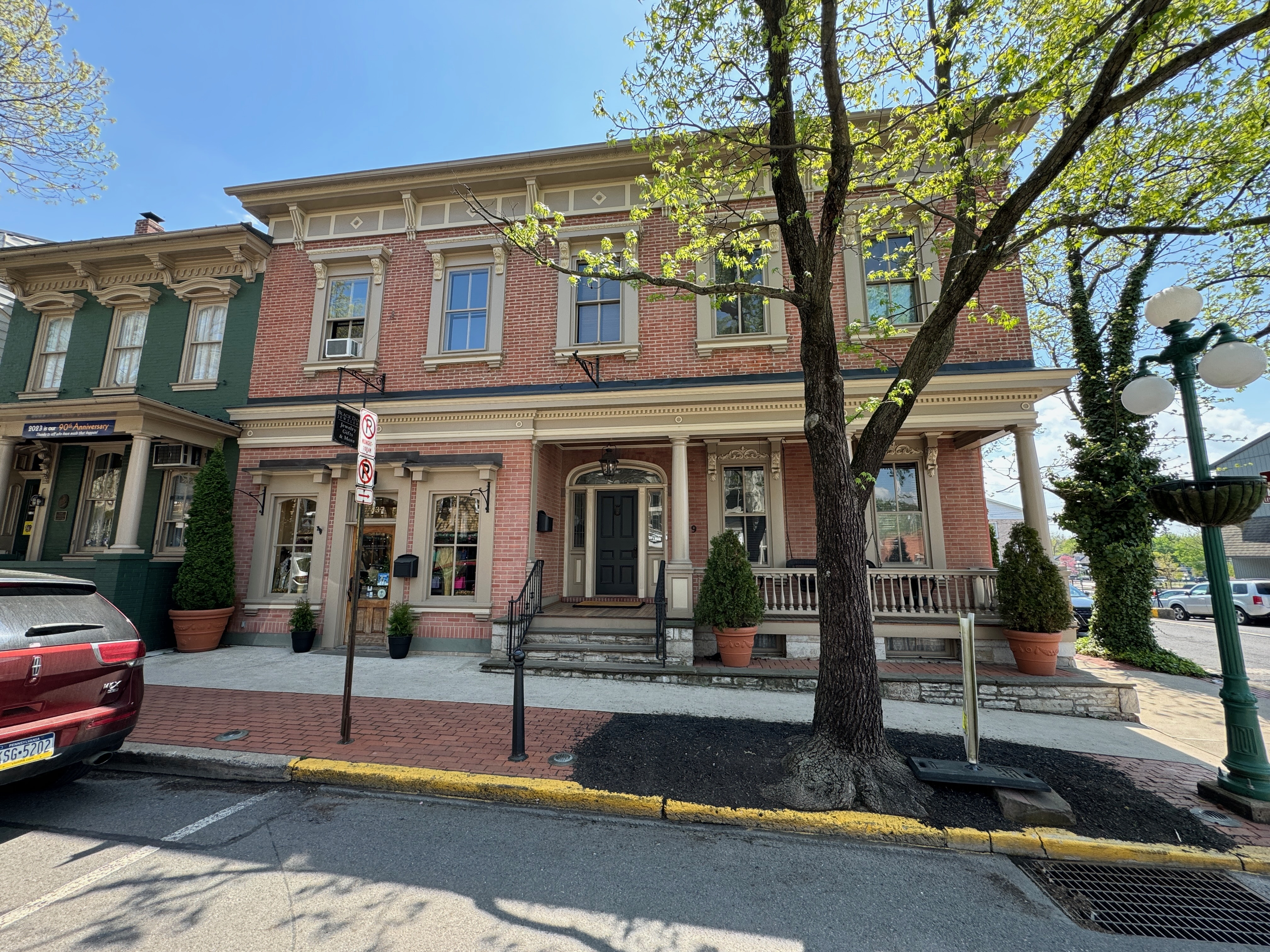
437–439 Market Street (1857)

From east to west (northern side):

- Packwood House-American Hotel, 10 Market Street (1813)
- 12 Market Street (1799)
- First Presbyterian Church, 18 Market Street (1856)
- 100 Market Street (1819)
- 124 Market Street (1820)
- Lewisburg Hotel, 136 Market Street (1834)
- 314–316 Market Street (1864)
- Chamberlin Iron Front Building, 434–440 Market Street (1868)
- 600 Market Street
- 700–702 Market Street (1850)

Southern side:

- 5 Market Street (1840)
- Copper Beech Manor, 17 Market Street (1857)
- 35 Market Street (1829)
- 43 Market Street (1828)
- 101 Market Street (1825)
- 129 Market Street (1845)
- William Cameron House, 137 Market Street (1887)
- 217–223 Market Street (1850)
- 239 Market Street (1915)
- Post Office and Court House, 301 Market Street (1933)
- Union National Bank Building, 311 Market Street (1899)
- Lewisburg National Bank Building, 409 Market Street (1927)
- Campus Theatre, 413 Market Street (1941)
- 437–439 Market Street (1857)
- Hufnagle Park, between South 5th Street and South 6th Street
- 617 Market Street (1890)
- 629 Market Street (1850)
- 701 Market Street (1865)
- 715 Market Street (1856)
- 721 Market Street (1870)
- 727 Market Street (1800)
- 729 Market Street (1870)
