= Lewisburg freight station =

- Reading Railroad Freight Station
- U.S. National Register of Historic Places
- U.S. Historic district – Contributing property
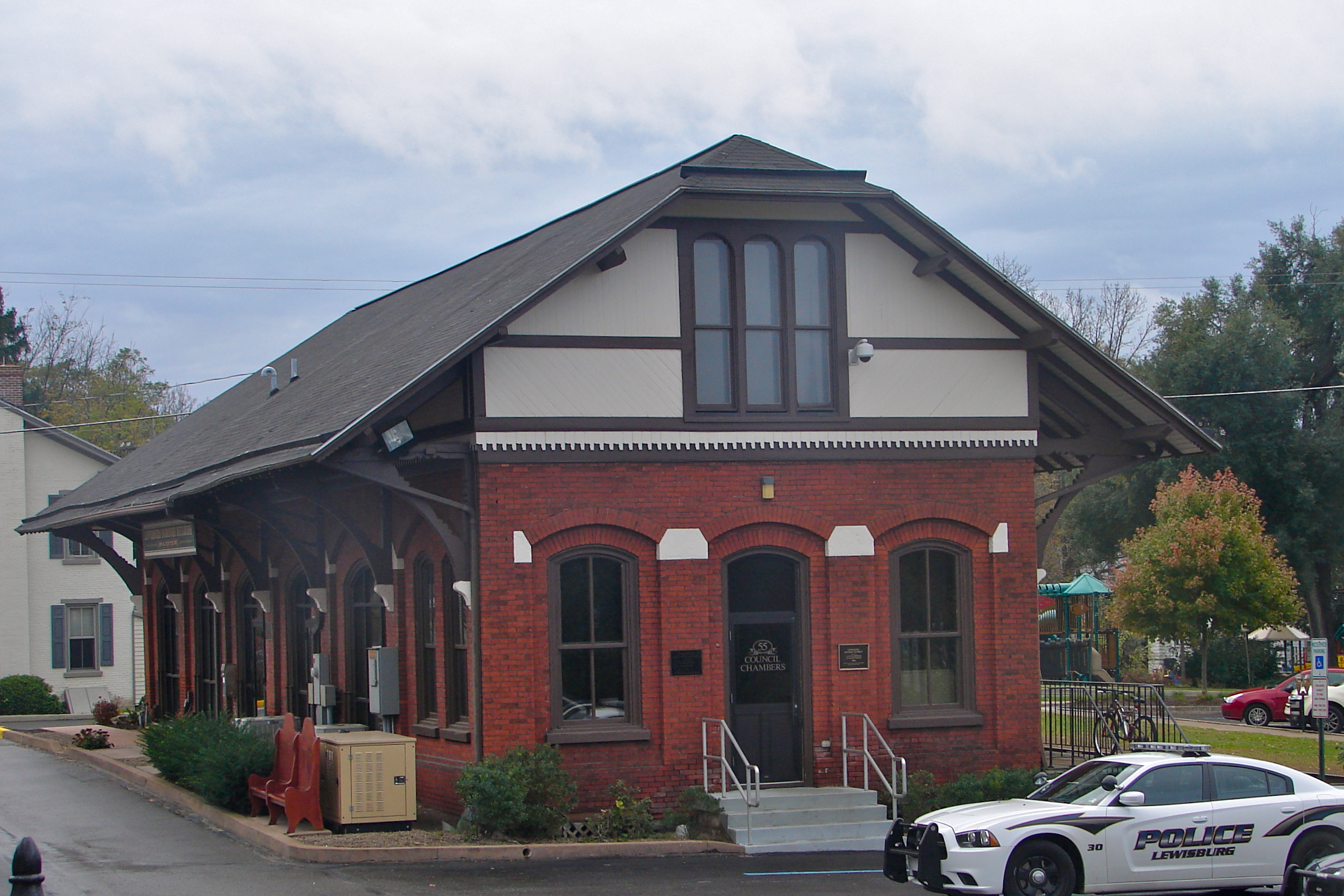
- Lewisburg Freight Depot, October 2011

- Location within Pennsylvania Location within the United States
- Location: Jct. of S. Fifth and St. Louis Sts., Lewisburg, Pennsylvania
- Coordinates: 40°57′48″N 76°53′15″W
- Area: 0.4 acres (0.16 ha)
- Built: 1884
- Architectural style: Late Victorian
- Part of: Lewisburg Historic District (ID04000759)
- NRHP reference No.: 91002012

Significant dates
- Added to NRHP: January 22, 1992
- Designated CP: July 28, 2004

Lewisburg is a historic railroad freight station located in Lewisburg, Pennsylvania, United States.

== History and architectural features ==
Built by the Philadelphia and Reading Railroad in 1884, this historic train station is a one-and-one-half-story, brick and frame building that was created in an eclectic Late Victorian style. The roof consists of a hipped form at the north end and jerkin head gable at the south. Featuring wide, overhanging eaves, exposed rafters, and a freight platform, it was abandoned by Conrail during the 1970s, and then restored and adapted for office use in 1986.

The freight building was listed on the National Register of Historic Places in 1992 as the Reading Railroad Freight Station. It is located in the Lewisburg Historic District, near Hufnagle Park.
