= Lewisburg Historic District (Lewisburg, Pennsylvania) =

Historic district in Pennsylvania, United States

- U.S. National Register of Historic Places
- U.S. Historic district
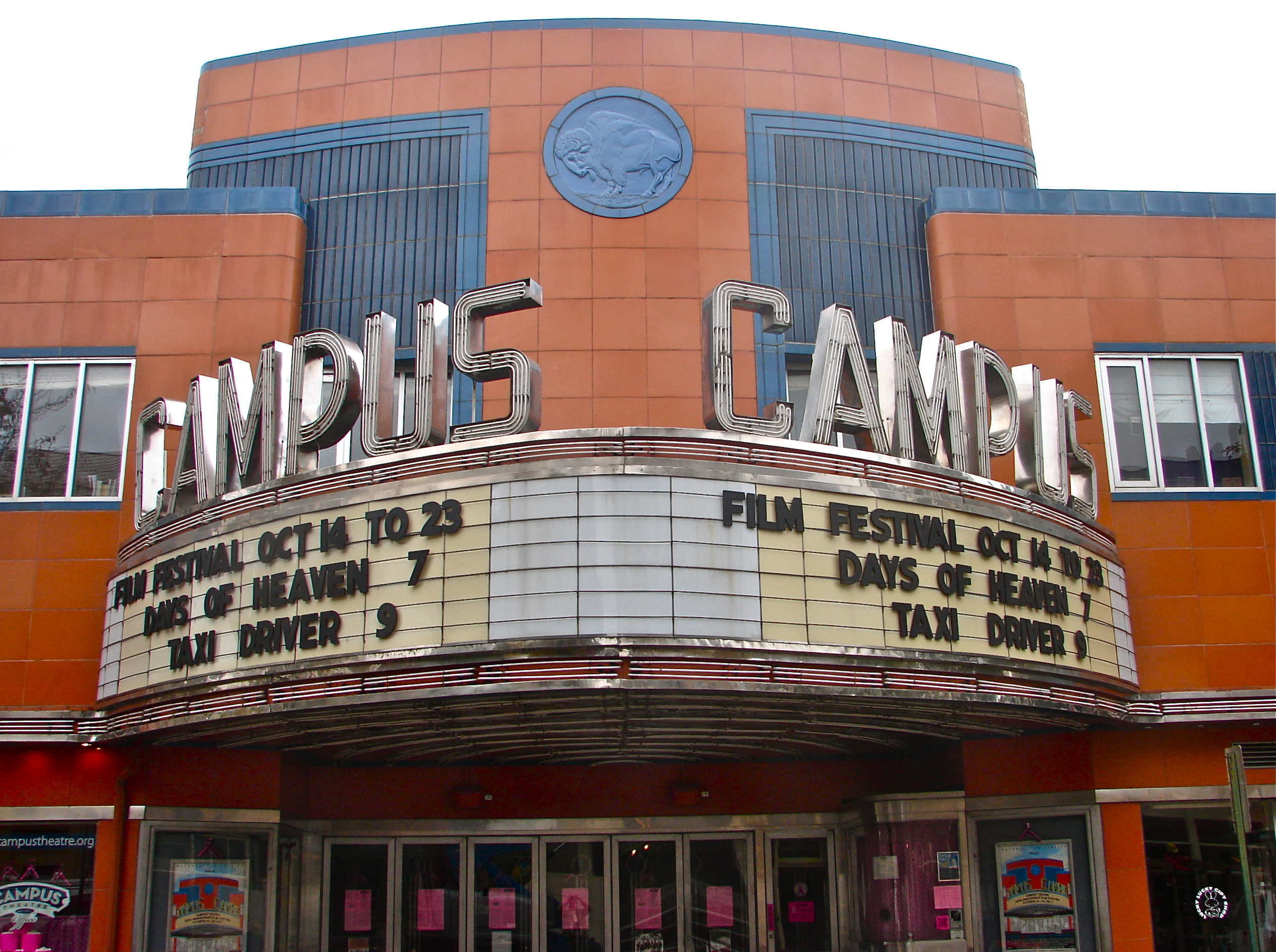
- Campus Theatre, Lewisburg Historic District, October 2011

- Location within Pennsylvania Location within the United States
- Location: Roughly bounded by US 15, Beck St., Susquehanna River and Borough boundary, Lewisburg, Pennsylvania
- Coordinates: 40°57′51″N 76°53′04″W
- Area: 260 acres (110 ha)
- Built: 1773
- Architect: Ackerman & Partridge, et al.
- Architectural style: Italianate, Greek Revival
- NRHP reference No.: 04000759
- Added to NRHP: July 28, 2004

The Lewisburg Historic District is a national historic district that is located in Lewisburg, Union County, Pennsylvania.

It was added to the National Register of Historic Places in 2004.

== History and architectural features ==
This district includes 853 contributing buildings, two contributing sites, eleven contributing structures, and two contributing objects that are located in the central business district and surrounding residential areas of Lewisburg. Notable buildings in this district are: the Derr House (1773), nineteenth- and early-twentieth-century Bucknell University buildings, including Old Main and Bucknell Hall, the Union County Courthouse (1856), the U.S. Post Office and Court House (1933), Himmelreich Library (1902), the First Presbyterian Church (1856), Christ Lutheran Church (1901), Union National Bank (1899), the McClure Building (1913), Campus Theatre (1941), and the Buffalo Mills (1883).

Also located in the district are the separately listed Chamberlin Iron Front Building, Packwood House-American Hotel, and Reading Railroad Freight Station. Contributing sites are the Lewisburg Cemetery and Soldiers Memorial Field. The contributing structures include five railroad bridges and the contributing objects are the Soldiers Memorial Monument (1901) and a commemorative plaque.

It was added to the National Register of Historic Places in 2004.
