= Lewisburg, Pennsylvania =

Borough in Pennsylvania, US

Lewisburg
- Borough
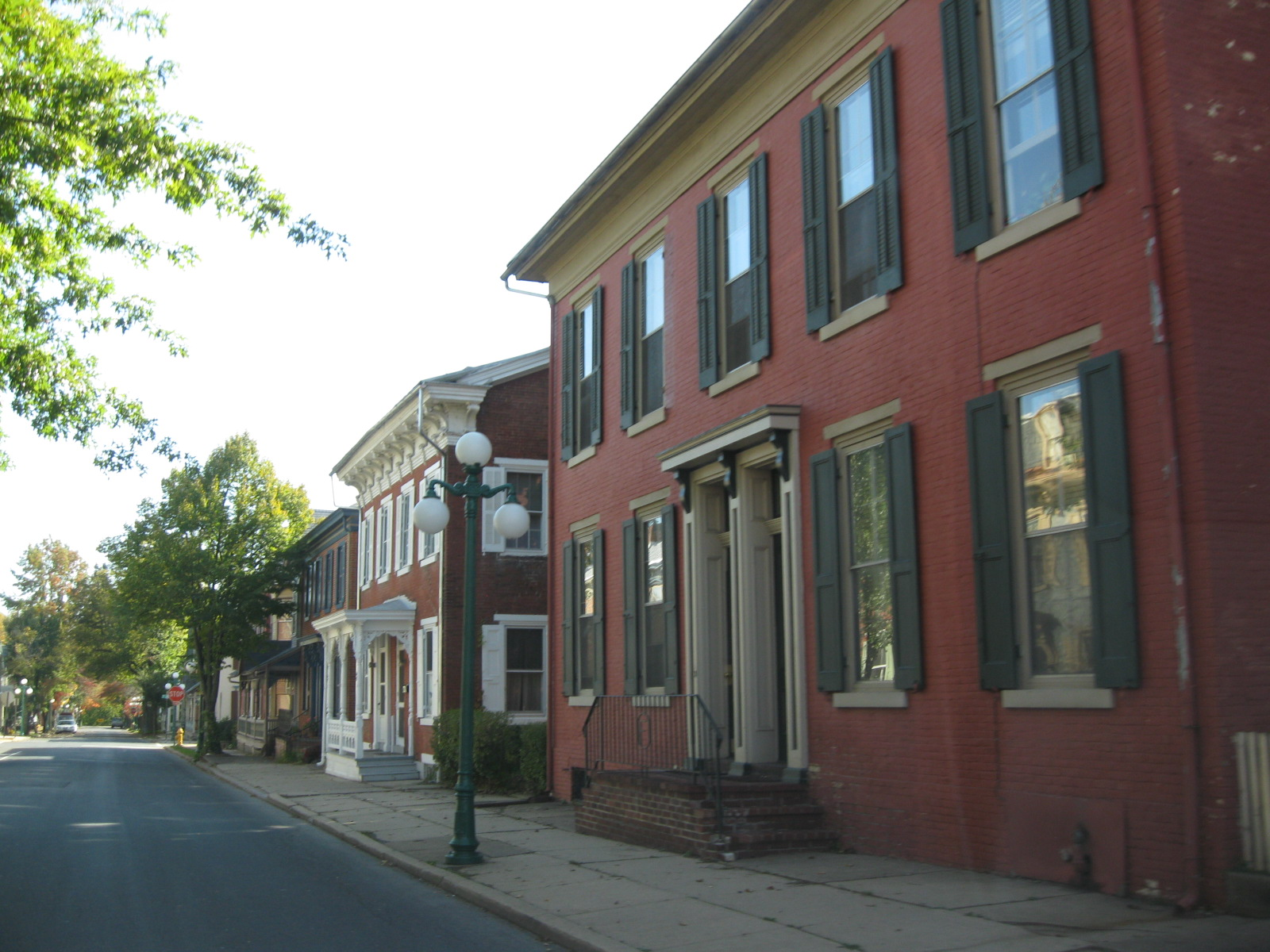
- South 4th Street in Lewisburg

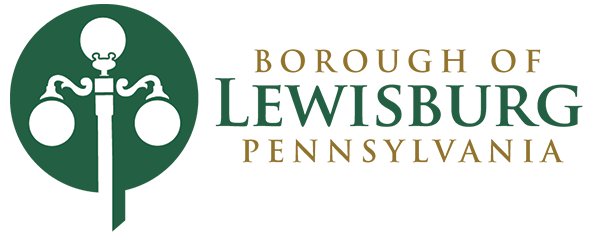
- Logo

- Location of Lewisburg in Union County, Pennsylvania.

- Location within the U.S. state of Pennsylvania Lewisburg (the United States)
- Coordinates: 40°57′50″N 76°53′17″W
- Country: United States
- State: Pennsylvania
- County: Union
- Settled: 1785 (241 years ago)
- Incorporated (borough): March 21, 1812 (214 years ago)

Government
  - Mayor: Kendy Alvarez

Area
  - Total: 0.97 sq mi (2.52 km^{2})
  - Land: 0.97 sq mi (2.52 km^{2})
  - Water: 0 sq mi (0.00 km^{2})

Population (2020)
  - Total: 5,158
  - Density: 5,300.0/sq mi (2,046.36/km^{2})
- Time zone: Eastern (EST)
  - Summer (DST): EDT
- Zip code: 17837
- Area code: 570
- FIPS code: 42-42976
- Website: www.lewisburgborough.org

Lewisburg (Note: officially the Borough of Lewisburg) is a borough in Union County, Pennsylvania, United States, 30 miles (48 km) south by southeast of Williamsport and 60 miles (97 km) north of Harrisburg. The population was 5,158 as of the 2020 census. It is the county seat of Union County. Located in central Pennsylvania's Susquehanna Valley, on the West Branch Susquehanna River, it is home to Bucknell University. Its 19th-century downtown, centered around Market Street, is listed on the National Register of Historic Places. Lewisburg is the principal city of the Lewisburg Micropolitan Statistical Area, and is also part of the larger Bloomsburg–Berwick–Sunbury Combined Statistical Area.

== History ==
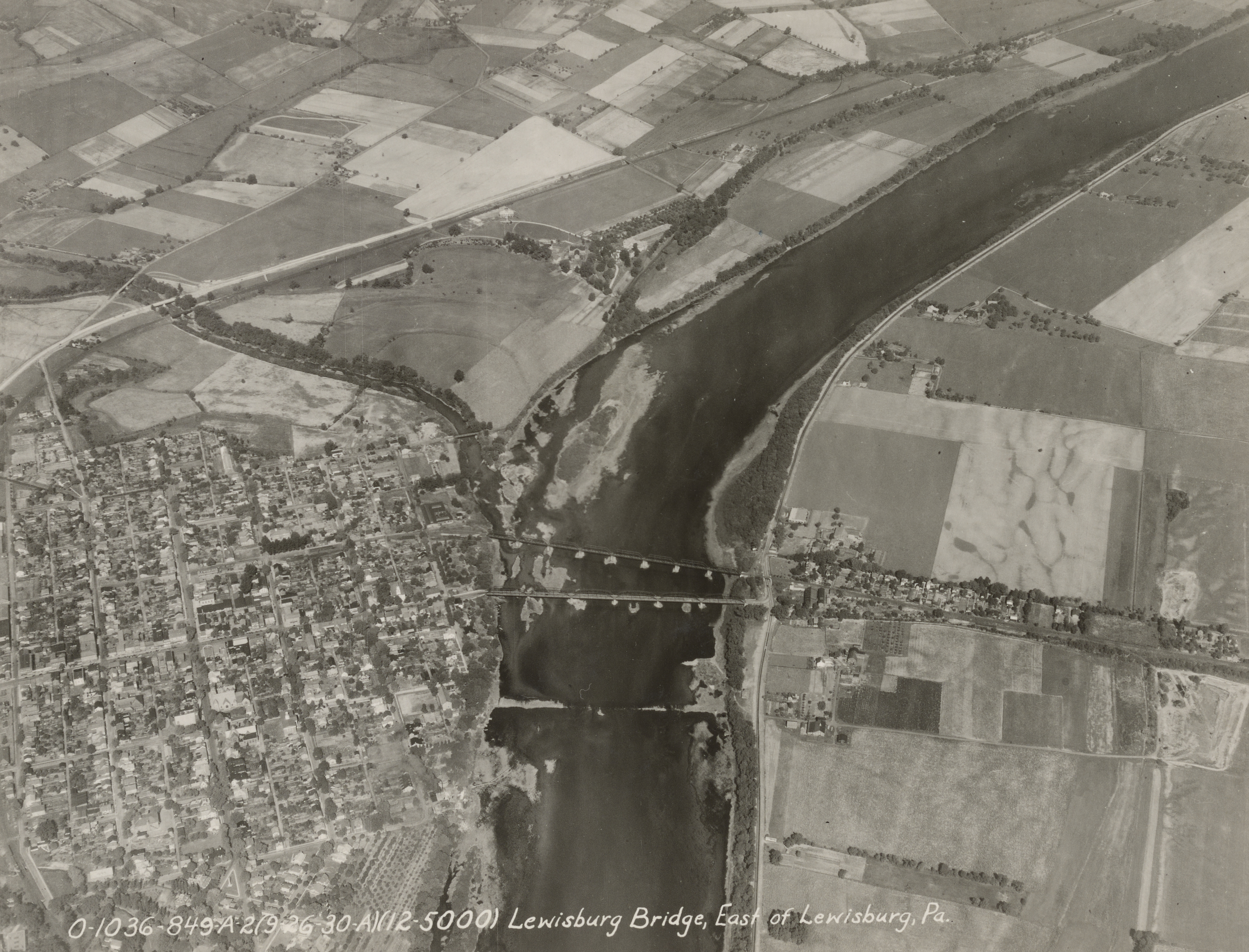
Lewisburg in 1930

Lewisburg was founded in 1785 by Ludwig Derr. A settler of the area (since as early as 1763–1769), Derr purchased several tracts of land from the William Penn family and other neighboring landowners, the largest of which was known as "The Prescott". Having been on the land for such a long time, Derr had befriended the local Native Americans of the area. His relationship with these indigenous peoples was so well founded that, even as many of the other local settlers' homesteads were routinely sacked by Native Americans, Derr's lands remained free from attacks. Subsequently, in 1784, he worked with Samuel Weiser to lay out his combined land tracts, and create Derrstown. The name was later changed to Lewisburgh when Snyder County was created from Union County in 1855 (according to a local Keystone marker sign), but was known on original plans and deeds as Lewisburg before that time.

U.S. Postal Service states that it was named Lewisburgh when it was established in 1796; in 1893, the name was shortened to Lewisburg.

The origin of the street names that run east-west is also unknown. St. George, St. Catherine, and St. Louis appear to be named for saints. While Lutherans, as was Derr, do recognize historic Catholic saints, the street names are more likely named for Derr's family members, whose names happen to coincide with saints. Those streets are consecutively parallel and emanate from what was then Derr's home and the location of the first available lot sold (which were both situated on what is now Mill Street). George was Ludwig's son, his wife was Catherine, and himself, Ludwig/Lewis/Louis (sic). The other original street names that still exist are St. John, St. Mary and St. Anthony, which may be the names of other children from families with whom Derr's own family were friends. However, there is an indication that Derr also had a daughter named Mary. The premise is further supported by the notion that the German word for street is Strasse (Straße, abbreviated St). At the time, street names were pronounced as Strasse Mary or Strasse George. Later, when signs were made to note the street names, the abbreviation for Strasse was allowed to remain, but the US/English abbreviation was redundantly added to the signs.

Over the centuries, Lewisburg has been a center of commerce in Union County. The West Branch Susquehanna River was used for logging and shipping, and remains of old factories and other ancient stone structures exist along the river banks. Prior to, and during, the Civil War, many abolitionists lived in the area, and several locations within the town of Lewisburg served as stopping points on the famous Underground Railroad.

The Susquehanna River has flooded on several occasions, notably in 1889, 1936, and 1972. The 1936 flood saw record-high water levels, while after the 1972 flood, the houses that formerly stood where Hufnagle Park is today were demolished.

The Lewisburg Historic District, Chamberlin Iron Front Building, Packwood House-American Hotel, and Reading Railroad Freight Station are listed on the National Register of Historic Places.

Historic Market Street is the borough's main thoroughfare.

== Geography ==
Lewisburg is located at 40°57′50″N 76°53′17″W (40.963895, -76.888154).

According to the United States Census Bureau, the borough has a total area of 1.0 square mile (2.6 km^{2}), all land.

=== Climate ===
Climate data for Lewisburg, Pennsylvania (1991–2020)
Month	Jan	Feb	Mar	Apr	May	Jun	Jul	Aug	Sep	Oct	Nov	Dec	Year
Mean daily maximum °F (°C)	35.2 (1.8)	38.4 (3.6)	48.0 (8.9)	61.9 (16.6)	71.9 (22.2)	79.7 (26.5)	84.3 (29.1)	82.5 (28.1)	75.3 (24.1)	63.0 (17.2)	50.5 (10.3)	39.6 (4.2)	60.9 (16.0)
Daily mean °F (°C)	27.1 (−2.7)	29.1 (−1.6)	37.6 (3.1)	49.4 (9.7)	59.9 (15.5)	68.6 (20.3)	72.9 (22.7)	71.1 (21.7)	63.8 (17.7)	52.1 (11.2)	40.9 (4.9)	31.9 (−0.1)	50.4 (10.2)
Mean daily minimum °F (°C)	18.9 (−7.3)	19.8 (−6.8)	27.1 (−2.7)	36.9 (2.7)	47.9 (8.8)	57.4 (14.1)	61.5 (16.4)	59.7 (15.4)	52.3 (11.3)	41.2 (5.1)	31.3 (−0.4)	24.3 (−4.3)	39.9 (4.4)
Average precipitation inches (mm)	3.13 (80)	2.41 (61)	3.48 (88)	3.75 (95)	3.93 (100)	3.74 (95)	4.49 (114)	4.28 (109)	4.41 (112)	3.81 (97)	3.10 (79)	3.35 (85)	43.88 (1,115)
Average snowfall inches (cm)	8.0 (20)	7.8 (20)	5.3 (13)	0.8 (2.0)	0.0 (0.0)	0.0 (0.0)	0.0 (0.0)	0.0 (0.0)	0.0 (0.0)	0.2 (0.51)	1.3 (3.3)	5.4 (14)	28.8 (72.81)
Source: NOAA

== Demographics ==
Historical population
Census	Pop.	Note	%±
1830	914		—
1850	2,012		—
1860	2,666		32.5%
1870	3,121		17.1%
1880	3,080		−1.3%
1890	3,248		5.5%
1900	3,457		6.4%
1910	3,081		−10.9%
1920	3,204		4.0%
1930	3,308		3.2%
1940	3,571		8.0%
1950	5,268		47.5%
1960	5,523		4.8%
1970	6,376		15.4%
1980	5,407		−15.2%
1990	5,785		7.0%
2000	5,620		−2.9%
2010	5,792		3.1%
2020	5,158		−10.9%

As of the census of 2000, there were 5,620 people, 1,778 households, and 787 families residing in the borough. The population density was 5,724.7 inhabitants per square mile (2,210.3/km^{2}). There were 1,938 housing units at an average density of 1,974.1 units per square mile (762.2 units/km^{2}). The racial makeup of the borough was 91.57% White, 2.62% African American, 0.19% Native American, 2.79% Asian, 0.11% Pacific Islander, 1.00% from other races, and 1.74% from two or more races. Hispanic or Latino of any race were 2.33% of the population.

There were 1,778 households, out of which 17.5% had children under the age of 18 living with them, 33.7% were married couples living together, 8.5% had a female householder with no husband present, and 55.7% were non-families. 42.9% of all households were made up of individuals, and 16.6% had someone living alone who was 65 years of age or older. The average household size was 1.97 and the average family size was 2.64.

In the borough the population was spread out, with 10.0% under the age of 18, 45.9% from 18 to 24, 16.4% from 25 to 44, 12.8% from 45 to 64, and 14.8% who were 65 years of age or older. The median age was 22 years. For every 100 females, there were 87.3 males. For every 100 females age 18 and over, there were 84.3 males.

The median income for a household in the borough was $30,137, and the median income for a family was $53,409. Males had a median income of $32,727 versus $25,436 for females. The per capita income for the borough was $14,146. About 6.3% of families and 22.2% of the population were below the poverty line, including 12.9% of those under age 18 and 6.2% of those age 65 or over.

== Parks and recreation ==
Hufnagle Park is located along Bull Run in the heart of downtown. It offers open space, a picnic pavilion, playground equipment, and gardens. It is named in honor of former Public Safety director Gordon Hufnagle. Officer Hufnagle died saving lives during the Agnes Flood on June 21, 1972. A covered footbridge just north of the park was built in his honor in 1982.

The Lewisburg Community Garden is a joint venture between Lewisburg Borough and Bucknell University. Opened in 2012, the community garden provides educational opportunities for students and area residents, rents garden plots, and grows and donates 3,800 pounds of organic produce to local food access programs.

Other parks in the borough are: Soldier's Memorial Park and Mariah's Garden (both located on the Susquehanna River), Lewisburg Area Recreation Park, Wolfe Field and St. Anthony Street Park, and D.F. Green Field.

== Education ==
It is in the Lewisburg Area School District.

A portion of Bucknell University resides in the Lewisburg borough limits. The university has a Lewisburg postal address.

== Government ==
The Federal Bureau of Prisons Federal Correctional Institution, Lewisburg is in Kelly Township.

Lewisburg is located in Pennsylvania's 15th Congressional District.

== Notable people ==
- Ward R. Bliss, Pennsylvania State Representative (1889–1905)
- Thaddeus Mortimer Fowler, cartographer, who lived in Lewisburg between 1881 and 1885
- Jason Bohn, professional golfer, was born in Lewisburg
- Doug Lebda, founder and CEO of LendingTree, was born and raised in Lewisburg
- George H. Ramer, U.S. Marine Corps Medal of Honor winner graduated from and taught at Lewisburg High School and is buried in Lewisburg Cemetery
- Christy Mathewson, Major League Baseball player and one of first five inductees into the National Baseball Hall of Fame and Museum attended Bucknell University and is buried in Lewisburg Cemetery
- Berhanu Nega, Ethiopian politician, taught at Bucknell University
- Philip Roth, prolific Jewish novelist, attended Bucknell University
- Mary Oliver, American poet, moved to Lewisburg in 1986 to be the "Poet in Residence"

== Gallery ==
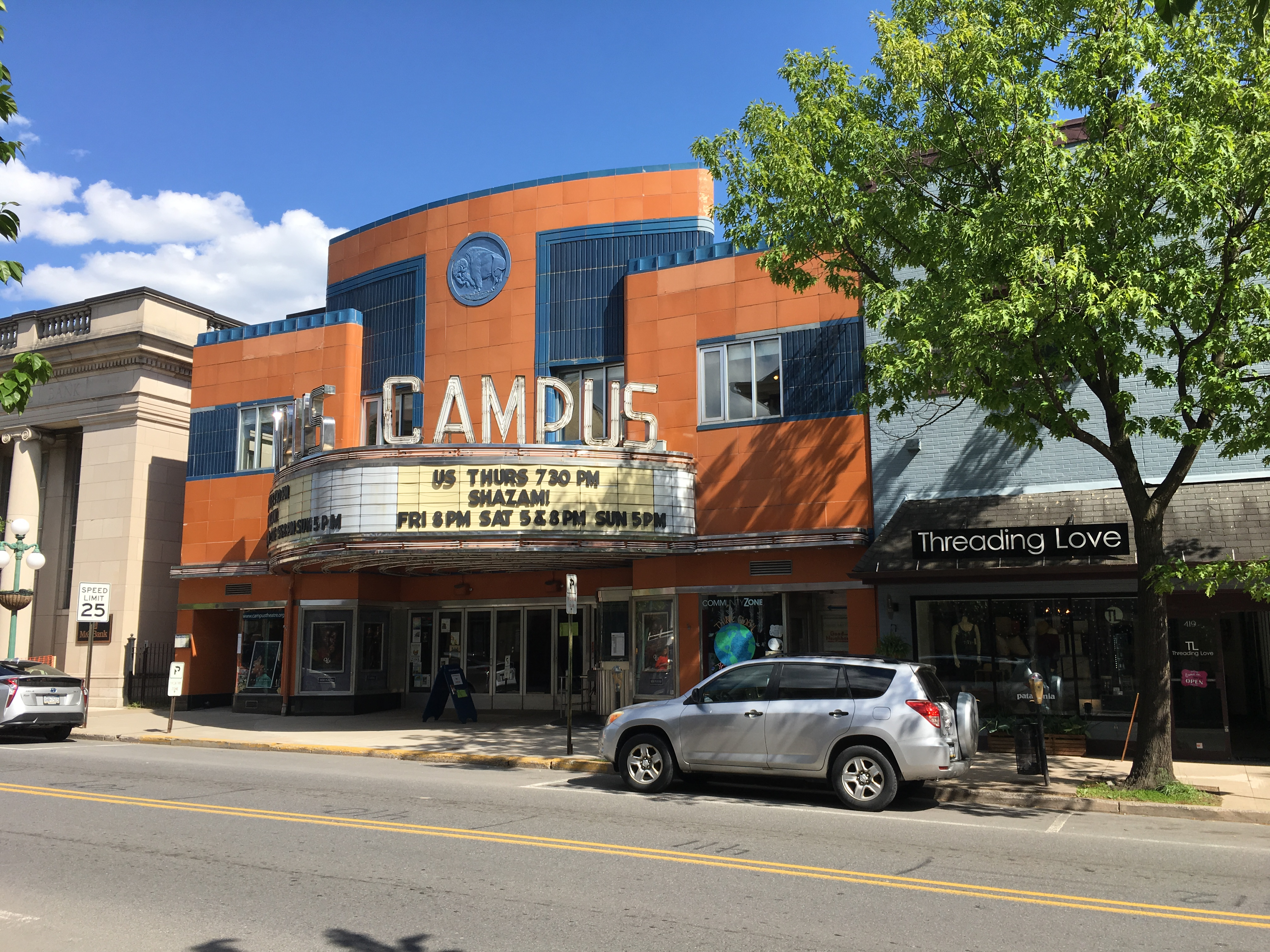
Campus Theatre (1939) built in the Streamline Moderne style.

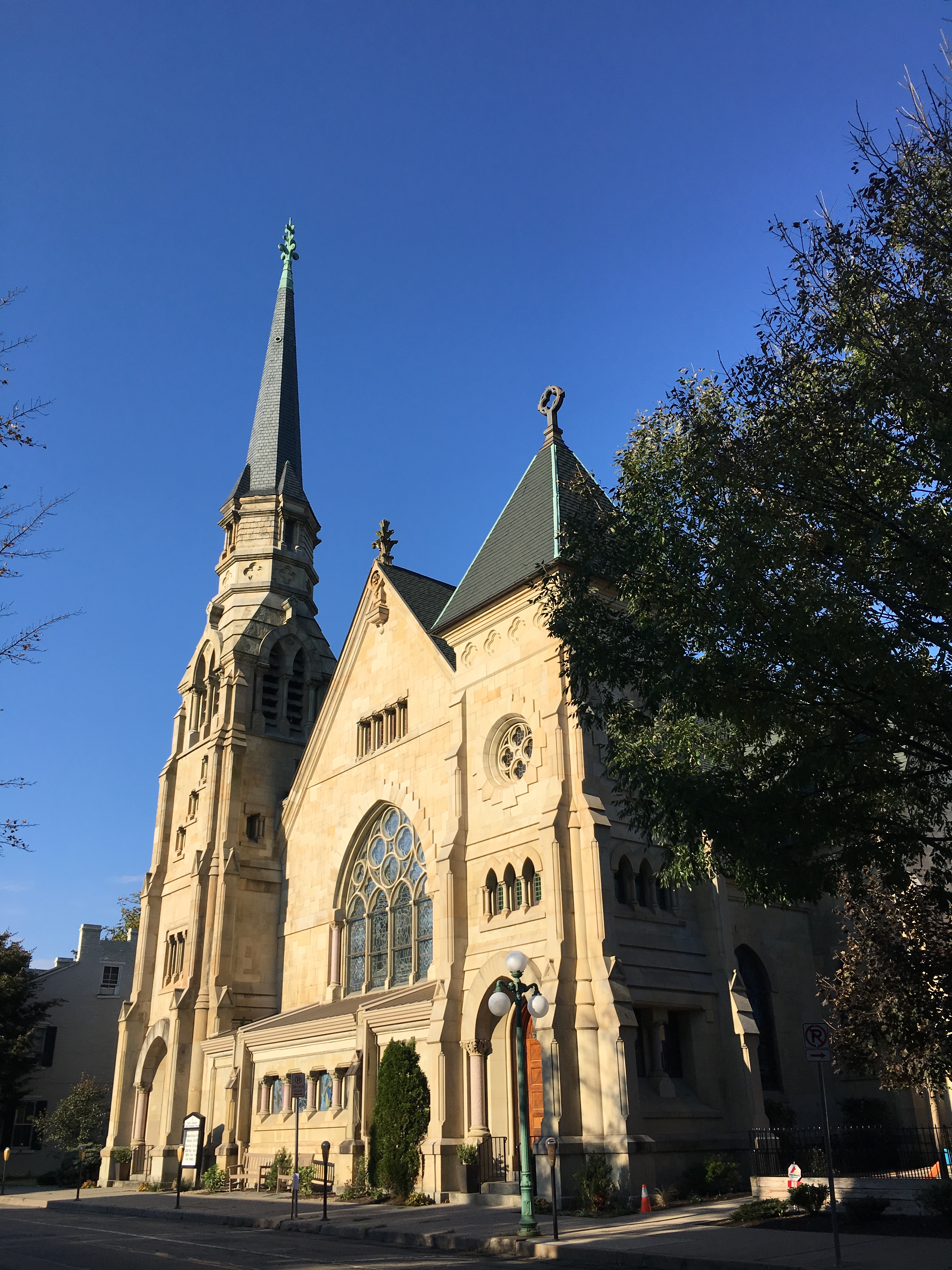
Beaver Memorial Methodist Church (1890) one of four Victorian Gothic churches in Lewisburg.

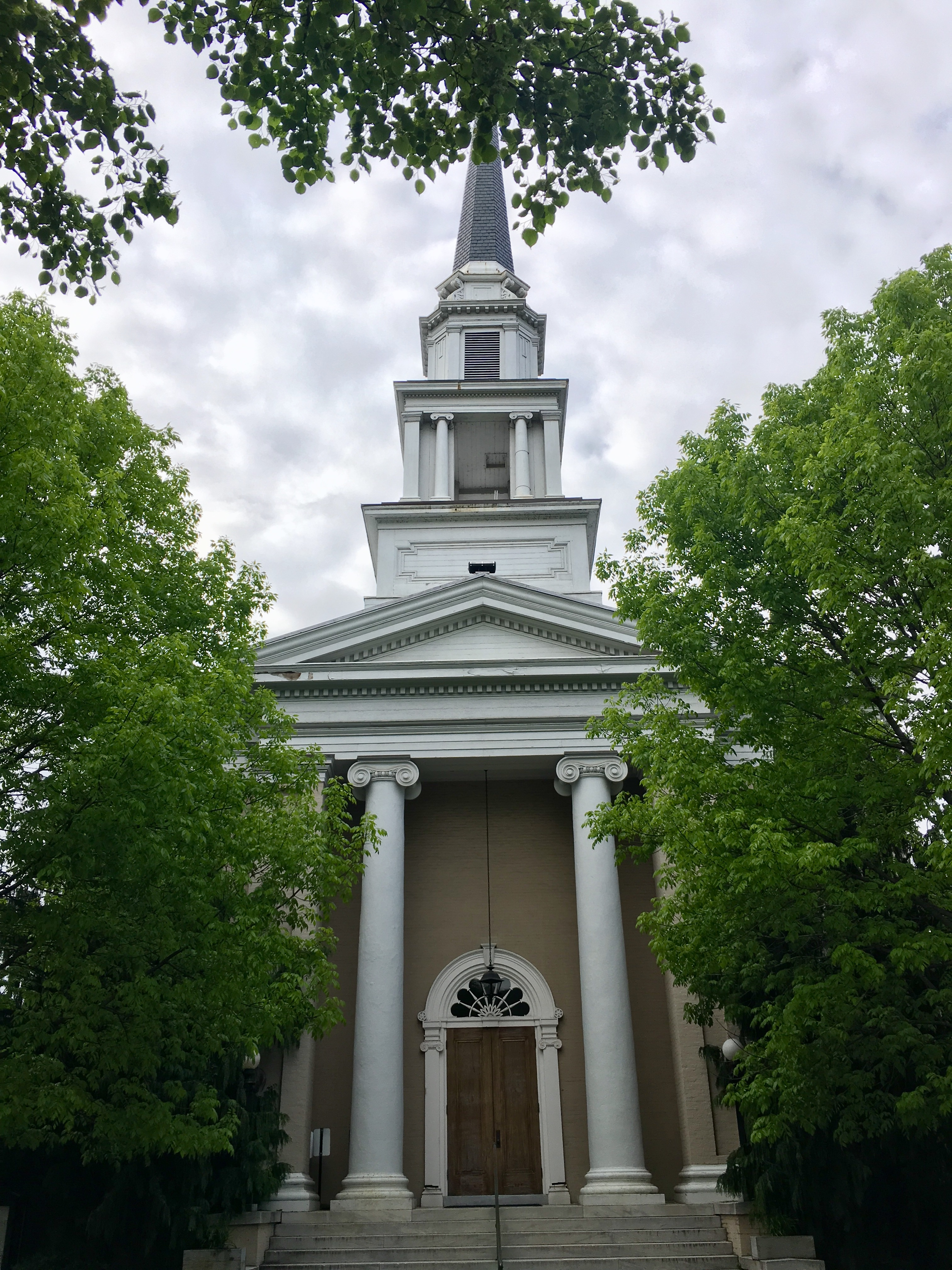
Entrance to the First Presbyterian Church (1856) in the Greek Revival style.

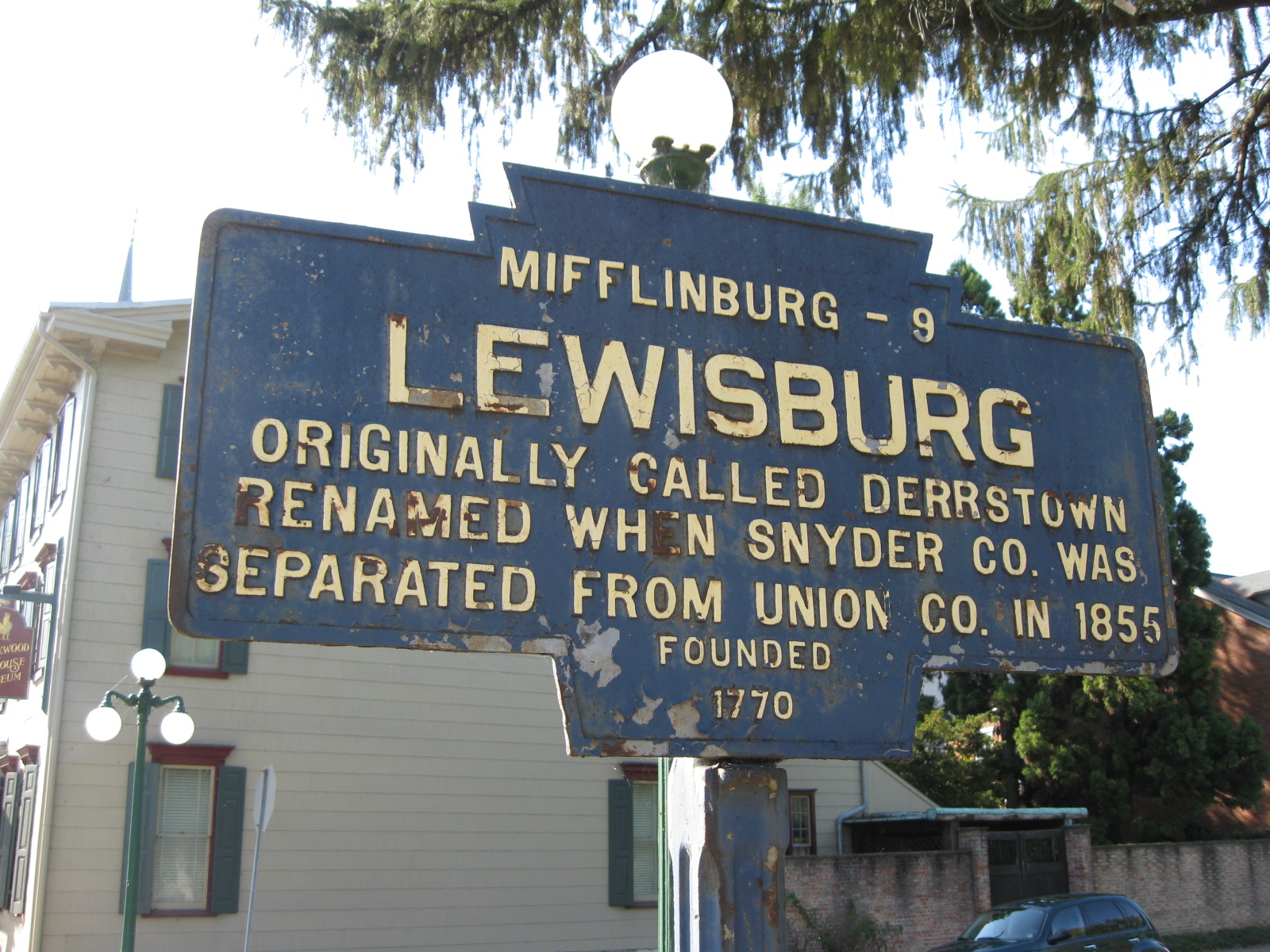
Keystone marker
