= Torpedo (disambiguation) =

A torpedo is a self-propelled explosive projectile that operates underwater.

Torpedo may also refer to:

== Animals ==
- Torpedo (genus), the genus of electric rays
  - More generally, any electric ray (order Torpediniformes)

== Food ==
- Torpedo or Torpil, a Turkish and Balkan dessert
- Liquorice torpedo
- "Syrian torpedo", English-language slang for a kibbeh, a torpedo-shaped stuffed croquette
- One of the many slang terms for a submarine sandwich

== Weapons ==
- Formerly a naval mine, a stationary explosive device placed in water, to destroy vessels
- Spar torpedo, an explosive device affixed to a spar extending from a boat, used to attack other vessels
- land torpedo, an obsolete term for land mine
- "Aerial torpedo", a naval term for early flying bombs and pilotless aircraft weapons
- Aerial torpedo, a self-propelled torpedo dropped into the water from aircraft
- Bangalore torpedo, an explosive device for land use
- Human torpedo, also called "Chariot", a variety of swimmer delivery vehicle of World War II

== Transport ==
- Torpedo wagon, also known as a bottle wagon, a tank car design to carry molten steel
- Torpedo (car), an early form of usually large touring coachwork with smooth shape from front to rear
- Railroad torpedo, a device to warn approaching trains upon entering protected trackage
- Narco torpedo, a type of clandestine towed underwater barge used for illicit cargos
- Pontiac Torpedo, a full-sized car produced by Pontiac from the 1940 through the 1948 model years

== Music ==
- "Torpedo", a 1995 song by Eraserheads from the album Cutterpillow
- Torpedo (album), a 2022 album by Welsh band Feeder

== Fiction ==
- Torpedo (comics) or Torpedo 1936, a Spanish comic book series
- Torpedo (2012 film), a Belgian film by Matthieu Donck
- Torpedo (2019 film), a Belgian action and war film
- Torpedo (Marvel Comics), a Marvel Comics character
- Torpedo (G.I. Joe), a character in the G.I. Joe universe
- Photon torpedo, fictional weapon popularized by the science fiction saga Star Trek
- Torpedo (Bob's Burgers), an episode of the animated series Bob's Burgers

== Sports ==
- FC Torpedo Kharkiv, a former Ukrainian Football Club
- FC Torpedo Kutaisi, a Georgian Football Club
- FC Torpedo Minsk, a Belarusian Football Club
- FC Torpedo Moscow, a Russian Football Club
- FC Torpedo-RG, a Russian Football Club
- FC Torpedo Zaporizhzhia, a Ukrainian Football Club
- FC Torpedo-ZIL, a defunct Russian Football Club, now FC Moscow
- FC Torpedo-BelAZ Zhodino, a Belarusian Football Club
- HC Torpedo Nizhny Novgorod, a Russian Ice Hockey Club
- Torpedo punt, a specialised kick used in Australian Rules Football
- Torpedo system, a strategy in ice hockey
- "The Torpedo", a nickname of the Russian auto racing driver Daniil Kvyat
- "Torpedo" Tom Blower (1914–1955), British long-distance swimmer
- "Thorpedo", a nickname of the Australian swimmer Ian Thorpe

== Other uses ==
- Torpedo! (wargame), a 1979 board wargame about submarine warfare during World War II
- Torpedo (petroleum), explosive used in an oil well to start or increase the flow of oil
- Torpedo, Pennsylvania
- "Torpedo", 1920s slang for a hit man or "hired gun"
- "Torpedo", in American cigar slang, a cigar with a pointed tip, also called a pyramid or belicoso
- A type of drinking game (see shotgunning)
- A US beer keg with a capacity of 5.23 US gallons
