= Fracking =

Fracturing bedrock by pressurized liquid

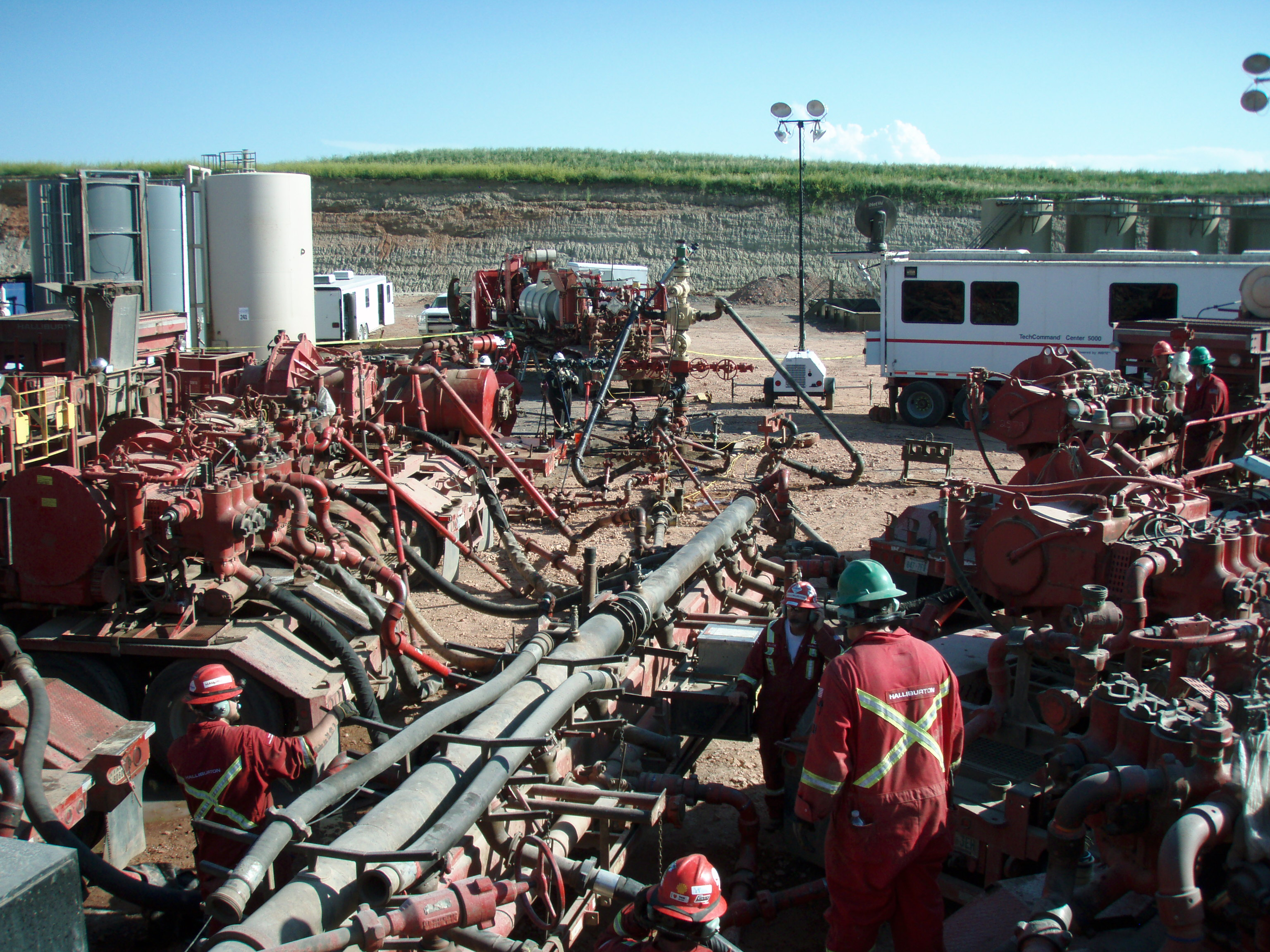
- Fracking the Bakken Formation in North Dakota
- Process type: Mechanical
- Industrial sector(s): Mining
- Main technologies or sub-processes: Fluid pressure
- Product(s): Natural gas, petroleum
- Inventor: Floyd Farris, Joseph B. Clark (Stanolind Oil and Gas Corporation)
- Year of invention: 1947

Fracking (also known as hydraulic fracturing, fracing, hydrofracturing, or hydrofracking) is a well stimulation technique involving the fracturing of formations in bedrock by a pressurized liquid. The process involves the high-pressure injection of "fracking fluid" (primarily water, containing sand or other proppants suspended with the aid of thickening agents) into a wellbore to create cracks in the deep-rock formations through which natural gas, petroleum, and brine will flow more freely. When the hydraulic pressure is removed from the well, small grains of hydraulic fracturing proppants (either sand or aluminium oxide) hold the fractures open.

Fracking, using either hydraulic pressure or acid, is the most common method for well stimulation. Well stimulation techniques help create pathways for oil, gas or water to flow more easily, ultimately increasing the overall production of the well. Both methods of fracking are classed as unconventional, because they aim to permanently enhance, or increase, the permeability of the formation. Thus, the traditional division of hydrocarbon-bearing rocks into source and reservoir no longer holds; the source rock becomes the reservoir after the treatment.

Hydraulic fracking is more familiar to the general public, and is the predominant method used in hydrocarbon exploitation, but acid fracking has a much longer history. The hydrocarbon industry tends to use fracturing, although the word fracking now dominates in popular media.

== Definition ==
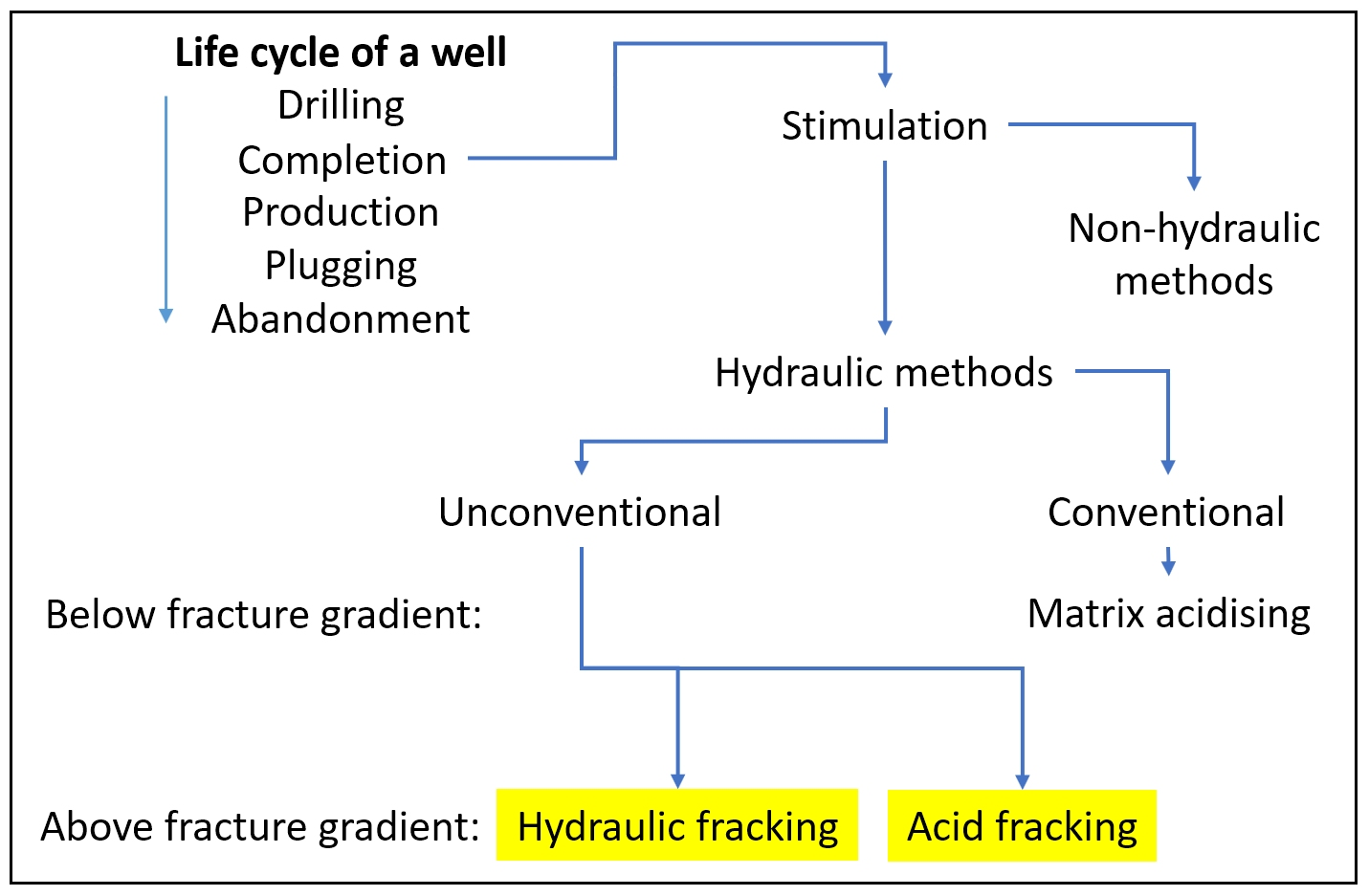
Well stimulation methods. Fracking is highlighted in yellow.

Hydraulic fracturing (fracking) and acidising (acid fracking) are two of the most common methods for well stimulation. The flow chart shows that hydraulic fracking and acid fracking, highlighted in yellow, are both classified as unconventional hydraulic methods. Acidising is complicated, however, by the fact that matrix acidising, which takes place below the fracture gradient of the rock, is considered a conventional method.

In the UK legislative and hydrocarbon permitting context (see Fracking in the United Kingdom), Adriana Zalucka et al. have reviewed the various definitions, as well as the role of key regulators and authorities, in a peer-reviewed article published in 2021. They have proposed a new robust definition for unconventional well treatments:

All well stimulation treatments of oil and gas wells which increase the permeability of the target rock volume to higher than 0.1 millidarcies beyond a 1 m radius from the borehole.

The above definition focuses on increasing permeability, rather than on any particular extraction process. It is quantitative, using the generally agreed 0.1 md cut-off value, below which rocks are considered impermeable. It exempts borehole cleaning processes like acid squeeze or acid wash from being classed as unconventional, by using the 1 m radius criterion. It avoids a definition based on, for example, the quantity of water injected, which is controversial, or the injection pressure applied, which determines whether the treatment is above or below the fracture gradient. It also exempts non-hydrocarbon wells from being classed as unconventional.

A low permeability (by consensus defined as less than 0.1 millidarcies) implies that the resource is unconventional, meaning that it requires special methods to extract the resource. Above that value, conventional methods suffice. Unconventional resources are also characterised by being widely distributed, with low energy density (i.e. in a low concentration) and ill-defined in volume. There are no discrete boundaries, in contrast to those bounding a conventional hydrocarbon reservoir.

Although the definition above was developed within the UK context, it is universally applicable, and takes into account the views of the hydrocarbon industry and the US Geological Survey, in particular.

== Hydraulic fracking ==
Hydraulic fracking (Note: Also known as hydraulic fracturing, fracing, fraccing, hydrofracturing, hydrofracking, or simply fracking.) is the most commonly used well stimulation technique. It involves the fracturing of formations in bedrock by a pressurized liquid. The process involves the high-pressure injection of "fracking fluid" (primarily water, containing sand or other proppants suspended with the aid of thickening agents) into a wellbore to create cracks in the deep-rock formations through which natural gas, petroleum, and brine will flow more freely. When the hydraulic pressure is removed from the well, small grains of hydraulic fracturing proppants (either sand or aluminium oxide) hold the fractures open.

Hydraulic fracking began as an experiment in 1947, and the first commercially successful application followed in 1949. As of 2012, 2.5 million "frac jobs" had been performed worldwide on oil and gas wells, over one million of those within the U.S. Such treatment is generally necessary to achieve adequate flow rates in shale gas, tight gas, tight oil, and coal seam gas wells. Some hydraulic fractures can form naturally in certain veins or dikes. Drilling and hydraulic fracking have made the United States a major crude oil exporter as of 2019, but leakage of methane, a potent greenhouse gas, has dramatically increased. Increased oil and gas production from the decade-long fracking boom has led to lower prices for consumers, with near-record lows of the share of household income going to energy expenditures.

Fracking is highly controversial. Its proponents highlight the economic benefits of more extensively accessible hydrocarbons (such as petroleum and natural gas), the benefits of replacing coal with natural gas, which burns more cleanly and emits less carbon dioxide (CO_{2}), and the benefits of energy independence. Opponents of fracking argue that these are outweighed by the environmental impacts, which include groundwater and surface water contamination, noise and air pollution, the triggering of earthquakes, and the resulting hazards to public health and the environment. Research has found adverse health effects in populations living near hydraulic fracturing sites, including confirmation of chemical, physical, and psychosocial hazards such as pregnancy and birth outcomes, migraine headaches, chronic rhinosinusitis, severe fatigue, asthma exacerbations and psychological stress. Adherence to regulation and safety procedures are required to avoid further negative impacts.

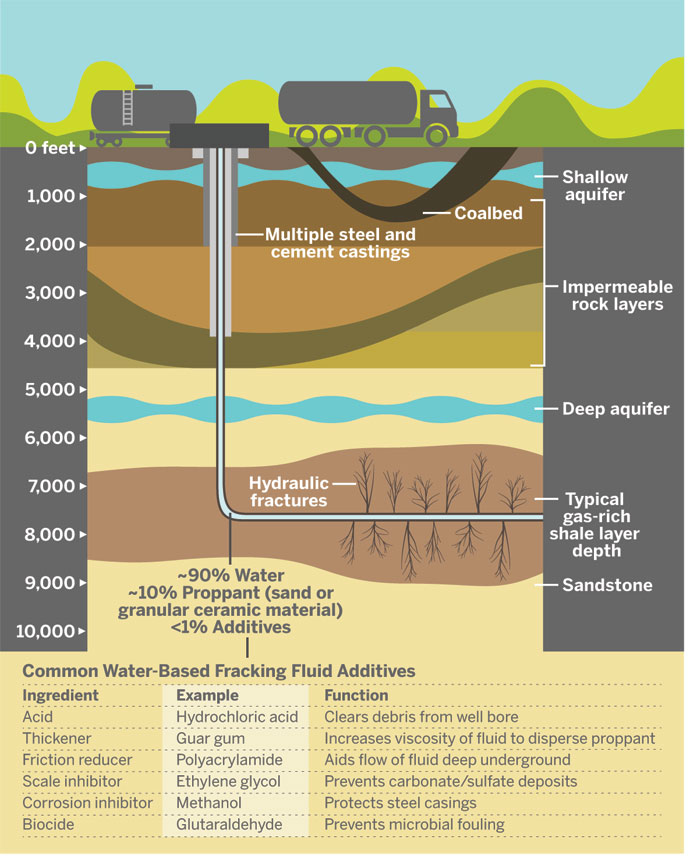
A graphic created to argue that modern-era fracking poses no risk of groundwater contamination.

The scale of methane leakage associated with hydraulic fracking is uncertain, and there is some evidence that leakage may cancel out any benefit in terms of greenhouse gas emissions from natural gas relative to other fossil fuels.

Increases in seismic activity following hydraulic fracking along dormant or previously unknown faults are sometimes caused by the deep-injection disposal of fracking flowback fluid (a byproduct of hydraulically fracked wells), and produced formation brine (a byproduct of both fractured and non-fractured oil and gas wells). For these reasons, hydraulic fracturing is under international scrutiny, restricted in some countries, and banned altogether in others. Up until 2014, the European Union was drafting regulations that would permit the controlled application of hydraulic fracturing. However, it has not yet established a complete regulatory framework; some member states, including France, Bulgaria and the Republic of Ireland, have banned it.

== Geology ==
=== Mechanics ===
Fracturing rocks at great depth frequently become suppressed by pressure due to the weight of the overlying rock strata and the cementation of the formation. This suppression process is particularly significant in "tensile" (Mode 1) fractures which require the walls of the fracture to move against this pressure. Fracturing occurs when effective stress is overcome by the pressure of fluids within the rock. The minimum principal stress becomes tensile and exceeds the tensile strength of the material. Fractures formed in this way are generally oriented in a plane perpendicular to the minimum principal stress, and, for this reason, hydraulic fractures in wellbores can be used to determine the orientation of stresses. In natural examples, such as dikes or vein-filled fractures, the orientations can be used to infer past states of stress.

=== Veins ===
Most mineral vein systems are a result of repeated natural fracturing during periods of relatively high pore fluid pressure. The effect of high pore fluid pressure on the formation process of mineral vein systems is particularly evident in "crack-seal" veins, where the vein material is part of a series of discrete fracturing events, and extra vein material is deposited on each occasion. One example of long-term repeated natural fracturing is in the effects of seismic activity. Stress levels rise and fall episodically, and earthquakes can cause large volumes of connate water to be expelled from fluid-filled fractures. This process is referred to as "seismic pumping".

=== Dikes ===
Minor intrusions in the upper part of the crust, such as dikes, propagate in the form of fluid-filled cracks. In such cases, the fluid is magma. In sedimentary rocks with a significant water content, the fluid at the fracture tip will be steam.

== History ==
=== Precursors ===
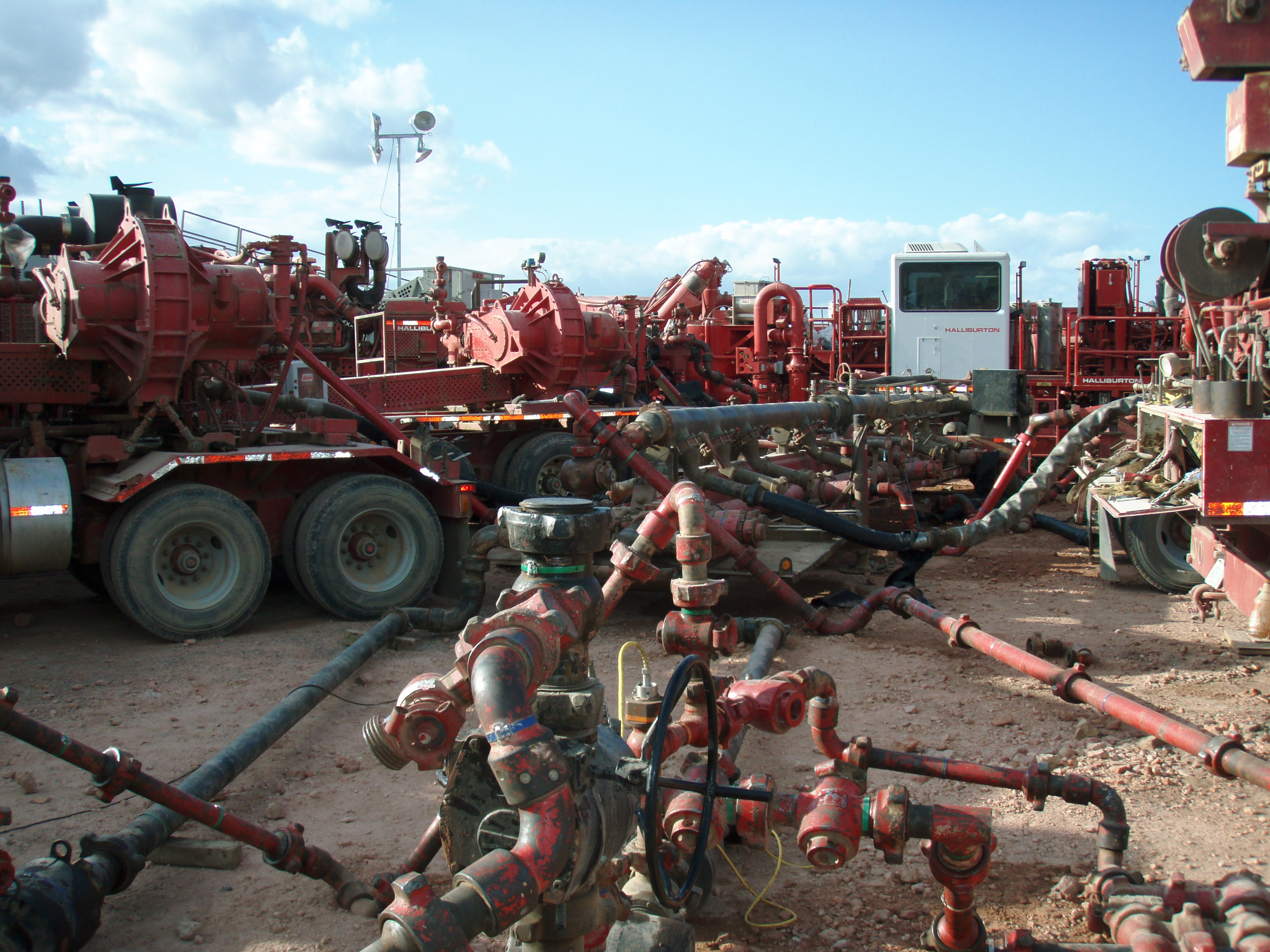
Halliburton fracturing operation in the Bakken Formation, North Dakota, United States

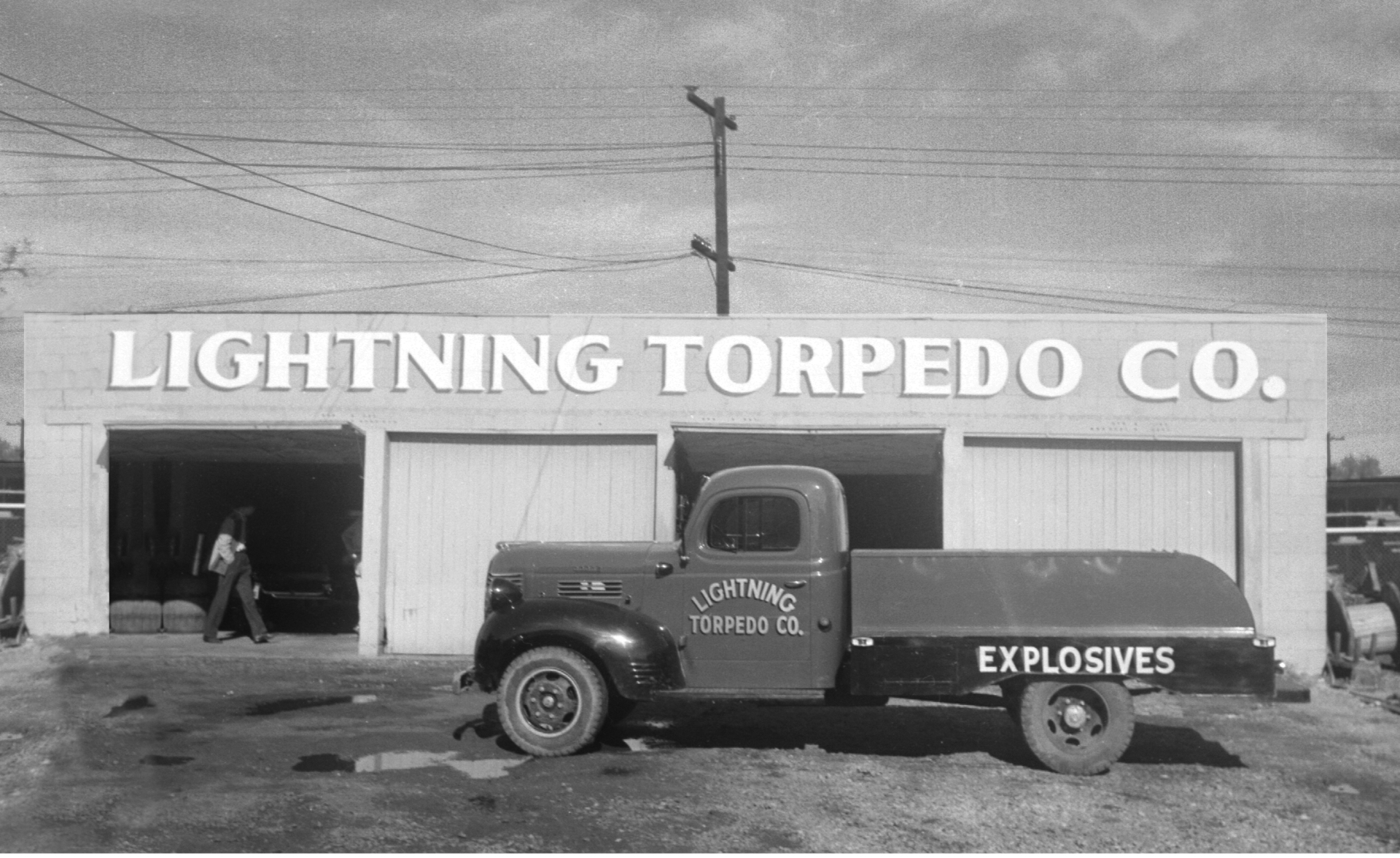
Lightning Torpedo Company

Fracking as a method to stimulate shallow, hard rock oil wells dates back to the 1860s, though the general concept of using water pressure to destroy rock was known as early as ancient Rome, in the form of ruina montium. Dynamite or nitroglycerin detonations were used to increase oil and natural gas production from petroleum bearing formations. On 24 April 1865, US Civil War veteran Col. Edward A. L. Roberts received a patent for an "exploding torpedo". It was employed in Pennsylvania, New York, Kentucky, Oklahoma, Texas, and West Virginia by companies like the Lightning Torpedo Company. It used black powder, liquid nitroglycerin, and, later, solidified nitroglycerin. Later still, the same method was applied to water and gas wells. Stimulation of wells with acid, instead of explosive fluids, was introduced in the 1930s. Due to acid etching, fractures would not close completely, resulting in further productivity increase.

=== 20th century applications ===
Harold Hamm, Aubrey McClendon, Tom Ward and George P. Mitchell are each considered to have pioneered hydraulic fracking innovations toward practical applications.

=== Oil and gas wells ===
The relationship between well performance and treatment pressures was studied by Floyd Farris of Stanolind Oil and Gas Corporation. This study was the basis of the first hydraulic fracturing experiment, conducted by Stanolind in 1947, at the Hugoton gas field in Grant County of southwestern Kansas. For the well treatment, 1,000 US gallons (3,800 L; 830 imp gal) of gelled gasoline (essentially napalm) and sand from the Arkansas River was injected into the gas-producing limestone formation at 2,400 feet (730 m). The initial experiment was not very successful, as the deliverability of the well did not change appreciably. The process was further described by J.B. Clark of Stanolind in his paper published in 1948. A patent on this process was issued in 1949 and an exclusive license was granted to the Halliburton Oil Well Cementing Company. On 17 March 1949, Halliburton performed the first two commercial hydraulic fracking treatments in Stephens County, Oklahoma, and Archer County, Texas. Since then, hydraulic fracking has been used to stimulate approximately one million oil and gas wells in various geologic regimes with good success.

In contrast with large-scale hydraulic fracturing used in low-permeability formations, small hydraulic fracturing treatments are commonly used in high-permeability formations to remedy "skin damage", a low-permeability zone that sometimes forms at the rock-borehole interface. In such cases, the fracturing may extend only a few feet from the borehole.

In the Soviet Union, the first hydraulic proppant fracturing was carried out in 1952. Other countries in Europe and Northern Africa subsequently employed hydraulic fracturing techniques, including Norway, Poland, Czechoslovakia (before 1989), Yugoslavia (before 1991), Hungary, Austria, France, Italy, Bulgaria, Romania, Turkey, Tunisia, and Algeria.

=== Massive fracturing ===
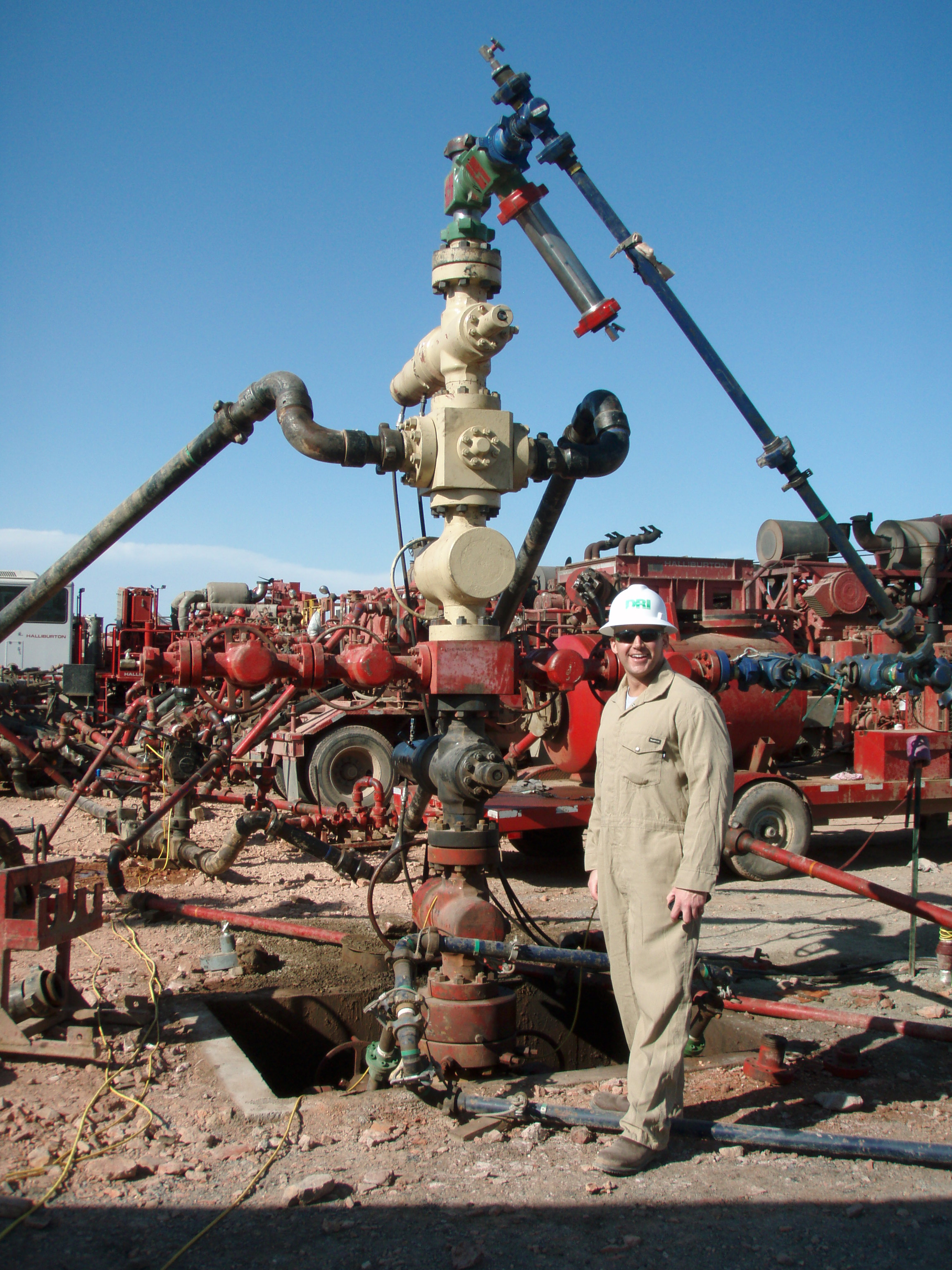
Well head where fluids are injected into the ground

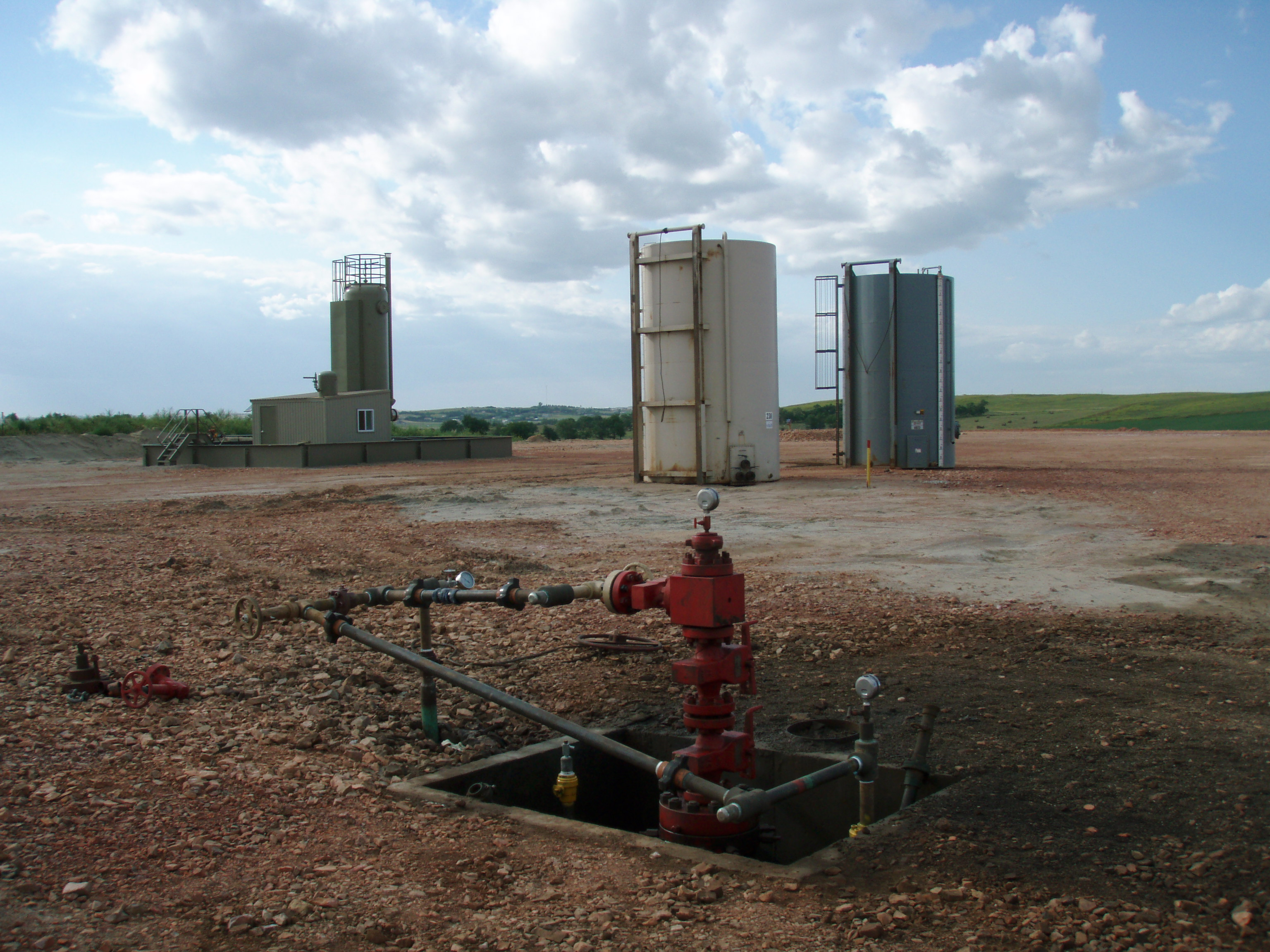
Well head after all the hydraulic fracturing equipment has been taken off location

Massive hydraulic fracturing (also known as high-volume hydraulic fracturing) is a technique first applied by Pan American Petroleum in Stephens County, Oklahoma, US in 1968. The definition of massive hydraulic fracturing varies, but generally refers to treatments injecting over 150 short tons, or approximately 300,000 pounds (136 metric tons), of proppant.

American geologists gradually became aware that there were huge volumes of gas-saturated sandstones with permeability too low (generally less than 0.1 millidarcy) to recover the gas economically. Starting in 1973, massive hydraulic fracturing was used in thousands of gas wells in the San Juan Basin, Denver Basin, the Piceance Basin, and the Green River Basin, as well as other hard rock formations of the western US. Other tight sandstone wells in the US made economically viable by massive hydraulic fracturing were in the Clinton-Medina Sandstone (Ohio, Pennsylvania, and New York), and Cotton Valley Sandstone (Texas and Louisiana).

Massive hydraulic fracturing quickly spread in the late 1970s to western Canada, Rotliegend and Carboniferous gas-bearing sandstones in Germany, the Netherlands, in both onshore and offshore gas fields, and the United Kingdom, in the North Sea.

Horizontal oil or gas wells were unusual until the late 1980s. Then, operators in Texas began completing thousands of oil wells by drilling horizontally in the Austin Chalk, and giving massive slickwater hydraulic fracturing treatments to the wellbores. Horizontal wells proved much more effective than vertical wells in producing oil from tight chalk; sedimentary beds are usually nearly horizontal, so horizontal wells have much larger contact areas with the target formation.

Hydraulic fracturing operations have grown exponentially since the mid-1990s, when technological advances and increases in the price of natural gas made this technique economically viable.

=== Shales ===
Hydraulic fracturing of shales goes back at least to 1965, when some operators in the Big Sandy gas field of eastern Kentucky and southern West Virginia started hydraulically fracturing the Ohio Shale and Cleveland Shale, using relatively small fracs. The frac jobs generally increased production, especially from lower-yielding wells.

In 1976, the United States government started the Eastern Gas Shales Project, which included numerous public-private hydraulic fracturing demonstration projects. During the same period, the Gas Research Institute, a gas industry research consortium, received approval for research and funding from the Federal Energy Regulatory Commission.

In 1997, Nick Steinsberger, an engineer of Mitchell Energy (now part of Devon Energy), applied the slickwater fracturing technique, which used more water and higher pump pressure than previous fracturing techniques and was primarily used in East Texas, in the Barnett Shale of north Texas. In 1998, the new technique proved to be successful when the first 90 days gas production from the well, called S.H. Griffin No. 3, exceeded production of any of the company's previous wells. This new completion technique made gas extraction widely economical in the Barnett Shale, and was later applied to other shales, including the Eagle Ford and Bakken Shale. George P. Mitchell has been called the "father of fracking" because of his role in applying it in shales. The first horizontal well in the Barnett Shale was drilled in 1991, but was not widely used there until it was demonstrated that gas could be economically extracted from vertical wells.

As of 2013, massive hydraulic fracturing is being applied on a commercial scale to shales in the United States, Canada, and China. Several additional countries are planning to use hydraulic fracturing.

== Process ==
As defined by the United States Environmental Protection Agency (EPA), hydraulic fracturing is a process to stimulate a natural gas, oil, or geothermal well to maximize extraction. The EPA defines the broader process to include acquisition of source water, well construction, well stimulation, and waste disposal.

=== Method ===
A hydraulic fracture is formed by pumping fracturing fluid into a wellbore at a rate sufficient to increase pressure at the target depth, determined by the location of the well casing perforations, to exceed that of the fracture gradient (pressure gradient) of the rock. The fracture gradient is defined as pressure increase per unit of depth relative to density, and is usually measured in pounds per square inch, per foot (psi/ft). The rock cracks, and the fracture fluid permeates the rock extending the crack further, and further, and so on. Fractures are localized as pressure drops off with the rate of frictional loss, which is relative to the distance from the well. Operators typically try to maintain "fracture width", or slow its decline following treatment, by introducing a proppant – such as grains of sand, ceramic, or other particulate – into the injected fluid, thus preventing the fractures from closing when injection is stopped and pressure removed. Consideration of proppant strength and prevention of proppant failure becomes more important at greater depths where pressure and stresses on fractures are higher. The propped fracture is permeable enough to allow the flow of gas, oil, salt water and hydraulic fracturing fluids to the well.

During the process, fracturing fluid leakoff, or the loss of fracturing fluid from the fracture channel into the surrounding permeable rock, occurs. If not controlled, it can exceed 70% of the injected volume. This may result in formation matrix damage, adverse formation fluid interaction, and altered fracture geometry, thereby decreasing efficiency.

The location of one or more fractures along the length of the borehole is strictly controlled by various methods that create or seal holes in the side of the wellbore. Hydraulic fracturing is performed in cased wellbores, and the zones to be fractured are accessed by perforating the casing at those locations.

Hydraulic-fracturing equipment used in oil and natural gas fields usually consists of a slurry blender, one or more high-pressure, high-volume fracturing pumps (typically powerful triplex or quintuplex pumps) and a monitoring unit. Associated equipment includes fracturing tanks, one or more units for storage and handling of proppant, high-pressure treating iron, a chemical additive unit (used to accurately monitor chemical addition), fracking hose (low-pressure flexible hoses), and many gauges and meters for flow rate, fluid density, and treating pressure. Chemical additives are typically 0.5% of the total fluid volume. Fracturing equipment operates over a range of pressures and injection rates, and can reach up to 100 megapascals (15,000 psi) and 265 litres per second (9.4 cubic feet per second; 133 US barrels per minute).

=== Well types ===
A distinction can be made between conventional, low-volume hydraulic fracturing, used to stimulate high-permeability reservoirs for a single well, and unconventional, high-volume hydraulic fracturing, used in the completion of tight gas and shale gas wells. High-volume hydraulic fracturing usually requires higher pressures than low-volume fracturing; the higher pressures are needed to push out larger volumes of fluid and proppant that extend farther from the borehole.

Horizontal drilling involves wellbores with a terminal drillhole completed as a "lateral" that extends parallel with the rock layer containing the substance to be extracted. For example, laterals extend 1,500 to 5,000 feet (460 to 1,520 m) in the Barnett Shale basin in Texas, and up to 10,000 feet (3,000 m) in the Bakken formation in North Dakota. In contrast, a vertical well only accesses the thickness of the rock layer, typically 50–300 feet (15–91 m). Horizontal drilling reduces surface disruptions, as fewer wells are required to access the same volume of rock.

Drilling often plugs up the pore spaces at the wellbore wall, reducing permeability at and near the wellbore. This reduces flow into the borehole from the surrounding rock formation, and partially seals off the borehole from the surrounding rock. Low-volume hydraulic fracturing can be used to restore permeability.

=== Fracturing fluids ===
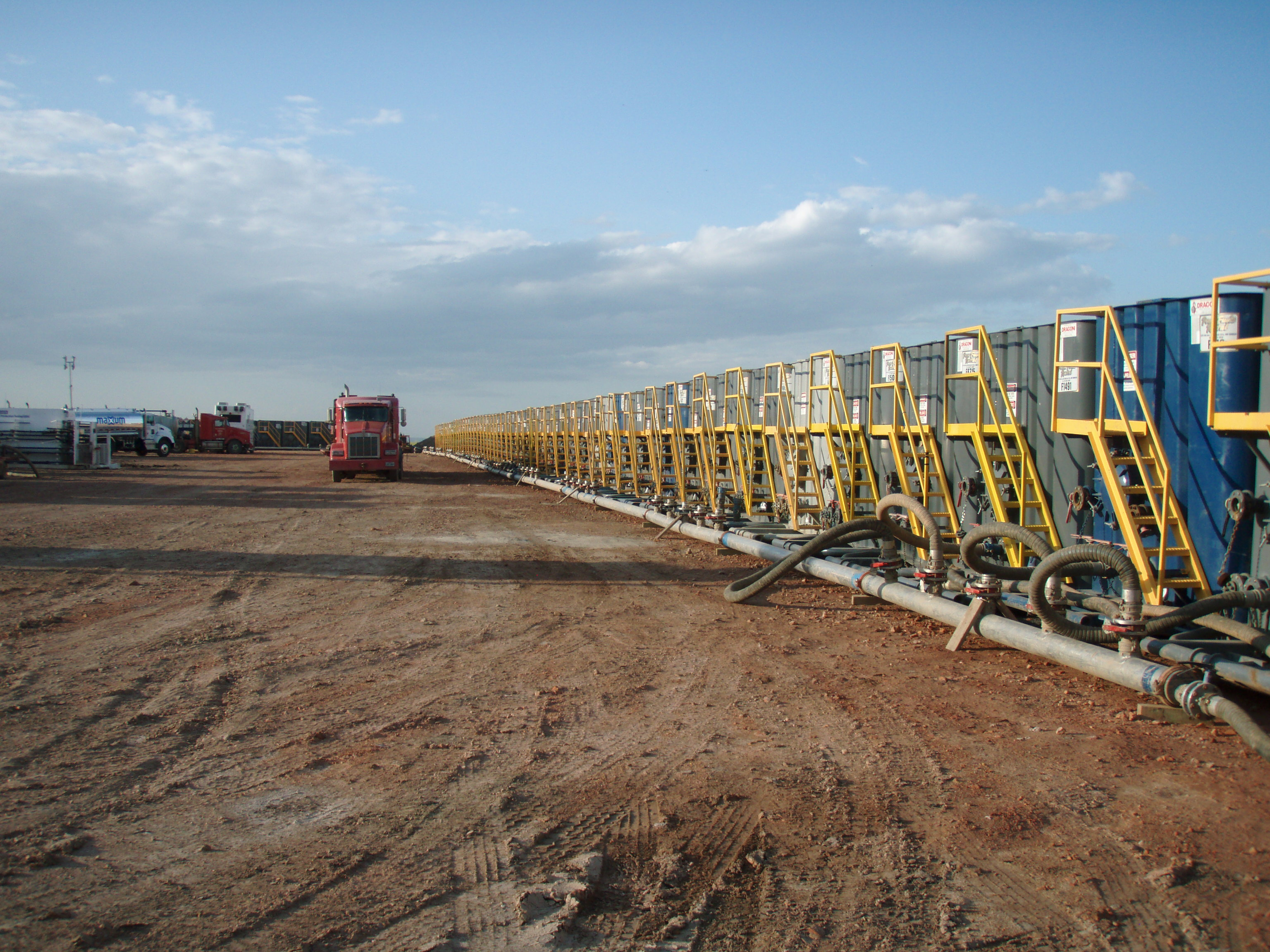
Water tanks preparing for hydraulic fracturing

The main purposes of fracturing fluid are to extend fractures, add lubrication, change gel strength, and carry proppant into the formation. There are two methods of transporting proppant in the fluid – high-rate and high-viscosity. High-viscosity fracturing tends to cause large dominant fractures, while high-rate, or slickwater, fracturing causes small spread-out micro-fractures.

Water-soluble gelling agents, such as guar gum, increase viscosity and efficiently deliver proppant into the formation.

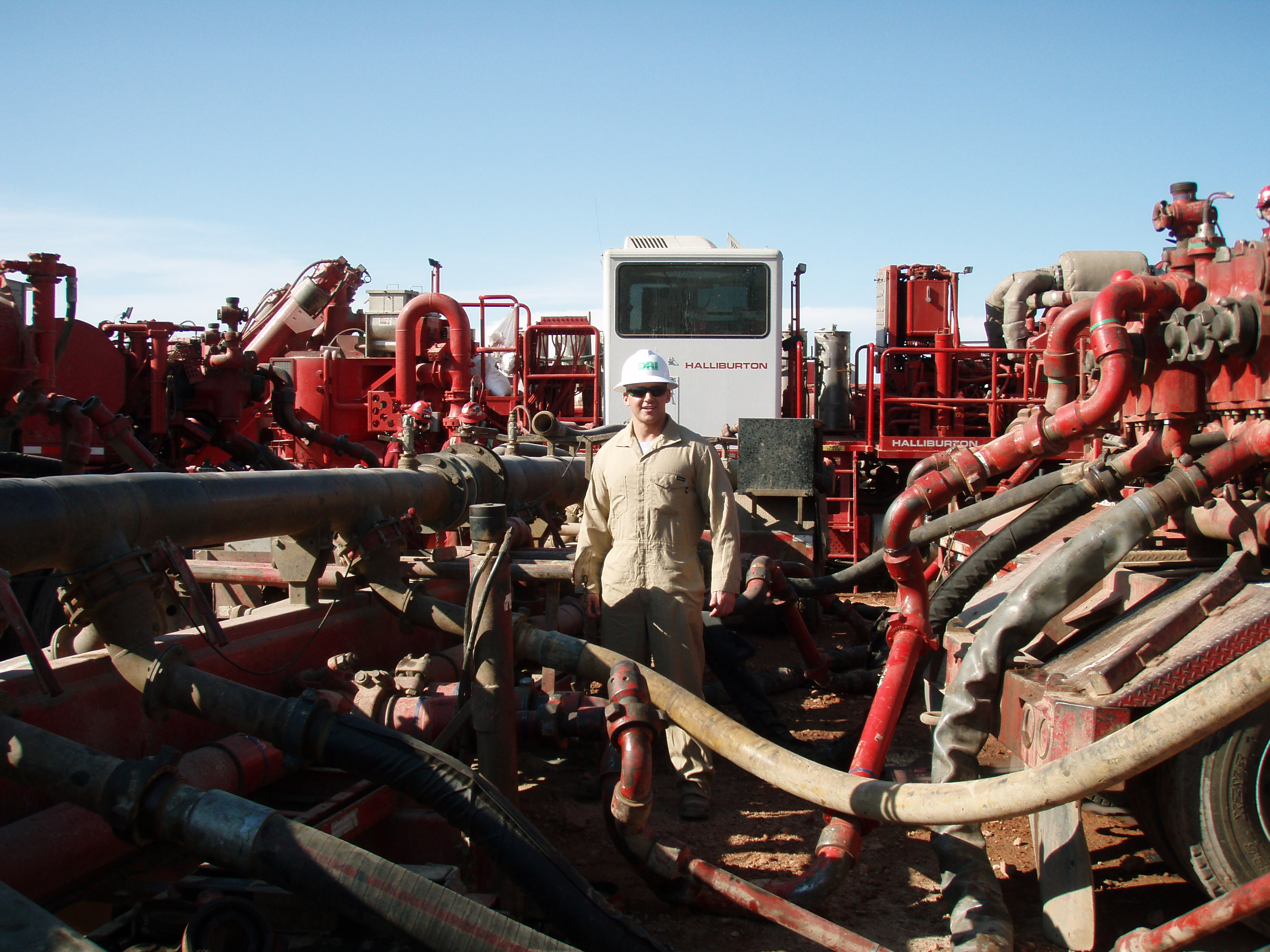
Example of high pressure manifold combining pump flows before injection into well

Fluid is typically a slurry of water, proppant, and chemical additives. Additionally, gels, foams, and compressed gases, including nitrogen, carbon dioxide and air can be injected. Typically, 90% of the fluid is water, 9.5% is sand and about 0.5% is chemical additives. However, fracturing fluids have been developed using liquefied petroleum gas (LPG) and propane. This process is called waterless fracturing.

When propane is used, it is turned into vapor by the high pressure and high temperature. The propane vapor and natural gas both return to the surface and can be collected, making it easier to reuse and/or resale. None of the chemicals used will return to the surface except for the propane.

The proppant is a granular material that prevents the created fractures from closing after the fracturing treatment. Types of proppant include silica sand, resin-coated sand, bauxite, and man-made ceramics. The choice of proppant depends on the type of permeability or grain strength needed. The most commonly used proppant is silica sand, though proppants of uniform size and shape, such as a ceramic proppant, are believed to be more effective. In some formations, where the pressure is great enough to crush grains of natural silica sand, higher-strength proppants such as bauxite or ceramics may be used.

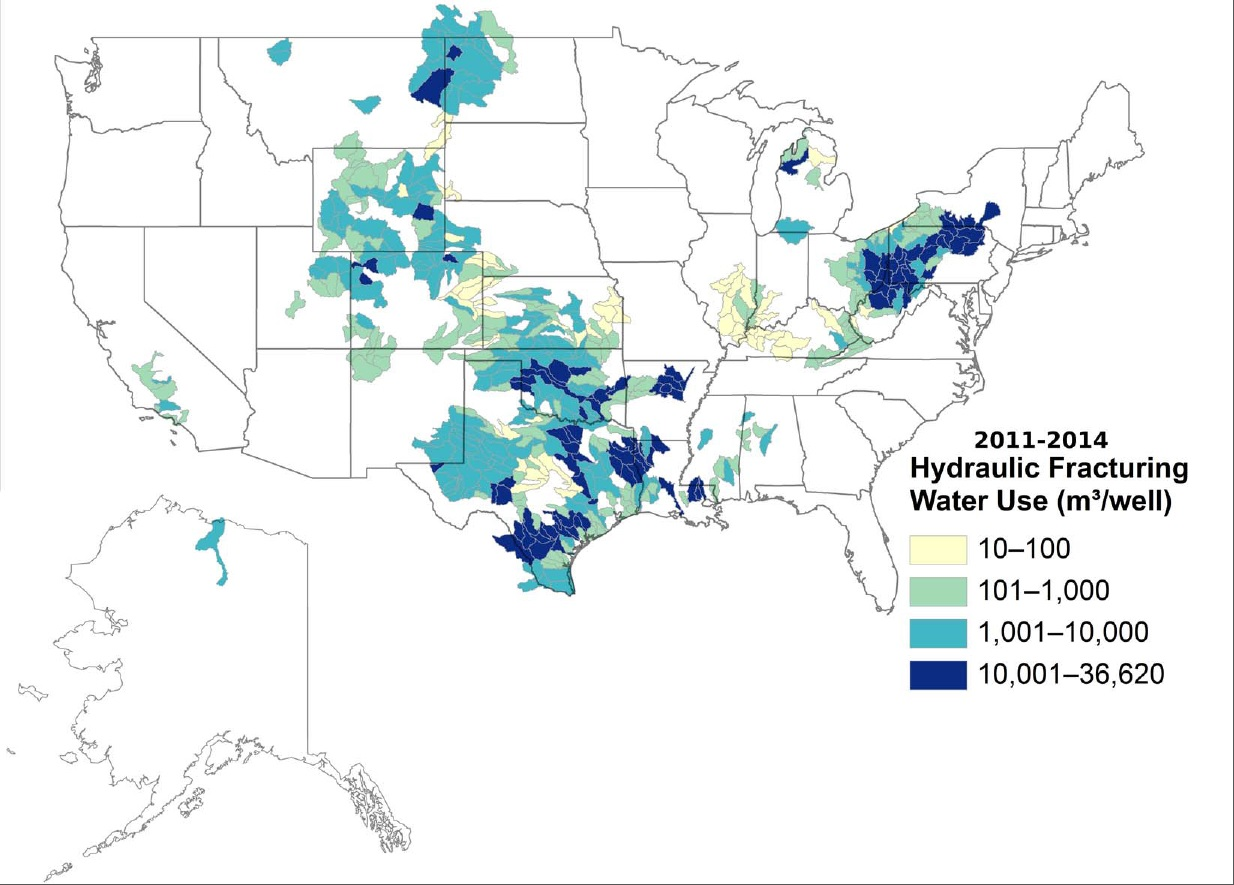
USGS map of water use from hydraulic fracturing between 2011 and 2014. One cubic meter of water is 264.172 gallons.

The fracturing fluid varies depending on fracturing type desired, the conditions of the specific wells being fractured, and water characteristics. The fluid can be gel, foam, or slickwater-based. Fluid choices are tradeoffs: more viscous fluids, such as gels, are better at keeping proppant in suspension; while less-viscous and lower-friction fluids, such as slickwater, allow fluid to be pumped at higher rates and create fractures farther out from the wellbore. Important material properties of the fluid include viscosity, pH, and various rheological factors, among others.

Water is mixed with sand and chemicals to create hydraulic fracturing fluid. Approximately 40,000 US gallons (150,000 L) of chemicals are used per fracturing operation. A typical fracture treatment uses between 3 and 12 additive chemicals. Although there may be unconventional fracturing fluids, typical chemical additives can include one or more of the following:

- Acids—hydrochloric acid or acetic acid is used in the pre-fracturing stage for cleaning the perforations and initiating fissure in the near-wellbore rock.
- Sodium chloride (salt)—delays breakdown of gel polymer chains.
- Polyacrylamide and other friction reducers— decreases turbulence in fluid flow and pipe friction, thus allowing the pumps to pump at a higher rate without having greater pressure on the surface.
- Ethylene glycol—prevents formation of scale deposits in the pipe.
- Borate salts—used for maintaining fluid viscosity during the temperature increase.
- Sodium and potassium carbonates—used for maintaining effectiveness of crosslinkers.
- Glutaraldehyde—a biocide that protects pipe corrosion from microbial activity.
- Guar gum and other water-soluble gelling agents—increases viscosity of the fracturing fluid to deliver proppant into the formation more efficiently.
- Citric acid—used for corrosion prevention.
- Isopropanol—used to winterize the chemicals to ensure they don't freeze.

The most common chemical used for hydraulic fracturing in the United States in 2005–2009 was methanol, while some other most widely used chemicals were isopropyl alcohol, 2-butoxyethanol, and ethylene glycol.

Typical fluid types are:

- Conventional linear gels: either cellulose derivative (carboxymethyl cellulose, hydroxyethyl cellulose, carboxymethyl hydroxyethyl cellulose, hydroxypropyl cellulose, hydroxyethyl methyl cellulose), guar, or its derivatives (hydroxypropyl guar, carboxymethyl hydroxypropyl guar), mixed with other chemicals.
- Borate-crosslinked fluids: guar-based fluids cross-linked with boron ions (from aqueous borax/boric acid solution). These gels have higher viscosity at pH 9 onwards and are used to carry proppant. After the fracturing job, the pH is reduced to 3–4 so that the cross-links are broken, the gel is made less viscous and can be pumped out.
- Organometallic-crosslinked fluids, such as zirconium, chromium, antimony, titanium salts: known to crosslink guar-based gels. The crosslinking mechanism is not reversible, so once the proppant is pumped down along with cross-linked gel, the fracturing part is done. The gels are broken down with appropriate breakers.
- Aluminium phosphate-ester oil gel: slurried to form cross-linked gel. These are one of the first known gelling systems.

For slickwater fluids, the use of sweeps is common. Sweeps are temporary reductions in the proppant concentration, which help ensure that the well is not overwhelmed with proppant. As the fracturing process proceeds, viscosity-reducing agents such as oxidizers and enzyme breakers are sometimes added to the fracturing fluid to deactivate the gelling agents and encourage flowback. Such oxidizers react with and break down the gel, reducing the fluid's viscosity and ensuring that no proppant is pulled from the formation. An enzyme acts as a catalyst for breaking down the gel. Sometimes, pH modifiers are used to break down the crosslink at the end of a hydraulic fracturing job, since many require a pH buffer system to stay viscous. At the end of the job, the well is commonly flushed with water under pressure, sometimes blended with a friction reducing chemical. Some (but not all) injected fluid is recovered. This fluid is managed by several methods, including underground injection control, treatment, discharge, recycling, and temporary storage in pits or containers. New technology is continually developing to better handle waste water and improve re-usability.

=== Fracture monitoring ===
Measurements of the pressure and rate during the growth of a hydraulic fracture, with knowledge of fluid properties and proppant being injected into the well, provides the most common and simplest method of monitoring a hydraulic fracture treatment. This data, along with knowledge of the underground geology, can be used to model information such as length, width and conductivity of a propped fracture.

==== Radionuclide monitoring ====
Injection of radioactive tracers along with the fracturing fluid is sometimes used to determine the injection profile and location of created fractures. Radiotracers are selected to have readily detectable radiation, appropriate chemical properties, and a half-life and toxicity level that will minimize initial and residual contamination. Radioactive isotopes chemically bonded to glass (sand) and/or resin beads may also be injected to track fractures. For example, plastic pellets coated with 10 GBq of Ag-110mm may be added to the proppant, or sand may be labelled with Ir-192, so that the proppant's progress can be monitored. Radiotracers such as Tc-99m and I-131 are also used to measure flow rates. The Nuclear Regulatory Commission publishes guidelines which list a wide range of radioactive materials, in solid, liquid and gaseous forms, that may be used as tracers, and limit the amount of each radionuclide that may be used per injection and per well.

A new technique in well-monitoring involves fiber-optic cables outside the casing. Using the fiber optics, temperatures can be measured every foot along the well – even while the wells are being fracked and pumped. By monitoring the temperature of the well, engineers can determine how much hydraulic fracturing fluid different parts of the well use as well as how much natural gas or oil they collect, during hydraulic fracturing operation and when the well is producing.

==== Microseismic monitoring ====
For more advanced applications, microseismic monitoring is sometimes used to estimate the size and orientation of induced fractures. Microseismic activity is measured by placing an array of geophones in a nearby wellbore. By mapping the location of any small seismic events associated with the growing fracture, the approximate geometry of the fracture is inferred. Tiltmeter arrays deployed on the surface or down a well provide another technology for monitoring strain.

Microseismic mapping is very similar geophysically to seismology. In earthquake seismology, seismometers scattered on or near the surface of the earth record S-waves and P-waves that are released during an earthquake event. This allows for motion along the fault plane to be estimated and its location in the Earth's subsurface mapped. Hydraulic fracturing can lead to an increase in formation stress proportional to the net fracturing pressure, as well as an increase in pore pressure due to leakoff. Tensile stresses are generated ahead of the fracture's tip, generating large amounts of shear stress. The increases in pore water pressure and formation stress combine and affect weaknesses near the hydraulic fracture, like natural fractures, joints, and bedding planes.

Different methods have different location errors and advantages. Accuracy of microseismic event mapping is dependent on the signal-to-noise ratio and the distribution of sensors. Accuracy of events located by seismic inversion is improved by sensors placed in multiple azimuths from the monitored borehole. In a downhole array location, accuracy of events is improved by being close to the monitored borehole (high signal-to-noise ratio).

Monitoring of microseismic events induced by reservoir stimulation has become a key aspect in evaluation of hydraulic fractures, and their optimization. The main goal of hydraulic fracture monitoring is to completely characterize the induced fracture structure, and distribution of conductivity within a formation. Geomechanical analysis, such as understanding a formation's material properties, in-situ conditions, and geometries, helps monitoring by providing a better definition of the environment in which the fracture network propagates. Another key piece of information is the location of proppant within the fracture and the distribution of fracture conductivity. This can be monitored, using multiple types of techniques, to develop a reservoir model that accurately predicts well performance.

=== Horizontal completions ===
Since the early 2000s, advances in drilling and completion technology have made horizontal wellbores much more economical. Horizontal wellbores allow far greater exposure to a formation than conventional vertical wellbores. This is particularly useful in shale formations which do not have sufficient permeability to produce economically with a vertical well. Such wells, when drilled onshore, are now usually hydraulically fractured in a number of stages, especially in North America. The type of wellbore completion is used to determine how many times a formation is fractured, and at what locations along the horizontal section.

In North America, shale reservoirs such as the Bakken, Barnett, Montney, Haynesville, Marcellus, and, most recently, the Eagle Ford, Niobrara and Utica shales are drilled horizontally through the producing intervals, completed and fractured. There are two main methods by which the fractures are placed along the wellbore, known as "plug and perf" and "sliding sleeve".

The wellbore for a plug-and-perf job is generally composed of standard steel casing, cemented or uncemented, and set in the drilled hole. Once the drilling rig has been removed, a wireline truck is used to perforate near the bottom of the well, and then fracturing fluid is pumped. Then, the wireline truck sets a plug in the well to temporarily seal off that section so the next section of the wellbore can be treated. Another stage is pumped, and the process is repeated along the horizontal length of the wellbore.

The wellbore for the sliding sleeve technique is different, in that the sliding sleeves are included at set spacings in the steel casing at the time it is set in place. The sliding sleeves are usually all closed at this time. When the well is due to be fractured, the bottom sliding sleeve is opened using one of several activation techniques and the first stage gets pumped. Once finished, the next sleeve is opened, concurrently isolating the previous stage, and the process repeats. For the sliding sleeve method, wireline is usually not required.

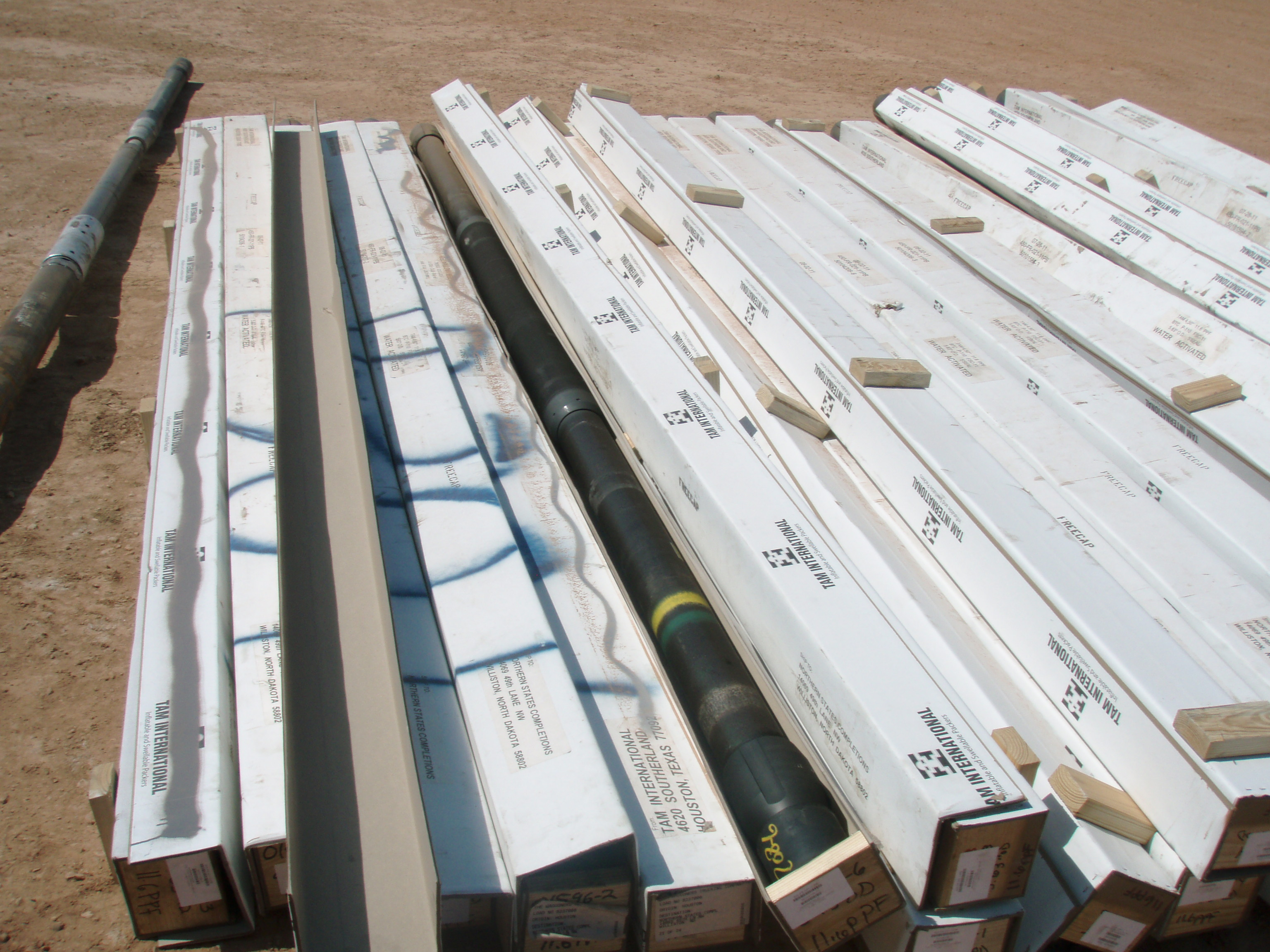
Sleeves

These completion techniques may allow for more than 30 stages to be pumped into the horizontal section of a single well if required, which is far more than would typically be pumped into a vertical well that had far fewer feet of producing zone exposed.

== Uses ==
Hydraulic fracturing is used to increase the rate at which substances, such as petroleum or natural gas, can be recovered from subterranean natural reservoirs. Reservoirs are typically porous sandstones, limestones or dolomite rocks, but also include "unconventional reservoirs" such as shale rock or coal beds. Hydraulic fracturing enables the extraction of natural gas and oil from rock formations deep below the earth's surface (generally 2,000–6,000 m (5,000–20,000 ft)), far below typical groundwater reservoir levels. At such depth, there may be insufficient permeability or reservoir pressure to allow natural gas and oil to flow from the rock into the wellbore at high economic return. Thus, creating conductive fractures in the rock is instrumental in extraction from naturally impermeable shale reservoirs. Permeability is measured in the microdarcy to nanodarcy range. Fractures are a conductive path connecting a larger volume of reservoir to the well. So-called "super fracking" creates cracks deeper in the rock formation to release more oil and gas, and increases efficiency. The yield for typical shale bores generally falls off after the first year or two, but the peak producing life of a well can be extended to several decades.

=== Non-oil/gas uses ===
While the main industrial use of hydraulic fracturing is in stimulating production from oil and gas wells, hydraulic fracturing is also used:

- To stimulate groundwater wells
- To precondition or induce rock cave-ins in mining
- To enhance waste remediation, usually hydrocarbon waste or spills
- To dispose of waste by injection deep into rock
- To measure stress in the Earth
- For electricity generation in enhanced geothermal systems
- To increase injection rates for geologic sequestration of CO_{2}
- To store electrical energy in pumped storage hydroelectricity

Since the late 1970s, hydraulic fracturing has been used, in some cases, to increase the yield of drinking water from wells in a number of countries, including the United States, Australia, and South Africa.

== Economic effects ==
Hydraulic fracturing has been seen as one of the key methods of extracting unconventional oil and unconventional gas resources. According to the International Energy Agency, the remaining technically recoverable resources are estimated at 208 trillion cubic metres (7,300 trillion cubic feet) of shale gas, 76 trillion cubic metres (2,700 trillion cubic feet) of tight gas, and 47 trillion cubic metres (1,700 trillion cubic feet) of coalbed methane. As a rule, formations of these resources have lower permeability than conventional gas formations. Therefore, depending on the geological characteristics of the formation, specific technologies such as hydraulic fracturing are required. Although there are also other methods to extract these resources, such as conventional drilling or horizontal drilling, hydraulic fracturing may be more economically viable. The multi-stage fracturing technique has facilitated the development of shale gas and light tight oil production in the United States and is believed to do so in the other countries with unconventional hydrocarbon resources.

A large majority of studies indicate that hydraulic fracturing in the United States has had a strong positive economic benefit so far. The Brookings Institution estimates that the benefits of shale gas alone has led to a net economic benefit of $48 billion per year. Most of this benefit is within the consumer and industrial sectors, due to the significantly reduced prices for natural gas. Other studies have suggested that the economic benefits are outweighed by the externalities and that the levelized cost of electricity (LCOE) from less carbon- and water-intensive sources is lower.

The primary benefit of hydraulic fracturing is that it offsets imports of natural gas and oil, where the cost paid to producers otherwise exits the domestic economy. However, shale oil and gas is highly subsidised in the US, and has not yet covered production costs – meaning that the cost of hydraulic fracturing is paid for in income taxes, and, in many cases, is up to double the cost paid at the pump.

Research suggests that hydraulic fracturing wells have an adverse effect on agricultural productivity in the vicinity of the wells. One paper found "that productivity of an irrigated crop decreases by 5.7% when a well is drilled during the agriculturally active months within 11–20 km radius of a producing township. This effect becomes smaller and weaker as the distance between township and wells increases." The findings imply that the introduction of hydraulic fracturing wells to Alberta cost the province $14.8 million in 2014, due to the decline in the crop productivity,

The Energy Information Administration of the US Department of Energy estimates that 45% of US gas supply will come from shale gas by 2035, with the vast majority of this replacing conventional gas, which has a lower greenhouse-gas footprint.

== Public debate ==
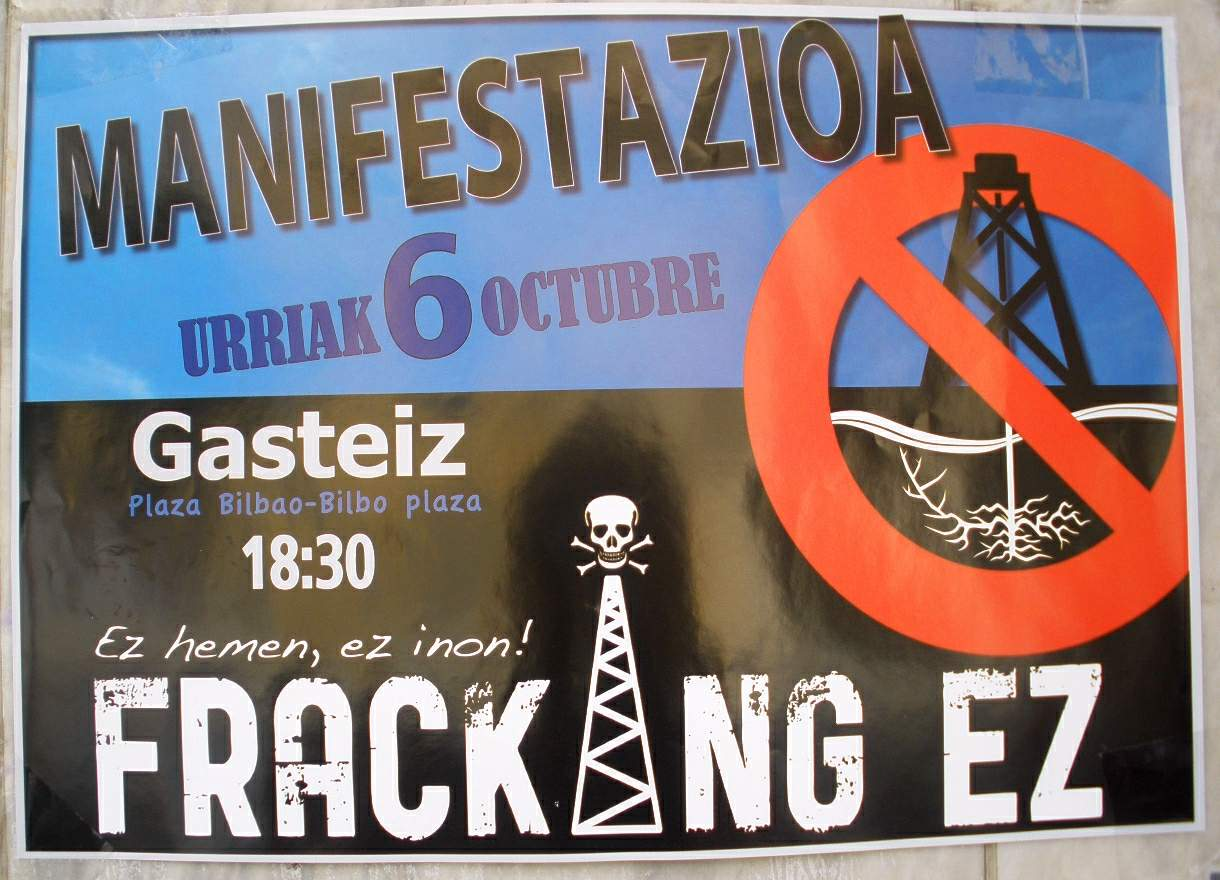
Poster in Basque against hydraulic fracturing in Vitoria-Gasteiz (Basque Country, Spain, 2012)

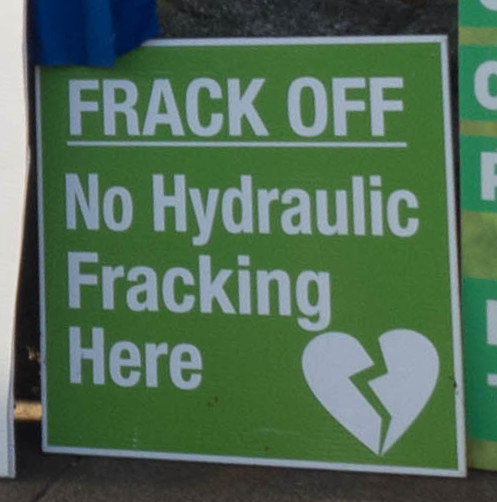
Placard against hydraulic fracturing at Extinction Rebellion (2018)

=== Politics and public policy ===
==== Popular movement and civil society organizations ====
An anti-fracking movement has emerged both internationally, with involvement of international environmental organizations and nations such as France, and locally, in affected areas such as Balcombe in Sussex, where the Balcombe drilling protest took place during mid-2013. The considerable opposition against hydraulic fracturing activities in local townships in the United States has led companies to adopt a variety of public relations measures to reassure the public, including the employment of former military personnel with training in psychological warfare operations. According to Matt Pitzarella, the communications director at Range Resources, employees trained in the Middle East have been valuable to Range Resources in Pennsylvania, when dealing with emotionally charged township meetings and advising townships on zoning and local ordinances dealing with hydraulic fracturing.

There have been many protests directed at hydraulic fracturing. For example, ten people were arrested in 2013 during an anti-fracking protest near New Matamoras, Ohio, after they illegally entered a development zone and latched themselves to drilling equipment. In northwest Pennsylvania, there was a drive-by shooting at a well site, in which someone shot two rounds of a small-caliber rifle in the direction of a drilling rig. In Washington County, Pennsylvania, a contractor working on a gas pipeline found a pipe bomb that had been placed where a pipeline was to be constructed, which local authorities said would have caused a "catastrophe" had they not discovered and detonated it.

==== U.S. government and corporate lobbying ====
The United States Department of State established the Global Shale Gas Initiative to persuade governments around the world to allow the major oil and gas companies to set up fracking operations. A document from the United States diplomatic cables leak shows that, as part of this project, U.S. officials convened conferences for foreign government officials that featured presentations by major oil and gas company representatives, as well as advice from public relations professionals on how to assuage populations of target countries whose citizens were often quite hostile to fracking on their lands. The US government project succeeded, as many countries on several continents acceded to the idea of granting concessions for fracking; Poland, for example, agreed to permit fracking by the major oil and gas corporations on nearly a third of its territory. The US Export-Import Bank, an agency of the US government, provided $4.7 billion in financing for fracking operations set up since 2010 in Queensland, Australia.

==== Alleged Russian state advocacy ====
In 2014, a number of European officials suggested that several major European protests against hydraulic fracturing, which met with mixed success in Lithuania and Ukraine, may have been partially sponsored by Gazprom, Russia's state-controlled gas company. The New York Times suggested that Russia saw its natural gas exports to Europe as a key element of its geopolitical influence, and that this market would diminish if hydraulic fracturing was adopted in Eastern Europe, as it would open up significant shale gas reserves in the region. Russian officials have, on numerous occasions, made public statements implying that hydraulic fracturing "poses a huge environmental problem".

==== Current fracking operations ====
Hydraulic fracturing is currently taking place in the United States in Arkansas, California, Colorado, Louisiana, North Dakota, Oklahoma, Pennsylvania, Texas, Virginia, West Virginia, and Wyoming. As of 2024, there are currently seven major fracking operations active in the United States. These are the Bakken operation in North Dakota and Montana, Niobrara operation in Wyoming and Colorado, Anandarko in Northern Texas and Oklahoma, Permian and Eagle Ford in Texas, Haynesville in Texas and Louisiana, and the large Appalachia site. California has had a longtime moratorium on fracking and Vermont, New York, Maryland, Washington, and Oregon all have statewide fracking bans.

Although a hydraulic fracturing moratorium was recently lifted in the United Kingdom, the government is proceeding cautiously because of concerns about earthquakes and the environmental effect of drilling. Hydraulic fracturing is currently banned in France and Bulgaria.

=== Documentary films ===
Josh Fox's 2010 Academy Award nominated film Gasland became a center of opposition to hydraulic fracturing of shale. The movie presented problems with groundwater contamination near well sites in Pennsylvania, Wyoming and Colorado. Energy in Depth, an oil and gas industry lobbying group, called the film's facts into question. In response, a rebuttal of Energy in Depth's claims of inaccuracy was posted on Gasland's website. The Director of the Colorado Oil and Gas Conservation Commission (COGCC) offered to be interviewed as part of the film, if he could review what was included from the interview in the final film but Fox declined the offer. ExxonMobil, Chevron Corporation and ConocoPhillips aired advertisements during 2011 and 2012 that claimed to describe the economic and environmental benefits of natural gas and argued that hydraulic fracturing was safe.

The 2012 film Promised Land, starring Matt Damon, takes on hydraulic fracturing. The gas industry countered the film's criticisms of hydraulic fracturing with flyers, and Twitter and Facebook posts.

In January 2013, Northern Irish journalist and filmmaker Phelim McAleer released a crowdfunded documentary called FrackNation as a response to the statements made by Fox in Gasland, claiming it "tells the truth about fracking for natural gas". FrackNation premiered on Mark Cuban's AXS TV. The premiere corresponded with the release of Promised Land.

In April 2013, Josh Fox released Gasland 2, his "international odyssey uncovering a trail of secrets, lies and contamination related to hydraulic fracking". It challenges the gas industry's portrayal of natural gas as a clean and safe alternative to oil, and argues that hydraulically fractured wells inevitably leak over time, contaminating water and air, hurting families, and endangering the Earth's climate with the potent greenhouse gas methane.

In 2014, Scott Cannon of Video Innovations released the documentary The Ethics of Fracking. The film covers political, spiritual, scientific, medical and professional points of view on hydraulic fracturing. It also digs into the way the gas industry portrays hydraulic fracturing in their advertising.

In 2015, the Canadian documentary film Fractured Land had its world premiere at the Hot Docs Canadian International Documentary Festival.

=== Research issues ===
Research into fracking may also be controversial. Typically, the funding source of the research studies is the focal point of the controversy. Concerns have been raised about research funded by foundations and corporations, or by environmental groups, which can, at times, lead to the research appearing unreliable. Several organizations, researchers, and media outlets have reported difficulty in conducting and reporting the results of studies on hydraulic fracturing due to industry and governmental pressure, and expressed concern over possible censoring of environmental reports. Some have argued there is a need for more research into the environmental and health effects of the technique.

== Health risks ==
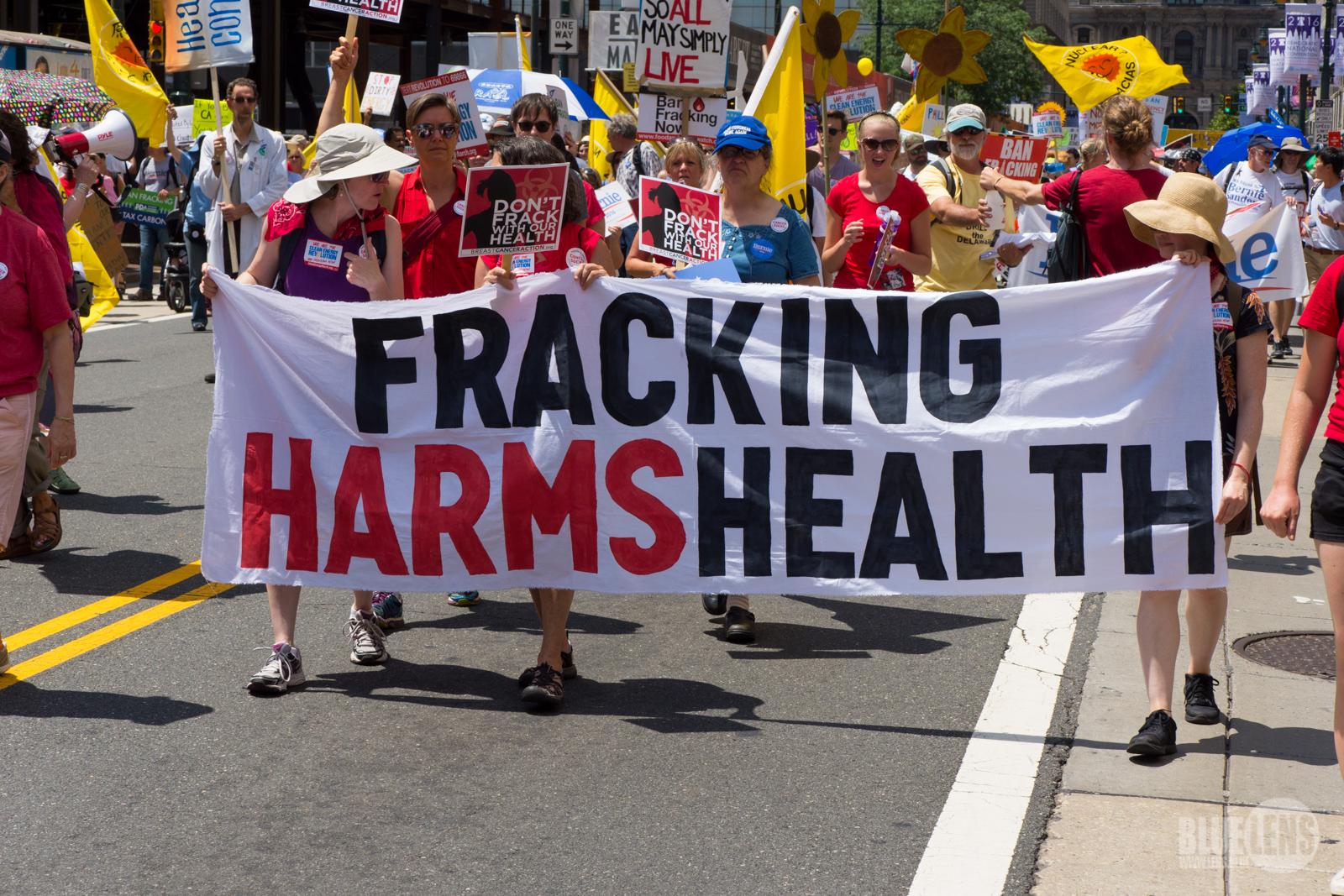
Anti-fracking banner at the Clean Energy March (Philadelphia, 2016)

There is concern over the possible adverse public health implications of hydraulic fracturing activity. A 2013 review on shale gas production in the United States stated, "with increasing numbers of drilling sites, more people are at risk from accidents and exposure to harmful substances used at fractured wells." A 2011 hazard assessment recommended full disclosure of chemicals used for hydraulic fracturing and drilling, as many definitely have immediate health effects and may have long-term health effects.

Guidance for pediatric nurses in the US, published in 2012, said that hydraulic fracturing had a potential negative impact on public health and that pediatric nurses should be prepared to gather information on such topics so as to advocate for improved community health. A 2012 report, prepared for the European Union Directorate-General for the Environment, identified potential risks to humans from air pollution and ground water contamination posed by hydraulic fracturing. This led to a series of recommendations in 2014 to mitigate these concerns.

In June 2014, Public Health England published a review of the potential public health impacts of exposures to chemical and radioactive pollutants as a result of shale gas extraction in the UK, based on the examination of literature and data from countries where hydraulic fracturing already occurs. The executive summary of the report stated:

An assessment of the currently available evidence indicates that the potential risks to public health from exposure to the emissions associated with shale gas extraction will be low if the operations are properly run and regulated. Most evidence suggests that contamination of groundwater, if it occurs, is most likely to be caused by leakage through the vertical borehole. Contamination of groundwater from the underground hydraulic fracturing process itself (i.e. the fracturing of the shale) is unlikely. However, surface spills of hydraulic fracturing fluids or wastewater may affect groundwater, and emissions to air also have the potential to impact on health. Where potential risks have been identified in the literature, the reported problems are typically a result of operational failure and a poor regulatory environment.

— p. iii

A 2017 study in The American Economic Review found that "additional well pads drilled within 1 kilometer of a community water system intake increases shale gas-related contaminants in drinking water."

A 2022 study, conducted by the Harvard T.H. Chan School of Public Health and published in Nature Energy, found that elderly people living near or downwind of unconventional oil and gas development (UOGD)—which involves extraction methods including fracking—are at greater risk of experiencing early death compared with elderly persons who don't live near such operations.

Statistics collected by the U.S. Department of Labor and analyzed by the U.S. Centers for Disease Control and Prevention show a correlation between drilling activity and the number of occupational injuries related to drilling and motor vehicle accidents, explosions, falls, and fires. Extraction workers are also at risk for developing pulmonary diseases, including lung cancer and silicosis, the latter due to exposure to silica dust generated from rock drilling and the handling of sand. The U.S. National Institute for Occupational Safety and Health (NIOSH) also identified exposure to airborne silica as a health hazard to workers conducting some hydraulic fracturing operations. NIOSH and OSHA issued a joint hazard alert on this topic in June 2012.

Additionally, the extraction workforce is at increased risk for radiation exposure. Fracking activities often require drilling into rock that contains naturally occurring radioactive material (NORM), such as radon, thorium, and uranium.

Another report, carried out by the Canadian Medical Journal, reported that they identified 55 factors that may cause cancer, including 20 that have been shown to increase the risk of leukemia and lymphoma. The Yale Public Health analysis warns that millions of people living within a mile of fracking wells may have been exposed to these chemicals.

Despite these health concerns and efforts to institute a moratorium on fracking until its environmental and health effects are better understood, the United States continues to rely heavily on fossil fuel energy. In 2017, 37% of annual U.S. energy consumption was derived from petroleum, 29% from natural gas, 14% from coal, and 9% from nuclear sources, with only 11% supplied by renewable energy, such as wind and solar power.

== Environmental justice ==
Fracking is associated many different environmental justice issues. One of the main issues is the effect the wells have on the communities they are placed in. A majority of the fracking sites in the United States are located in poor, rural areas. This results in the poor, people of color, and native peoples being disproportionately affected by the negative externalities of fracking operations.

Many fracking companies claim their sites will result in more job opportunities for the communities they are located in. However, Sean O'Leary, a senior researcher at Ohio River Valley Institute and author of a report on Ohio fracking sites, pointed out that "completed wells don't need many permanent employees. And many people who work in drilling and fracking come outside the local area." This becomes an issue because many of these fracking sites are built in poor, rural communities, where people need employment. There have been many cases where there has been an observed decline in employment following fracking implementation. Since the Appalachian fracking boom in 2008, thirty large gas companies in Ohio, Pennsylvania, and West Virginia have logged a large economic output. However, between 2008 and 2025, job opportunities in the area fell by 1% while, nationally, they rose 14%; employment grew 4% in the fracking regions while the nation employment rate grew by 10%; and income grew three quarters the rate of the national average. According to Sean O'Leary, "while some studies have found that economic conditions improve in areas where fracking is introduced, these studies fail to negate the fact that the negative externalities from fracking are centralized in these regions (poor rural regions) and that they often burden those who do not receive economic benefits from fracking." Though many regions are promised economic benefits, typically in poor rural areas where this is needed, these benefits never come to fruition. One such case occurred in North Jackson, Ohio, where a local, Mel Cadle, allowed the construction of wells on his farm with the promise of lucrative royalties. However, Cadle stated, "I don't have any income from these wells. I lost five acres for nothing"; the oil companies made false promises and didn't provide him any sort of financial compensation for the use of his land.

Native peoples also face a disproportionate amount of fracking in their communities, as companies and the government often take their land and destroy it for mineral resources such as gas and oil. According to the Classic Journal, legislation has been created in the United States to explicitly allow this to occur. This includes federal acts, such as the Mineral Leasing Act of 1938 and the Indian Self- Determination and Education Assistance Act of 1975, which both restrict Native peoples' rights to resources on their lands. A major issue associated with fracking that oftentimes affects Native Tribes is chemical filled wastewater from fracking sites. A study, conducted by Shelley Palmer and other University of Georgia faculty members and exploring the negative impacts of fracking policies on Native American lands and communities, states that "regulatory loopholes allow untreated wastewater from fracking to be disposed of onto Native American lands, resulting in pollution issues and human health hazards".

Some of the major environmental and health effects of fracking result in rural communities, where the wells are located, being disproportionately affected by water contamination, air contamination, and land contamination. Research conducted by law scholar Matthew Castell found that neither federal status nor common law provide affected communities and landowners with access to solutions or help for harms caused by fracking. Research by Vivian Underhill found that from 2014 through 2024, 62% to 73% of reported fracks each year used at least one chemical that the Safe Drinking Water Act recognizes as detrimental to human health and the environment.They note that if not for the Halliburton Loophole, these projects would have been subject to permitting and monitoring requirements, providing information for local communities about potential risks.

== Environmental impacts ==
Environmental Effects of Hydraulic Fracturing
- Schematic depiction of hydraulic fracturing for shale gas
- Process type: Mechanical
- Industrial sector(s): Mining
- Main technologies or sub-processes: Fluid pressure
- Product(s): Natural gas, petroleum
- Inventor: Floyd Farris, Joseph B. Clark (Stanolind Oil and Gas Corporation)
- Year of invention: 1947

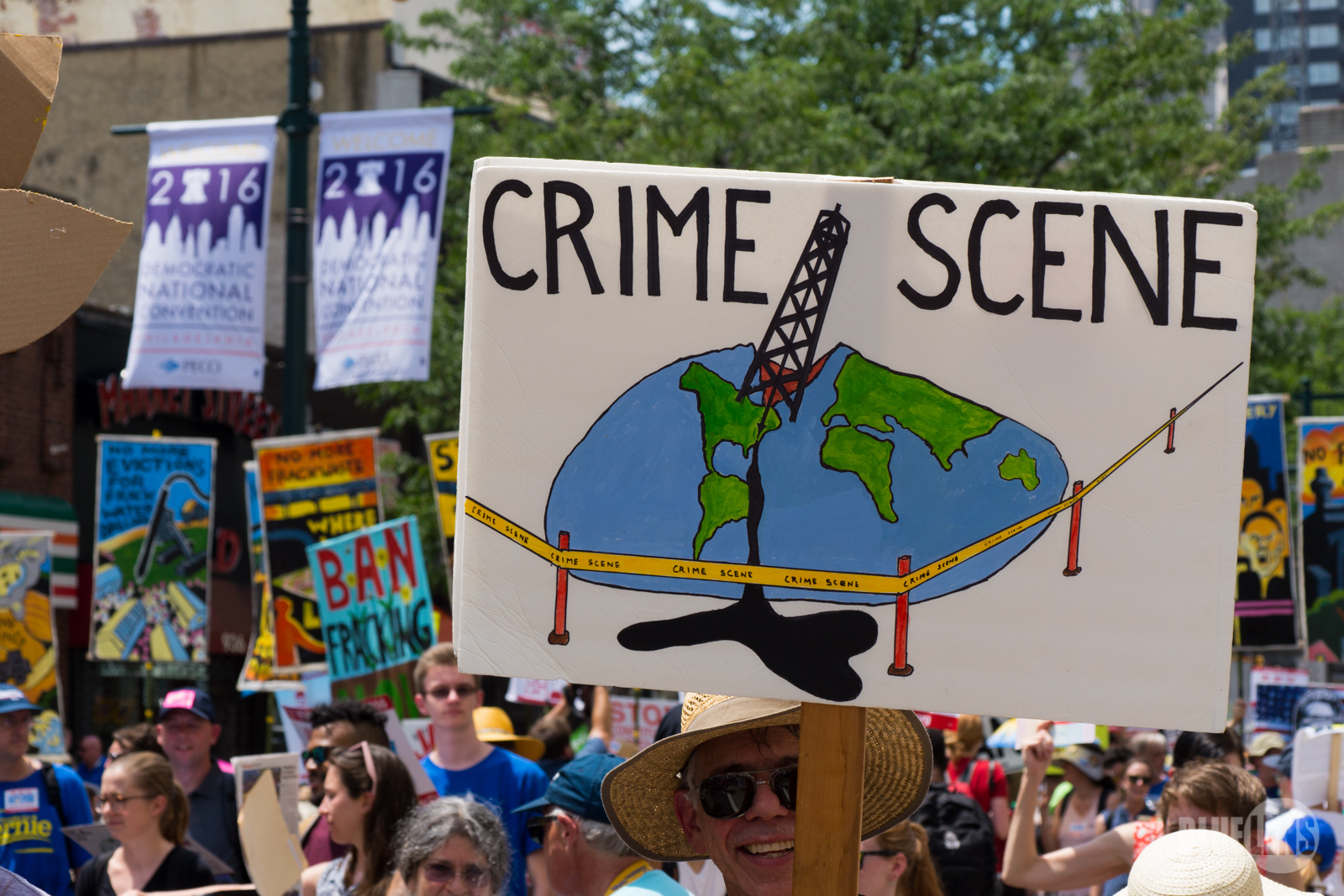
Clean Energy March in Philadelphia

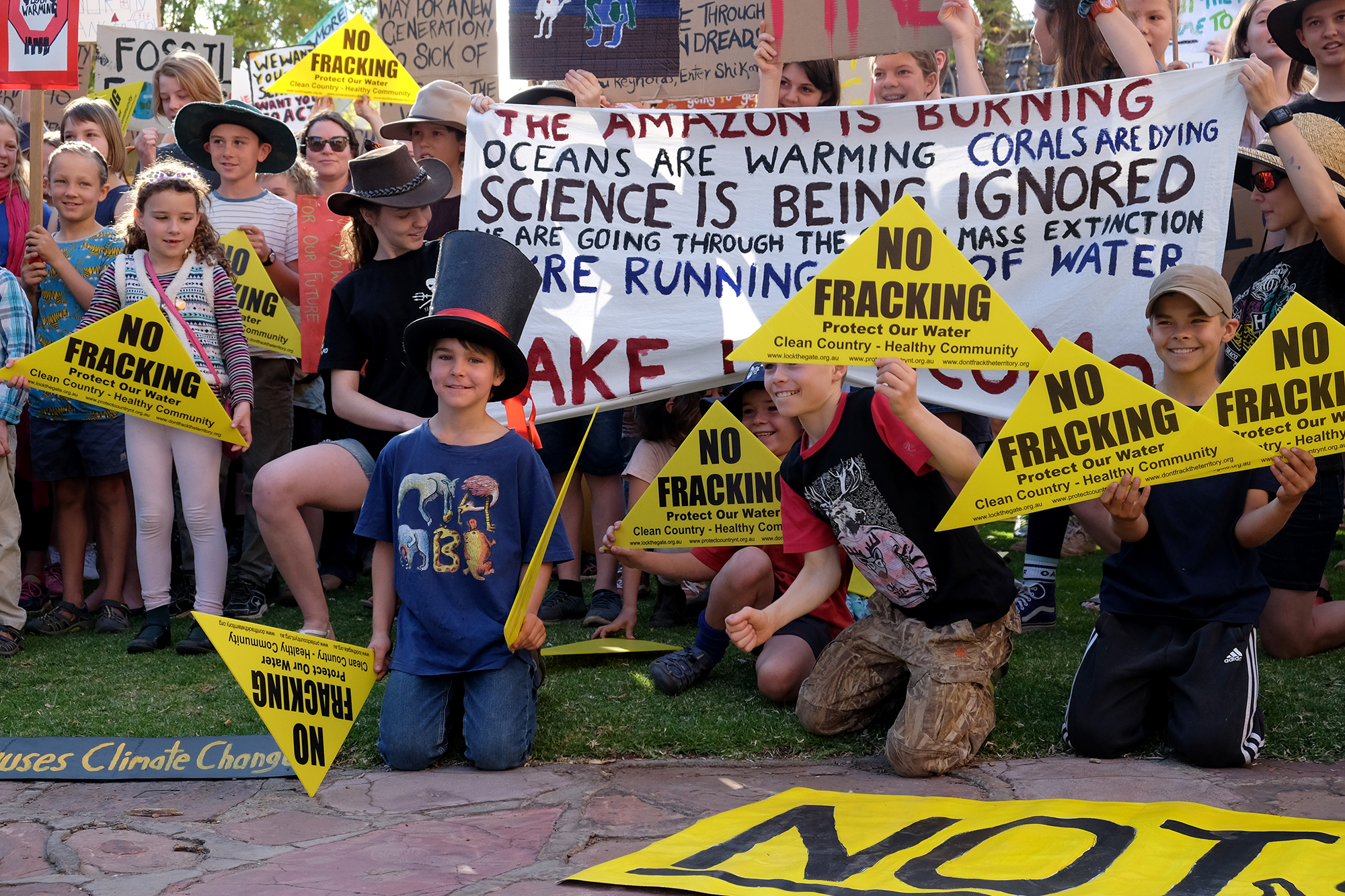
September 2019 climate strike in Alice Springs, Australia

The potential environmental effects of hydraulic fracturing include air pollution, contributions to climate change, high water consumption, groundwater contamination, land use, induced earthquakes, noise pollution, and various health effects on humans. Research is underway to determine if human health has been affected by air and water pollution, and rigorous following of safety procedures and regulation is required to avoid harm and to manage the risk of accidents that could cause harm.

=== Air contamination ===
The main agent of air contamination is methane that escapes from wells, along with industrial emissions from equipment used in the extraction process. Modern UK and EU regulation requires zero emissions of methane, a potent greenhouse gas. Escape of methane is a bigger problem in older wells than in ones built under more recent EU legislation.

=== Contributions to climate change ===
The lifecycle greenhouse gas emissions of shale oil are 21%-47% higher than those of conventional oil, while emissions from unconventional gas are from 6% lower to 43% higher than the emissions of conventional gas.

=== Water use and contamination ===
In December 2016, the United States Environmental Protection Agency (EPA) issued the "Hydraulic Fracturing for Oil and Gas: Impacts from the Hydraulic Fracturing Water Cycle on Drinking Water Resources in the United States (Final Report)". The EPA found scientific evidence that hydraulic fracturing activities can impact drinking water resources, due to:

- Water removed in order to be used for fracking in times or areas of low water availability
- Spills while handling fracking fluids and chemicals that result in large volumes or high concentrations of chemicals reaching groundwater resources
- Injection of fracking fluids into wells when mishandling machinery, allowing gases or liquids to move to groundwater resources
- Injection of fracking fluids directly into groundwater resources
- Leak of defective hydraulic fracturing wastewater to surface water
- Disposal or storage of fracking wastewater in unlined pits resulting in contamination of groundwater resources.

People obtain drinking water from either surface water, which includes rivers and reservoirs, or groundwater aquifers, accessed by public or private wells. Surface water may be contaminated through spillage and improperly built and maintained waste pits, and groundwater can be contaminated if the fluid is able to escape the formation being fractured through, for example, abandoned wells, fractures, and faults, or by produced water, as returning fluids may also contain dissolved constituents such as minerals and brine waters. The possibility of groundwater contamination from brine and fracturing fluid leakage through old abandoned wells is low. There are numerous documented instances in which nearby groundwater has been contaminated by fracking activities, requiring residents with private wells to obtain outside sources of water for drinking and everyday use.

Produced water is managed by underground injection, municipal and commercial wastewater treatment and discharge, self-contained systems at well sites or fields, and recycling to fracture future wells. Typically, less than half of the produced water used to fracture the formation is recovered.

After the well is fracked and produces oil and gas, fracking fluids often remain underground, where they may contaminate groundwater and connect to aquifer systems. The wastewater produced from the operations is also toxic and must be stored correctly, treated, and then discharged, but is often stored in holding ponds that can leak into the surrounding ground and impact wildlife. Federal and state responses to the impacted water resources have been mixed at best, according to…. According to … Federally, "regulation is insufficient due to certain explicit exemptions from the Safe Drinking Water Act, the Clean Air Act, and the Clean Water Act granted by the Energy Policy Act of 2005".

Another worry is per- and polyfluoroalkyl substances, also known as "PFAS" or "forever chemicals", which have been linked to cancer and birth defects. The chemicals used in fracking stay in the environment. Once there, those chemicals will eventually break down into PFAS. These chemicals can escape from drilling sites and into the groundwater, or leak into underground wells that store million gallons of wastewater.

In addition to water contamination, fracking uses a substantial amount of water. Hydraulic fracturing uses between 1.2 and 3.5 million US gallons (4,500 and 13,200 m^{3}) of water per well, with large projects using up to 5 million US gallons (19,000 m^{3}). Additional water is used when wells are refractured. An average well requires 3 to 8 million US gallons (11,000 to 30,000 m^{3}) of water over its lifetime. There is concern about the impact of fracking on local water resources, especially in the drier regions of the United States. These fracking sites are consuming millions of gallons of water from aquifers that are already dwindling. According to The New York Times, "nationwide, fracking has used up nearly 1.5 trillion gallons of water since 2011. That's how much tap water the entire state of Texas uses in a year."

According to the Oxford Institute for Energy Studies, greater volumes of fracturing fluids are required in Europe, where the shale depths are, on average, 1.5 times greater than in the U.S.

=== Land use ===
In the United States, over 12 million acres (4,900,000 ha) are being used for fossil fuel extraction, the equivalent of six Yellowstone National Parks. About 3.6 hectares (8.9 acres) of land is needed per each drill pad for surface installations. Well pad and supporting structure construction significantly fragments landscapes, which likely has negative effects on wildlife. These sites need to be remediated after wells are exhausted. Research indicates that effects on ecosystem services costs (i.e., those processes that the natural world provides to humanity) has reached over $250 million per year in the U.S. Each well pad (there are, on average, 10 wells per pad) leads to about 800 to 2,500 days of noisy activity, during preparatory and hydraulic fracturing processes, which affect both residents and local wildlife. In addition, noise is created by continuous truck traffic (sand, etc.) needed in hydraulic fracturing.

In July 2013, the US Federal Railroad Administration listed oil contamination by hydraulic fracturing chemicals as "a possible cause" of corrosion in oil tank cars.

=== Induced seismic activity ===
Hydraulic fracturing has been tied to induced seismicity, or earthquakes, in regions where few or no earthquakes were previously recorded. Fracking has been the major catalyst for at least 2% of earthquakes in the United States, according to the United States Geological Survey, although this number could be higher. Geologists have known since the 1960s that pushing fluids into the ground, as done during fracking, can set off earthquakes, but the USGS has argued that this was ignored by many fossil-fuel companies. The connection was first recognized when a well was drilled outside a plant in Denver, and more than 700 small to modest size earthquakes ensued, corresponding with the volume and pressure of the injections into the well. Behind a large increase in these earthquakes are wastewater injection wells, in which wells are drilled horizontally, a process used in many fracking operations. A .SGS survey reported that up to 7 states have a similar earthquake risk to that of California, with hydraulic fracturing and similar practices being a prime contributing factor.

Texas and Oklahoma have been two of the regions most impacted by fracking induced seismic activity. Prior to 2008, not a single earthquake had been recorded in the Dallas-Fort Worth region of Texas, but, since then, the region has been experiencing a sixfold increase in earthquakes. The rise in earthquakes in the area directly coincides with the increase in oil drilling activity. After aggressive drilling began in 2008 in Texas and Oklahoma regions, residents began feeling earthquakes, with more than 180 being recorded in Texas between October 30, 2008 and May 31, 2009. The largest recorded earthquake in Texas, which occurred in 2018, was a 4.0 magnitude earthquake that ultimately resulted from fracking and drilling. A better understanding of the geology of the area being fracked and used for injection wells can be helpful in mitigating the potential for significant seismic events.

== Regulations ==
Countries using or considering use of hydraulic fracturing have implemented different regulations, including developing federal and regional legislation, and local zoning limitations. In 2011, after public pressure, France became the first nation to ban hydraulic fracturing, based on the precautionary principle as well as the principle of preventive and corrective action of environmental hazards. The ban was upheld by an October 2013 ruling of the Constitutional Council. Some other countries, such as Scotland, have placed a temporary moratorium on the practice due to public health concerns and strong public opposition. Countries like South Africa have lifted their bans, choosing to focus on regulation instead of outright prohibition. In 2013, Germany announced draft regulations that would allow the use of hydraulic fracturing for the exploitation of shale gas deposits, with the exception of wetland areas. In China, regulation on shale gas still faces hurdles, as it has complex interrelations with other regulatory regimes, especially trade. Many states in Australia have either permanently or temporarily banned fracturing for hydrocarbons. In 2019, hydraulic fracturing was banned in the UK.

The European Union has adopted a recommendation for minimum principles for using high-volume hydraulic fracturing. Its regulatory regime requires full disclosure of all additives. In the United States, the Ground Water Protection Council launched FracFocus.org, an online voluntary disclosure database for hydraulic fracturing fluids funded by oil and gas trade groups and the U.S. Department of Energy. Hydraulic fracturing is excluded from the Safe Drinking Water Act's underground injection control's regulation, except when diesel fuel is used. The EPA assures surveillance of the issuance of drilling permits when diesel fuel is employed.

In 2012, Vermont became the first state in the United States to ban hydraulic fracturing. On 17 December 2014, New York became the second state to issue a complete ban on any hydraulic fracturing due to potential risks to human health and the environment.

== See also ==
- Directional drilling
- Environmental impact of electricity generation
- Environmental effects of petroleum
- Fracking by country
- Fracking in the United States
- Fracking in the United Kingdom
- In situ leach
- New York energy law#Hydrofracking
- Nuclear power
- Peak oil
- Stranded asset
- Shale oil extraction
- Vaca Muerta

== Sources ==
- Kibble, A.; Cabianca, T.; Daraktchieva, Z.; Gooding, T.; Smithard, J.; Kowalczyk, G.; McColl, N. P.; Singh, M.; Mitchem, L.; Lamb, P.; Vardoulakis, S.; Kamanyire, R. (June 2014). Review of the Potential Public Health Impacts of Exposures to Chemical and Radioactive Pollutants as a Result of the Shale Gas Extraction Process (PDF) (Report). Public Health England. ISBN 978-0-85951-752-2. PHE-CRCE-009.
