= Francis "Tug" Nadeau Irving =

American oil well shooter (1903-1952)

Francis Nadeau "Tug" Irving
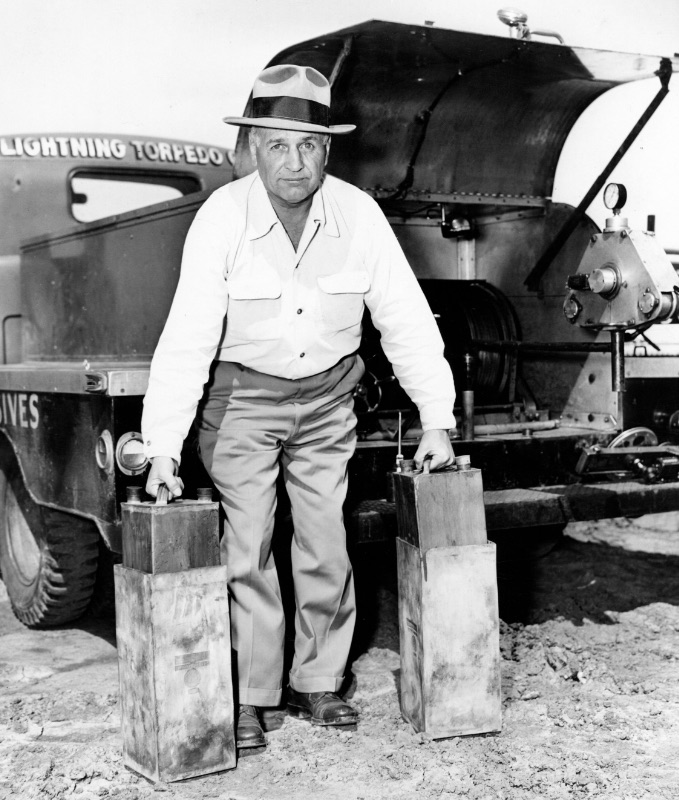
- An Oil Well Shooter Tug Irving
- Born: June 30, 1903; Temple, Texas, U.S.
- Died: May 28, 1952 (aged 48); Oklahoma City, Oklahoma
- Resting place: Rose Hill Burial Park, Abbey Mausoleum in Oklahoma City, Oklahoma
- Occupations: Oil Well Shooter and Driller
- Spouse: Zelma Harmon Irving (m. 1937; died 1988)
- Children: Kent Nadeau Irving

Francis Nadeau "Tug" Irving (June 20, 1903 - May 28, 1952) was a prominent oil well shooter and operator in Oklahoma during the 1930s and 1940s oil rush. Born in Temple, Texas, he grew up in El Reno, Oklahoma. Prior to his career in the oil industry, Irving was a semi-professional boxer who used his earnings to finance his education at universities in Oklahoma and Oregon. While attending the University of Oregon, he became the Pacific Coast amateur lightweight champion.

Irving began his career in the oil well shooting business working for veteran shooter Roy Lightner. Later, he purchased Lightner Torpedo Co., renaming it Lightning Torpedo Co. Under his leadership, the company expanded throughout Oklahoma and Texas. In addition to his work as a torpedo operator, Irving manufactured his own nitroglycerin for use in shooting oil wells.

Because of the unique and high-risk nature of his profession, Irving gained both business and political recognition during his lifetime. Additionally, he was an oil well drilling contractor as the owner of Irving Drilling Co., which drilled wildcat oil wells for wildcatters in Oklahoma.

== Early life ==
Tug Irving, originally named Francis Irving, was born in Temple, Texas, on June 20, 1903. In approximately 1911, the family relocated to El Reno, Oklahoma. During his high school years, Tug Irving excelled in both sports and extracurricular activities. He lettered in football and track and field while participating actively in DeMolay and Delta Sigma fraternities.

By the fall of 1920, Francis began to go by his nickname Tug Irving,. He became widely known and conducted business under this alias.

== Education ==
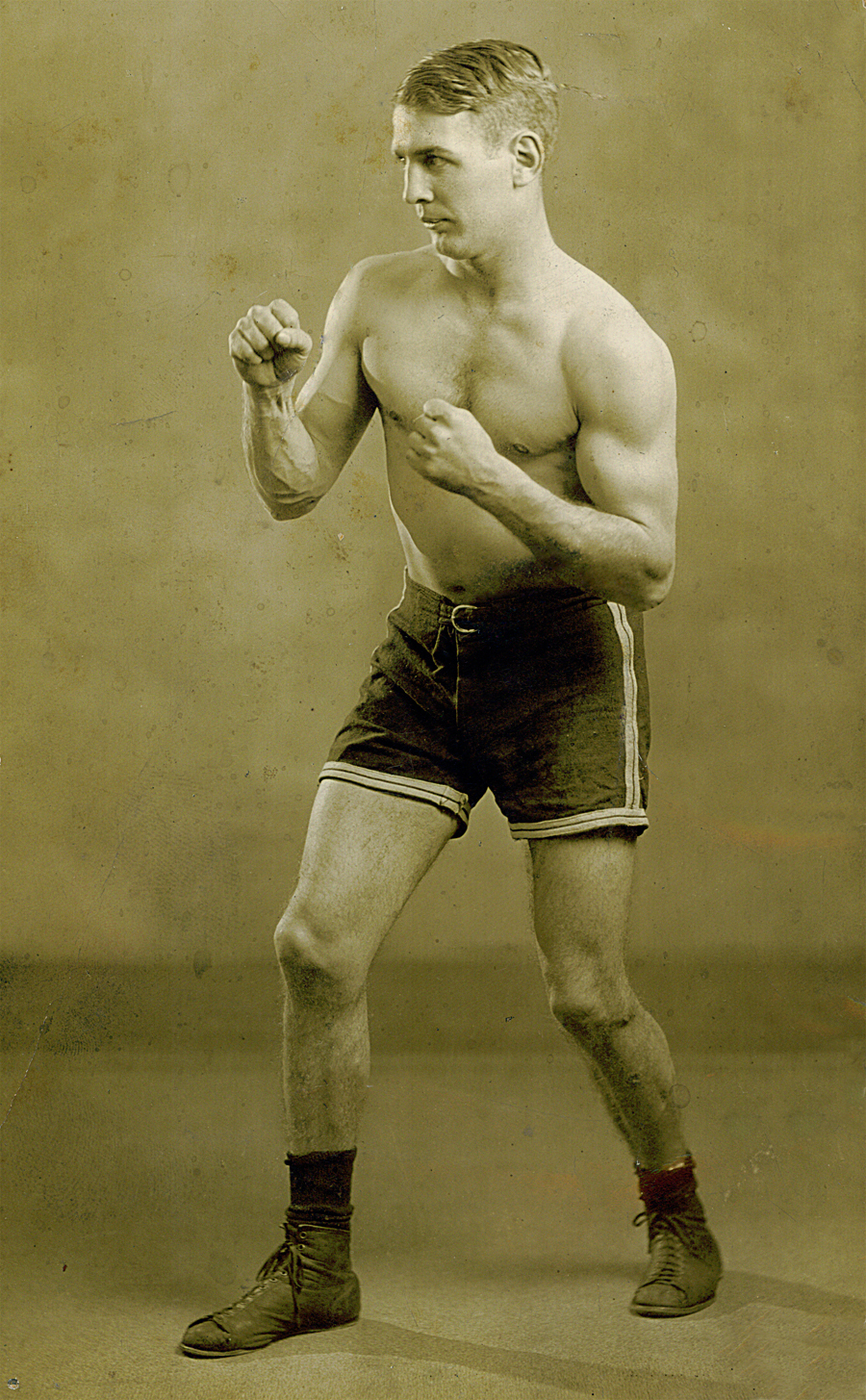
Tug Irving Boxing 1925

During his college years from 1923 to 1926, Tug Irving attended the University of Oklahoma and later the University of Oregon.

In November 1923, he was elected Vice-President of the Battle Ax honorary freshman fraternity at the University of Oklahoma. He also secured a position on the university's freshman football team as an end or quarterback with hopes of being promoted to the varsity squad the following year.

In February 1924, Irving ran for Secretary of the Freshman Class. Later that year, he decided to transfer to the University of Oregon.

Upon his arrival at the University of Oregon, Irving quickly made a mark, securing a place in the freshman football squad as an end. He also emerged as the premier boxer for the university and the Multnomah Amateur Athletic Club. Later he went to Portland to enter the 1925 Pacific Northwest Championship. Although he lost the four-round match in a decision. Later, Irving became the Pacific Coast amateur lightweight champion.

In June 1925, Irving went out for the Multnomah Amateur Athletic Club football team at the end position. He returned to El Reno in January 1926 and then returned to the University of Oklahoma, where he pledged to the Kappa Sigma national fraternity.

Upon returning to OU, he sought to coach a boxing team that he hoped would become a lettered sport.

Irving graduated from the University of Oklahoma in 1926. This period marked the foundation for his future endeavors.

== Oil career and Military service ==
In 1927 he entered the oil industry, working for the Indian Territory Illuminating Oil Company (ITIO). He temporarily returned to boxing and won a technical knockout in the third round at a company-sponsored event. However, his passion for the oil business soon overshadowed his love for boxing.

Two years later, Tug Irving joined Coline Oil Co. as a geological scout, using his knowledge and skills to contribute to the exploration of oil reserves in Oklahoma. During this time, he showcased leadership and initiative by assisting in organizing a geological club in Oklahoma City. This club brought together geologists from most of the major companies in the region, fostering collaboration and knowledge sharing within the industry.

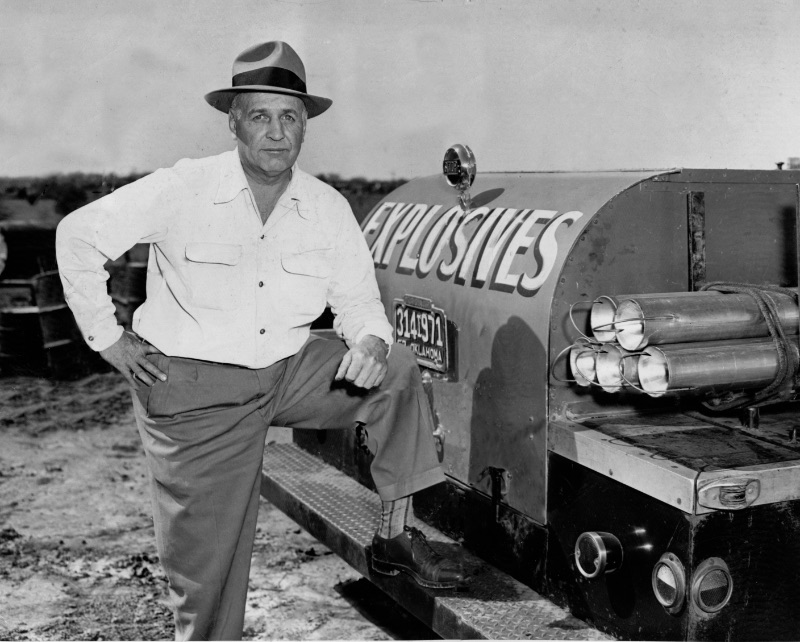
Tug Irving - Lightning Torpedo Co.

In 1933, Irving left Coline Oil Co. to take on a new challenge as the manager of the newly established Lighter Torpedo Company in Oklahoma City. His appointment signified growing recognition of his skills and abilities in the oil sector. Under his leadership, the company saw significant growth, contributing to the booming oil industry in the region.

In July 1936, Irving purchased Lighter Torpedo Co. for $25,000, rebranding it as Lightning Torpedo Co. This company would serve as the foundation for his future endeavors.

Expansion followed swiftly, with operations spreading across four states. Not content with simply acquiring existing businesses, Irving also began manufacturing his own nitroglycerin, a crucial component in oil well shooting.

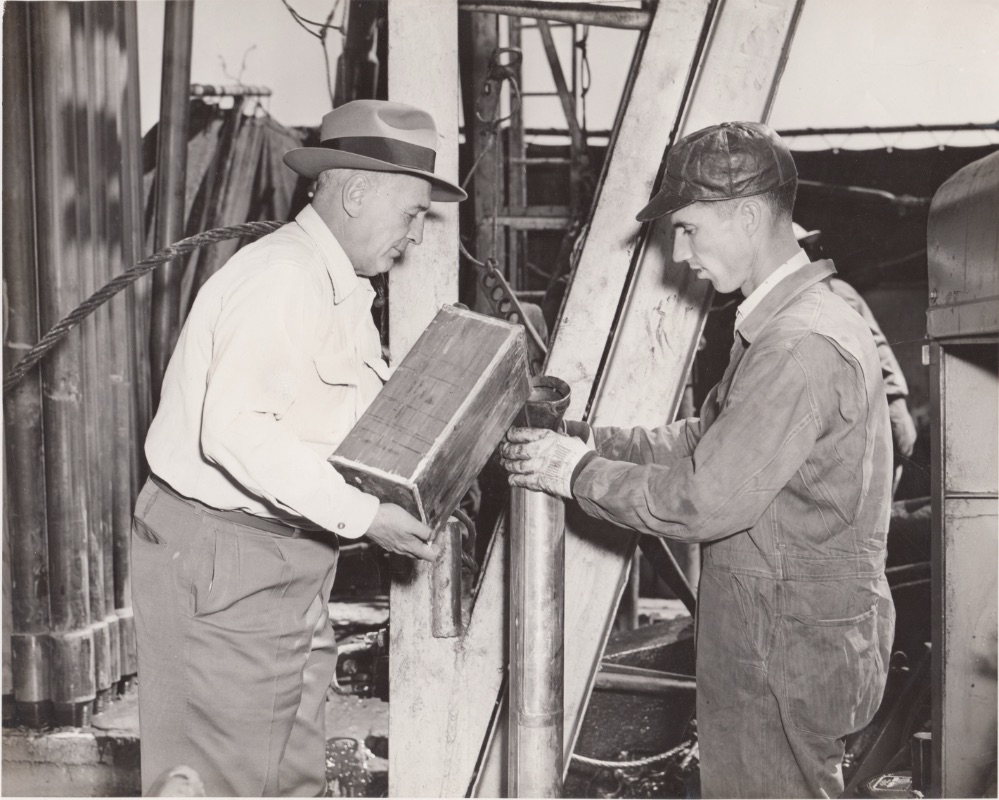
Pouring nitroglycerin into oil torpedo.

Irving's personal life intertwined with his professional success when he married Zelma Harmon of Durant, Oklahoma, on April 18, 1937, at her sister's house in Fort Smith, Arkansas.

By 1940, Irving ventured further into the oil industry by establishing Irving Drilling Co., expanding his business into the oil drilling contracting sector.

Irving's business acumen and social skills quickly garnered him notoriety within Oklahoma's oil circles. He forged close friendships with prominent figures such as Travis Kerr and Governor Robert S. Kerr also of Kerr-MCGee Oil Industries a relationship that reflected his growing influence in the industry and political sphere.

During World War II, Irving entered the United States Army at the rank of Captain,. He was stationed at the Navajo Ordinance Depot in Flagstaff, Arizona.

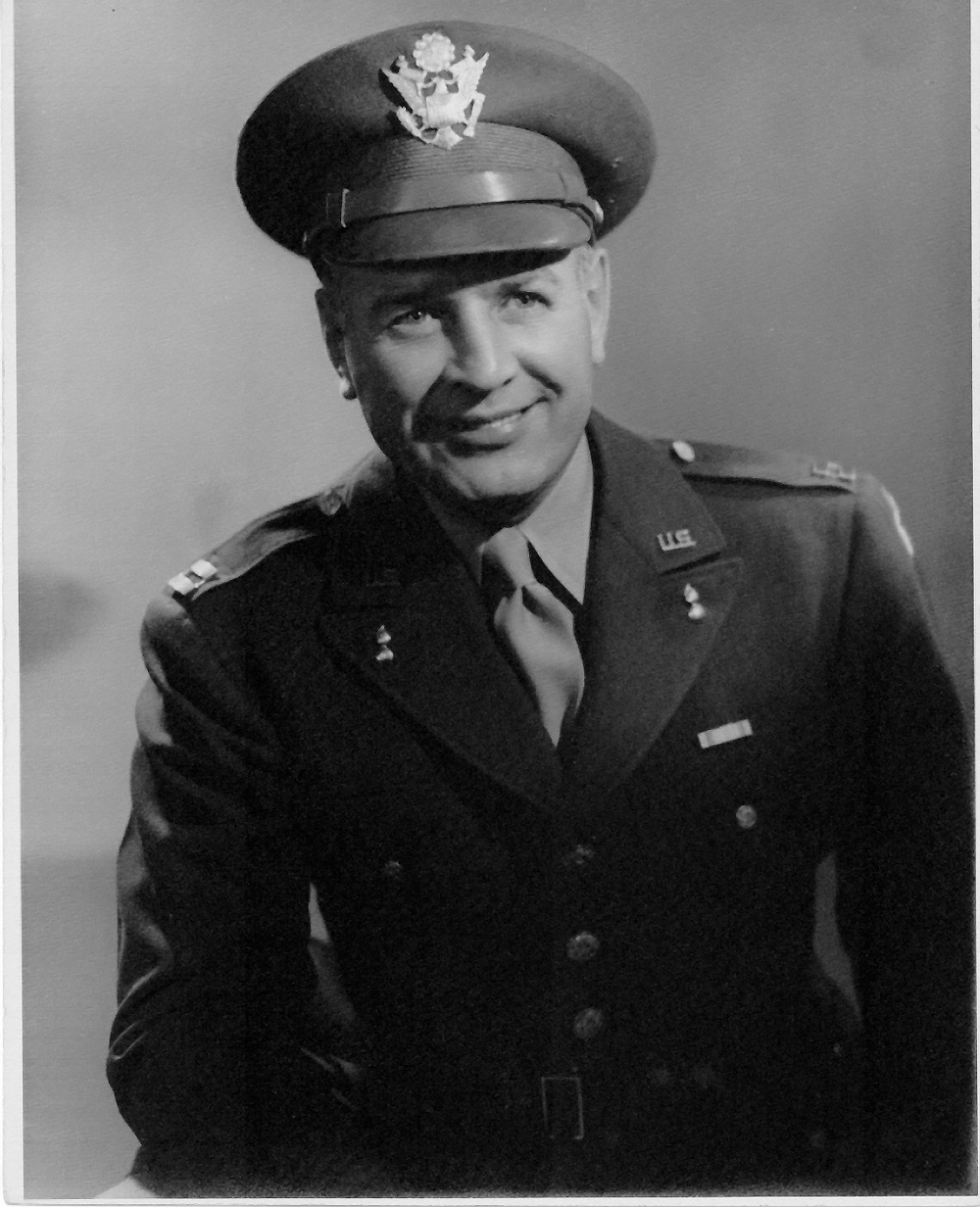
Francis "Tug" Irving Captain US Army

In February 1945, Irving was granted inactive service to return to his oil business in order to better serve the war effort. This move allowed him to leverage his expertise and resources for the benefit of the nation during a critical time in history.

In July 1947. He became the father of a baby boy Kent Nadeau Irving weighing 7 pounds. Thus began a new chapter in Irving's life as he transitioned from military service and oil entrepreneur to a family man.

== Death ==
Francis "Tug" Irving on Wednesday May 28, 1952, became the center of one of the most significant news stories of 1952 following his tragic death. Irving was fatally shot in the home of Fritz O. Olson, his drilling superintendent.

The incident occurred in Olson's residence, and Irving succumbed to two shotgun blasts at close range. One wound entered through his lower abdomen, while the other was inflicted above his hip, suggesting a confrontation at very close quarters.

Olson was arrested later that day and remanded into custody for trial, with the case garnering extensive coverage throughout the rest of that year.. Given the high-profile nature of Irving, a special prosecutor was appointed to oversee the proceedings. The judge in the case instructed the jury that they could only consider verdicts of murder or accidental death, ruling out manslaughter as an option.

After the trial, on December 10, 1952, Fritz O. Olson was acquitted of murder charges by the district court jury. They deemed Irving's death to be an accident.

Irving's life and untimely demise continue to be remembered as a significant event in the history of Oklahoma and the oil industry.
