= Lightning Torpedo Company =

Defunct company in Oklahoma City, Oklahoma US

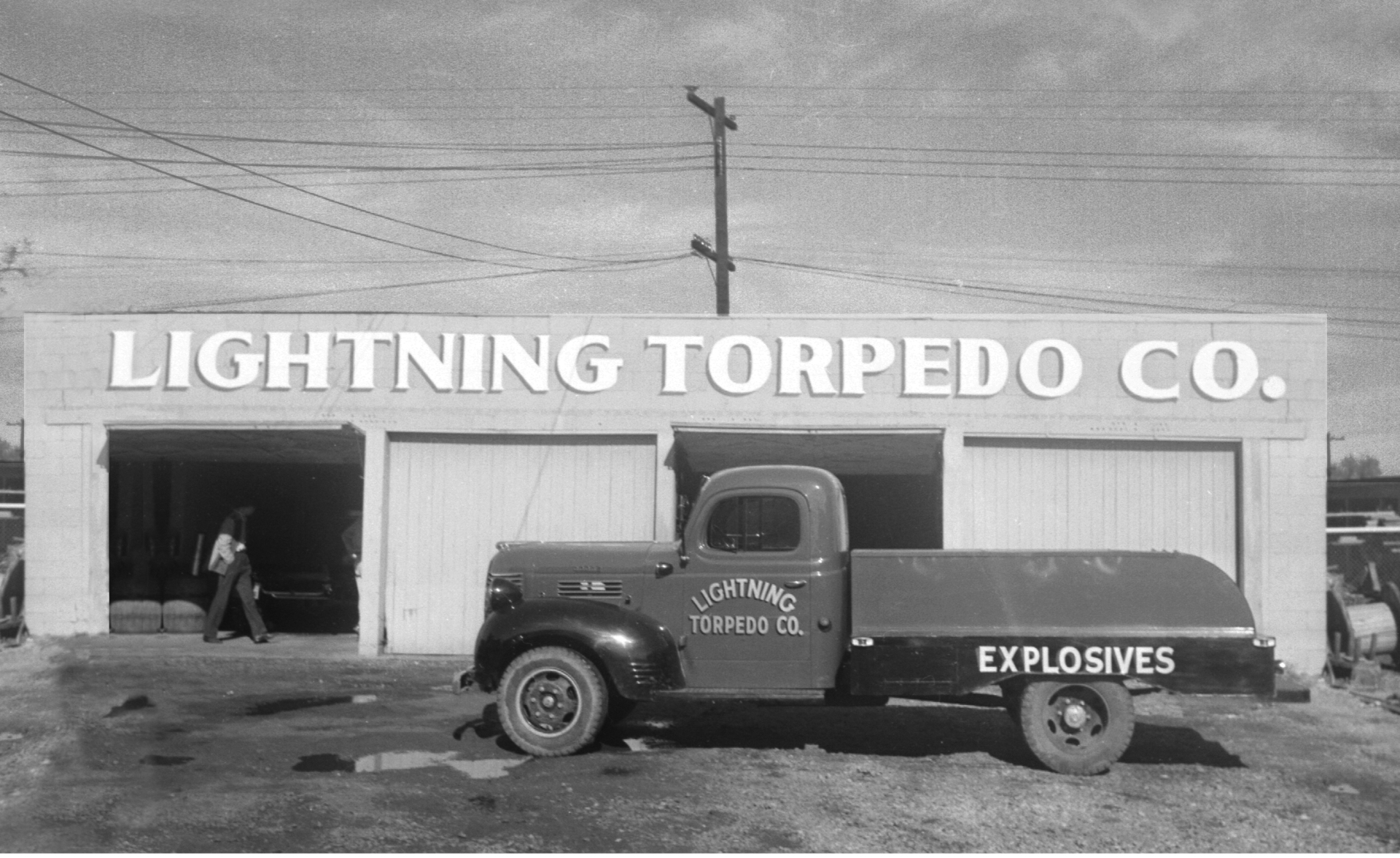
- Lightning Torpedo Company truck
- Company type: Private
- Industry: Oil and gas
- Founded: 1933
- Defunct: 1952
- Headquarters: Oklahoma City, Oklahoma, U.S.
- Key people: Francis "Tug" Irving (manager, owner)
- Products: Oil well shooting, nitroglycerin

The Lightning Torpedo Company was an oil well shooting and operating company based in Oklahoma City, Oklahoma, during the 1930s and 1940s oil rush till the early 1950s. The company grew under the leadership of Francis "Tug" Irving, a prominent oil well shooter and operator in Oklahoma during that period.

== Background ==
The company was initially established as Lighter Torpedo Company in 1933, with Irving taking on the role of its manager. In July 1936, Irving purchased the company and rebranded it as Lightning Torpedo Company.

== Growth and expansion ==
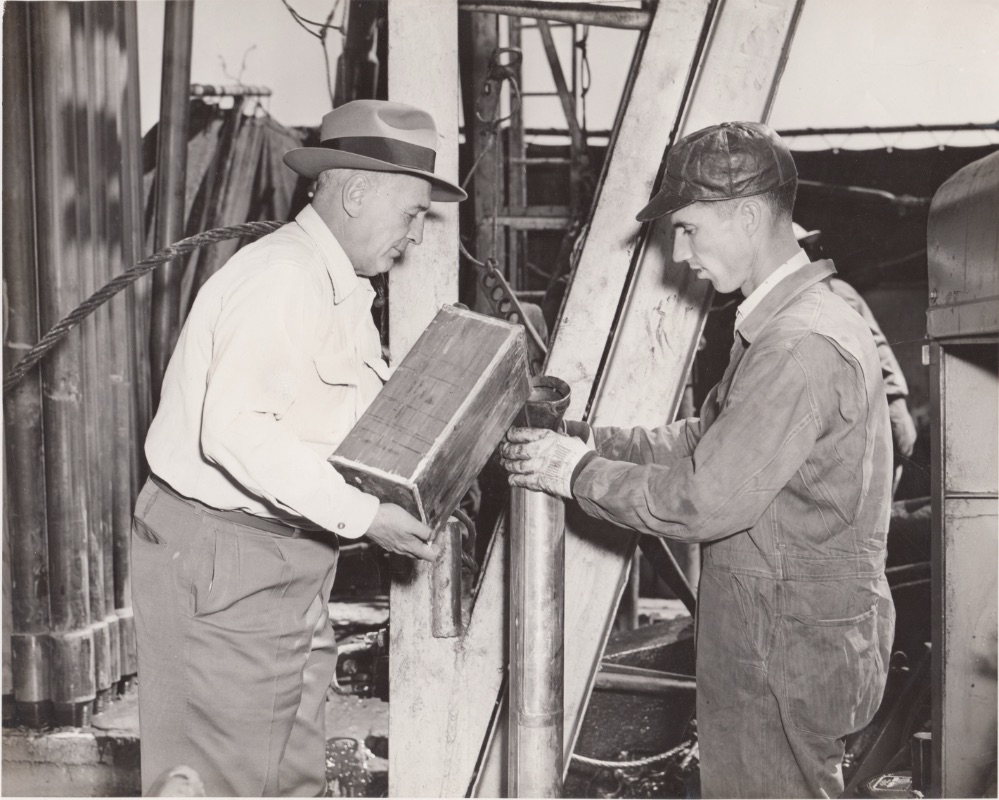
Pouring Nitroglycerin into torpedo.

The company expanded throughout Oklahoma and Texas. The company also manufactured its own nitroglycerin for use in shooting oil wells. The company was unique for oil industry in the region. The company ceased operations in June 1952 after the death of Tug Irving.
