= Torpedo, Pennsylvania =

Unincorporated community in Pennsylvania, US

Torpedo
- Unincorporated community
- Etymology: nitroglycerin "torpedoes" used in the petroleum industry
- Location of Torpedo in Pennsylvania
- Coordinates: 41°46′45.2″N 79°27′56.2″W
- Country: United States
- State: Pennsylvania
- County: Warren
- Settled: ~1845
- Elevation: 1,391 ft (424 m)
- Time zone: UTC-5 (Eastern (EST))
  - Summer (DST): UTC-4 (EDT)
- ZIP code: 16340

Torpedo is a village located on Pennsylvania Route 27 in Pittsfield Township, Warren County in the U.S. state of Pennsylvania. The village got its unusual name from an incident involving torpedoes used in oil wells to increase the flow of oil, which contained unstable nitroglycerin.

== History ==
Torpedo was first settled sometime around 1845 after the construction of a mill, which closed 10 or 12 years later. A lumber mill was opened in 1875–1876.

Torpedo acquired its name during the winter of 1882–1883, when a horse-drawn wagon loaded with 880 pounds (400 kg) of nitroglycerin torpedoes bound for Clarendon got stuck on a nearby set of railroad tracks for the Dunkirk, Allegheny Valley and Pittsburgh Railroad. One of the horses had tripped on the gap between the rail and a wooden plank, and fallen. The driver, knowing a passenger train was due, attempted unsuccessfully to free the fallen horse. Failing to free it, he unhitched the other horse and moved it to a safe distance. The driver had started to unload the torpedoes from the wagon, when the train came around the bend. Even after applying the brakes, the train still struck the fallen horse at nearly full speed, severing two of its legs. The wagon containing the torpedoes was tipped over, but the nitroglycerin did not explode, because the wagon was mired in deep mud. None of the train's passengers and crew were injured.

== Geography ==
Torpedo is located on Pennsylvania Route 27 in Pittsfield Township, 15 miles (24 km) north of Pennsylvania Route 36 in Pleasantville, Venango County and 7 miles (11 km) south of U.S. Route 6.

== Sources ==
- Schneck, J. S.; Rann, William S., eds. (1887). History of Warren County, Pennsylvania. Syracuse, NY: D. Mason and Co.
