= Waterless fracturing =

Waterless fracturing or Non-Aqueous fracturing is an alternative to hydraulic fracturing in which liquefied petroleum gas (LPG) is formed by using non-water fracturing fluid, most commonly by compressing propane gas into a liquid, and mixing it with a gelling agent forming a thick gel.

The waterless fracturing fluid is pumped into shale formations creating pressure of about 100–200 psi. Excessive pressure cracks the rocks and releases natural gases in the process. In waterless fracturing, most of the released gas is able to get to the surface because the propane used does not block drilled pathways. During the pumping, LPG is converted into gas, which can lead to a high retrieval rate, depending on the specific conditions of the well. Some studies claim that gel used in LPG fracturing tends to be less likely to bring toxic chemicals or underground radioactivity to the surface compared to water-based methods. Additionally, the gel can be reused in certain applications, reducing material waste. Waterless fracturing is a more expensive process than hydraulic fracturing as propane is more expensive than water. The use of propane necessitates rigorous monitoring, as any leak could potentially lead to an explosion hazard.

LPG fracturing was developed by Gastric, an energy company based in Calgary, Alberta, Canada. LGP fracturing has been in use since 2008 in gas wells of Alberta, British Columbia, New Brunswick, Texas, Pennsylvania, Colorado, Oklahoma, and New Mexico.

Advancements are also being made regarding other possible forms of waterless fracturing, including oil-based and CO_{2} energized oil fracturing, explosive and propellant fracturing, gelled LPG and alcohol fracturing, gas fracturing, CO2 fracturing, and cryogenic fracturing.

== Environmental Impact ==
In the 21st century hydraulic fracturing has increased oil and gas extraction from shale and tight sandstone reservoirs. Taking into consideration formation damage, water consumption, and water pollution, efforts have been devoted to developing waterless fracturing technologies because of their potential to alleviate these issues.
