= Oil well shooting =

Oil well shooting is a method of increasing production of an oil well by removing obstructions to drilling, straightening crooked holes, preventing water penetration, and/or increasing the flow of oil. Before 1910, a shell, made of dynamite and a sheet metal casing were lowered into a well and detonated by a blasting cap with a fuse. By 1918, the practice had evolved to use blasting gelatin, a mixture of nitroglycerin, guncotton and wood pulp.

== Notable professionals ==
- Merle Haggard worked as an oil well shooter
- Francis "Tug" Nadeau Irving
