= Torpedo (petroleum) =

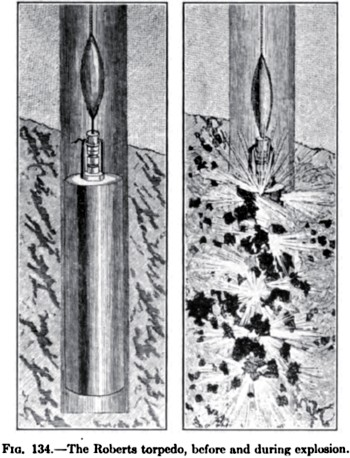
A torpedo designed by Edward A. L. Roberts.

A torpedo is an explosive device used, especially in the early days of the petroleum industry, to fracture the surrounding rock at the bottom of an oil well to stimulate the flow of oil and to remove built-up paraffin wax that would restrict the flow. Earlier torpedoes used gunpowder, but the use of nitroglycerin eventually became widespread. The development of hydraulic fracturing rendered torpedoes obsolete, and is the primary fracturing process used today.

== Use ==
A torpedo consisted of canisters that were filled with an explosive and lowered into a well via a rope or wire. Gunpowder was used in the first torpedoes, but nitroglycerin was found to work better despite its instability. The well is usually filled with water to prevent the explosion from escaping upwards. Originally, the topmost canister had a percussion cap that was to detonate the main charge. An iron weight was dropped down the well to set the torpedo off. After incidents of premature explosions, a second method was developed in which a tube of the explosive was placed in a larger tube that was packed with sand. A fuse was wound around the inner tube, connected to a blasting cap. When the torpedo was to be used, the inner tube was filled with nitroglycerin and corked; the fuse was lit and torpedo was dropped down the well.

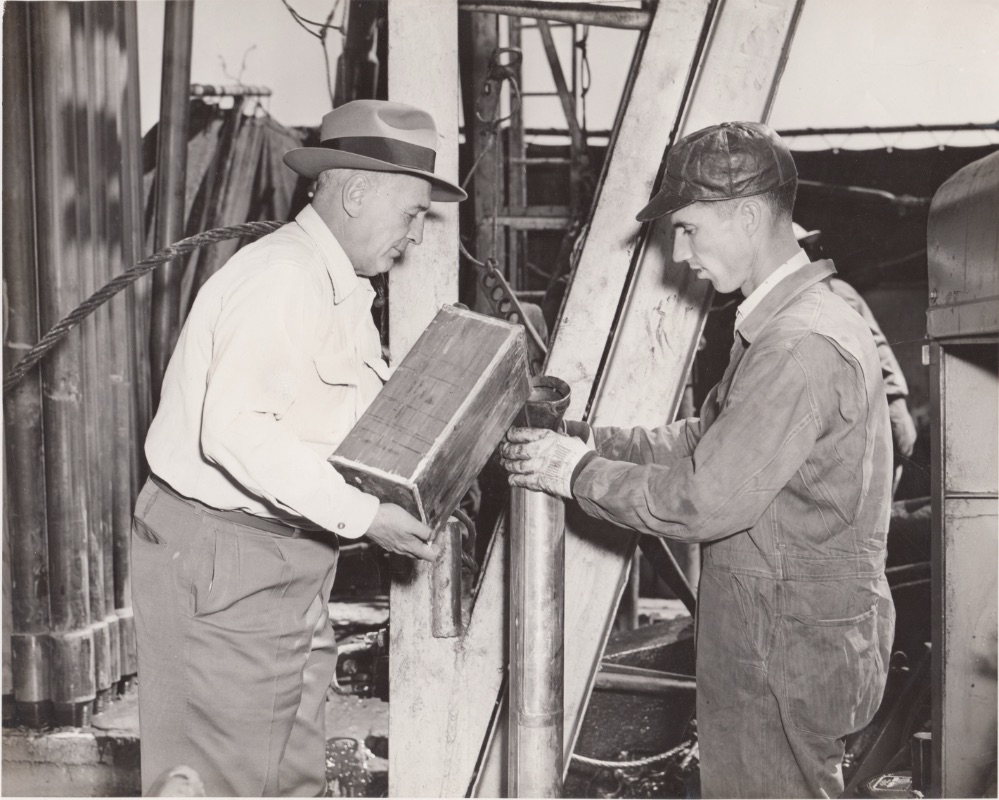
Torpedo being filled

Torpedoes were generally used to remove buildup of paraffin wax from an oil well. Before the use of torpedoes caught on, boiling water or benzene was often poured down wells to try to dissolve the paraffin. Torpedoes were also used to fracture the rock to allow the oil to flow more easily.

== History ==
Edward A. L. Roberts developed the first torpedo and submitted a patent application in November 1864. Roberts, an American Civil War veteran, came up with the concept of using water to "tamp" the resulting explosion, after watching Confederate artillery rounds explode in a canal at the Battle of Fredericksburg. Roberts developed his first torpedoes in 1865 and 1866. In November 1866 he was granted a patent on his torpedo application, and founded the Roberts Petroleum Torpedo Company. William Reed also developed a torpedo design and went on to found a rival company "for the purpose of infringing and breaking down the Roberts patent. Roberts charged $100–200 per torpedo as well as a royalty amounting to 1/15 of the increased oil production. To avoid paying the exorbitant fees, an owner of a well would often hire men who illegally produced their own torpedoes and used them at night—the practice giving rise to term "moonlighting". Roberts spent $250,000 to protect his patent from the "moonlighters" by hiring the Pinkerton National Detective Agency and filing numerous lawsuits. Roberts' torpedo patents expired in 1879.

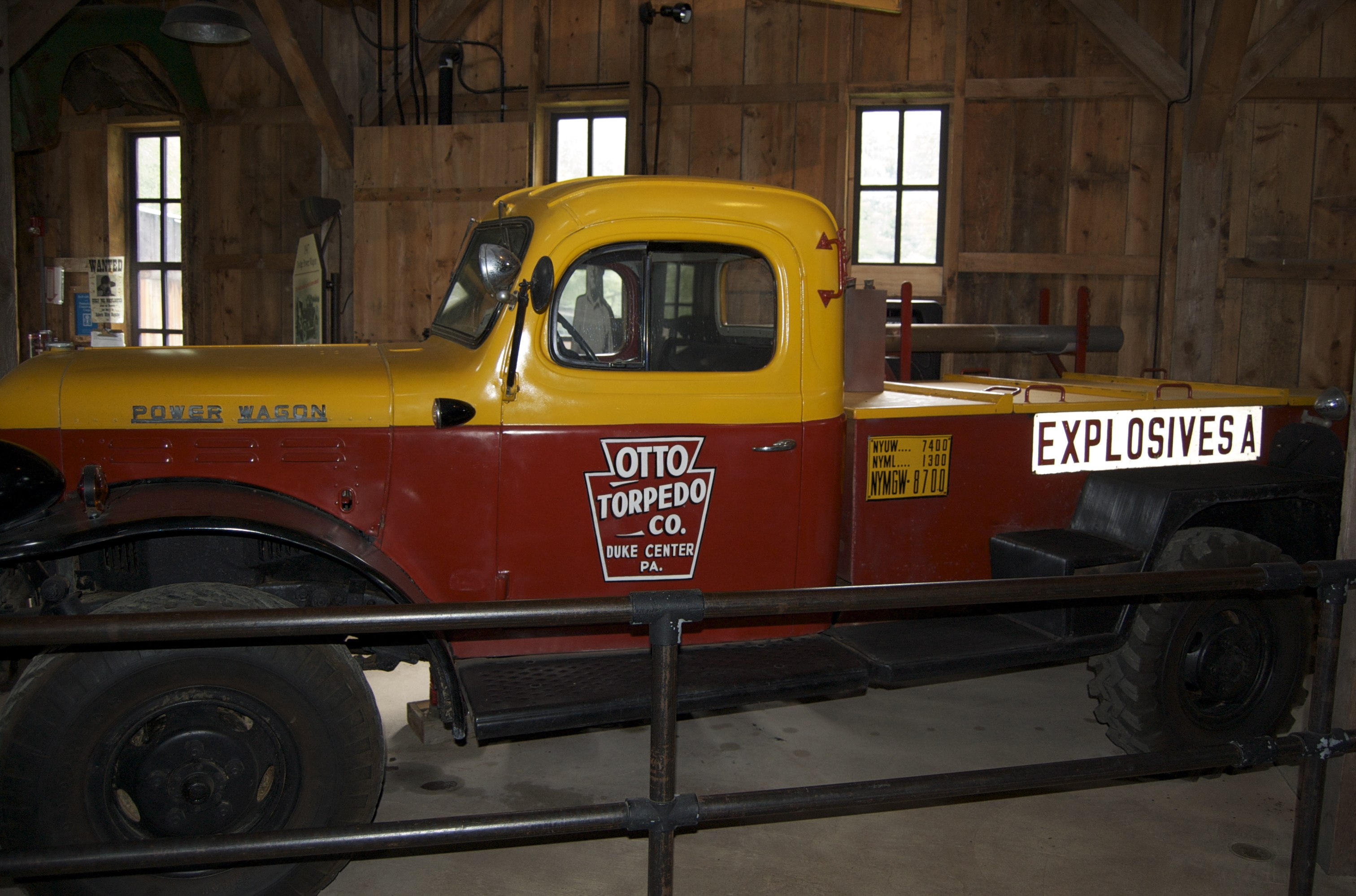
A 1947 Dodge Power Wagon used to transport torpedoes

Torpedoes manufactured today use modern explosives, with the last nitroglycerin torpedo being used on May 5, 1990.

== Sources ==
- Bacon, Raymond Foss; Hamor, William Allen (1916). The American petroleum industry. Vol. 1. New York City: McGraw-Hill.
- Wells, Bruce A., ed. (September 2007). "Shooters". The Petroleum Age. 4 (3). American Oil and Gas Historical Society: 8–9. ISSN 1930-5915.
- Whiteshot, Charles Austin (1905). The oil-well driller: a history of the world's greatest enterprise, the oil industry. Mannington, West Virginia: Charles Austin Whiteshot.
