= Petrophysics =

Study of physical and chemical properties of rocks

Petrophysics (from the Greek πέτρα, petra, "rock" and φύσις, physis, "nature") is the study of physical and chemical rock properties and their interactions with fluids.

A major application of petrophysics is in studying reservoirs for the hydrocarbon industry. Petrophysicists work together with reservoir engineers and geoscientists to understand the porous media properties of the reservoir. Particularly how the pores are interconnected in the subsurface, controlling the accumulation and migration of hydrocarbons. Some fundamental petrophysical properties determined are lithology, porosity, water saturation, permeability, and capillary pressure.

The petrophysicists workflow measures and evaluates these petrophysical properties through well-log interpretation (i.e. in-situ reservoir conditions) and core analysis in the laboratory. During well perforation, different well-log tools are used to measure the petrophysical and mineralogical properties through radioactivity and seismic technologies in the borehole. In addition, core plugs are taken from the well as sidewall core or whole core samples. These studies are combined with geological, geophysical, and reservoir engineering studies to model the reservoir and determine its economic feasibility.

While most petrophysicists work in the hydrocarbon industry, some also work in the mining, water resources, geothermal energy, and carbon capture and storage industries. Petrophysics is part of the geosciences, and its studies are used by petroleum engineering, geology, geochemistry, exploration geophysics and others.

== Fundamental petrophysical properties ==
The following are the fundamental petrophysical properties used to characterize a reservoir:

- Lithology: A description of the rock's physical characteristics, such as grain size, composition and texture. By studying the lithology of local geological outcrops and core samples, geoscientists can use a combination of log measurements, such as natural gamma, neutron, density and resistivity, to determine the lithology down the well.
- Porosity: The pore space volume portion related to the bulk rock volume, symbolized as $\phi$. It is typically calculated using data from an instrument that measures the reaction of the rock to bombardment by neutrons or gamma rays but can also be derived from sonic and NMR logging. A helium porosimeter is the main technique to measure grain volume and porosity in the laboratory.
- Water saturation: The fraction of the pore space occupied by water. This is typically calculated using data from an instrument that measures the resistivity of the rock and applying empirical or theoretical water saturation models; the most worldwide used is Archie's (1942) model. It is known by the symbol $S_w$.
- Permeability: The quantity of fluid (water or hydrocarbon) that can flow through a rock as a function of time and pressure, related to how interconnected the pores are, and it is known by the symbol $k$. Formation testing is the only tool that can directly measure a rock formation's permeability down a well. In case of its absence, which is common in most cases, an estimate for permeability can be derived from empirical relationships with other measurements such as porosity, NMR and sonic logging. Darcy's law is applied in the laboratory to measure the core plug permeability with an inert gas or liquid (i.e. that does not react with the rock).
- Formation thickness (h) of rock with enough permeability to deliver fluids to a well bore, this property is often called “net reservoir rock.” In the oil and gas industry, another quantity “net pay” is computed which is the thickness of rock that can deliver hydrocarbons to the well bore at a profitable rate.

== Rock mechanical properties ==
The rock's mechanical or geomechanical properties are also used within petrophysics to determine the reservoir strength, elastic properties, hardness, ultrasonic behaviour, index characteristics and in situ stresses.

Petrophysicists use acoustic and density measurements of rocks to compute their mechanical properties and strength. They measure the compressional (P) wave velocity of sound through the rock and the shear (S) wave velocity and use these with the density of the rock to compute the rock's compressive strength, which is the compressive stress that causes a rock to fail, and the rocks' flexibility, which is the relationship between stress and deformation for a rock. Converted-wave analysis is also determines the subsurface lithology and porosity.

Geomechanics measurements are useful for drillability assessment, wellbore and open-hole stability design, log strength and stress correlations, and formation and strength characterization. These measurements are also used to design dams, roads, foundations for buildings, and many other large construction projects. They can also help interpret seismic signals from the Earth, either manufactured seismic signals or those from earthquakes.

== Methods of petrophysical analysis ==
=== Core analysis ===
Core samples are pieces of rock collected from a subsurface formation during drilling operations, to study the physical and mechanical properties of the formation in detail. They provide the only direct evidence of the reservoir's formation rock structure. Core analysis is the "ground truth" data measured in a laboratory to determine the key petrophysical features of the in-situ rock. In the petroleum industry, rock samples are retrieved from the subsurface and measured by oil or service companies' core laboratories. This process is time-consuming and expensive; thus, it can only be applied to some of the wells drilled in a field. Also, proper design, planning and supervision decrease data redundancy and uncertainty. Client and laboratory teams must work aligned to optimise the core analysis process.

=== Well-logging ===
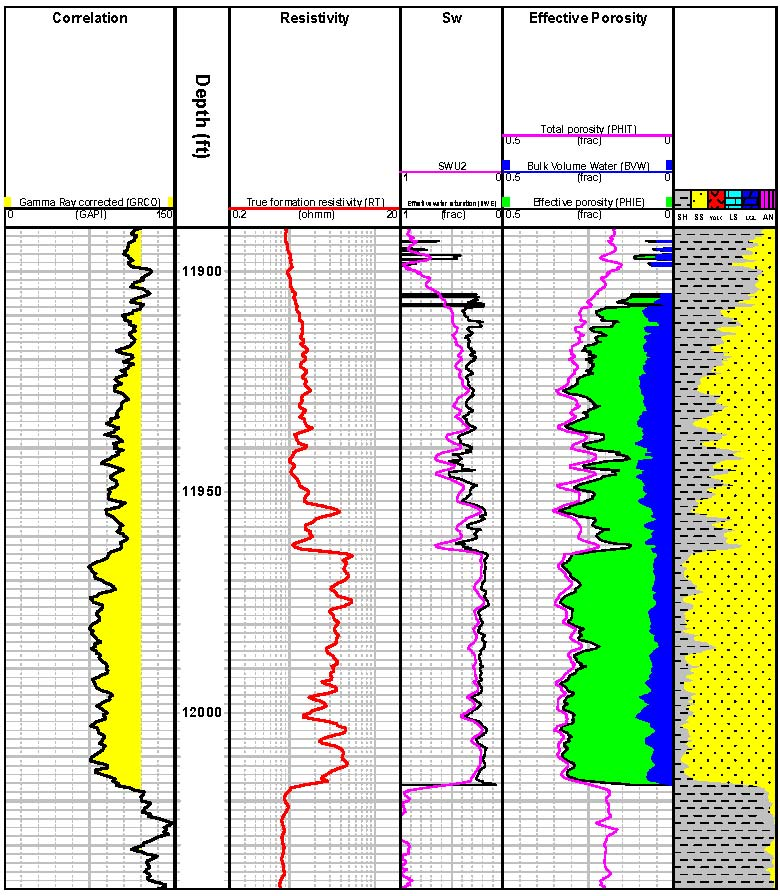
Figure 1

Well Logging is a relatively inexpensive method to obtain petrophysical properties downhole. Measurement tools are conveyed downhole using either wireline or LWD method.

An example of wireline logs is shown in Figure 1. The first “track” shows the natural gamma radiation level of the rock. The gamma radiation level “log” shows increasing radiation to the right and decreasing radiation to the left. The rocks emitting less radiation have more yellow shading. The detector is very sensitive, and the amount of radiation is very low. In clastic rock formations, rocks with smaller amounts of radiation are more likely to be coarser-grained and have more pore space, while rocks with higher amounts of radiation are more likely to have finer grains and less pore space.

The second track in the plot records the depth below the reference point, usually the Kelly bush or rotary table in feet, so these rock formations are 11,900 feet below the Earth's surface.

In the third track, the electrical resistivity of the rock is presented. The water in this rock is salty. The electrolytes flowing inside the pore space within the water conduct electricity resulting in lower resistivity of the rock. This also indicates an increased water saturation and decreased hydrocarbon saturation.

The fourth track shows the computed water saturation, both as “total” water (including the water bound to the rock) in magenta and the “effective water” or water that is free to flow in black. Both quantities are given as a fraction of the total pore space.

The fifth track shows the fraction of the total rock that is pore space filled with fluids (i.e. porosity). The display of the pore space is divided into green for oil and blue for movable water. The black line shows the fraction of the pore space, which contains either water or oil that can move or be "produced" (i.e. effective porosity). While the magenta line indicates the toral porosity, meaning that it includes the water that is permanently bound to the rock.

The last track represents the rock lithology divided into sandstone and shale portions. The yellow pattern represents the fraction of the rock (excluding fluids) composed of coarser-grained sandstone. The gray pattern represents the fraction of rock composed of finer-grained, i.e. "shale." The sandstone is the part of the rock that contains the producible hydrocarbons and water.

=== Modelling ===
Reservoir models are built by reservoir engineering in specialised software with the petrophysical dataset elaborated by the petrophysicist to estimate the amount of hydrocarbon present in the reservoir, the rate at which that hydrocarbon can be produced to the Earth's surface through wellbores and the fluid flow in rocks. Similar models in the water resource industry compute how much water can be produced to the surface over long periods without depleting the aquifer.

== Rock volumetric model for shaly sand formation ==
Shaly sand is a term referred to as a mixture of shale or clay and sandstone. Hence, a significant portion of clay minerals and silt-size particles results in a fine-grained sandstone with higher density and rock complexity.

The shale/clay volume is an essential petrophysical parameter to estimate since it contributes to the rock bulk volume, and for correct porosity and water saturation, evaluation needs to be correctly defined. As shown in Figure 2, for modelling clastic rock formation, there are four components whose definitions are typical for shaly or clayey sands that assume: the rock matrix (grains), clay portion that surrounds the grains, water, and hydrocarbons. These two fluids are stored only in pore space in the rock matrix.

Components of a petrophysical model of a water-wet reservoir rock

Due to the complex microstructure, for a water-wet rock, the following terms comprised a clastic reservoir formation:

V_{ma} = volume of matrix grains.

V_{dcl} = volme of dry clay.

V_{cbw} = volume of clay bound water.

V_{cl} = volume of wet clay (V_{dcl} +V_{cbw}).

V_{cap} = volume of capillary bound water.

V_{fw} = volume of free water.

V_{hyd} = volume of hydrocarbon.

Φ_{T} = Total porosity (PHIT), which includes the connected and not connected pore throats.

Φ_{e} = Effective porosity which includes only the inter-connected pore throats.

V_{b} = bulk volume of the rock.

Key equations:

V_{ma} + V_{cl} + V_{fw} + V_{hyd} = 1

Rock matrix volume + wet clay volume + water free volume + hydrocarbon volume = bulk rock volume

== Scholarly societies ==
The Society of Petrophysicists and Well Log Analysts (SPWLA) is an organisation whose mission is to increase the awareness of petrophysics, formation evaluation, and well logging best practices in the oil and gas industry and the scientific community at large.

== See also ==
- Archie's law – Relationship between the electrical conductivity of a rock and its porosity
- Formation evaluation – Production assessment of boreholes drilled for oil or gas
- Gardner's relation – Equation that relates seismic P-wave velocity to the bulk density of the lithology
- Petrology – Study of rocks in geology
