= Environmental impact of fracking =

The environmental impact of fracking is related to land use and water consumption, air emissions, including methane emissions, brine and fracturing fluid leakage, water contamination, noise pollution, and health. Water and air pollution are the biggest risks to human health from fracking. Research has determined that fracking negatively affects human health and drives climate change.

Fracking fluids include proppants and other substances, which include chemicals known to be toxic, as well as unknown chemicals that may be toxic. In the United States, such additives may be treated as trade secrets by companies who use them. Lack of knowledge about specific chemicals has complicated efforts to develop risk management policies and to study health effects. In other jurisdictions, such as the United Kingdom, these chemicals must be made public and their applications are required to be nonhazardous.

Water usage by fracking can be a problem in areas that experience water shortage. Surface water may be contaminated through spillage and improperly built and maintained waste pits, in jurisdictions where these are permitted. Further, ground water can be contaminated if fracturing fluids and formation fluids are able to escape during fracking. However, the possibility of groundwater contamination from the fracturing fluid upward migration is negligible, even in a long-term period. Produced water, the water that returns to the surface after fracking, is managed by underground injection, municipal and commercial wastewater treatment, and reuse in future wells. There is potential for methane to leak into ground water and the air, though escape of methane is a bigger problem in older wells than in those built under more recent legislation.

Fracking causes induced seismicity called microseismic events or microearthquakes. The magnitude of these events is too small to be detected at the surface, being of magnitude M-3 to M-1 usually. However, fluid disposal wells (which are often used in the USA to dispose of polluted waste from several industries) have been responsible for earthquakes up to 5.6M in Oklahoma and other states.

Governments worldwide are developing regulatory frameworks to assess and manage environmental and associated health risks, working under pressure from industry on the one hand, and from anti-fracking groups on the other. In some countries like France a precautionary approach has been favored and fracking has been banned. The United Kingdom's regulatory framework is based on the conclusion that the risks associated with fracking are manageable if carried out under effective regulation and if operational best practices are implemented. It has been suggested by the authors of meta-studies that in order to avoid further negative impacts, greater adherence to regulation and safety procedures are necessary.

== Air emissions ==
A report for the European Union on the potential risks was produced in 2012. Potential risks are "methane emissions from the wells, diesel fumes and other hazardous pollutants, ozone precursors or odours from hydraulic fracturing equipment, such as compressors, pumps, and valves". Also gases and hydraulic fracturing fluids dissolved in flowback water pose air emissions risks. One study measured various air pollutants weekly for a year surrounding the development of a newly fractured gas well and detected nonmethane hydrocarbons, methylene chloride (a toxic solvent), and polycyclic aromatic hydrocarbons. These pollutants have been shown to affect fetal outcomes.

The relationship between hydraulic fracturing and air quality can influence acute and chronic respiratory illnesses, including exacerbation of asthma (induced by airborne particulates, ozone and exhaust from equipment used for drilling and transport) and COPD. For example, communities overlying the Marcellus shale have higher frequencies of asthma. Children, active young adults who spend time outdoors, and the elderly are particularly vulnerable. OSHA has also raised concerns about the long-term respiratory effects of occupational exposure to airborne silica at hydraulic fracturing sites. Silicosis can be associated with systemic autoimmune processes.

"In the UK, all oil and gas operators must minimise the release of gases as a condition of their licence from the Department of Energy and Climate Change (DECC). Natural gas may only be vented for safety reasons."

Also transportation of necessary water volume for hydraulic fracturing, if done by trucks, can cause emissions. Piped water supplies can reduce the number of truck movements necessary.

A report from the Pennsylvania Department of Environmental Protection indicated that there is little potential for radiation exposure from oil and gas operations.

Air pollution is of particular concern to workers at hydraulic fracturing well sites as the chemical emissions from storage tanks and open flowback pits combine with the geographically compounded air concentrations from surrounding wells. Thirty seven percent of the chemicals used in hydraulic fracturing operations are volatile and can become airborne.

Researchers Chen and Carter from the Department of Civil and Environmental Engineering, University of Tennessee, Knoxville used atmospheric dispersion models (AERMOD) to estimate the potential exposure concentration of emissions for calculated radial distances of 5 m to 180m from emission sources. The team examined emissions from 60,644 hydraulic fracturing wells and found "results showed the percentage of wells and their potential acute non-cancer, chronic non-cancer, acute cancer, and chronic cancer risks for exposure to workers were 12.41%, 0.11%, 7.53%, and 5.80%, respectively. Acute and chronic cancer risks were dominated by emissions from the chemical storage tanks within a 20 m radius.

=== Climate change ===
Hydraulic fracturing is a driver of climate change. However, whether natural gas produced by hydraulic fracturing causes higher well-to-burner emissions than gas produced from conventional wells is a matter of contention. Some studies have found that hydraulic fracturing has higher emissions due to methane released during completing wells as some gas returns to the surface, together with the fracturing fluids. Depending on their treatment, the well-to-burner emissions are 3.5%–12% higher than for conventional gas.

A debate has arisen particularly around a study by professor Robert W. Howarth finding shale gas significantly worse for global warming than oil or coal. Other researchers have criticized Howarth's analysis, including Cathles et al., whose estimates were substantially lower." A 2012 industry funded report co-authored by researchers at the United States Department of Energy's National Renewable Energy Laboratory found emissions from shale gas, when burned for electricity, were "very similar" to those from so-called "conventional well" natural gas, and less than half the emissions of coal.

Studies which have estimated lifecycle methane leakage from natural gas development and production have found a wide range of leakage rates. According to the Environmental Protection Agency's Greenhouse Gas Inventory, the methane leakage rate is about 1.4%. A 16-part assessment of methane leakage from natural gas production initiated by the Environmental Defense Fund found that fugitive emissions in key stages of the natural gas production process are significantly higher than estimates in the EPA's national emission inventory, with a leakage rate of 2.3 percent of overall natural gas output.

== Water consumption ==
Massive hydraulic fracturing typical of shale wells uses between 1.2 and 3.5 million US gallons (4,500 and 13,200 m^{3}) of water per well, with large projects using up to 5 million US gallons (19,000 m^{3}). Additional water is used when wells are refractured. An average well requires 3 to 8 million US gallons (11,000 to 30,000 m^{3}) of water over its lifetime. According to the Oxford Institute for Energy Studies, greater volumes of fracturing fluids are required in Europe, where the shale depths average 1.5 times greater than in the U.S. Whilst the published amounts may seem large, they are small in comparison with the overall water usage in most areas. A study in Texas, which is a water shortage area, indicates "Water use for shale gas is <1% of statewide water withdrawals; however, local impacts vary with water availability and competing demands."

A report by the Royal Society and the Royal Academy of Engineering shows the usage expected for hydraulic fracturing a well is approximately the amount needed to run a 1,000 MW coal-fired power plant for 12 hours. A 2011 report from the Tyndall Centre estimates that to support a 9 billion cubic metres per annum (320×10^{9} cu ft/a) gas production industry, between 1.25 to 1.65 million cubic metres (44×10^{6} to 58×10^{6} cu ft) would be needed annually, which amounts to 0.01% of the total water abstraction nationally.

Concern has been raised over the increasing quantities of water for hydraulic fracturing in areas that experience water stress. Use of water for hydraulic fracturing can divert water from stream flow, water supplies for municipalities and industries such as power generation, as well as recreation and aquatic life. The large volumes of water required for most common hydraulic fracturing methods have raised concerns for arid regions, such as the Karoo in South Africa, and in drought-prone Texas, in North America. It may also require water overland piping from distant sources.

A 2014 life cycle analysis of natural gas electricity by the National Renewable Energy Laboratory concluded that electricity generated by natural gas from massive hydraulically fractured wells consumed between 249 gallons per megawatt-hour (gal/MWhr) (Marcellus trend) and 272 gal/MWhr (Barnett Shale). The water consumption for the gas from massive hydraulic fractured wells was from 52 to 75 gal/MWhr greater (26 percent to 38 percent greater) than the 197 gal/MWhr consumed for electricity from conventional onshore natural gas.

Some producers have developed hydraulic fracturing techniques that could reduce the need for water. Using carbon dioxide, liquid propane or other gases instead of water have been proposed to reduce water consumption. After it is used, the propane returns to its gaseous state and can be collected and reused. In addition to water savings, gas fracturing reportedly produces less damage to rock formations that can impede production. Recycled flowback water can be reused in hydraulic fracturing. It lowers the total amount of water used and reduces the need to dispose of wastewater after use. The technique is relatively expensive, however, since the water must be treated before each reuse and it can shorten the life of some types of equipment.

== Water contamination ==
=== Injected fluid ===
In the United States, hydraulic fracturing fluids include proppants, radionuclide tracers, and other chemicals, many of which are toxic. The type of chemicals used in hydraulic fracturing and their properties vary. While most of them are common and generally harmless, some chemicals are carcinogenic. Out of 2,500 products used as hydraulic fracturing additives in the United States, 652 contained one or more of 29 chemical compounds which are either known or possible human carcinogens, regulated under the Safe Drinking Water Act for their risks to human health, or listed as hazardous air pollutants under the Clean Air Act. Another 2011 study identified 632 chemicals used in United States natural gas operations, of which only 353 are well-described in the scientific literature. A study that assessed health effects of chemicals used in fracturing found that 73% of the products had between 6 and 14 different adverse health effects including skin, eye, and sensory organ damage; respiratory distress including asthma; gastrointestinal and liver disease; brain and nervous system harms; cancers; and negative reproductive effects.

An expansive study conducted by the Yale School of Public Health in 2016 found numerous chemicals involved in or released by hydraulic fracturing are carcinogenic. Of the 119 compounds identified in this study with sufficient data, "44% of the water pollutants...were either confirmed or possible carcinogens." However, the majority of chemicals lacked sufficient data on carcinogenic potential, highlighting the knowledge gap in this area. Further research is needed to identify both carcinogenic potential of chemicals used in hydraulic fracturing and their cancer risk.

The European Union regulatory regime requires full disclosure of all additives. According to the EU groundwater directive of 2006, "in order to protect the environment as a whole, and human health in particular, detrimental concentrations of harmful pollutants in groundwater must be avoided, prevented or reduced." In the United Kingdom, only chemicals that are "non hazardous in their application" are licensed by the Environment Agency.

=== Flowback ===
Less than half of injected water is recovered as flowback or later production brine, and in many cases recovery is <30%. As the fracturing fluid flows back through the well, it consists of spent fluids and may contain dissolved constituents such as minerals and brine waters. In some cases, depending on the geology of the formation, it may contain uranium, radium, radon and thorium. Estimates of the amount of injected fluid returning to the surface range from 15-20% to 30–70%.

Approaches to managing these fluids, commonly known as produced water, include underground injection, municipal and commercial wastewater treatment and discharge, self-contained systems at well sites or fields, and recycling to fracture future wells. The vacuum multi-effect membrane distillation system as a more effective treatment system has been proposed for treatment of flowback. However, the quantity of waste water needing treatment and the improper configuration of sewage plants have become an issue in some regions of the United States. Part of the wastewater from hydraulic fracturing operations is processed there by public sewage treatment plants, which are not equipped to remove radioactive material and are not required to test for it.

Produced water spills and subsequent contamination of groundwater also presents a risk for exposure to carcinogens. Research that modeled the solute transport of BTEX (benzene, toluene, ethylbenzene, and xylene) and naphthalene for a range of spill sizes on contrasting soils overlying groundwater at different depths found that benzene and toluene were expected to reach human health relevant concentration in groundwater because of their high concentrations in produced water, relatively low solid/liquid partition coefficient and low EPA drinking water limits for these contaminants. Benzene is a known carcinogen which affects the central nervous system in the short term and can affect the bone marrow, blood production, immune system, and urogenital systems with long term exposure.

=== Surface spills ===
Surface spills related to the hydraulic fracturing occur mainly because of equipment failure or engineering misjudgments.

Volatile chemicals held in waste water evaporation ponds can evaporate into the atmosphere, or overflow. The runoff can also end up in groundwater systems. Groundwater may become contaminated by trucks carrying hydraulic fracturing chemicals and wastewater if they are involved in accidents on the way to hydraulic fracturing sites or disposal destinations.

In the evolving European Union legislation, it is required that "Member States should ensure that the installation is constructed in a way that prevents possible surface leaks and spills to soil, water or air." Evaporation and open ponds are not permitted. Regulations call for all pollution pathways to be identified and mitigated. The use of chemical proof drilling pads to contain chemical spills is required. In the UK, total gas security is required, and venting of methane is only permitted in an emergency.

=== Methane ===
In September 2014, a study from the US Proceedings of the National Academy of Sciences released a report that indicated that methane contamination can be correlated to distance from a well in wells that were known to leak. This however was not caused by the hydraulic fracturing process, but by poor cementation of casings.

Groundwater methane contamination has adverse effect on water quality and in extreme cases may lead to potential explosion. A scientific study conducted by researchers of Duke University found high correlations of gas well drilling activities, including hydraulic fracturing, and methane pollution of the drinking water. According to the 2011 study of the MIT Energy Initiative, "there is evidence of natural gas (methane) migration into freshwater zones in some areas, most likely as a result of substandard well completion practices i.e. poor quality cementing job or bad casing, by a few operators." A 2013 Duke study suggested that either faulty construction (defective cement seals in the upper part of wells, and faulty steel linings within deeper layers) combined with a peculiarity of local geology may be allowing methane to seep into waters; the latter cause may also release injected fluids to the aquifer. Abandoned gas and oil wells also provide conduits to the surface in areas like Pennsylvania, where these are common.

A study by Cabot Oil & Gas examined the Duke study using a larger sample size, found that methane concentrations were related to topography, with the highest readings found in low-lying areas, rather than related to distance from gas production areas. Using a more precise isotopic analysis, they showed that the methane found in the water wells came from both the formations where hydraulic fracturing occurred, and from the shallower formations. The Colorado Oil & Gas Conservation Commission investigates complaints from water well owners, and has found some wells to contain biogenic methane unrelated to oil and gas wells, but others that have thermogenic methane due to oil and gas wells with leaking well casing. A review published in February 2012 found no direct evidence that hydraulic fracturing actual injection phase resulted in contamination of ground water, and suggests that reported problems occur due to leaks in its fluid or waste storage apparatus; the review says that methane in water wells in some areas probably comes from natural resources.

Another 2013 review found that hydraulic fracturing technologies are not free from risk of contaminating groundwater, and described the controversy over whether the methane that has been detected in private groundwater wells near hydraulic fracturing sites has been caused by drilling or by natural processes.

== Radionuclides ==
There are naturally occurring radioactive materials (NORM), for example radium, radon, uranium, and thorium, in shale deposits. Brine co-produced and brought to the surface along with the oil and gas sometimes contains naturally occurring radioactive materials; brine from many shale gas wells, contains these radioactive materials. The U.S. Environmental Protection Agency and regulators in North Dakota consider radioactive material in flowback a potential hazard to workers at hydraulic fracturing drilling and waste disposal sites and those living or working nearby if the correct procedures are not followed. A report from the Pennsylvania Department of Environmental Protection indicated that there is little potential for radiation exposure from oil and gas operations.

== Land use ==
In the UK, the likely well spacing visualised by the December 2013 DECC Strategic Environmental Assessment report indicated that well pad spacings of 5 km were likely in crowded areas, with up to 3 hectares (7.4 acres) per well pad. Each pad could have 24 separate wells. This amounts to 0.16% of land area. A study published in 2015 on the Fayetteville Shale found that a mature gas field impacted about 2% of the land area and substantially increased edge habitat creation. Average land impact per well was 3 hectares (about 7 acres) In another case study for a watershed in Ohio, lands disturbed over 20 years amount to 9.7% of the watershed area, with only 0.24% attributed to fracking wellpad construction. Research indicates that effects on ecosystem services costs (i.e. those processes that the natural world provides to humanity) has reached over $250 million per year in the U.S.

== Seismicity ==
Hydraulic fracturing causes induced seismicity called microseismic events or microearthquakes. These microseismic events are often used to map the horizontal and vertical extent of the fracturing. The magnitude of these events is usually too small to be detected at the surface, although the biggest micro-earthquakes may have the magnitude of about -1.5 (M_{w}).

=== Induced seismicity from hydraulic fracturing ===
As of August 2016, there were at least nine known cases of fault reactivation by hydraulic fracturing that caused induced seismicity strong enough to be felt by humans at the surface: In Canada, there have been three in Alberta (M 4.8 and M 4.4 and M 4.4) and three in British Columbia (M 4.6, M 4.4 and M 3.8); In the United States there has been: one in Oklahoma (M 2.8) and one in Ohio (M 3.0), and; In the United Kingdom, there have been two in Lancashire (M 2.3 and M 1.5).

=== Induced seismicity from water disposal wells ===
According to the USGS only a small fraction of roughly 30,000 waste fluid disposal wells for oil and gas operations in the United States have induced earthquakes that are large enough to be of concern to the public. Although the magnitudes of these quakes has been small, the USGS says that there is no guarantee that larger quakes will not occur. In addition, the frequency of the quakes has been increasing. In 2009, there were 50 earthquakes greater than magnitude 3.0 in the area spanning Alabama and Montana, and there were 87 quakes in 2010. In 2011 there were 134 earthquakes in the same area, a sixfold increase over 20th century levels. There are also concerns that quakes may damage underground gas, oil, and water lines and wells that were not designed to withstand earthquakes.

A 2012 US Geological Survey study reported that a "remarkable" increase in the rate of M ≥ 3 earthquakes in the US midcontinent "is currently in progress", having started in 2001 and culminating in a 6-fold increase over 20th century levels in 2011. The overall increase was tied to earthquake increases in a few specific areas: the Raton Basin of southern Colorado (site of coalbed methane activity), and gas-producing areas in central and southern Oklahoma, and central Arkansas. While analysis suggested that the increase is "almost certainly man-made", the USGS noted: "USGS's studies suggest that the actual hydraulic fracturing process is only very rarely the direct cause of felt earthquakes." The increased earthquakes were said to be most likely caused by increased injection of gas-well wastewater into disposal wells. The injection of waste water from oil and gas operations, including from hydraulic fracturing, into saltwater disposal wells may cause bigger low-magnitude tremors, being registered up to 3.3 (M_{w}).

== Noise ==
Each well pad (in average 10 wells per pad) needs during preparatory and hydraulic fracturing process about 800 to 2,500 days of activity, which may affect residents. In addition, noise is created by transport related to the hydraulic fracturing activities. Noise pollution from hydraulic fracturing operations (e.g., traffic, flares/burn-offs) is often cited as a source of psychological distress, as well as poor academic performance in children. For example, the low-frequency noise that comes from well pumps contributes to irritation, unease, and fatigue.

The UK Onshore Oil and Gas (UKOOG) is the industry representative body, and it has published a charter that shows how noise concerns will be mitigated, using sound insulation, and heavily silenced rigs where this is needed.

== Safety issues ==
In July 2013, the United States Federal Railroad Administration listed oil contamination by hydraulic fracturing chemicals as "a possible cause" of corrosion in oil tank cars.

== Community impacts ==
Impacted communities are often already vulnerable, including poor, rural, or indigenous persons, who may continue to experience the deleterious effects of hydraulic fracturing for generations. Facility siting in fracking projects disproportionately tilts towards lower income communities, a persisting issue partially due to these disadvantaged residents not having the resources to evade environmental hazards. A spatial analysis of the demographics of residents around fracking sites found that median incomes around wells in Pennsylvania were substantially lower. Competition for resources between farmers and oil companies contributes to stress for agricultural workers and their families, as well as to a community-level "us versus them" mentality that creates community distress. Rural communities that host hydraulic fracturing operations often experience a "boom/bust cycle," whereby their population surges, consequently exerting stress on community infrastructure and service provision capabilities (e.g., medical care, law enforcement). A study of rural communities around fracking sites in Pennsylvania found that while there was some local support of fracking as a source of jobs and a boost to small businesses, there was more skepticism of if these jobs would stay within the community at all, and if there would be a significant 'bust' to the economy after the natural gas dried up.

Indigenous and agricultural communities may be particularly impacted by hydraulic fracturing, given their historical attachment to, and dependency on, the land they live on, which is often damaged as a result of the hydraulic fracturing process. Native Americans are especially vulnerable to the negative environmental impacts of fracking operations, in part due to existing legislature surrounding fracking wastewater and environmental pollutants on indigenous lands. The Resource Conservation and Recovery Act (RCRA) has a special exemption preventing indigenous groups from protecting their water sources with quality standards. Native Americans, particularly those living on rural reservations, may be particularly vulnerable to the effects of fracturing; that is, on the one hand, tribes may be tempted to engage with the oil companies to secure a source of income but, on the other hand, must often engage in legal battles to protect their sovereign rights and the natural resources of their land.

While hydraulic fracturing is primarily recognized for its impacts on the natural environment, it also can provide stressors on a community's mental state. Research suggests that the activity surrounding fracking operations leads to a degree of degradation in 'socio-psychological functioning' of surrounding community members. In an attempt to support findings from the existing literature, one study performed a series of interviews with residents of Denton, Texas to get a community's personalized testimony. These discussions found that residents experienced heightened stress, anxiety, and hopelessness, as well as feeling a 'lack of control' over their community. Researchers also uncovered polarizing attitudes, a communal rift forming between those with pro and anti fracking beliefs.

== Policy and science ==
There are two main approaches to regulation that derive from policy debates about how to manage risk and a corresponding debate about how to assess risk.

The two main schools of regulation are science-based assessment of risk and the taking of measures to prevent harm from those risks through an approach like hazard analysis, and the precautionary principle, where action is taken before risks are well-identified. The relevance and reliability of risk assessments in communities where hydraulic fracturing occurs has also been debated amongst environmental groups, health scientists, and industry leaders. The risks, to some, are overplayed and the current research is insufficient in showing the link between hydraulic fracturing and adverse health effects, while to others the risks are obvious and risk assessment is underfunded.

Different regulatory approaches have thus emerged. In France and Vermont for instance, a precautionary approach has been favored and hydraulic fracturing has been banned based on two principles: the precautionary principle and the prevention principle. Nevertheless, some States such as the U.S. have adopted a risk assessment approach, which had led to many regulatory debates over the issue of hydraulic fracturing and its risks.

In the UK, the regulatory framework is largely being shaped by a report commissioned by the UK Government in 2012, whose purpose was to identify the problems around hydraulic fracturing and to advise the country's regulatory agencies. Jointly published by the Royal Society and the Royal Academy of Engineering, under the chairmanship of Professor Robert Mair, the report features ten recommendations covering issues such as groundwater contamination, well integrity, seismic risk, gas leakages, water management, environmental risks, best practice for risk management, and also includes advice for regulators and research councils. The report was notable for stating that the risks associated with hydraulic fracturing are manageable if carried out under effective regulation and if operational best practices are implemented.

A 2013 review concluded that, in the US, confidentiality requirements dictated by legal investigations have impeded peer-reviewed research into environmental impacts.

When looking at the regulations of fracking from the perspective of land rights, historic and continuing injustices against Native Americans are one angle to consider. Some legislature, such as the National Environmental Policy Act (NEPA), is written in a way that it only protects indigenous 'cultural resources' on specifically allocated tribal lands. This allows historically marginalizing policies of land allocation by the United States government to continue to determine harmful land use practices in Native American communities. For example, the Greater Chaco Canyon region, which spans across Arizona, Colorado, New Mexico, and Utah, is home to ancient Puebloan architecture, extremely significant grounds to descendant indigenous groups. Most of these lands, however, are controlled by the United States Forest Service (USFS) and the Bureau of Land Management (BLM), leaving them vulnerable to development from the oil sector. These organizations, particularly the BLM, have a recent history of allowing oil companies to exploit the resources beneath federal lands.

One significant roadblock to meaningful fracking legislation lies in the industry being relegated as a state-level decision. Without federal oversight, the Safe Drinking Water Act (SDWA), the Resource Conservation and Recovery Act (RCRA), the Clean Water Act (CWA), and the Comprehensive Environmental Response, Compensation, and Liability Act (CERCLA) omit fracking activity from their respective languages.

There are numerous scientific limitations to the study of the environmental impact of hydraulic fracturing. The main limitation is the difficulty in developing effective monitoring procedures and protocols, for which there are several main reasons:

- Variability among fracturing sites in terms of ecosystems, operation sizes, pad densities, and quality-control measures makes it difficult to develop a standard protocol for monitoring.
- As more fracturing sites develop, the chance for interaction between sites increases, greatly compounding the effects and making monitoring of one site difficult to control. These cumulative effects can be difficult to measure, as many of the impacts develop very slowly.
- Due to the vast number of chemicals involved in hydraulic fracturing, developing baseline data is challenging. In addition, there is a lack of research on the interaction of the chemicals used in hydraulic fracturing fluid and the fate of the individual components.

== See also ==
- Unconventional (oil & gas) reservoir
- Balcombe drilling protest
- Cuadrilla Resources
- Directional drilling
- Environmental concerns with electricity generation
- Environmental impact of the petroleum industry
- Environmental impact of the oil shale industry
- 2012–14 Romanian protests against shale gas

== Bibliography ==
- Broomfield, Mark (10 August 2012). Support to the identification of potential risks for the environment and human health arising from hydrocarbons operations involving hydraulic fracturing in Europe (PDF) (Report). European Commission. pp. vi–xvi. ED57281.
- Brown, Valerie J. (February 2007). "Industry Issues: Putting the Heat on Gas". Environmental Health Perspectives. 115 (2): A76. doi:10.1289/ehp.115-a76 (inactive 7 January 2026). PMC 1817691. PMID 17384744.
- Ground Water Protection Council; ALL Consulting (April 2009). Modern Shale Gas Development in the United States: A Primer (PDF) (Report). DOE Office of Fossil Energy and National Energy Technology Laboratory. pp. 56–66. DE-FG26-04NT15455.
- Healy, Dave (July 2012). Hydraulic Fracturing or 'Fracking': A Short Summary of Current Knowledge and Potential Environmental Impacts (PDF) (Report). Environmental Protection Agency.
- Jenner, Steffen; Lamadrid, Alberto J. (2013). "Shale gas vs. coal: Policy implications from environmental impact comparisons of shale gas, conventional gas, and coal on air, water, and land in the United States" (PDF). Energy Policy. 53 (53): 442–453. Bibcode:2013EnPol..53..442J. doi:10.1016/j.enpol.2012.11.010. Archived from the original (PDF) on 19 October 2014.
- Mair (Chair), Robert (June 2012). Shale gas extraction in the UK: A review of hydraulic fracturing (PDF) (Report). The Royal Society and the Royal Academy of Engineering.
- Moniz (chair), Ernest J.; Jacoby (Co-Chair), Henry D.; Meggs (Co-Chair), Anthony J. M. (June 2011). The future of natural gas: An interdisciplinary MIT study (PDF). Massachusetts Institute of Technology. Archived from the original (PDF) on 12 March 2013.
- Zoback, Mark; Kitasei, Saya; Copithorne, Brad (July 2010). Addressing the Environmental Risks from Shale Gas Development (PDF) (Report). Worldwatch Institute. p. 9. Archived from the original (PDF) on 21 May 2018.
