= Uses of radioactivity in oil and gas wells =

Radioactive sources are used for logging formation parameters. Radioactive tracers, along with the other substances in hydraulic-fracturing fluid, are sometimes used to determine the injection profile and location of fractures created by hydraulic fracturing.

== Use of radioactive sources for logging ==
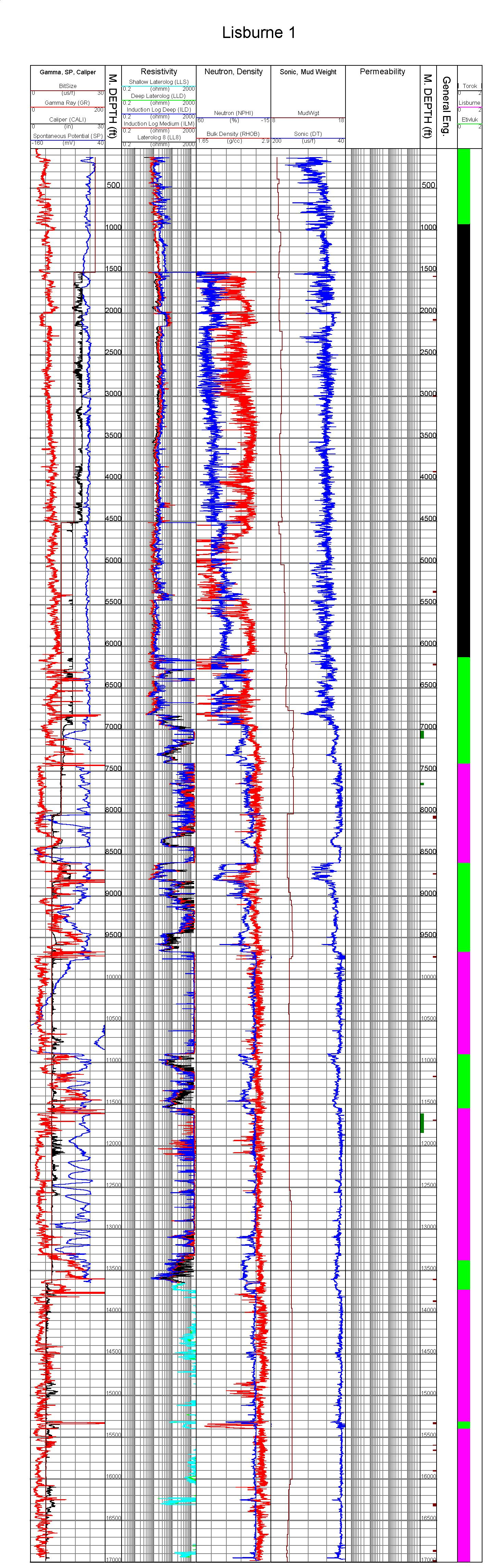
Composite wireline log for the Lisburne 1 well, Alaska - the neutron and density logs used radioactive sources

Sealed radioactive sources are routinely used in formation evaluation of both hydraulically fractured and non-fracked wells. The sources are lowered into the borehole as part of the well logging tools, and are removed from the borehole before any hydraulic fracturing takes place. Measurement of formation density is made using a sealed caesium-137 source. This bombards the formation with high energy gamma rays. The attenuation of these gamma rays gives an accurate measure of formation density; this has been a standard oilfield tool since 1965. Another source is americium berylium (Am-Be) neutron source used in evaluation of the porosity of the formation, and this has been used since 1950. In a drilling context, these sources are used by trained personnel, and radiation exposure of those personnel is monitored. Usage is covered by licenses from International Atomic Energy Agency (IAEA) guidelines, SU or European Union protocols, and the Environment Agency in the UK. Licenses are required for access, transport, and use of radioactive sources. These sources are very large, and the potential for their use in a 'dirty bomb' means security issues are considered as important. There is no risk to the public, or to water supplies under normal usage. They are transported to a well site in shielded containers, which means exposure to the public is very low, much lower than the background radiation dose in one day.

== Radiotracers and markers ==
The oil and gas industry in general uses unsealed radioactive solids (powder and granular forms), liquids and gases to investigate or trace the movement of materials. The most common use of these radiotracers is at the well head for the measurement of flow rate for various purposes. A 1995 study found that radioactive tracers were used in over 15% of stimulated oil and gas wells.

Use of these radioactive tracers is strictly controlled. It is recommended that the radiotracer is chosen to have readily detectable radiation, appropriate chemical properties, and a half-life and toxicity level that will minimize initial and residual contamination. Operators are to ensure that licensed material will be used, transported, stored, and disposed of in such a way that members of the public will not receive more than 1 mSv (100 mrem) in one year, and the dose in any unrestricted area will not exceed 0.02 mSv (2 mrem) in any one hour. They are required to secure stored licensed material from access, removal, or use by unauthorized personnel and control and maintain constant surveillance of licensed material when in use and not in storage. Federal and state nuclear regulatory agencies keep records of the radionuclides used.

As of 2003 the isotopes Antimony-124, argon-41, cobalt-60, iodine-131, iridium-192, lanthanum-140, manganese-56, scandium-46, sodium-24, silver-110m, technetium-99m, and xenon-133 were most commonly used by the oil and gas industry because they are easily identified and measured. Bromine-82, Carbon-14, hydrogen-3, iodine-125 are also used.

Examples of amounts used are:

Nuclide	Form	Activity
Iodine-131	Gas	100 millicuries (3.7 GBq) total, not to exceed 20 mCi (0.74 GBq) per injection
Iodine-131	Liquid	50 millicuries (1.9 GBq) total, not to exceed 10 mCi (0.37 GBq) per injection
Iridium-192	"Labeled" frac sand	200 millicuries (7.4 GBq) total, not to exceed 15 mCi (0.56 GBq) per injection
Silver-110m	Liquid	200 millicuries (7.4 GBq) total, not to exceed 10 mCi (0.37 GBq) per injection

In hydraulic fracturing, plastic pellets coated with Silver-110m or sand labelled with Iridium-192with may be added to a proppant when it is required to evaluate whether a fracturing process has penetrated rocks in the pay zone. Some radioactivity may by brought to the surface at the well head during testing to determine the injection profile and location of fractures. Typically this uses very small (50 kBq) Cobalt-60 sources and dilution factors are such that the activity concentrations will be very low in the topside plant and equipment.

== Regulation in the US ==
The NRC and approved state agencies regulate the use of injected radionuclides in hydraulic fracturing in the United States.

The US EPA sets radioactivity standards for drinking water. Federal and state regulators do not require sewage treatment plants that accept gas well wastewater to test for radioactivity. In Pennsylvania, where the hydraulic fracturing drilling boom began in 2008, most drinking-water intake plants downstream from those sewage treatment plants have not tested for radioactivity since before 2006. The EPA has asked the Pennsylvania Department of Environmental Protection to require community water systems in certain locations, and centralized wastewater treatment facilities to conduct testing for radionuclides.

== See also ==
- List of additives for hydraulic fracturing
- Hydraulic fracturing proppants
