= Regulation of fracking =

Countries using or considering to use fracking have implemented different regulations, including developing federal and regional legislation, and local zoning limitations. In 2011, after public pressure France became the first nation to ban hydraulic fracturing, based on the precautionary principle as well as the principal of preventive and corrective action of environmental hazards. The ban was upheld by an October 2013 ruling of the Constitutional Council. Some other countries have placed a temporary moratorium on the practice. Countries like the United Kingdom and South Africa, have lifted their bans, choosing to focus on regulation instead of outright prohibition. Germany has announced draft regulations that would allow using hydraulic fracturing for the exploitation of shale gas deposits with the exception of wetland areas.

The European Union has adopted a recommendation for minimum principles for using high-volume hydraulic fracturing. Its regulatory regime requires full disclosure of all additives. In the United States, the Ground Water Protection Council launched FracFocus.org, an online voluntary disclosure database for hydraulic fracturing fluids funded by oil and gas trade groups and the U.S. Department of Energy. Hydraulic fracturing is excluded from the Safe Drinking Water Act's underground injection control's regulation, except when diesel fuel is used. The EPA assures surveillance of the issuance of drilling permits when diesel fuel is employed.

On 17 December 2014, New York state issued a statewide ban on hydraulic fracturing, becoming the second state in the United States to issue such a ban after Vermont.

== Definitions ==
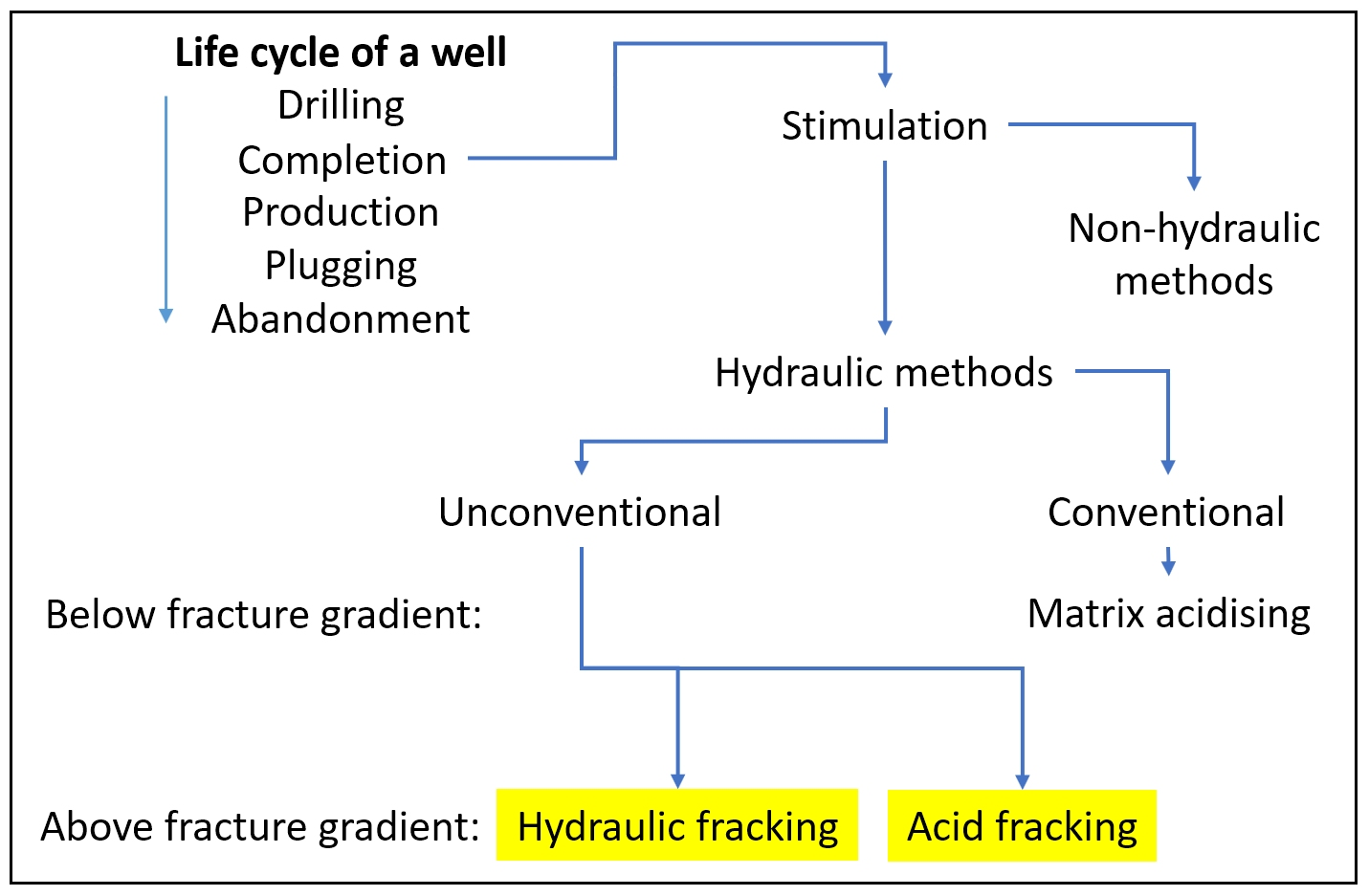
Well stimulation methods. Fracking is highlighted in yellow.

Regulation of fracking presupposes that 'fracking' is defined a priori. Well stimulation is a broad term used to describe the various techniques and well interventions that can be used to restore or enhance the production of hydrocarbons from an oil well, or energy from a geothermal well.

Hydraulic fracturing (fracking) and acidising are two of the most common methods for well stimulation. The flow chart shows that hydraulic fracking and acid fracking, highlighted in yellow, are two categories of unconventional hydraulic methods. But acidising is complicated by the fact that matrix acidising is considered conventional. Note that it takes place below the fracture gradient of the rock.

In the UK legislative and hydrocarbon permitting context (see Fracking in the United Kingdom), Adriana Zalucka et al. have reviewed the various definitions, as well as the role of key regulators and authorities, in a peer-reviewed article published in 2021.

Zalucka et al. conclude that the UK legislation concerning the legal definitions was, and remains, confusing, ambiguous, incomplete, self-contradictory, and full of legal loopholes. To solve this problem they have proposed a new robust definition for unconventional well treatments:

All well stimulation treatments of oil and gas wells which increase the permeability of the target rock volume to higher than 0.1 millidarcies beyond a 1 m radius from the borehole.

The above definition focuses on increasing permeability, rather than on any particular extraction process. It is quantitative, using the generally agreed 0.1 md cut-off value, below which rocks are considered impermeable. It exempts borehole cleaning processes like acid squeeze or acid wash from being classed as unconventional, by using the 1 m radius criterion. It avoids a definition based on, for example, the quantity of water injected, which is controversial, or the injection pressure applied (whether the treatment is above or below the fracture gradient, as shown in the flow chart above). It also exempts non-hydrocarbon wells from being classed as unconventional.

The definition takes into account the views of the hydrocarbon industry and the US Geological Survey, in particular. A low permeability (by consensus defined as less than 0.1 millidarcies) implies that the resource is unconventional, meaning that it requires special methods to extract the resource. Above that value, conventional methods suffice. Unconventional resources are also characterised by being widely distributed, with low energy density (i.e. in a low concentration) and ill-defined in volume. There are no discrete boundaries, in contrast to those bounding a conventional hydrocarbon reservoir.

== Approaches ==
=== Risk-based approach ===
The main tool used by this approach is risk assessment. A risk assessment method, based on experimenting and assessing risk ex-post, once the technology is in place. In the context of hydraulic fracturing, it means that drilling permits are issued and exploitation conducted before the potential risks on the environment and human health are known. The risk-based approach mainly relies on a discourse that sacralizes technological innovations as an intrinsic good, and the analysis of such innovations, such as hydraulic fracturing, is made on a sole cost-benefit framework, which does not allow prevention or ex-ante debates on the use of the technology. This is also referred to as "learning-by-doing". A risk assessment method has for instance led to regulations that exist in the hydraulic fracturing in the United States (EPA will release its study on the effect of hydraulic fracturing on groundwater in 2014, though hydraulic fracturing has been used for more than 60 years. Commissions that have been implemented in the US to regulate the use of hydraulic fracturing have been created after hydraulic fracturing had started in their area of regulation. This is for instance the case in the Marcellus shale area where three regulatory committees were implemented ex-post.

Academic scholars who have studied the perception of hydraulic fracturing in the North of England have raised two main critiques of this approach. Firstly, it takes scientific issues out of the public debate since there is no debate on the use of a technology but on its effects. Secondly, it does not prevent environmental harm from happening since risks are taken then assessed instead of evaluated then taken as it would be the case with a precautionary approach to scientific debates. The relevance and reliability of risk assessments in hydraulic fracturing communities has also been debated amongst environmental groups, health scientists, and industry leaders. A study has epitomized this point: the participants to regulatory committees of the Marcellus shale have, for a majority, raised concerns about public health although nobody in these regulatory committees had expertise in public health. That highlights a possible underestimation of public health risks due to hydraulic fracturing. Moreover, more than a quarter of the participants raised concerns about the neutrality of the regulatory committees given the important weigh of the hydraulic fracturing industry. The risks, to some like the participants of the Marcellus Shale regulatory committees, are overplayed and the current research is insufficient in showing the link between hydraulic fracturing and adverse health effects, while to others like local environmental groups the risks are obvious and risk assessment is underfunded.

=== Precaution-based approach ===
The second approach relies on the precautionary principle and the principal of preventive and corrective action of environmental hazards, using the best available techniques with an acceptable economic cost to insure the protection, the valuation, the restoration, management of spaces, resources and natural environments, of animal and vegetal species, of ecological diversity and equilibriums. The precautionary approach has led to regulations as implemented in France and in Vermont, banning hydraulic fracturing.

Such an approach is called upon by social sciences and the public as studies have shown in the North of England and Australia. Indeed, in Australia, the anthropologist who studied the use of hydraulic fracturing concluded that the risk-based approach was closing down the debate on the ethics of such a practice, therefore avoiding questions on broader concerns that merely the risks implied by hydraulic fracturing. In the North of England, levels of concerns registered in the deliberative focus groups studied were higher regarding the framing of the debate, meaning the fact that people did not have a voice in the energetic choices that were made, including the use of hydraulic fracturing. Concerns relative to risks of seismicity and health issues were also important to the public, but less than this. A reason for that is that being withdrawn the right to participate in the decision-making triggered opposition of both supporters and opponents of hydraulic fracturing.

The points made to defend such an approach often relate to climate change and the impact on the direct environment; related to public concerns on the rural landscape for instance in the UK. Energetic choices indeed affect climate change since greenhouse gas emissions from fossil fuels extraction such as shale gas and oil contribute to climate change. Therefore, people have in the UK raised concerns about the exploitation of these resources, not just hydraulic fracturing as a method. They would hence prefer a precaution-based approach to decide whether or not, regarding the issue of climate change, they want to exploit shale gas and oil.

== Framing of the debate ==
There are two main areas of interest regarding how debates on hydraulic fracturing for the exploitation of unconventional oil and gas have been conducted.

=== "Learning-by-doing" and the displacement of ethics ===
A risk-based approach is often referred to as "learning-by-doing" by social sciences. Social sciences have raised two main critiques of this approach. Firstly, it takes scientific issues out of the public debate since there is no debate on the use of a technology but on its impacts. Secondly, it does not prevent environmental harm from happening since risks are taken then assessed instead of evaluated then taken. Public concerns are shown to be really linked to these issues of scientific approach. Indeed, the public in the North of England for instance fears "the denial of the deliberation of the values embedded in the development and application of that technology, as well as the future it is working towards" more than risks themselves. The legitimacy of the method is only questioned after its implementation, not before. This vision separates risks and effects from the values entitled by a technology. For instance, hydraulic fracturing entitles a transitional fuel for its supporters whereas for its opponents it represents a fossil fuel exacerbating the greenhouse effect and global warming. Not asking these questions leads to seeing only the mere economic cost-benefit analysis.

This is linked to a pattern of preventing non-experts from taking part in scientific-technological debates, including their ethical issues. An answer to that problem is seen to be increased public participation so as to have the public deciding which issues to address and what political and ethical norms to adopt as a society. Another public concern with the "learning-by-doing" approach is that the speed of innovation may exceed the speed of regulation and since innovation is seen as serving private interests, potentially at the expense of social good, it is a matter of public concern. Science and Technology Studies have theorized "slowing-down" and the precautionary principle as answers. The claim is that the possibility of an issue is legitimate and should be taken into account before any action is taken.

=== Variations in risk-assessment of environmental effects of hydraulic fracturing ===
Issues also exist regarding the way risk assessment is conducted and whether it reflects some interests more than others. Firstly, an issue exists about whether risk assessment authorities are able to judge the impact of hydraulic fracturing in public health. A study conducted on the advisory committees of the Marcellus Shale gas area has shown that not a single member of these committees had public health expertise and that some concern existed about whether the commissions were not biased in their composition. Indeed, among 51 members of the committees, there is no evidence that a single one has any expertise in environmental public health, even after enlarging the category of experts to "include medical and health professionals who could be presumed to have some health background related to environmental health, however minimal". This cannot be explained by the purpose of the committee since all three executive orders of the different committees mentioned environmental public health related issues. Another finding of the authors is that a quarter of the opposed comments mentioned the possibility of bias in favor of gas industries in the composition of committees. The authors conclude saying that political leaders may not want to raise public health concerns not to handicap further economic development due to hydraulic fracturing.

Secondly, the conditions to allow hydraulic fracturing are being increasingly strengthened due to the move from governmental agencies' authority over the issue to elected officials' authority over it. The Shale Gas Drilling Safety Review Act of 2014 issued in Maryland forbids the issuance of drilling permits until a high standard "risk assessment of public health and environmental hazards relating to hydraulic fracturing activities" is conducted for at least 18 months based on the Governor's executive order.

== Institutional discourse and the public ==
A qualitative study using deliberative focus groups has been conducted in the North of England, where the Bowland-Hodder shale, a big shale gas reservoir, is exploited by hydraulic fracturing. These group discussions reflect many concerns on the issue of the use of unconventional oil and unconventional gas. There is a concern about trust linked with a doubt on the ability or will of public authorities to work for the greater social good since private interests and profits of industrial companies are seen as corruptive powers. Alienation is also a concern since the feeling of a game rigged against the public rises due to "decision making being made on your behalf without being given the possibility to voice an opinion". Exploitation also arises since economic rationality that is seen as favoring short-termism is accused of seducing policy-makers and industry. Risk is accentuated by what is hydraulic fracturing as well as what is at stake, and "blind spots" of current knowledge as well as risk assessment analysis are accused of increasing the potentiality of negative outcomes. Uncertainty and ignorance are seen as too important in the issue of hydraulic fracturing and decisions are therefore perceived as rushed, which is why participants favored some form of precautionary approach. There is a major fear on the possible disconnection between the public's and the authorities' visions of what is a good choice for the good reasons.

It also appears that media coverage and institutional responses are widely inaccurate to answer public concerns. Indeed, institutional responses to public concerns are mostly inadequate since they focus on risk assessment and giving information to the public that is considered anxious because ignorant. But public concerns are much wider and it appears that public knowledge on hydraulic fracturing is rather good.

The hydraulic fracturing industry has lobbied for permissive regulation in Europe, the US federal government, and US states. On 20 March 2015 the rules for disclosing the chemicals used were tightened by the Obama administration. The new rules give companies involved 30 days from the beginning of an operation on federal land to disclose those chemicals.

== See also ==
- Regulation of hydraulic fracturing in the United States
- Hydraulic fracturing by country
