= Slickwater =

Fresh water mixed with chemicals used as fracking fluid

In fracking, slickwater is a low viscosity, low salinity, hydraulic fracking fluid intended to move the fracturing proppant in the fractures produced by high hydraulic pressure in unconventional (oil and gas) reservoir. Slickwater is primarily composed of 98–99.5% water and well-calibrated sand particles, with 0.5–2 wt.% chemical additives. These additives are used to prevent scaling (such as carbonate precipitation), induce mineral dissolution, reduce friction, prevent corrosion, inhibit microbial growth, and improve fluid flow. Slickwater is used to create, or enlarge, fractures in low permeability rock formations, such as deep clay or marl formations, for enhancing oil or gas extraction. It is widely used due to its cost-effectiveness and ability to enhance hydrocarbon recovery.

A second type of fracking water, containing gel-like polymer additives, is often referred to as "crosslink". It is more viscous, can tolerate a higher ionic strength (i.e., a higher concentration in total dissolved solids (TDS), as commonly found in concentrated brines) and preferred to carry more easily and deeply in the fractures the granular material used as proppant to maintain the fractures open after the fluid injection and the hydraulic pressure release. Guar gum mixed with borate is often used as a viscosity modifier. The fluid viscosity, depending on the degree of cross-linking of the guar gum with boric acid, is controlled by varying the pH of the solution, and therefore the chemical speciation of the boric acid/borate anion system.

== See also ==
- Fracturing fluids
- List of additives used for fracking
