= Bronidox =

Names
- Preferred IUPAC name 5-Bromo-5-nitro-1,3-dioxane
- Other names 5-Bromo-5-nitro-m-dioxane

Identifiers
CAS Number	30007-47-7
3D model (JSmol)	Interactive image
ChEMBL	ChEMBL3185787
ChemSpider	1741
ECHA InfoCard	100.045.441
EC Number	250-001-7
PubChem CID	1807
UNII	U184I9QBNM
CompTox Dashboard (EPA)	DTXSID1044560
- InChI: InChI=1S/C4H6BrNO4/c5-4(6(7)8)1-9-3-10-2-4/h1-3H2 Key: XVBRCOKDZVQYAY-UHFFFAOYSA-N; InChI=1/C4H6BrNO4/c5-4(6(7)8)1-9-3-10-2-4/h1-3H2 Key: XVBRCOKDZVQYAY-UHFFFAOYAG
- SMILES: O=[N+]([O-])C1(Br)COCOC1

Properties
Chemical formula	C_{4}H_{6}BrNO_{4}
Molar mass	211.999 g·mol^{−1}
Appearance	White crystalline powder
Melting point	60 °C (140 °F; 333 K); 58.5−62 °C
Solubility in water	insoluble

Hazards
- GHS labelling
Pictograms	(GHS05: Corrosive) (GHS07: Exclamation mark) (GHS09: Environmental hazard)
Signal word	Danger
Hazard statements	H302, H314, H315, H317, H410
Precautionary statements	P260, P264, P270, P272, P273, P280, P301+P312, P301+P330+P331, P302+P352, P303+P361+P353, P304+P340, P305+P351+P338, P310, P321, P330, P332+P313, P333+P313, P362, P363, P391, P405, P501
- Lethal dose or concentration (LD, LC)
LD_{50} (median dose)	590 mg/kg (mouse, oral); 455 mg/kg (rat, oral); 31 mg/kg (rat, ipr.); 2500 μg (mouse, skin); 2500 μg (rat, skin)
- Except where otherwise noted, data are given for materials in their standard state (at 25 °C [77 °F], 100 kPa). verify (what is ?) Infobox references

Bronidox, or 5-bromo-5-nitro-1,3-dioxane, is an antimicrobial chemical compound.

Bronidox causes inhibition of enzyme activity in bacteria.

Bronidox is corrosive to metals.

== Uses ==
- Bactericide
- Fungicide, effective against yeast and other fungi
- It is used in immunology for preserving antibodies and antisera in 0.1−0.5% concentration. It is used as preservative to avoid use of sodium azide.
- Stabilizer
- Surfactant
- Used in cosmetics since the mid-1970s as preservative for shampoos, foam bath, etc. Maximum concentration is 0.1%.
- Some users do not recommend use in preparations destined for in vivo or tissue culture work

== See also ==
- Bronopol
