= Nuclear magnetic resonance in porous media =

Nuclear magnetic resonance (NMR) in porous materials covers the application of using NMR as a tool to study the structure of porous media and various processes occurring in them. This technique allows the determination of characteristics such as the porosity and pore size distribution, the permeability, the water saturation, the wettability, etc.

== Theory of relaxation time distribution in porous media ==
Microscopically the volume of a single pore in a porous media may be divided into two regions; surface area $S$ and bulk volume $V$ (Figure 1).

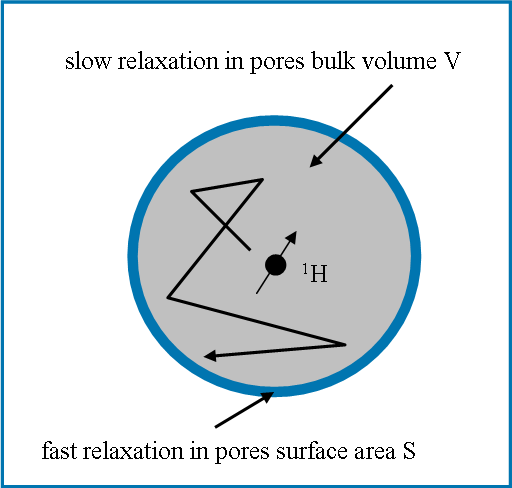
Figure 1: Nuclear spin relaxation properties in a simplified pore are divided into bulk volume $V$ and pore surface area $S$.

The surface area is a thin layer with thickness $\delta$ of a few molecules close to the pore wall surface. The bulk volume is the remaining part of the pore volume and usually dominates the overall pore volume. With respect to NMR excitations of nuclear states for hydrogen-containing molecules in these regions, different relaxation times for the induced excited energy states are expected. The relaxation time is significantly shorter for a molecule in the surface area, compared to a molecule in the bulk volume. This is an effect of paramagnetic centres in the pore wall surface that causes the relaxation time to be faster. The inverse of the relaxation time $T_i$, is expressed by contributions from the bulk volume $V$, the surface area $S$ and the self-diffusion $d$:

$\frac{1}{T_{i}} = \left(1-\frac{\delta S}{V}\right) \frac{1}{T_{ib}}+\frac{\delta S}{V}\frac{1}{T_{is}}+D\frac{\left({\gamma G t_E}\right)^2}{12}$ with $i=1,2$

where $\delta$ is the thickness of the surface area, $S$ is the surface area, $V$ is the pore volume, $T_{ib}$ is the relaxation time in the bulk volume, $T_{is}$ is the relaxation time for the surface, $\gamma$ is the gyromagnetic ratio, $G$ is the magnetic field gradient (assumed to be constant), $t_{E}$ is the time between echoes and $D$ is the self-diffusion coefficient of the fluid. The surface relaxation can be assumed as uniform or non-uniform.

The NMR signal intensity in the $T_2$ distribution plot reflected by the measured amplitude of the NMR signal is proportional to the total amount of hydrogen nuclei, while the relaxation time depends on the interaction between the nuclear spins and the surroundings. In a characteristic pore containing for an example, water, the bulk water exhibits a single exponential decay. The water close to the pore wall surface exhibits faster $T_2$ relaxation time for this characteristic pore size.

== NMR permeability correlations ==
NMR techniques are typically used to predict permeability for fluid typing and to obtain formation porosity, which is independent of mineralogy. The former application uses a surface-relaxation mechanism to relate measured relaxation spectra with surface-to-volume ratios of pores, and the latter is used to estimate permeability. The common approach is based on the model proposed by Brownstein and Tarr. They have shown that, in the fast diffusion limit, given by the expression:

$$\rho r / D$$

where $\rho$ is the surface relaxivity of pore wall material, $r$ is the radius of the spherical pore and $D$ is the bulk diffusivity. The connection between NMR relaxation measurements and petrophysical parameters such as permeability stems from the strong effect that the rock surface has on promoting magnetic relaxation. For a single pore, the magnetic decay as a function of time is described by a single exponential:

$$M(t) = M_0 \mathrm{e}^{-t/T_2}$$

where $M_0$ is the initial magnetization and the transverse relaxation time ${T_2}$ is given by:

$$\frac{1}{T_2}=\frac{1}{T_{2b}}+\rho\frac{S}{V}$$

$S/V$ is the surface-to-volume ratio of the pore, $T_{2b}$ is bulk relaxation time of the fluid that fills the pore space, and $\rho$ is the surface relaxation strength. For small pores or large $\rho$, the bulk relaxation time is small and the equation can be approximated by:

$$\frac{1}{T_2} = \frac{\rho S}{V}$$

Real rocks contain an assembly of interconnected pores of different sizes. The pores are connected through small and narrow pore throats (i.e. links) that restrict interpore diffusion. If interpore diffusion is negligible, each pore can be considered to be distinct and the magnetization within individual pores decays independently of the magnetization in neighbouring pores. The decay can thus be described as:

$$M(t) = M_0 \sum_{i=1}^n{a_i}\mathrm{e}^{-t/T_2}$$

where $a_i$ is the volume fraction of pores of size $i$ that decays with relaxation time ${T_{2i}}$. The multi-exponential representation corresponds to a division of the pore space into $n$ main groups based on $S/V$ (surface-to-volume ratio) values. Due to the pore size variations, a non-linear optimization algorithm with multi-exponential terms is used to fit experimental data. Usually, a weighted geometric mean, $T_{2lm}$, of the relaxation times is used for permeability correlations:

$$T_{2lm}
= \exp\left(\frac{\sum{a_i} \cdot\ln{T_{2i}}}{\sum{a_i}}\right)
= \sqrt[\sum{a_i}]{\prod T_{2i}^{a_i}}$$

${T_{2lm}}$ is thus related to an average $S/V$ or pore size. Commonly used NMR permeability correlations as proposed by Dunn et al. are of the form:

$$k \approx a\Phi^b(T_{2lm})^c$$

where $\Phi$ is the porosity of the rock. The exponents $b$ and $c$ are usually taken as four and two, respectively. Correlations of this form can be rationalized from the Kozeny–Carman equation:

$$k \approx \frac{\Phi}{\tau}\left(\frac{V}{S}\right)^2$$

by assuming that the tortuosity $\tau$ is proportional to $\Phi^{1-b}$. However, it is well known that tortuosity is not only a function of porosity. It also depends on the formation factor $F=\tau/\Phi$. The formation factor can be obtained from resistivity logs and is usually readily available. This has given rise to permeability correlations of the form:

$$k \approx aF^b(T_{2lm})^c$$

Standard values for the exponents $b=-1$ and $c=2$, respectively. Intuitively, correlations of this form are a better model since it incorporates tortuosity information through $F$.

The value of the surface relaxation strength $\rho$ affects strongly the NMR signal decay rate and hence the estimated permeability. Surface relaxivity data are difficult to measure, and most NMR permeability correlations assume a constant $\rho$. However, for heterogeneous reservoir rocks with different mineralogy, $\rho$ is certainly not constant and surface relaxivity has been reported to increase with higher fractions of microporosity. If surface relaxivity data are available it can be included in the NMR permeability correlation as

$$k \approx aF^b(\rho T_{2lm})^c$$

== $T_2$ relaxation ==
For fully brine saturated porous media, three different mechanisms contribute to the relaxation: bulk fluid relaxation, surface relaxation, and relaxation due to gradients in the magnetic field. In the absence of magnetic field gradients, the equations describing the relaxation are:

$$\frac{\delta M}{\delta t}= D_0 \nabla^2 M - \frac{M}{T_{2b}}$$

$D_0 \nabla M + \rho M = 0$ on S

with the initial condition

$t=0$ and $M=M_0$

where $D_0$ is the self-diffusion coefficient. The governing diffusion equation can be solved by a 3D random walk algorithm. Initially, the walkers are launched at random positions in the pore space. At each time step, $\Delta t$, they advance from their current position, $x(t)$, to a new position, $x(t+\Delta t)$, by taking steps of fixed length $\varepsilon$ in a randomly chosen direction. The time step is given by:

$$\delta t = \frac{\varepsilon^2}{6 D_0}$$

The new position is given by

$$x(t+\Delta t) =  x(t) \varepsilon \sin \theta \cos \Phi$$

$$y(t+\Delta t) =  y(t) \varepsilon \sin \theta \cos \Phi$$

$$z(t+\Delta t) =  z(t) \varepsilon \cos \theta$$

The angles $\theta (0 \leqslant \theta \leqslant \pi)$ and $\Phi (0 \leqslant \Phi \leqslant 2 \pi)$ represent the randomly selected direction for each random walker in spherical coordinates. It can be noted that $\theta$ must be distributed uniformly in the range (0,$\pi$). If a walker encounters a pore-solid interface, it is killed with a finite probability $\delta$. The killing probability $\delta$ is related to the surface relaxation strength by:

$$\delta=\frac{2 \varepsilon \rho}{3 D_0}$$

If the walker survives, it simply bounces off the interface and its position does not change. At each time step, the fraction $p(t)$ of the initial walkers that are still alive is recorded. Since the walkers move with equal probability in all directions, the above algorithm is valid as long as there is no magnetic gradient in the system.

When protons are diffusing, the sequence of spin echo amplitudes is affected by inhomogeneities in the permanent magnetic field. This results in an additional decay of the spin echo amplitudes that depends on the echo spacing $2 \Delta t$. In the simple case of a uniform spatial gradient $G$, the additional decay can be expressed as a multiplicative factor:

$$g(t)=\mathrm{e}^{-\gamma^2 G^2 D_0 (\Delta \tau)^2 t}$$

where $\gamma$ is the ratio of the Larmor frequency to the magnetic field intensity. The total magnetization amplitude as a function of time is then given as:

$$M(t)=M_0 \left((p(t) g(t) \mathrm{e}^{-t/T_{2b}}\right)$$

== NMR as a tool to measure wettability ==
The wettability conditions in a porous media containing two or more immiscible fluid phases determine the microscopic fluid distribution in the pore network. Nuclear magnetic resonance measurements are sensitive to wettability because of the strong effect that the solid surface has on promoting magnetic relaxation of the saturating fluid. The idea of using NMR as a tool to measure wettability was presented by Brown and Fatt in 1956. The magnitude of this effect depends upon the wettability characteristics of the solid with respect to the liquid in contact with the surface. Their theory is based on the hypothesis that molecular movements are slower in the bulk liquid than at the solid-liquid interface. In this solid-liquid interface the diffusion coefficient is reduced, which correspond to a zone of higher viscosity. In this higher viscosity zone, the magnetically aligned protons can more easily transfer their energy to their surroundings. The magnitude of this effect depends upon the wettability characteristics of the solid with respect to the liquid in contact with the surface.

== NMR Cryoporometry for measuring pore size distributions ==
NMR Cryoporometry (NMRC) is a recent technique for measuring total porosity and pore size distributions. It makes use of the Gibbs-Thomson effect : small crystals of a liquid in the pores melt at a lower temperature than the bulk liquid : The melting point depression is inversely proportional to the pore size. The technique is closely related to that of the use of gas adsorption to measure pore sizes (Kelvin equation). Both techniques are particular cases of the Gibbs Equations (Josiah Willard Gibbs): the Kelvin Equation is the constant temperature case, and the Gibbs-Thomson Equation is the constant pressure case.

To make a Cryoporometry measurement, a liquid is imbibed into the porous sample, the sample cooled until all the liquid is frozen, and then warmed slowly while measuring the quantity of the liquid that has melted. Thus it is similar to DSC thermoporosimetry, but has higher resolution, as the signal detection does not rely on transient heat flows, and the measurement can be made arbitrarily slowly. It is suitable for measuring pore diameters in the range 2 nm–2 μm.

Nuclear Magnetic Resonance (NMR) may be used as a convenient method of measuring the quantity of liquid that has melted, as a function of temperature, making use of the fact that the $T_2$ relaxation time in a frozen material is usually much shorter than that in a mobile liquid. The technique was developed at the University of Kent in the UK. It is also possible to adapt the basic NMRC experiment to provide structural resolution in spatially dependent pore size distributions, or to provide behavioural information about the confined liquid.

== See also ==
- Earth's field NMR (EFNMR)
- Low field NMR
- NMR
- NMR spectroscopy
