= Fracking and radionuclides =

Hydraulic fracturing is the propagation of fractures in a rock layer by pressurized fluid. Induced hydraulic fracturing or hydrofracking, commonly known as fracking, is a technique used to release petroleum, natural gas (including shale gas, tight gas and coal seam gas), or other substances for extraction, particularly from unconventional reservoirs. Radionuclides are associated with fracking in two main ways. Injection of man-made radioactive tracers, along with the other substances in hydraulic-fracturing fluid, is often used to determine the injection profile and location of fractures created by fracking. In addition, fracking releases naturally occurring heavy metals and radioactive materials from shale deposits, and these substances return to the surface with flowback, also referred to as wastewater.

== Naturally occurring radionuclides ==
There are naturally occurring radioactive material (e.g., radium and radon) in shale deposits. Hydraulic fracturing can dislodge naturally occurring heavy metals and radioactive materials from shale deposits, and these substances return to the surface with flowback, also referred to as wastewater or brine. These naturally occurring radionuclides are of more concern than some man-made radionuclides used in fracture monitoring because of their long half-lives. Radium-226 is a product of Uranium-238 decay, and is the longest-lived isotope of radium with a half-life of 1601 years; next longest is Radium-228, a product of Thorium-232 breakdown, with a half-life of 5.75 years. Radon (Rn) is a naturally occurring product of the decay of uranium or thorium. Its most stable isotope, Radon-222, has a half-life of 3.8 days. Strontium is also naturally occurring and may be dislodged by the process. Higher levels of Lead-210, the decay product of Radon-222, have been found on the airborne particulate matters that are collected downwind of wells completed with hydraulic fracturing.

== Injected radionuclides ==
Injection of radioactive tracers, along with the other substances in hydraulic-fracturing fluid, is often used to determine the injection profile and location of fractures created by hydraulic fracturing. Patents describe in detail how several tracers are typically used in the same well. Wells are hydraulically fractured in different stages. Tracers with different half-lives are used for each stage. Their half-lives range from 40.2 hours (Lanthanum-140) to 28.90 years (Strontium-90). Amounts per injection of radionuclide are listed in the US Nuclear Regulatory Commission (NRC) guidelines. The NRC guidelines also list a wide range or radioactive materials in solid, liquid and gaseous forms that are used as field flood or enhanced oil and gas recovery study applications tracers used in single and multiple wells. According to the NRC, some of the most commonly used include Antimony-124, Bromine-82, Iodine-125, Iodine-131, Iridium-192, and Scandium-46. A 2003 publication by the International Atomic Energy Agency (IAEA) provides a detailed description of tracer use, confirms the frequent use of most of the tracers above, and says that Manganese-56, Sodium-24, Technetium-m, Silver-m, Argon-41, and Xenon-133 are also used extensively because they are easily identified and measured. Other potentially suitable tracers are named in various patents. In terms of quantities used, the NRC gives the following examples: Iodine-131, gas form, 100 millicuries total, not to exceed 20 millicuries per injection; Iodine-131, liquid form, 50 millicuries total, not to exceed 10 millicuries per injection; Iridium-192, "Labeled" frac sand, 200 millicuries total, not to exceed 15 millicuries per injection; Silver-110m, liquid form, 200 millicuries total, not to exceed 20 millicuries per injection.

Other gamma-emitting tracer isotopes used are Antimony-121, Antimony-122, Antimony-123, Antimony-125, Antimony-126, Antimony-127, Carbon-14, Chromium-51, Cobalt-57, Cobalt-58, Cobalt-60, Gold-198, Iodine-127, Iodine-128, Iodine-129, Iodine-130, Iron-59, Krypton-85, Lanthanum-140, Potassium-39 (activated to Potassium-40), Potassium-41 (activated to Potassium-42), Potassium-43, Rubidium-86, Scandium-45, Scandium-47, Scandium-48, Silver-110, Sodium-22, Strontium-85, Strontium-90, Tritium, Zinc-65, and Zirconium-95.

== Environmental impact ==
Concerns have been expressed that both naturally occurring radionuclides and radioactive tracers may return to the surface with flowback and during blow outs. Wastewater from the wells is released into rivers, injected into wells, and evaporated from ponds. The Times reported that studies by the United States Environmental Protection Agency and a confidential study by the drilling industry concluded that radioactivity in drilling waste cannot be fully diluted in rivers and other waterways. Recycling the wastewater has been proposed as a solution but has its limitations. The New York Times has reported on radium and gross alpha radiation levels in wastewater (also called flowback) from natural gas wells. It collected data from more than 200 natural gas wells in Pennsylvania. The New York Times has compiled a map of these wells and their wastewater contamination levels.

Political, governmental, and industry pressures have prevented the United States Environmental Protection Agency (EPA) from studying risks associated with radionuclides or other chemicals in hydraulic fracturing fluids in wastewater, source water, and drinking water. The scope of the EPA Hydraulic Fracturing Draft Study Plan was narrowed to exclude them.

== Health impact ==
As radon decays, it produces radioactive decay products. If the contaminated dust of these "radon daughters" are inhaled, they can lodge in the lungs and increase the risk of developing lung cancer. Iodine in food is absorbed by the body and preferentially concentrated in the thyroid where it is needed for the functioning of that gland. When Iodine-131 is present in high levels in the environment from hydraulic fracturing flowback and blowouts, it can be absorbed through contaminated food and water, and will also accumulate in the thyroid. As it decays, it may cause damage to the thyroid. The primary risk from exposure to high levels of iodine-131 is the chance occurrence of radiogenic thyroid cancer in later life. Other risks include the possibility of non-cancerous growths and thyroiditis. The level of radiation in hydraulic fracturing wastewater has been measured to be as high as 18,035 pCi/L, thousands of times the maximum allowed by the federal standard for drinking water, and there are concerns about radiation exposure during spills and blowouts. Long term exposure to low level radiation is associated with stochastic health effects; the greater the exposure, the more likely the health effects are to occur. A group of doctors from the United States have called for a moratorium on hydraulic fracturing until health effects are more thoroughly studied.

== Regulation ==
The US Nuclear Regulatory Commission (NRC) and approved state agencies regulate the use of injected radionuclides in hydraulic fracturing in the United States. Federal and state regulators do not require sewage treatment plants that accept drilling waste to test for radioactivity. In Pennsylvania, where the hydraulic fracturing drilling boom began in 2008, most drinking-water intake plants downstream from those sewage treatment plants have not tested for radioactivity since before 2006. The EPA has asked the Pennsylvania Department of Environmental Protection to require community water systems in certain locations, and centralized wastewater treatment facilities to conduct testing for radionuclides. Safe drinking water standards have not yet been established to account for radioactivity levels of hydraulic fracturing waste water, and although water suppliers are required to inform citizens of radon and other radionuclides levels in their water, this doesn't always happen. Radioactive tracers are not yet listed on FracFocus, a website indicating chemical composition of fracking fluid of individual wells, but federal and state nuclear regulatory agencies keep records of their use.
