= Converted-wave analysis =

During seismic exploration, P-waves (also known as primary or compressive waves) penetrate down into the earth. Due to mode conversion, a P-wave can reflect upwards as an S-wave (also known as a secondary, shear or transverse wave) when it hits an interface (e.g., solid-liquid). Other P-wave to S-wave (P-S) conversions can occur, but the down-up conversion is the primary focus. Unlike P-waves, converted shear waves are largely unaffected by fluids. By analyzing the original and converted waves, seismologists obtain additional subsurface information, especially due to (1) differential velocity (V_{P}/V_{S}), (2) asymmetry in the waves' angles of incidence and reflection and (3) amplitude variations.

As opposed to analysis of P-wave to P-wave (P-P) reflection, c-wave (P-S) analysis is more complex. C-wave analysis requires at least three times as many measurement channels per station. Variations in reflection depths can cause significant analytic problems. Gathering, mapping, and binning c-wave data is also more difficult than P-P data. However, c-wave analysis can provide additional information needed to create a three-dimensional depth image of rock type, structure, and saturant. For example, changes in V_{S} with respect to V_{P} suggest changing lithology and pore geometry.
