= Bronopol =

- Bronopol

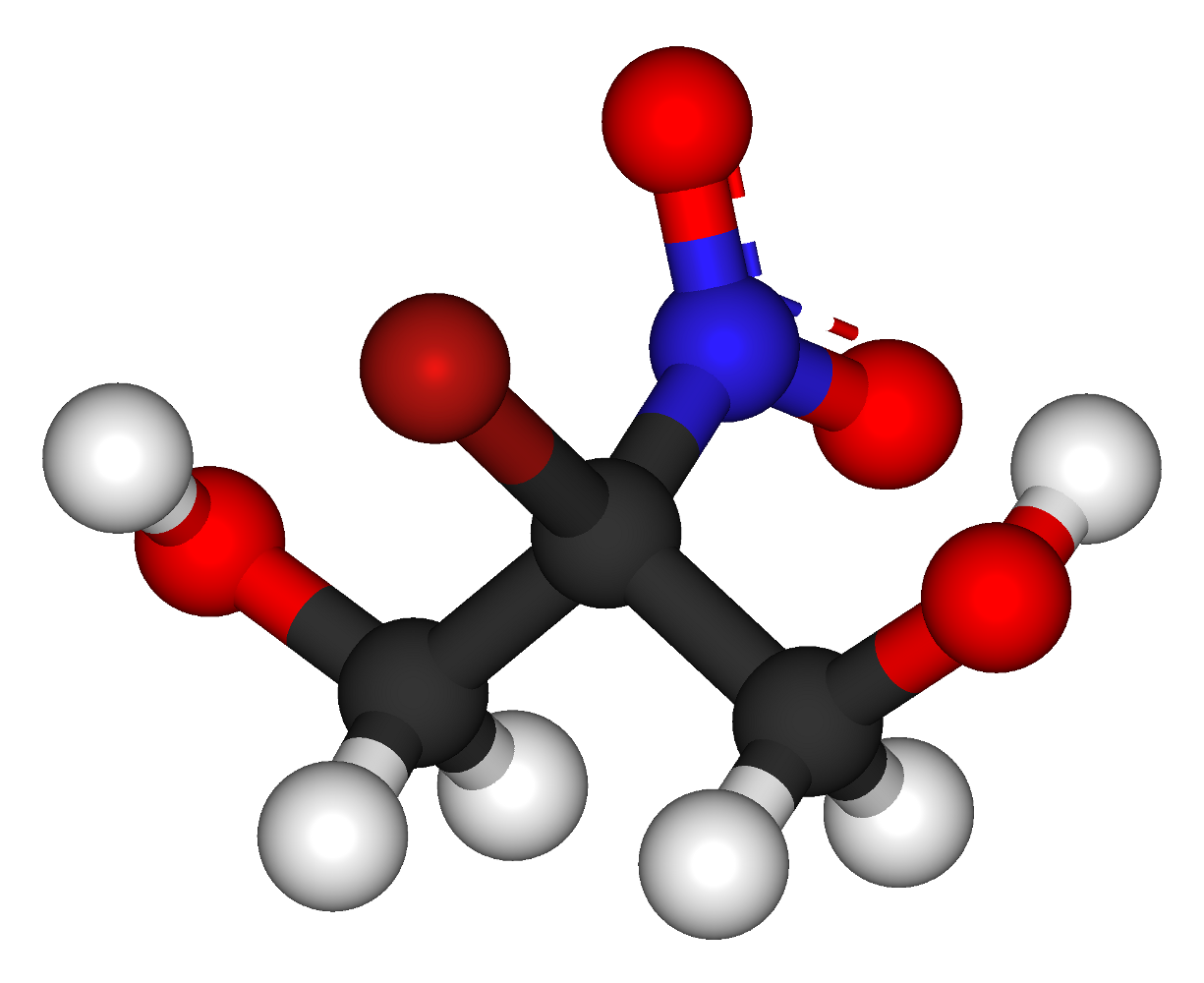

Names
- Preferred IUPAC name 2-Bromo-2-nitropropane-1,3-diol

Identifiers
CAS Number	52-51-7
3D model (JSmol)	Interactive image
ChEMBL	ChEMBL1408862
ChemSpider	2356
ECHA InfoCard	100.000.131
EC Number	200-143-0
KEGG	D01577
PubChem CID	2450
RTECS number	TY3385000
UNII	6PU1E16C9W
UN number	3241
CompTox Dashboard (EPA)	DTXSID8024652
- InChI: InChI=1S/C3H6BrNO4/c4-3(1-6,2-7)5(8)9/h6-7H,1-2H2 Key: LVDKZNITIUWNER-UHFFFAOYSA-N; InChI=1/C3H6BrNO4/c4-3(1-6,2-7)5(8)9/h6-7H,1-2H2 Key: LVDKZNITIUWNER-UHFFFAOYAZ
- SMILES: [O-][N+](=O)C(Br)(CO)CO

Properties
Chemical formula	C_{3}H_{6}BrNO_{4}
Molar mass	199.988 g·mol^{−1}
Appearance	White solid
Density	1.1 g/cm^{3}
Melting point	130 °C (266 °F; 403 K)
Boiling point	140 °C (284 °F; 413 K) (decomposes)

Pharmacology
ATCvet code	QD01AE91 (WHO)

Hazards
- GHS labelling
Pictograms	(GHS05: Corrosive) (GHS07: Exclamation mark) (GHS09: Environmental hazard)
Signal word	Danger
Hazard statements	H302, H312, H315, H318, H335, H400
Precautionary statements	P261, P264, P270, P271, P273, P280, P301+P312, P302+P352, P304+P340, P305+P351+P338, P310, P312, P321, P322, P330, P332+P313, P362, P363, P391, P403+P233, P405, P501
- Except where otherwise noted, data are given for materials in their standard state (at 25 °C [77 °F], 100 kPa). verify (what is ?) Infobox references

Bronopol (INN; chemical name 2-bromo-2-nitropropane-1,3-diol) is an organic compound that is used as an antimicrobial. It is a white solid although commercial samples appear yellow.

The first reported synthesis of bronopol was in 1897.

Bronopol was invented by The Boots Company PLC in the early 1960s and first applications were as a preservative for pharmaceuticals. Due to its low mammalian toxicity at in-use levels and high activity against bacteria, especially Gram-negative species, bronopol became popular as a preservative in many consumer products such as shampoos and cosmetics. It was subsequently adopted as an antimicrobial in other industrial environments such as paper mills, oil exploration, and production facilities, as well as cooling water disinfection plants.

== Production ==
Bronopol is produced by the bromination of di(hydroxymethyl)nitromethane, which is derived from nitromethane by a nitroaldol reaction. World production increased from the tens of tonnes in the late 1970s to current estimates in excess of 5,000 tonnes. Production today is the business of low cost producers, mainly in China.

== Applications ==
Bronopol is used in consumer products as an effective preservative agent, as well as a wide variety of industrial applications (almost any industrial water system is a potential environment for bacterial growth, leading to slime and corrosion problems - in many of these systems bronopol can be a highly effective treatment).

The use of bronopol in personal care products (cosmetics, toiletries) has declined since the late 1980s due to the potential formation of nitrosamines. While bronopol is not in itself a nitrosating agent, under conditions where it decomposes (alkaline solution and/or elevated temperatures) it can liberate nitrite and low levels of formaldehyde and these decomposition products can react with any contaminant secondary amines or amides in a personal care formulation to produce significant levels of nitrosamines (due to the toxicity of these substances, the term 'significant' means levels as low as tens of parts per billion).

Manufacturers of personal care products are therefore instructed by regulatory authorities to avoid the formation of nitrosamines which might mean removing amines or amides from the formulation, removing bronopol from a formulation, or using nitrosamine inhibitors.

Bronopol has been restricted for use in cosmetics in Canada.

== Physical and chemical properties ==
=== Appearance ===
Bronopol is supplied as crystals or crystalline powder, which may vary from white to pale yellow in colour depending on the grade. The yellow coloration is due to chelation of iron during the manufacturing process.

=== Melting point ===
As a pure material, bronopol has a melting point of about 130 °C. However, due to its polymorphic characteristics, bronopol undergoes a lattice rearrangement at 100 to 105 °C and this can often be wrongly interpreted as the melting point.

At temperatures above 140 °C, bronopol decomposes exothermically releasing hydrogen bromide and oxides of nitrogen.

=== Solubility ===
Bronopol is readily soluble in water; the dissolution process is endothermic. Solutions containing up to 28% w/v are possible at ambient temperature.

Bronopol is poorly soluble in non-polar solvents but shows a high affinity for polar organic solvents.

Solubilities at 22–25 °C
Solvent	%w/v
Water	28
Methanol	89
Ethanol	56
Isopropanol	41
Liquid paraffin	<0.5

=== Partition coefficient ===
Study of the solubility data shows that bronopol has a high affinity for polar rather than non-polar environments. In two-phase systems, bronopol partitions preferentially into the polar (usually aqueous) phase.

Partition coefficients at 22–24 °C
Solvent combination	Partition coefficient
Hexanol/water	0.74
Liquid alkane/water	0.043
Chloroform/water	0.068

=== Stability in aqueous solution ===
In aqueous solutions, bronopol is most stable when the pH of the system is on the acid side of neutral. Temperature also has a significant effect on stability in alkaline systems.

=== Degradation ===
Under extreme alkaline conditions, bronopol decomposes in aqueous solution and very low levels of formaldehyde are produced. Liberated formaldehyde is not responsible for the biological activity associated with bronopol. Other decomposition products detected after bronopol breakdown are bromide ion, nitrite ion, bromonitroethanol and 2-hydroxymethyl-2-nitropropane-1,3-diol.

== Allergy ==
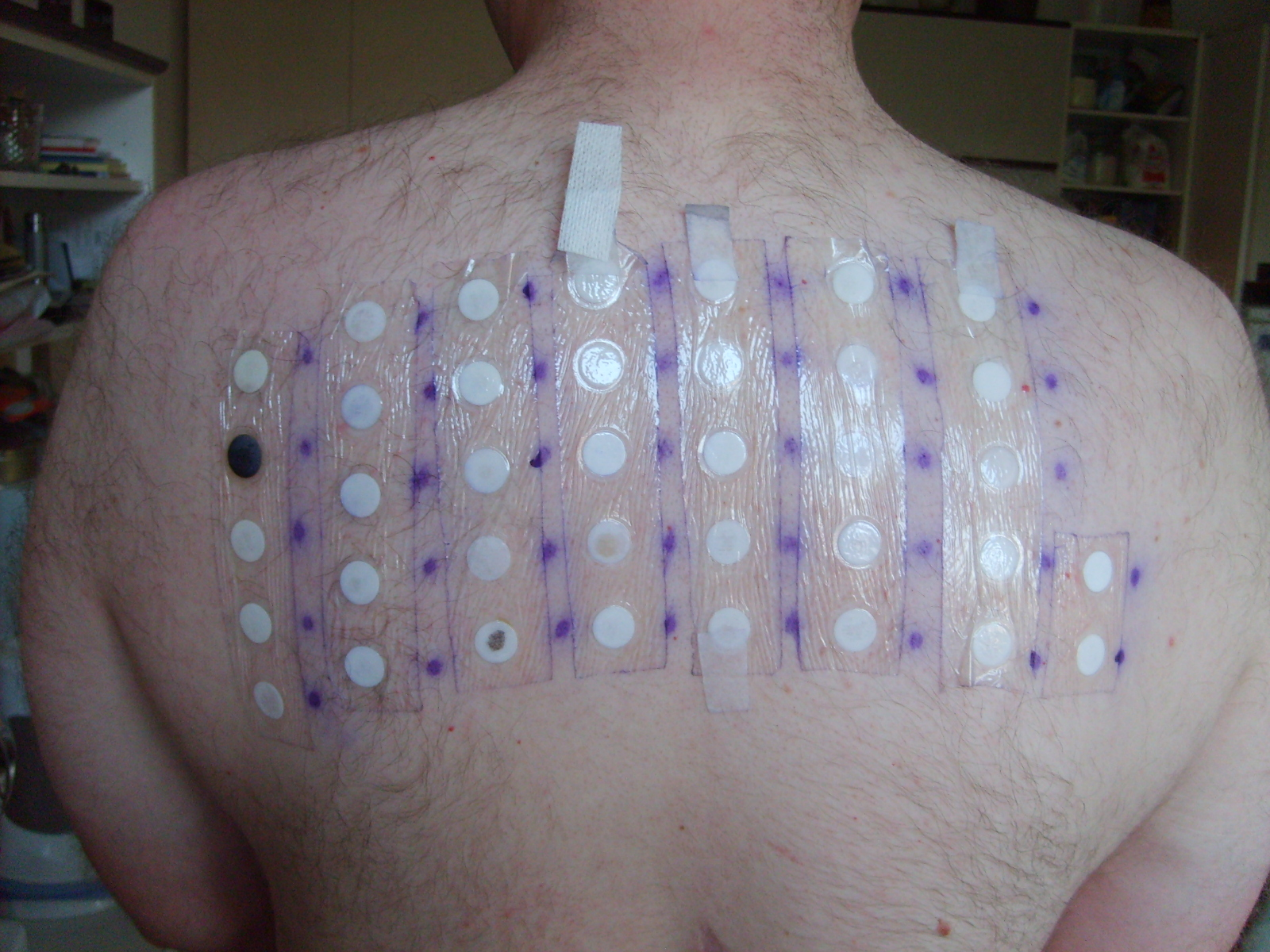
Patch test

In 2005–2006, it was the 15th-most-prevalent allergen in patch tests (3.4%) of people with suspected allergic contact dermatitis. It is used as a substitute for formaldehyde, a disinfectant and preservative, in solvents. It is prevalent in skin and personal care products and topical medications.

== See also ==
- Bronidox
