= Density logging =

Density logging is a well logging tool that can provide a continuous record of a formation's bulk density along the length of a borehole. In geology, bulk density is a function of the density of the minerals forming a rock (i.e. matrix) and the fluid enclosed in the pore spaces. This is one of three well logging tools that are commonly used to calculate porosity, the other two being sonic logging and neutron porosity logging

== History & Principle ==
The tool was initially developed in the 1950s and became widely utilized across the hydrocarbon industry by the 1960s. A type of active nuclear tool, a radioactive source and detector are lowered down the borehole and the source emits medium-energy gamma rays into the formation. Radioactive sources are typically a directional Cs-137 source. These gamma rays interact with electrons in the formation and are scattered in an interaction known as Compton scattering. The number of scattered gamma rays that reach the detector, placed at a set distance from the emitter, is related to the formation's electron density, which itself is related to the formation's bulk density ($\rho_\text{bulk}$) via

$$\rho_\text{e} = 2\rho_\text{bulk} \ \frac{ Z}{A}$$

where $Z$ is the atomic number, and $A$ is the molecular weight of the compound. For most elements $Z/A$ is about 1/2 (except for hydrogen where this ratio is 1). The electron density ($\rho_\text{e}$) in g/cm^{3} determines the response of the density tool.

== General tool design ==
The tool itself initially consisted of a radioactive source and a single detector, but this configuration is susceptible to the effects of the drilling fluid. In a similar way to how the sonic logging tool was improved to compensate for borehole effects, density logging now conventionally uses 2 or more detectors. In a 2 detector configuration, the short-spaced detector has a much shallower depth of investigation than the long-spaced detector so it is used to measure the effect that the drilling fluid has on the gamma ray detection. This result is then used to correct the long-spaced detector.

== Inferring porosity from bulk density ==
Assuming that the measured bulk density ($\rho_\text{bulk}$) only depends on matrix density ($\rho_\text{matrix}$) and fluid density ($\rho_\text{fluid}$), and that these values are known along the wellbore, porosity ($\phi$) can be inferred by the formula

$$\phi = \frac{\rho_\text{matrix} - \rho_\text{bulk}}{\rho_\text{matrix}-\rho_\text{fluid}}$$

Common values of matrix density $\rho_\text{matrix}$ (in g/cm^{3}) are:

- Quartz sand - 2.65
- Limestone - 2.71
- Dolomite - 2.87

This method is the most reliable porosity indicator for sandstones and limestones because their density is well known. On the other hand, the density of clay minerals such as mudstone is highly variable, depending on depositional environment, overburden pressure, type of clay mineral and many other factors. It can vary from 2.1 (montmorillonite) to 2.76 (chlorite) so this tool is not as useful for determining their porosity. A fluid bulk density $\rho_\text{fluid}$ of 1 g/cm^{3} is appropriate where the water is fresh but highly saline water has a slightly higher density and lower values should be used for hydrocarbon reservoirs, depending on the hydrocarbon density and residual saturation.

In some applications hydrocarbons are indicated by the presence of abnormally high log porosities.

== See also ==
Sonic logging
