= Microearthquake =

A microearthquake (or microquake) is a very low-intensity earthquake that is 2.0 or less in magnitude. They are very rarely felt beyond 8 km (5 mi) from their epicenter. In addition to having natural tectonic causes, they may also be seen as a result of underground nuclear testing or even large detonations of conventional explosives for producing excavations. They normally cause no damage to life or property, and are very rarely felt by people.

Microquakes occur often near volcanoes as they approach an eruption, and frequently in certain regions exploited for geothermal energy, such as near Geyserville in Northern California. These occur so continuously that the current USGS event map for that location usually shows a substantial number of small earthquakes at that location.
