= List of additives used for fracking =

The differences between additives for fracking in different countries are the type of chemicals used (hazardous, non-hazardous), the disclosure of chemicals and the composition of fracturing fluid. In 2010, Halliburton announced the creation of food additive based hydraulic fracturing fluid in response to calls for transparency and demand for a "more environmentally friendly" unconventional hydrocarbon production.

== Europe ==
In Europe, Poland, Norway and Germany have the largest reserves of shale gas, and drillings are underway.

== United Kingdom ==
In the United Kingdom, the environmental regulator permits only chemical additives which are classed as non hazardous to groundwater for fracturing fluids. Operators are required to disclose the content of hydraulic fracturing fluids to the relevant environment agency, while the composition must be disclosed if the regulator demands it. The permitted additives for hydraulic fracturing fluid include polycrylamide, hydrochloric acid and a biocide.

CAS number	Chemical constituent	Commercial use
9003-05-8	poly(2-prop-enamide)/polyacrylamide	EOR friction reducer
7647-01-0	Hydrochloric acid	Pre-fracturing to clean perforations, water pH adjuster
14808-60-7	Crystalline silica (quartz)	Proppant
111-30-8	Glutaraldehyde	Biocide
7647-14-5	Sodium chloride	Chem tracer
7727-37-9	Nitrogen	Waterless hydraulic fracturing

== United States ==
In the U.S., about 750 compounds have been listed as additives for hydraulic fracturing, also known as ingredients of pressurized fracking fluid, in an industry report to the U.S. Congress in 2011. The following is a partial list of the chemical constituents in additives that are used or may have been used in fracturing operations.

CAS number	Chemical constituent	Commercial use
2634-33-5	1,2-Benzisothiazolin-2-one / 1,2-benzisothiazolin-3-one	Insecticide spray, stain remover, biocide
95-63-6	1,2,4-trimethylbenzene	Automatic transmission sealer
123-91-1	1,4-Dioxane	Wood parquet adhesive
3452-07-1	1-eicosene	Alpha olefin lubricant
629-73-2	1-hexadecene	Alpha olefin lubricant
112-88-9	1-octadecene	Alpha olefin lubricant
1120-36-1	1-tetradecene	Stain remover
10222-01-2	2,2 Dibromo-3-nitrilopropionamide	Biocide
27776-21-2	2,2'-azobis-{2-(imidazlin-2-yl)propane}-dihydrochloride	No record
73003-80-2	2,2-Dibromomalonamide	Biocide
15214-89-8	2-Acrylamido-2-methylpropane sulphonic acid sodium salt polymer	Friction reducer
46830-22-2	2-acryloyloxyethyl(benzyl)dimethylammonium chloride	No record
52-51-7	2-Bromo-2-nitro-1,3-propanediol	Deodorant, conditioner
111-76-2	2-Butoxy ethanol	Engine cleaner, degreaser, solvent
1113-55-9	2-Dibromo-3-nitriloprionamide (2-monobromo-3-nitriilopropionamide)	No record
104-76-7	2-Ethyl hexanol	Diesel fuel treatment, foam reducer
67-63-0	2-Propanol / Isopropyl alcohol / isopropanol / propan-2-ol	Damar varnish, gloss, pour point reducer
26062-79-3	2-Propen-1-aminium, N,N-dimethyl-N-2-propenyl-chloride, homopolymer	Volumizing conditioner
9003-03-6	2-propenoic acid, homopolymer, ammonium salt	Moisturizer, sunscreen, friction reducer
25987-30-8	2-Propenoic acid, polymer with 2 p-propenamide, sodium salt / copolymer of acrylamide and sodium acrylate	Friction reducer
71050-62-9	2-Propenoic acid, polymer with sodium phosphinate (1:1)	No record
66019-18-9	2-propenoic acid, telomer with sodium hydrogen sulfite	No record
107-19-7	2-Propyn-1-ol / propargyl alcohol	No record
51229-78-8	3,5,7-Triaza-1-azoniatricyclo[3.3.1.13,7]decane, 1-(3-chloro-2-propenyl)-chloride	Clean pressed powder
115-19-5	3-methyl-1-butyn-3-ol	No record
127087-87-0	4-Nonylphenol polyethylene glycol ether branched / nonylphenol ethoxylated / oxyalkylated phenol	Chrome wheel cleaner, wellbore/pipe cleaner, degreaser, emulsifier
64-19-7	Acetic acid	Silicone sealant
68442-62-6	Acetic acid, hydroxy-, reaction products with triethanolamine	No record
108-24-7	Acetic anhydride	No record
67-64-1	Acetone	Solvent, clear finish gloss
38193-60-1	Acrylamide – sodium 2-acrylamido-2-methylpropane sulfonate copolymer	Moisture, lotion, friction reducer
25085-02-3	Acrylamide – aodium acrylate copolymer or anionic polyacrylamide	Friction reducer
25987-30-8	2-Propenoic acid, polymer with 2-propenamide, sodium salt	Friction reducer
69418-26-4	Acrylamide polymer with N,N,N-trimethyl-2[1-oxo-2-propenyl]oxy ethanaminium chloride	Friction reducer
15085	−02-3 Acrylamide-sodium acrylate copolymer	Friction reducer, flocculant
68551-12-2	Alcohols, C12-C16, ethoxylated (a.k.a. ethoxylated alcohol)	Floor cleaner, stain remover, wellbore cleaner, emulsifier
64742-47-8	Aliphatic hydrocarbon / hydrotreated light distillate / petroleum distillates / isoparaffinic solvent / paraffin solvent / napthenic solvent	Tar remover, lubricant
64743-02-8	Alkenes	No record
68439-57-6	Alkyl (C14-C16) olefin sulfonate, sodium salt	Car wash, dog shampoo, emulsifier
9016-45-9	Alkylphenol ethoxylate surfactants	Engine cleaner, rubber sealant, emulsifier
1327-41-9	Aluminum chloride	Antiperspirant
73138-27-9	Amines, C12-14-tert-alkyl, ethoxylated	No record
71011-04-6	Amines, ditallow alkyl, ethoxylated	No record
68551-33-7	Amines, tallow alkyl, ethoxylated, acetates	No record
1336-21-6	Ammonia	Stripper, glue, tire repair
631-61-8	Ammonium acetate	Haircolor shine
68037-05-8	Ammonium alcohol ether sulfate	No record
7783-20-2	Ammonium bisulfate	Ant killer, weed & moss control
10192-30-0	Ammonium bisulfite	Oxygen scavenger
12125-02-9	Ammonium chloride	Brass & copper polish, bleach
7632-50-0	Ammonium citrate	Iron remover
37475-88-0	Ammonium cumene sulfonate	No record
1341-49-7	Ammonium hydrogen-difluoride	Wheel cleaner, glass etching
6484-52-2	Ammonium nitrate	Moisture control, ink cartridge
7727-54-0	Ammonium persulfate / diammonium peroxidisulphate	Latex paint, maximizing powder, polymer breaker
1762-95-4	Ammonium thiocyanate	Liquid hide glue, biocide
7664-41-7	Aqueous ammonia	Paint stripper, caulk
121888-68-4	Bentonite, benzyl(hydrogenated tallow alkyl) dimethylammonium stearate complex / organophilic clay	Wine clearing agent, "detox" product, oil viscosifier
71-43-2	Benzene	Fuel system cleaner, degreaser
119345-04-9	Benzene, 1,1'-oxybis, tetratpropylene derivatives, sulfonated, sodium salts	Toilet cleaner, rust meutralizer
74153-51-8	Benzenemethanaminium, N,N-dimethyl-N-[2-[(1-oxo-2-propenyl)oxy]ethyl]-, chloride, polymer with 2-propenamide	No record
10043-35-3	Boric acid	Roach killer, stain remover, polymer crosslinker
1303-86-2	Boric oxide / boric anhydride	Carpenters glue, polymer crosslinker
71-36-3	Butan-1-ol	Interior/exterior paint, solvent
68002-97-1	C10–C16 ethoxylated alcohol	Floor finish remover, degreaser, wellbore cleaner
68131-39-5	C12–15 alcohol, ethoxylated	Graffiti remover, radiator flush, wellbore cleaner
10043-52-4	Calcium chloride	Chlorinating sanitizer, ice melt
124-38-9	Carbon dioxide	Penetrant, lubricator
68130-15-4	Carboxymethylhydroxypropyl guar	Viscosifier
9012-54-8	Cellulase / hemicellulase enzyme	Cellulose breaker
9004-34-6	Cellulose	Wellbore sealant
10049-04-4	Chlorine dioxide	Oxidizer
77-92-9	Citric acid	Acidizer and iron chelator
94266-47-4	Citrus terpenes	Degreaser
61789-40-0	Cocamidopropyl betaine	Foamer, wellbore cleaner
68155-09-9	Cocamidopropylamine oxide	Foamer, wellbore cleaner
68424-94-2	Coco-betaine	Foamer, wellbore cleaner
7758-98-7	Copper(II) sulfate	Fungicide
31726-34-8	Crissanol A-55	
14808-60-7	Crystalline silica (quartz)	Sand
7447-39-4	Cupric chloride dihydrate	
1120-24-7	Decyldimethyl amine	
2605-79-0	Decyl-dimethyl amine oxide	
3252-43-5	Dibromoacetonitrile	
25340-17-4	Diethylbenzene	
111-46-6	Diethylene glycol	Solvent
22042-96-2	Diethylenetriamine penta (methylenephonic acid) sodium salt	
28757-00-8	Diisopropyl naphthalenesulfonic acid	
68607-28-3	Dimethylcocoamine, bis(chloroethyl) ether, diquaternary ammonium salt	
7398-69-8	Dimethyldiallylammonium chloride	Biocide
25265-71-8	Dipropylene glycol	Solvent
139-33-3	Disodium ethylene diamine tetra acetate	Metal ion chelator
5989-27-5	D-Limonene	Solvent
123-01-3	Dodecylbenzene	
27176-87-0	Dodecylbenzene sulfonic acid	
42504-46-1	Dodecylbenzenesulfonate isopropanolamine	Wellbore cleaner
50-70-4	D-Sorbitol / sorbitol	
37288-54-3	Endo-1,4-beta-mannanase, or hemicellulase	
149879-98-1	Erucic amidopropyl dimethyl betaine	
89-65-6	Erythorbic acid, anhydrous	
54076-97-0	Ethanaminium, N,N,N-trimethyl-2-[(1-oxo-2-propenyl)oxy]-, chloride, homopolymer	
107-21	−1 Ethane-1,2-diol / ethylene glycol	
9002-93-1	Ethoxylated 4-tert-octylphenol	
68439-50-9	Ethoxylated alcohol	Wellbore cleaner
126950-60-5	Ethoxylated alcohol	Wellbore cleaner
67254-71-1	Ethoxylated alcohol (C10-12)	Wellbore cleaner
68951-67-7	Ethoxylated alcohol (C14-15)	Wellbore cleaner
68439-46-3	Ethoxylated alcohol (C9-11)	Wellbore cleaner
66455-15-0	Ethoxylated alcohols	Wellbore cleaner
84133-50-6	Ethoxylated alcohols (C12-14 Secondary)	Wellbore cleaner
68439-51-0	Ethoxylated alcohols (C12-14)	Wellbore cleaner
78330-21-9	Ethoxylated branch alcohol	Wellbore cleaner
34398-01-1	Ethoxylated C11 alcohol	Wellbore cleaner
61791-12-6	Ethoxylated Castor Oil	Wellbore cleaner
61791-29-5	Ethoxylated fatty acid, coco	Wellbore cleaner
61791-08-0	Ethoxylated fatty acid, coco, reaction product with ethanolamine	Wellbore cleaner
68439-45-2	Ethoxylated hexanol	Wellbore cleaner
9036-19-5	Ethoxylated octylphenol	Wellbore cleaner
9005-67-8	Ethoxylated Sorbitan Monostearate	Dispersant, wellbore cleaner
9004-70-3	Ethoxylated Sorbitan Trioleate	Dispersant, wellbore cleaner
64-17-5	Ethyl alcohol / ethanol	Solvent, pour point fepressant
100-41-4	Ethyl nenzene	
97-64-3	Ethyl lactate	
9003-11-6	Ethylene nlycol–propylene glycol copolymer (oxirane, methyl-, polymer with oxirane)	
75-21-8	Ethylene oxide	
5877-42-9	Ethyloctynol	
68526-86-3	Exxal 13	
61790-12-3	Fatty acids	
68188-40-9	Fatty acids, tall oil reaction products w/ acetophenone, formaldehyde & thiourea	
9043-30-5	Fatty alcohol polyglycol ether surfactant	
7705-08-0	Ferric chloride	
7782-63-0	Ferrous sulfate, heptahydrate	
50-00-0	Formaldehyde	
29316-47-0	Formaldehyde polymer with 4,1,1-dimethylethyl phenolmethyl oxirane	
153795-76-7	Formaldehyde, polymers with branched 4-nonylphenol, ethylene oxide and propylene oxide	
75-12-7	Formamide	
64-18-6	Formic acid	
110-17-8	Fumaric acid	
65997-17-3	Glassy calcium magnesium phosphate	
111-30-8	Glutaraldehyde	Biocide
56-81-5	Glycerol / glycerine	
9000-30-0	Guar Gum	Viscosifier
64742-94-5	Heavy aromatic petroleum naphtha	
9025-56-3	Hemicellulase	
7647-01-0	Hydrochloric acid / hydrogen chloride / muriatic acid	Toilet bowl cleaner
7722-84-1	Hydrogen peroxide	Oxidizer, polymer breaker
79-14-1	Hydroxy acetic acid	
35249-89-9	Hydroxyacetic acid ammonium salt	
9004-62-0	Hydroxyethyl cellulose	Viscosifier
5470-11-1	Hydroxylamine hydrochloride	
39421-75-5	Hydroxypropyl guar	Viscosifier
35674-56-7	Isomeric aromatic ammonium salt	
64742-88-7	Isoparaffinic petroleum hydrocarbons, synthetic	
64-63-0	Isopropanol	Solvent, pour point depressant
98-82-8	Isopropylbenzene (cumene)	
68909-80-8	Isoquinoline, reaction products with benzyl chloride and quinoline	
8008-20-6	Kerosene	
64742-81-0	Kerosine, hydrodesulfurized	
63-42-3	Lactose	
64742-95-6	Light aromatic solvent naphtha	
1120-21-4	Light paraffin oil	
14807-96-6	Magnesium silicate hydrate (talc)	Grinding aid
1184-78-7	Methanamine, N,N-dimethyl-, N-oxide	
67-56-1	Methanol	
68891-11-2	Methyloxirane polymer with oxirane, mono (nonylphenol) ether, branched	
8052-41-3	Mineral spirits / Stoddard solvent	
141-43-5	Monoethanolamine	pH buffer
44992-01-0	N,N,N-trimethyl-2[1-oxo-2-propenyl]oxy ethanaminium chloride	
64742-48-9	Naphtha (petroleum), hydrotreated heavy	
91-20-3	Naphthalene	
38640-62-9	Naphthalene bis(1-methylethyl)	
93-18-5	Naphthalene, 2-ethoxy-	
68909-18-2	N-benzyl-alkyl-pyridinium chloride	
68139-30-0	N-Cocoamidopropyl-N,N-dimethyl-N-2-hydroxypropylsulfobetaine	Wellbore cleaner
7727-37-9	Nitrogen, liquid form	
68412-54-4	Nonylphenol polyethoxylate	Wellbore cleaner
121888-66-2	Organophilic clays	Oil viscosifier
64742-65-0	Petroleum base oil	
64741-68-0	Petroleum naphtha	
70714-66-8	Phosphonic acid, (phosphonomethyl)iminobis2,1-ethanediylnitrilobis(methylene)tetrakis-, ammonium salt	
8000-41-7	Pine oil	
60828-78-6	Poly(oxy-1,2-ethanediyl), a-[3,5-dimethyl-1-(2-methylpropyl)hexyl]-w-hydroxy-	Wellbore cleaner
25322-68-3	Poly(oxy-1,2-ethanediyl), a-hydro-w-hydroxy / Polyethylene Glycol	Wellbore cleaner
24938-91-8	Poly(oxy-1,2-ethanediyl), α-tridecyl-ω-hydroxy-	Wellbore cleaner
51838-31-4	Polyepichlorohydrin, trimethylamine quaternized	
56449-46-8	Polyethlene glycol oleate ester	Lubricant
62649-23-4	Polymer with 2-propenoic acid and sodium 2-propenoate	
9005-65-6	Polyoxyethylene Sorbitan Monooleate	Dispersant
61791-26-2	Polyoxylated fatty amine salt	
127-08-2	Potassium acetate	
12712-38-8	Potassium borate	Crosslinker
1332-77-0	Potassium borate	Crosslinker
20786-60-1	Potassium Borate	Crosslinker
584-08-7	Potassium carbonate	
7447-40-7	Potassium chloride	
590-29-4	Potassium formate	
1310-58-3	Potassium hydroxide	
13709-94-9	Potassium metaborate	
24634-61-5	Potassium sorbate	Anti-oxidant
112926-00-8	Precipitated silica / silica gel	
57-55-6	Propane-1,2-diol, or Propylene glycol	
107-98-2	Propylene glycol monomethyl ether	Solvent
68953-58-2	Quaternary Ammonium Compounds	
62763-89-7	Quinoline,2-methyl-, hydrochloride	
15619-48-4	Quinolinium, 1-(phenylmethl),chloride	
7631-86-9	Silica, Dissolved	
5324-84-5	Sodium 1-octanesulfonate	
127-09-3	Sodium acetate	
95371-16-7	Sodium Alpha-olefin sulfonate	
532-32-1	Sodium benzoate	
144-55-8	Sodium bicarbonate	
7631-90-5	Sodium bisulfate	
7647-15-6	Sodium bromide	
497-19-8	Sodium carbonate	
7647-14-5	Sodium chloride	Table salt
7758-19-2	Sodium chlorite	
3926-62-3	Sodium chloroacetate	
68-04-2	Sodium citrate	
6381-77-7	Sodium erythorbate / isoascorbic acid, sodium salt	
2836-32-0	Sodium glycolate	
1310-73-2	Sodium hydroxide	
7681-52-9	Sodium hypochlorite	Bleach
7775-19-1	Sodium metaborate .8H2O	Crosslinker
10486-00-7	Sodium perborate tetrahydrate	Oxidizer
7775-27-1	Sodium persulfate	Oxidizer
9003-04-7	Sodium polyacrylate	Dispersant, flocculant
7757-82-6	Sodium sulfate	
1303-96-4	Sodium tetraborate decahydrate	Crosslinker
7772-98-7	Sodium thiosulfate	
1338-43-8	Sorbitan monooleate	Dispersant
57-50-1	Sucrose	Table sugar
5329-14-6	Sulfamic acid	pH adjuster
112945-52-5	Synthetic amorphous / pyrogenic silica / amorphous silica	
68155-20-4	Tall oil fatty acid diethanolamine	Foamer, wellbore cleaner
8052-48-0	Tallow fatty acids sodium salt	Soap
72480-70-7	Tar bases, quinoline derivs., benzyl chloride-quaternized	
68647-72-3	Terpene and terpenoids	Solvent
68956-56-9	Terpene hydrocarbon byproducts	Solvent
533-74-4	Tetrahydro-3,5-dimethyl-2H-1,3,5-thiadiazine-2-thione (a.k.a. Dazomet)	Biocide
55566-30-8	Tetrakis(hydroxymethyl)phosphonium sulfate (THPS)	Biocide
75-57-0	Tetramethyl ammonium chloride	
64-02-8	Tetrasodium ethylenediaminetetraacetate	
68-11-1	Thioglycolic acid	
62-56-6	Thiourea	
68527-49-1	Thiourea, polymer with formaldehyde and 1-phenylethanone	
108-88-3	Toluene	
81741-28-8	Tributyl tetradecyl phosphonium chloride	
68299-02-5	Triethanolamine hydroxyacetate	
112-27-6	Triethylene glycol	
52624-57-4	Trimethylolpropane, ethoxylated, propoxylated	
150-38-9	Trisodium ethylenediaminetetraacetate	
5064-31-3	Trisodium nitrilotriacetate	
7601-54-9	Trisodium orthophosphate	
57-13-6	Urea	
25038-72-6	Vinylidene chloride/methylacrylate copolymer	
7732-18-5	Water	Deionized water
1330-20-7	Xylene	Carburetor cleaner, asphalt primer, solvent
068604-95-5	Aliphatic acids	Wall & trim enamel
078330-20-8	Aliphatic ethoxylated alcohols	Leather cleaner
000000-33-9	Alkyl aryl polyethoxy alcohols	Coppersmiths polish
000000-17-6	Alkylaryl sulfonate	Detergent, stain remover
064742-47-8	Distillates, petroleum, hydrotreated light	Tar remover, sealant
000110-43-0	Methyl n-amyl & ethyl ketones	Hobby cement, sealant
	Oxyalkylated alkylphenol	
	Petroleum distillate blend	
	Polyethoxylated alkanol	
	Polymeric hydrocarbons	
	Salt of amine-carbonyl condensate	
	Salt of fatty acid/polyamine reaction product	

== See also ==
- Hydraulic fracturing
- Hydraulic fracturing in the United Kingdom
- Hydraulic fracturing in the United States
- Hydraulic fracturing proppants
- Uses of radioactivity in oil and gas wells
