= Isotopes of antimony =

Isotopes of antimony (_{51}Sb)
Main isotopes			Decay	
Isotope	abundance	half-life (t_{1/2})	mode	product
^{121}Sb	57.2%	stable		
^{123}Sb	42.8%	stable		
^{125}Sb	synth	2.758 y	β^{−}	^{125}Te

Standard atomic weight A_{r}°(Sb)
- 121.760±0.001; 121.76±0.01 (abridged)

Antimony (_{51}Sb) occurs naturally as two stable isotopes, ^{121}Sb (57.21%) and ^{123}Sb (42.79%). There are 37 artificial radioactive isotopes known with mass numbers 104 to 142, the lightest two of which (^{104-105}Sb) are beyond the proton drip line. Isotopes that are lighter than the stable isotopes tend to decay by β^{+}, and those that are heavier tend to decay by β^{−}; the intermediate ^{122}Sb is observed to decay in both ways.

The longest-lived radioisotopes of antimony are: the minor fission product ^{125}Sb, with a half-life of 2.758 years; ^{124}Sb, with half-life 60.20 days; and ^{126}Sb, with half-life 12.35 days. All other isotopes have half-lives less than 4 days, most less than an hour. Of the numerous isomers reported, the longest-lived is ^{120m1}Sb with half-life 5.76 days; this nuclide has not been confirmed not to be the ground state.

== List of isotopes ==
Nuclide (Note: ^{m}Sb – Excited nuclear isomer.)	Z	N	Isotopic mass (Da) (Note: ( ) – Uncertainty (1σ) is given in concise form in parentheses after the corresponding last digits.) (Note: # – Atomic mass marked #: value and uncertainty derived not from purely experimental data, but at least partly from trends from the Mass Surface (TMS).)	Discovery year	Half-life	Decay mode (Note: Modes of decay: EC: / Electron capture; IT: / Isomeric transition; n: / Neutron emission; p: / Proton emission)	Daughter isotope (Note: Bold italics symbol as daughter – Daughter product is nearly stable.) (Note: Bold symbol as daughter – Daughter product is stable.)	Spin and parity (Note: ( ) spin value – Indicates spin with weak assignment arguments.) (Note: # – Values marked # are not purely derived from experimental data, but at least partly from trends of neighboring nuclides (TNN).)	Natural abundance (mole fraction)	
Nuclide	Excitation energy			Discovery year	Half-life	Decay mode	Daughter isotope	Spin and parity	Normal proportion	Range of variation
^{104}Sb	51	53	103.936331(24)	1995	470(130) ms	β^{+}?	^{104}Sn			
^{104}Sb	51	53	103.936331(24)	1995	470(130) ms	p (<7%)	^{103}Sn			
^{104}Sb	51	53	103.936331(24)	1995	470(130) ms	β^{+}, p (<7%)	^{103}In			
^{104}Sb	51	53	103.936331(24)	1995	470(130) ms	α?	^{100}In			
^{105}Sb	51	54	104.931277(23)	1994	1.12(16) s	β^{+} (>99.9%)	^{105}Sn	(5/2+)		
^{105}Sb	51	54	104.931277(23)	1994	1.12(16) s	p (<0.1%)	^{104}Sn	(5/2+)		
^{105}Sb	51	54	104.931277(23)	1994	1.12(16) s	β^{+}, p?	^{104}In	(5/2+)		
^{106}Sb	51	55	105.9286380(80)	1981	0.6(2) s	β^{+}	^{106}Sn	(2+)		
^{106m}Sb	103.5(3) keV			1999	226(14) ns	IT	^{106}Sb	(4+)		
^{107}Sb	51	56	106.9241506(45)	1994	4.0(2) s	β^{+}	^{107}Sn	5/2+#		
^{108}Sb	51	57	107.9222267(59)	1976	7.4(3) s	β^{+}	^{108}Sn	(4+)		
^{109}Sb	51	58	108.9181412(57)	1976	17.2(5) s	β^{+}	^{109}Sn	5/2+#		
^{110}Sb	51	59	109.9168543(64)	1972	23.6(3) s	β^{+}	^{110}Sn	(3+)		
^{111}Sb	51	60	110.9132182(95)	1972	75(1) s	β^{+}	^{111}Sn	(5/2+)		
^{112}Sb	51	61	111.912400(19)	1959	53.5(6) s	β^{+}	^{112}Sn	(3+)		
^{112m}Sb	825.9(4) keV			1976	536(22) ns	IT	^{112}Sb	(8−)		
^{113}Sb	51	62	112.909375(18)	1958	6.67(7) min	β^{+}	^{113}Sn	5/2+		
^{114}Sb	51	63	113.909289(21)	1959	3.49(3) min	β^{+}	^{114}Sn	3+		
^{114m}Sb	495.5(7) keV			1973	219(12) μs	IT	^{114}Sb	(8−)		
^{115}Sb	51	64	114.906598(17)	1958	32.1(3) min	β^{+}	^{115}Sn	5/2+		
^{115m}Sb	2796.26(9) keV			1977	159(3) ns	IT	^{115}Sb	(19/2)−		
^{116}Sb	51	65	115.9067927(55)	1949	15.8(8) min	β^{+}	^{116}Sn	3+		
^{116m1}Sb	93.99(5) keV			1976	194(4) ns	IT	^{116}Sb	1+		
^{116m2}Sb	390(40) keV			1954	60.3(6) min	β^{+}	^{116}Sn	8−		
^{117}Sb	51	66	116.9048415(91)	1947	2.97(2) h	β^{+}	^{117}Sn	5/2+		
^{117m1}Sb	3130.76(19) keV			1970	355(17) μs	IT	^{117}Sb	(25/2)+		
^{117m2}Sb	3230.7(2) keV			1987	290(5) ns	IT	^{117}Sb	(23/2−)		
^{118}Sb	51	67	117.9055322(32)	1947	3.6(1) min	β^{+}	^{118}Sn	1+		
^{118m1}Sb	50.814(21) keV			1975	20.6(6) μs	IT	^{118}Sb	3+		
^{118m2}Sb	250(6) keV			1948	5.01(3) h	β^{+}	^{118}Sn	8−		
^{119}Sb	51	68	118.9039441(75)	1947	38.19(22) h	EC	^{119}Sn	5/2+		
^{119m1}Sb	2553.6(3) keV			1987	130(3) ns	IT	^{119}Sb	19/2−		
^{119m2}Sb	2841.7(4) keV			1979	835(81) ms	IT	^{119}Sb	25/2+		
^{120}Sb	51	69	119.9050803(77)	1937	15.89(4) min	β^{+}	^{120}Sn	1+		
^{120m1}Sb (Note: Order of ground state and isomer is uncertain.)	0(100)# keV			1948	5.76(2) d	β^{+}	^{120}Sn	8−		
^{120m2}Sb	78.16(5) keV			1976	246(2) ns	IT	^{120}Sb	(3+)		
^{120m3}Sb	2328(100)# keV			1987	400(8) ns	IT	^{120}Sb	13+		
^{121}Sb (Note: fission product)	51	70	120.9038114(27)	1922	Stable			5/2+	0.5721(5)	
^{121m}Sb	2751(17) keV			2009	179(6) μs	IT	^{121}Sb	(25/2+)		
^{122}Sb	51	71	121.9051693(27)	1939	2.7238(2) d	β^{−} (97.59%)	^{122}Te	2−		
^{122}Sb	51	71	121.9051693(27)	1939	2.7238(2) d	β^{+} (2.41%)	^{122}Sn	2−		
^{122m1}Sb	61.4131(5) keV			1962	1.86(8) μs	IT	^{122}Sb	3+		
^{122m2}Sb	137.4726(8) keV			1962	0.53(3) ms	IT	^{122}Sb	5+		
^{122m3}Sb	163.5591(17) keV			1947	4.191(3) min	IT	^{122}Sb	8−		
^{123}Sb	51	72	122.9042153(15)	1922	Stable			7/2+	0.4279(5)	
^{123m1}Sb	2237.8(3) keV			2008	214(3) ns	IT	^{123}Sb	19/2−		
^{123m2}Sb	2613.4(4) keV			2007	65(1) μs	IT	^{123}Sb	23/2+		
^{124}Sb	51	73	123.9059371(15)	1939	60.20(3) d	β^{−}	^{124}Te	3−		
^{124m1}Sb	10.8627(8) keV			1947	93(5) s	IT (75%)	^{124}Sb	5+		
^{124m1}Sb	10.8627(8) keV			1947	93(5) s	β^{−} (25%)	^{124}Te	5+		
^{124m2}Sb	36.8440(14) keV			1947	20.2(2) min	IT	^{124m1}Sb	(8)−		
^{124m3}Sb	40.8038(7) keV			1980	3.2(3) μs	IT	^{124}Sb	(3+)		
^{125}Sb	51	74	124.9052543(27)	1951	2.7576(11) y	β^{−}	^{125}Te	7/2+		
^{125m1}Sb	1971.25(20) keV			2007	4.1(2) μs	IT	^{125}Sb	15/2−		
^{125m2}Sb	2112.1(3) keV			2007	28.5(5) μs	IT	^{125}Sb	19/2−		
^{125m3}Sb	2471.0(4) keV			2007	277.0(64) ns	IT	^{125}Sb	(23/2)+		
^{126}Sb	51	75	125.907253(34)	1956	12.35(6) d	β^{−}	^{126}Te	8−		
^{126m1}Sb	17.7(3) keV			1961	19.15(8) min	β^{−} (86%)	^{126}Te	5+		
^{126m1}Sb	17.7(3) keV			1961	19.15(8) min	IT (14%)	^{126}Sb	5+		
^{126m2}Sb	40.4(3) keV			1976	~11 s	IT	^{126m1}Sb	3−		
^{126m3}Sb	104.6(3) keV			1971	553(5) ns	IT	^{126}Sb	3+		
^{126m4}Sb	1810.7(17) keV			2019	90(16) ns	IT	^{126}Sb	(13+)		
^{127}Sb	51	76	126.9069256(55)	1939	3.85(5) d	β^{−}	^{127}Te	7/2+		
^{127m1}Sb	1920.19(21) keV			1974	11.7(1) μs	IT	^{127}Sb	15/2−		
^{127m2}Sb	2324.7(4) keV			2005	269(5) ns	IT	^{127}Sb	23/2+		
^{128}Sb	51	77	127.909146(20)	1956	9.05(4) h	β^{−}	^{128}Te	8−		
^{128m1}Sb	10(6) keV			1956	10.41(18) min	β^{−} (96.4%)	^{128}Te	5+		
^{128m1}Sb	10(6) keV			1956	10.41(18) min	IT (3.6%)	^{128}Sb	5+		
^{128m2}Sb	1617.3(7) keV			2019	500(20) ns	IT	^{128}Sb	(11+)		
^{128m3}Sb	1769.9(12) keV			2019	217(7) ns	IT	^{128}Sb	(13+)		
^{129}Sb	51	78	128.909147(23)	1939	4.366(26) h	β^{−}	^{129}Te	7/2+		
^{129m1}Sb	1851.31(6) keV			1982	17.7(1) min	β^{−} (85%)	^{129}Te	19/2−		
^{129m1}Sb	1851.31(6) keV			1982	17.7(1) min	IT (15%)	^{129}Sb	19/2−		
^{129m2}Sb	1861.06(5) keV			1987	2.23(17) μs	IT	^{129}Sb	15/2−		
^{129m3}Sb	2139.4(3) keV			2003	0.89(3) μs	IT	^{129}Sb	23/2+		
^{130}Sb	51	79	129.911663(15)	1962	39.5(8) min	β^{−}	^{130}Te	8−		
^{130m1}Sb	4.80(20) keV			1962	6.3(2) min	β^{−}	^{130}Te	4+		
^{130m2}Sb	84.67(4) keV			2002	800(100) ns	IT	^{130}Sb	6−		
^{130m3}Sb	1508(1) keV			2019	600(15) ns	IT	^{130}Sb	(11+)		
^{130m4}Sb	1544.7(5) keV			2002	1.25(1) μs	IT	^{130}Sb	(13+)		
^{131}Sb	51	80	130.9119893(22)	1956	23.03(4) min	β^{−}	^{131}Te	7/2+		
^{131m1}Sb	1676.06(6) keV			1977	64.2(26) μs	IT	^{131}Sb	15/2−		
^{131m2}Sb	1687.2(9) keV			2000	4.3(8) μs	IT	^{131}Sb	19/2−		
^{131m3}Sb	2165.6(15) keV			2000	0.97(3) μs	IT	^{131}Sb	23/2+		
^{132}Sb	51	81	131.9145141(29)	1956	2.79(7) min	β^{−}	^{132}Te	(4)+		
^{132m1}Sb	139.3(20) keV			1974	4.10(5) min	β^{−}	^{132}Te	(8−)		
^{132m2}Sb	254.5(3) keV			1989	102(4) ns	IT	^{132}Sb	(6−)		
^{133}Sb	51	82	132.9152721(34)	1966	2.34(5) min	β^{−}	^{133}Te	(7/2+)		
^{133m}Sb	4541(9) keV			1978	16.54(19) μs	IT	^{133}Sb	(21/2+)		
^{134}Sb	51	83	133.9205373(33)	1967	674(4) ms	β^{−}	^{134}Te	(0-)		
^{134}Sb	51	83	133.9205373(33)	1967	674(4) ms	β^{−}, n?	^{133}Te	(0-)		
^{134m}Sb	279(1) keV			1972	10.01(4) s	β^{−} (99.91%)	^{134}Te	(7−)		
^{134m}Sb	279(1) keV			1972	10.01(4) s	β^{−}, n (0.088%)	^{133}Te	(7−)		
^{135}Sb	51	84	134.9251844(28)	1964	1.668(9) s	β^{−} (80.9%)	^{135}Te	(7/2+)		
^{135}Sb	51	84	134.9251844(28)	1964	1.668(9) s	β^{−}, n (19.1%)	^{134}Te	(7/2+)		
^{136}Sb	51	85	135.9307490(63)	1976	0.923(14) s	β^{−} (75.2%)	^{136}Te	(1−)		
^{136}Sb	51	85	135.9307490(63)	1976	0.923(14) s	β^{−}, n (24.7%)	^{135}Te	(1−)		
^{136}Sb	51	85	135.9307490(63)	1976	0.923(14) s	β^{−}, 2n (0.14%)	^{134}Te	(1−)		
^{136m}Sb	269.3(5) keV			2001	570(5) ns	IT	^{136}Sb	(6−)		
^{137}Sb	51	86	136.935523(56)	1994	497(21) ms	β^{−} (51%)	^{137}Te	7/2+#		
^{137}Sb	51	86	136.935523(56)	1994	497(21) ms	β^{−}, n (49%)	^{136}Te	7/2+#		
^{137}Sb	51	86	136.935523(56)	1994	497(21) ms	β^{−}, 2n?	^{135}Te	7/2+#		
^{138}Sb	51	87	137.94133(32)#	1994	333(7) ms	β^{−}, n (72%)	^{137}Te	(3−)		
^{138}Sb	51	87	137.94133(32)#	1994	333(7) ms	β^{−} (28%)	^{138}Te	(3−)		
^{138}Sb	51	87	137.94133(32)#	1994	333(7) ms	β^{−}, 2n?	^{136}Te	(3−)		
^{139}Sb	51	88	138.94627(43)#	1994	182(9) ms	β^{−}, n (90%)	^{138}Te	7/2+#		
^{139}Sb	51	88	138.94627(43)#	1994	182(9) ms	β^{−} (10%)	^{139}Te	7/2+#		
^{139}Sb	51	88	138.94627(43)#	1994	182(9) ms	β^{−}, 2n?	^{137}Te	7/2+#		
^{140}Sb	51	89	139.95235(64)#	2010	170(6) ms	β^{−} (69%)	^{140}Te	(3−)		
^{140}Sb	51	89	139.95235(64)#	2010	170(6) ms	β^{−}, n (23%)	^{139}Te	(3−)		
^{140}Sb	51	89	139.95235(64)#	2010	170(6) ms	β^{−}, 2n (7.6%)	^{138}Te	(3−)		
^{140m}Sb	330(30)# keV			2016	41(8) μs	IT	^{140}Sb	(6−,7−)		
^{141}Sb	51	90	140.95755(54)#	2015	103(29) ms	β^{−}	^{141}Te	7/2+#		
^{141}Sb	51	90	140.95755(54)#	2015	103(29) ms	β^{−}, n?	^{140}Te	7/2+#		
^{141}Sb	51	90	140.95755(54)#	2015	103(29) ms	β^{−}, 2n?	^{139}Te	7/2+#		
^{142}Sb	51	91	141.96392(32)#	2018	80(50) ms	β^{−}	^{142}Te			
^{142}Sb	51	91	141.96392(32)#	2018	80(50) ms	β^{−}, n?	^{141}Te			
^{142}Sb	51	91	141.96392(32)#	2018	80(50) ms	β^{−}, 2n?	^{140}Te			
This table header & footer:

== See also ==
Daughter products other than antimony

- Isotopes of tellurium
- Isotopes of tin
- Isotopes of indium
