= Geology of Lancashire =

Geology of English county

This article covers the modern ceremonial county of Lancashire which includes the boroughs of Blackpool and Blackburn with Darwen but not those southern parts of the historic county of Lancashire which have since 1974 formed a part of the counties of Merseyside and Greater Manchester nor the northernmost part which now forms a part of Cumbria.

The geology of Lancashire in northwest England consists in the main of Carboniferous age rocks but with Triassic sandstones and mudstones at or near the surface of the lowlands bordering the Irish Sea though these are largely obscured by Quaternary deposits.

== Silurian ==
A small fault-bounded area of rocks of Wenlock age lies to the north of Ireby in the extreme north of the county.

== Carboniferous ==
Rocks originating in the Carboniferous Period underlie the uplands of eastern and north Lancashire. Listed in order of succession i.e. lowermost/oldest first, they comprise the various limestones, mudstones, siltstones and sandstones of the Bowland High Group and Trawden Limestone Group, Craven Group, Millstone Grit Group, Pennine Coal Measures Group and Warwickshire Group.

=== Stratigraphy ===
The Bowland High Group is bundled together with the Trawden Limestone Group in the Carboniferous Limestone Supergroup. Together they include sedimentary sequences developed during the Tournaisian on isolated structural highs or horsts, namely the Bowland High and the Central Lancashire High. The Bowland High Group comprises the older Chatburn Limestone Formation and the younger Clitheroe Limestone Formation. These are largely limestone sequences but with subordinate mudstones and siltstones. The Trawden Limestone Group is not known at the surface but is proved in numerous boreholes. It is not divided into formations.

The overlying Craven Group comprises, again in stratigraphic order, the Hodder Mudstone, Hodderense Limestone, Pendleside Limestone and Bowland Shale Formations. These are of Visean and earliest Namurian age. Older texts refer instead to a Worston Shale Group comprising the first three of the above formations (and including the Clitheroe Limestone Formation), and an overlying Bowland Shale Group comprising a Lower and an Upper Bowland Shale.

The Millstone Grit Group comprises the Pendleton, Silsden, Samlesbury, Hebden, Marsden and Rossendale formations. This succession of sandstones and mudstones was deposited during Namurian times. The sandstones of the Rossendale Formation have been widely quarried for building purposes; Rossendale Flags are found as paving widely across the region. Older texts subdivide the Millstone Grit in different ways.

The sandstones, mudstones and coals of the Pennine Coal Measures Group form the Lancashire Coalfield which includes both the Burnley Coalfield and the South Lancashire Coalfield. Both were economically important to Lancashire's economy during the nineteenth and twentieth centuries. The Group is divided into Lower, Middle and Upper formations, all dating from the Westphalian. These are in turn overlain by the Etruria and Halesowen formations of the Warwickshire Group.

=== Landscape features ===
Longridge Fell is formed in the Pendle Grit. Strata dip locally to the south and south-east presenting a prominent northwest-facing scarp. Pendle Hill is similarly formed from these erosion-resistant sandstones. The southern part of the Forest of Bowland, including the prominent Parlick together with the isolated Beacon Fell are also formed from the Pendle Grit. The Ward's Stone Sandstone Formation forms the western parts of these fells whilst to the north-east it is the Dure Clough Sandstone which forms the plateau surface.

The Arnside and Silverdale AONB, the southern half of which is within Lancashire is formed by a succession of limestones assigned to the Great Scar Limestone Group. Warton Crag and Jack Scout, a National Trust property, are prominent features in the locality where the limestone is well exposed.

Leck Fell is an area of limestone moorland west of the hill of Gragareth, the county's highest point, close to the border with both North Yorkshire and Cumbria. A succession of limestones assigned to the Great Scar Limestone Group and Yoredale Group are host to numerous cave systems. The summit area is formed in rocks of the Alston and Pendleton formations.

Billinge Hill, Blackburn near Blackburn is formed by the Revidge Grit whilst the nearby Hoghton Tower stands on a lower hill formed by the same Namurian age rock, one of a series of sandstones within the Millstone Grit. Anglezarke Moor and Withnell Moor are formed by the Fletcher Bank, Helmshore and Brooksbottoms grits.

The fells to the south of Slaidburn, including Easington, Waddington and Birkett fells are formed from the Warley Wise Grit. It was formerly quarried beside the B6478 road in this vicinity.

== Permian ==
A small area of rocks originating in the Permian Period occurs near Lancaster, Morecambe and Glasson Dock though it is entirely obscured by recent deposits and is known only from borehole cores. These are the Collyhurst Sandstone of the Appleby Group and the sandstones, mudstones and evaporites of the overlying Cumbrian Coast Group. There are also narrow bands of these rocks (Manchester Marls and Collyhurst Sandstone) to the north and south of Preston though again they are generally buried beneath glacial till. Another small outlier of early/lower Permian rocks is centred on the village of Ireby and extends across the county boundary into North Yorkshire.

== Triassic ==
Lancashire's coastal plain is underlain by sedimentary rocks laid down during the Triassic Period comprising sandstones, siltstones and mudstones though outcrops are restricted to those areas which are not covered by thick superficial deposits. Within the Kirkham basin, the following Triassic sequence is known from boreholes:

- Mercia Mudstone Group (subdivided thus:)
  - Breckells Mudstones
  - Kirkham Mudstones
  - Singeton Mudstones
  - Hambleton Mudstones
- Sherwood Sandstone Group

The lowermost part of the Sherwood Sandstone Group is of Permian age. The two groups as currently defined replace earlier terminology which referred to the Bunter Sandstone, Keuper Sandstone and Keuper Marl. A small outlier of Sherwood Sandstone Group rocks occurs at the surface at Skelmersdale.

The Preesall Salt occurs within the Kirkham Mudstones in a syncline beneath Preesall and the River Wyre. At least 185m thickness of halite with some mudstone is known to exist. There is also some salt present in the overlying Breckells Mudstones.

== Palaeogene ==
Caton Dyke, a dyke of olivine alkali basalt intrudes Carboniferous strata east of Caton. Its alignment is roughly similar to that of numerous faults in the area and is seen to vary in width from over 5m to just 60 cm across its three known exposures. It is considered that it may form a part of the dyke swarm associated with the Isle of Mull off the west coast of Scotland. It is thought to be continuous with Grindleton Dyke in the Clitheroe area.

== Geological structure ==
Much of the county occupies the Craven Basin, a depositional basin active during the Carboniferous period. It is bounded to the north by the Lake District block and to the southeast by the Central Lancashire High. To the northeast the Craven Fault System marks the edge of the Askrigg Block. Within the basin a couple of sub-basins are recognised; the Lancaster Fells sub-basin and Bowland sub-basin (or 'Bowland Trough'), separated by the 'Bowland High' and 'South Fells Tilt Block'. Rocks in the area, especially within the latter sub-basin were folded during the Variscan Orogeny to form the Ribblesdale Fold Belt which is aligned broadly southwest - northeast. Further south is the Rossendale Basin.

In the west of the county, the West Lancashire basin is in effect a landward extension of the East Irish Sea Basin. The area is threaded by numerous broadly north-south aligned normal faults thought to have been active during Permo-Triassic times and perhaps later, in association with early rifting of the Atlantic Ocean.

== Quaternary ==
=== Glacial legacy ===
The larger part of lowland Lancashire i.e. the West Lancashire Coastal Plain, The Fylde and adjoining areas is covered by a thick mantle of glacial till. These deposits are the legacy of the over-riding of the area on several occasions by glacial ice during the past 2 million years. The present distribution of deposits and the landforms to which they give rise are largely the result of the last ice age, the Devensian which peaked around 22-20,000 years ago. Drumlins caused by the moulding of sub-glacial sediments are a significant feature of the landscape in the north of the county.

=== Alluvium ===
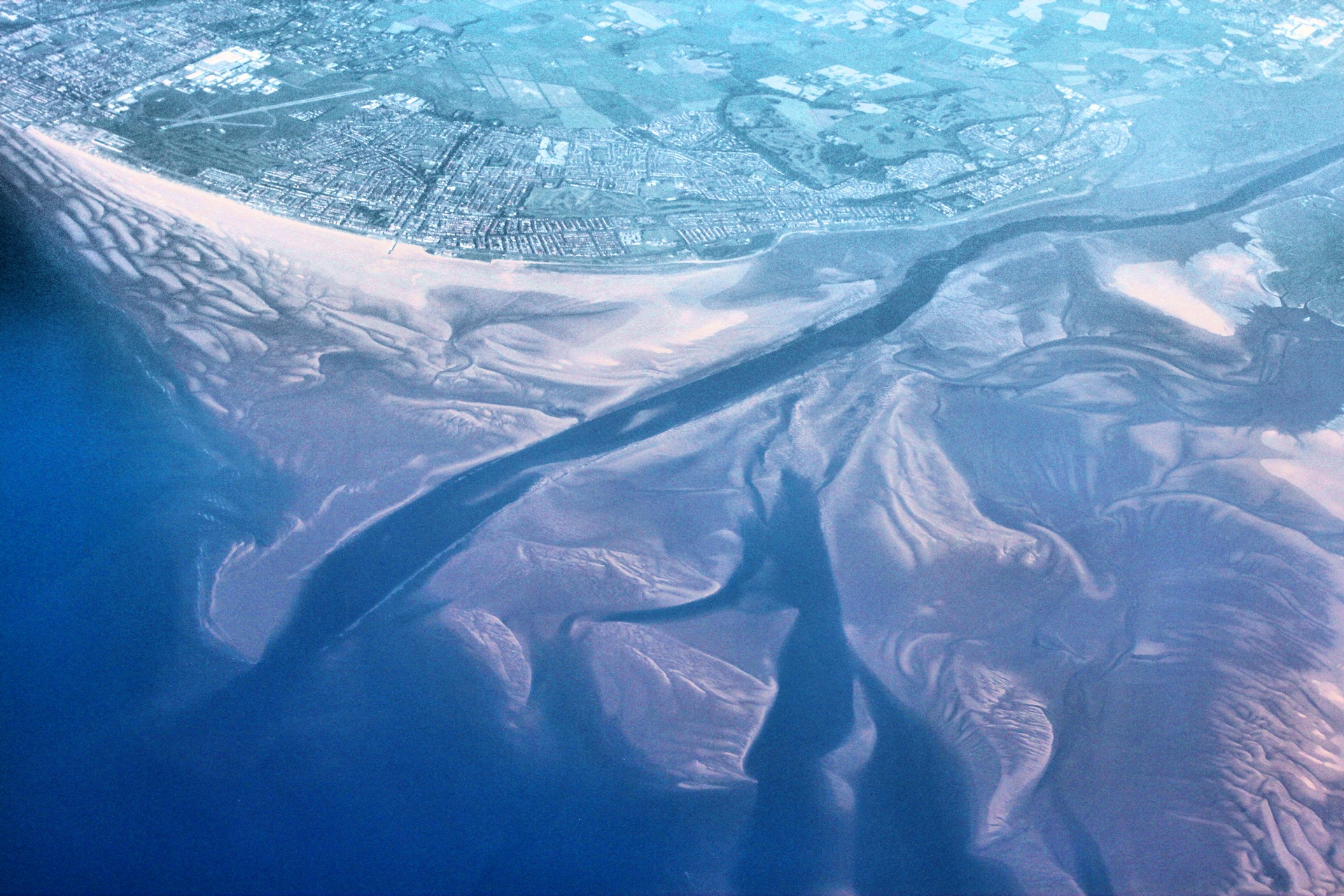
Ribble estuarine alluvium

Significant areas of marine and estuarine alluvium, typically silt and clay, extend around Ribble estuary north from Southport and also around the southern shores of Morecambe Bay from Cleveleys and Fleetwood east through Preesall then north via Glasson to Morecambe. Narrower bands of these deposits fringe the coast between Hest Bank and Carnforth. River alluvium is characteristic of the floodplains of the River Wyre and its major tributary, the River Brock.

=== Blown sand ===
Extensive areas of blown sand have been mapped along the coastal zone south from Blackpool through Lytham St Annes. Narrower belts of these deposits also characterise the north coast of Fylde at Fleetwood and Preesall and a rather smaller area west of Sunderland Point. Considerable areas in the south of the county around Ormskirk are characterised by blown sand, referred to here as the Shirdley Hill Sand. After the ice sheets had melted away from the Irish Sea but before vegetation had taken hold and before the sea re-flooded that basin, blowing sand drifted across the area to form a sheetlike deposit up to 2.5m thick in places.

=== Peat ===
Peat deposits are common in the county and can be divided into areas of 'lowland moss' and 'hill peat'. Large swathes of the Forest of Bowland are covered in peat and there are smaller patches elsewhere as at Pendle Hill. Lowland examples include Stalmine Moss, Rawcliffe Moss, Winmarleigh and Cockerham mosses west of Garstang. There is also a large area east of Southport where extensive raised bogs have been drained. Many have been thoroughly exploited.

=== Karst and cave development ===
There has been development of cave systems in parts of the county where limestone is present. Of particular note is the Three Counties System which, besides Lancashire, underlies neighbouring parts of North Yorkshire and Cumbria. At over 86 km in length it is the most extensive cave network known in Britain and ranks 27th longest in the world. Various individually named caves beneath Leck Fell link underground to form the wider system. These include Ease Gill Caverns, Lost John's Cave and Ireby Fell Cavern.

=== Landslides ===
Numerous examples of landslides occur around the east of the county. A study in the Forest of Rossendale by the British Geological Survey revealed three main types of occurrence, namely those associated with:

- the over-deepening of valleys by glaciers and glacial meltwater
- drift-filled valleys
- faulting

They range from rotational ones, often multiple in nature to simple topples and rock falls. The Cliviger valley is particularly affected by landslips which have occurred in the post-glacial period.

== See also ==
- Geology of the United Kingdom
- Geology of England
- List of geology of English counties
- Geology of Cheshire
- Geology of Yorkshire
