= Geology of Yorkshire =

Geology of region in England

The Geology of Yorkshire in northern England shows a very close relationship between the major topographical areas and the geological period in which their rocks were formed. The rocks of the Pennine chain of hills in the west are of Carboniferous origin whilst those of the central vale are Permo-Triassic. The North York Moors in the north-east of the county are Jurassic in age while the Yorkshire Wolds to the south east are Cretaceous chalk uplands. The plain of Holderness and the Humberhead levels both owe their present form to the Quaternary ice ages. The strata become gradually younger from west to east.

Much of Yorkshire presents heavily glaciated scenery as few places escaped the direct or indirect impact of the great ice sheets as they first advanced and then retreated during the last ice age.

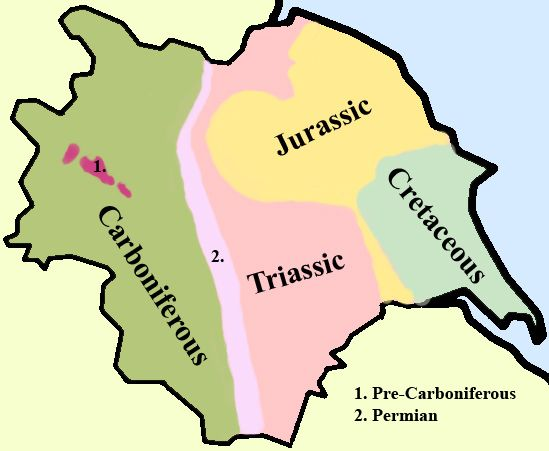
A simplified geology of Yorkshire

== The evolution of the landscape ==
=== Pre-Carboniferous ===
The oldest rocks in Yorkshire are represented by a number of small inliers of Palaeozoic areas along the southern margin of the Askrigg Block to the north of the Craven faults. This Ingletonian group of folded and cleaved mudstones and sandstones is of disputed age but fossils equate them with the Lower Skiddaw Group of the Lake District which are Ordovician. These rocks were laid down when the area was part of the Avalonia land mass and was positioned about 30° south of the equator.

By the end of the Ordovician period the Avalonian land mass had collided with Baltica and this event caused a marine regression which was exacerbated by a worldwide drop in sea level caused by a period of glaciation.

During the Silurian period Avalonia and Baltica moved rapidly towards Laurentia at a position about 20° south of the equator. The Iapetus Ocean which lay between them was closed. Inliers of the Silurian rocks which were formed at this time occur at Cross Fell, adjacent to the Pennine Fault, and at Horton in Ribblesdale and Austwick, north of the Craven Fault System.

In the following Devonian period the land area which is now Yorkshire was in a continental, inland, phase of deposition. There are no proven remaining Devonian deposits in the Yorkshire area and the Carboniferous rocks lie unconformably on the Silurian.

=== Carboniferous ===
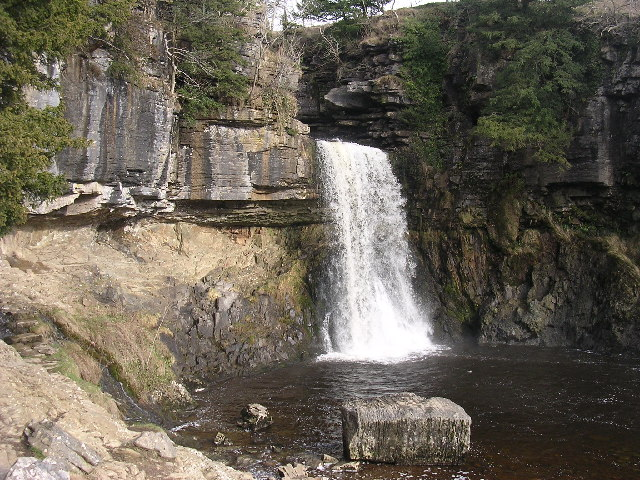
At Thornton Force the Carboniferous strata lie unconformably on older strata

Carboniferous deposits were laid down on and between large pre-existing land blocks and intervening troughs. The blocks are known as the Askrigg and Alston blocks. These upstanding areas and the troughs between were actively subsiding into shallow seas which were the result of a global rise in sea levels. These seas contained high levels of calcium carbonate and calcium forming fossils. There are areas of reef deposition around the blocks where the seas were temporarily shallower. The land mass was by now astride the equator. The bordering seas began to be periodically invaded by deltas formed by rivers flowing from the adjacent higher ground. The sand of the deltas became the Millstone Grits of the Yorkshire Pennines. The climate then became humid and the delta areas started to support swamps and tropical rain forests. These deltas changed size and shape frequently and were regularly inundated by the sea. They would eventually form the numerous coal seams of the Coal Measures sandstones. The Variscan orogeny occurred towards the end of the Carboniferous period as the former supercontinents of Gondwanaland and Euramerica collided to form the single supercontinent of Pangea. The seas between the land masses were closed up and fold mountain ranges were formed along the closure line in many areas. The area of Britain was uplifted and fault lines developed.

=== Permo-Triassic ===
Yorkshire lay in the arid hinterland of Pangea, between 20° and 30° north of the equator. The rocks of this period are dominated by red desert sandstones. The area which is now beneath the North Sea was a dry area of subsidence which was filled with a great thickness of wind-blown sands. Later a marine transgression from the north established a shallow saline sea which produced a thickness of dolomitic limestone and significant evaporite deposits as it dried up. This Zechstein Sea had completely evaporated by the end of the Permian. At the end of the Permian 95 per cent of animals and plants throughout the world became extinct. During the following Triassic period a hot and mainly arid climate continued but with flash floods from the south which deposited pebble beds in the mainly wind-deposited Sherwood sandstones. Another mass extinction at the end of this period saw 80 per cent of species disappear from earth.

At the end of the Triassic the Rhaetic ocean spread its shallow waters over the deserts to start the Jurassic period.

=== Jurassic ===
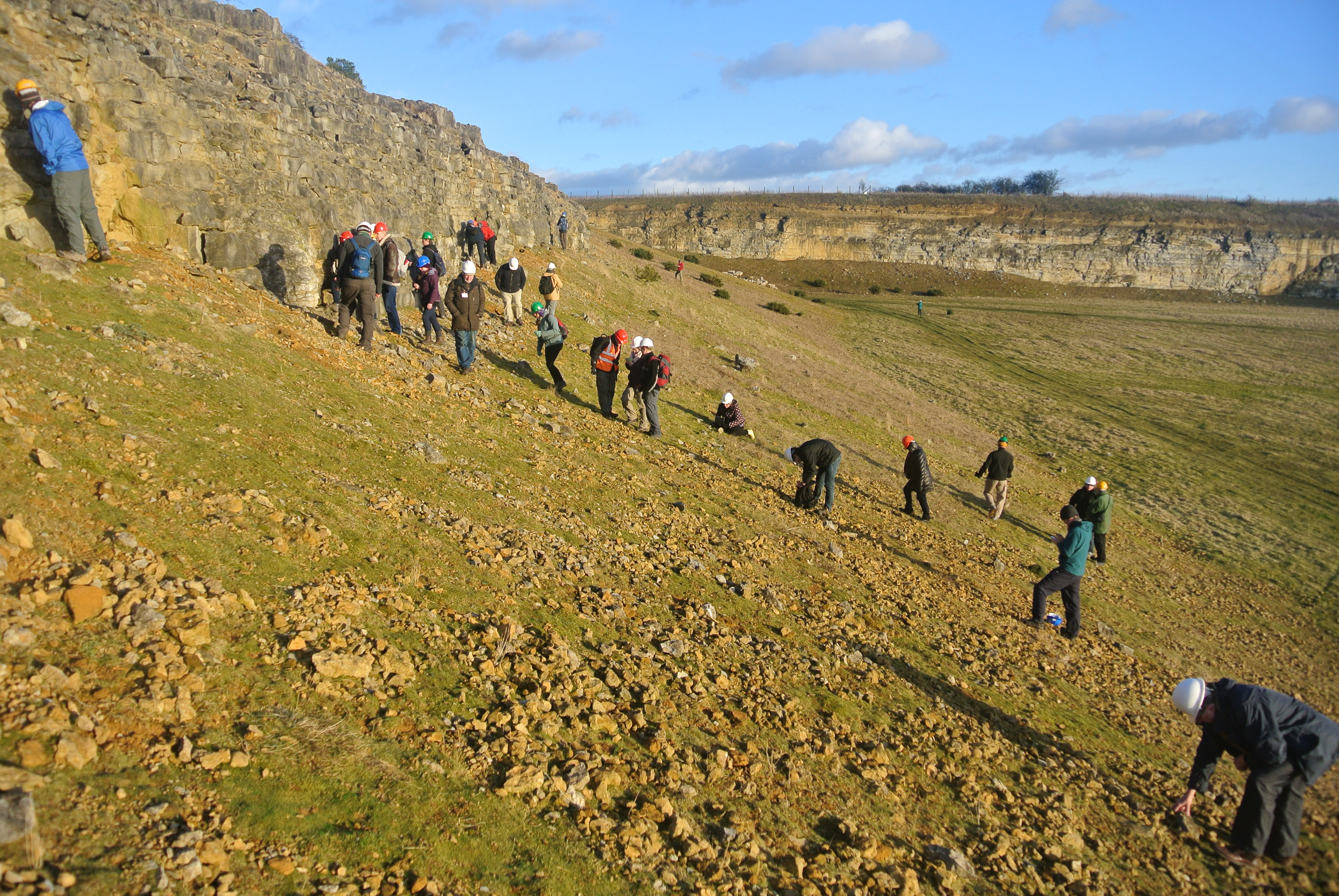
Coralline Oolite Formation (Upper Jurassic, Oxfordian) in Spaunton Quarry, Yorkshire.

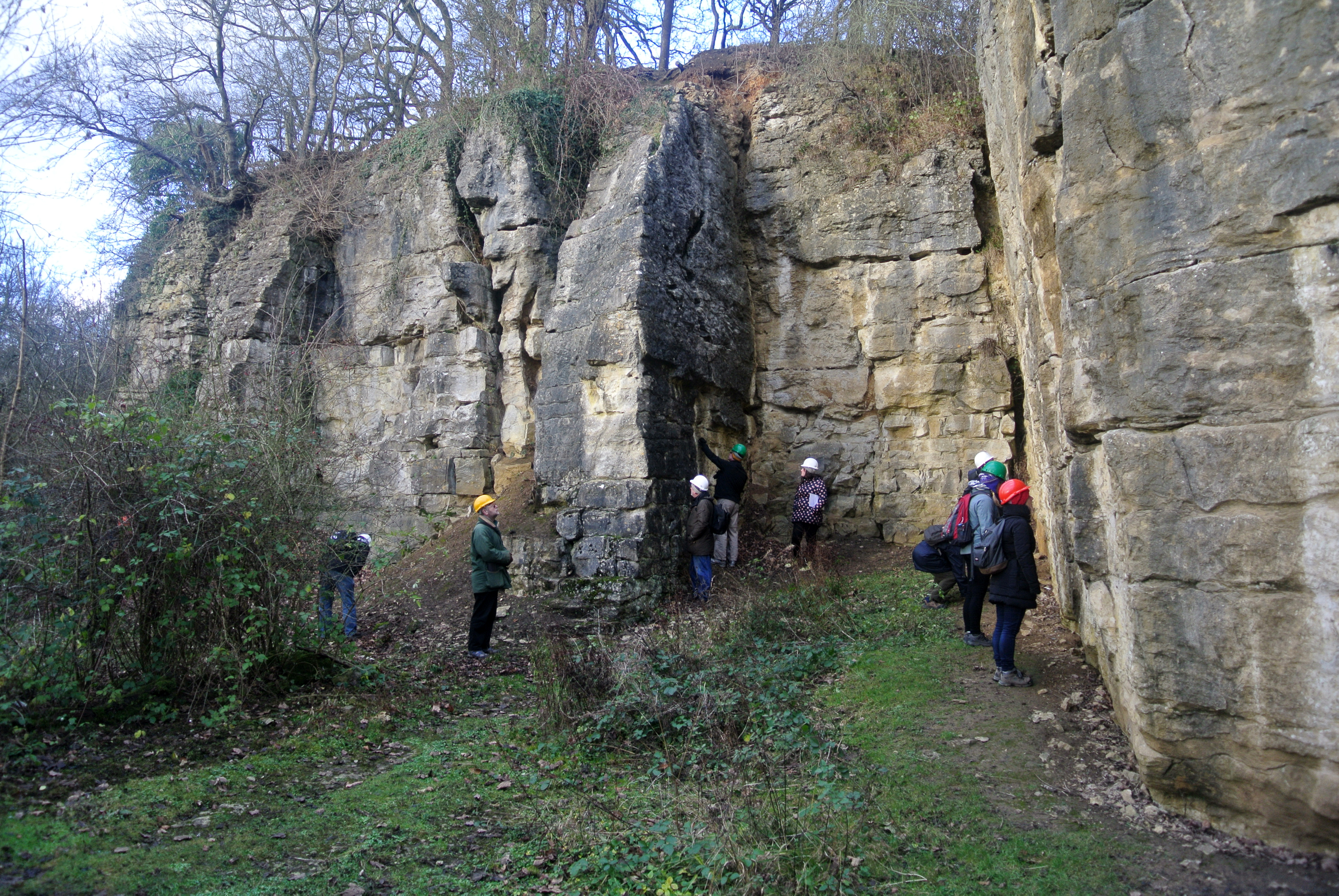
Malton Oolite (Upper Jurassic, Oxfordian) in Ravenswick Quarry, Yorkshire.

A shallow epicontinental sea, normally less than 100m deep, spread over the British area during this period. Britain at this time lay between 30° and 40° north of the equator. However, the Pennines, along with parts of Wales and Scotland were probably above sea level for most of the time. During the early and middle Jurassic an area of uplift around Market Weighton affected the way that sediments were deposited causing thinner bands of Jurassic rocks to be formed immediately north and south of the uplifted block.

The main area of Jurassic deposition in Yorkshire was the North York Moors.

- Lower Jurassic At the beginning of the Jurassic period shales, clays and thin limestones and sandstones were deposited in a shallow sea. These deposits are many metres thick and include layers of ironstone of various thicknesses and the rocks from which alum is extracted.
- Middle Jurassic A period of gradual uplift happened when mudstone and sandstone were deposited on a low-lying coastal plain crossed by large rivers. Occasionally this land area was inundated by the sea and at these times calcareous rocks containing marine fossils were deposited. These are the Ravenscar Group of rocks. The Oxford Clay was deposited at the end of this era.
- Upper Jurassic Towards the end of the Jurassic period the land again sank beneath the sea. At first the sea was shallow and calcareous sandstones and limestones were deposited. These are the Corallian rocks of the Tabular Hills towards the south of the area. Overlying the Corallian rocks is the Kimmeridge Clay which underlies the Vale of Pickering but this is not exposed on the surface.

Marine conditions continued into the Cretaceous period in the Yorkshire area.

=== Cretaceous ===
The Cretaceous period lasted for 80 million years. It was during this time that the North Atlantic was formed as North America and Europe drifted apart. To the north of the Market Weighton block only small amounts of deposit were laid down in the early part of the Cretaceous. These were the Speeton clays which are 100m thick and lie directly on the Jurassic deposits at Filey Bay. Above this clay is a 14m thick layer of red chalk coloured by impurities washing from the land. Later in the Cretaceous seawater covered the whole of southern Britain and deposited a layer of chalk up to 550m thick forming a great swathe from Flamborough Head to the Channel coast. At the end of the Cretaceous period there was another mass extinction of life with 75 per cent of all life becoming extinct, including the dinosaurs.

=== Paleogene and Neogene ===
During the Paleogene and Neogene, the British land mass drifted northwards from 40°N to its present latitude. It was also moved eastwards by the widening of the Atlantic Ocean and there was violent volcanic activity over north west Britain. It was in this period that the Cleveland Dyke was formed, originating from volcanic activity near the Scottish island of Mull. The highlands and lowlands of Britain assumed their present relative positions by the late Neogene, about 2 million years ago.

=== Quaternary ===
Towards the end of the Tertiary period there were repeated cycles of warmer and cooler climate. Each cycle had a period of about 10,000 years and they became more pronounced in the last two million years. Seventeen cycles of cold and temperate climate are recognised in Britain with three positive episodes of actual glaciation being confirmed. The latest glacial episode destroyed much of the evidence for former ones but traces do exist. On each occasion ice fields formed on the higher land and sent glaciers down the main valleys. There was scouring of material from the valley sides by the glaciers and this was deposited on lower ground as the ice retreated when the climate became warmer. In Yorkshire the higher land of the North York Moors stood proud of the glaciers, the Pennine valleys show classic glacial features and there was abundant deposition in the Vale of York and Holderness as the ice melted.

== Topography ==
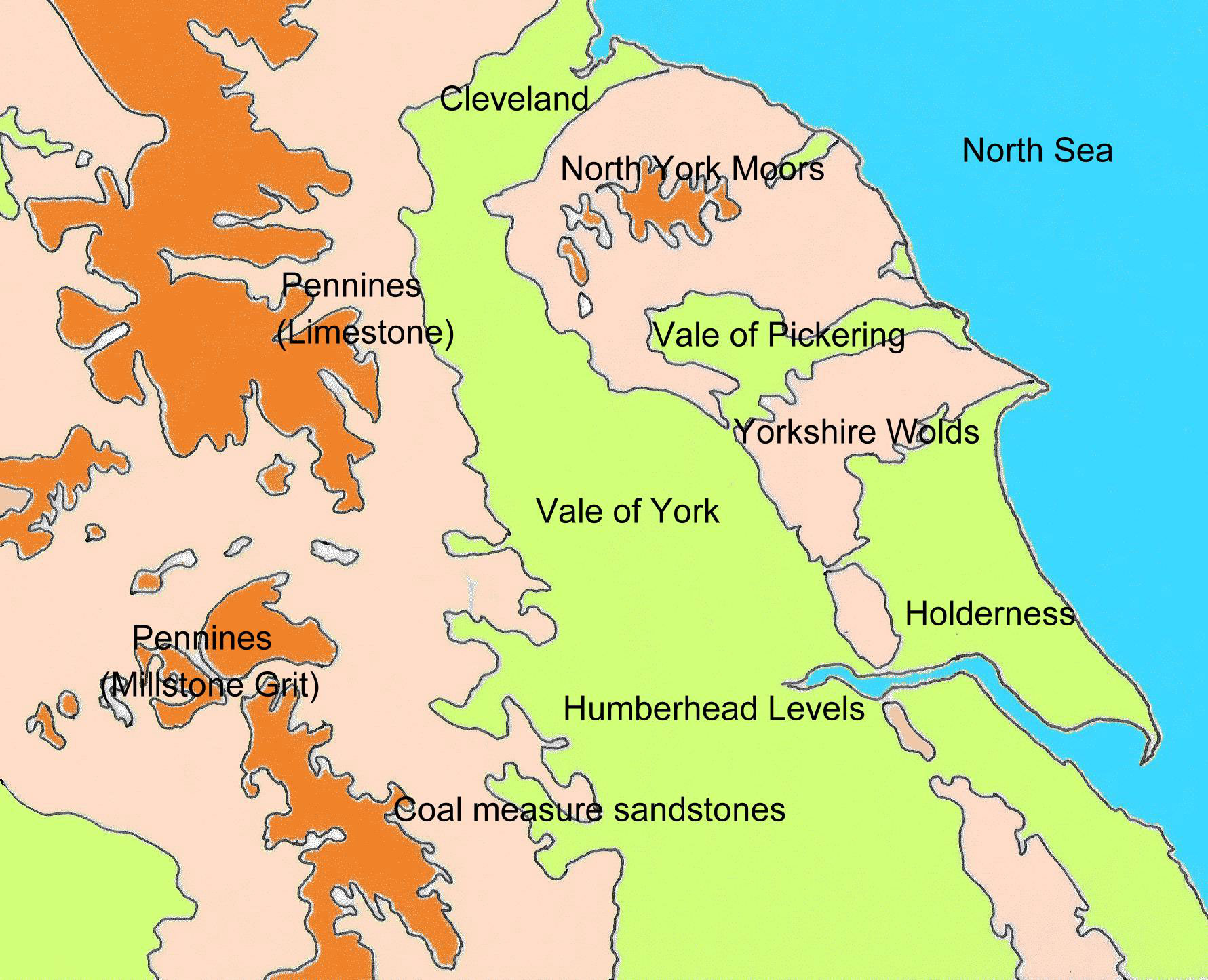
The topography of Yorkshire

=== The Pennines ===
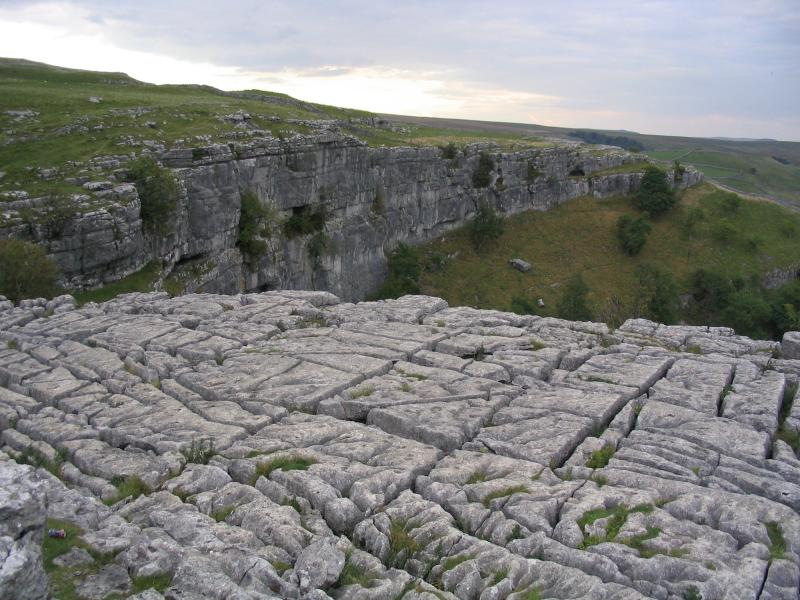
Limestone pavement above Malham Cove

The Pennines form an anticline which extends in a north–south direction, consisting of Millstone Grit and the underlying Carboniferous Limestone. The limestone is exposed at the surface to the north of the range in the North Pennines AONB. In the Yorkshire Dales this limestone exposure has led to the formation of large cave systems and watercourses, known as "gills" and "pots". These potholes are more prevalent on the eastern side and are amongst the largest in England; notable examples are the chasms of Gaping Gill, which is over 350 ft (107 m) deep and Rowten Pot, which is 365 ft (111 m) deep. The presence of limestone has also led to some unusual geological formations in the region, such as the limestone pavements of the Yorkshire Pennines. Between the Northern and Southern areas of exposed limestone, between Skipton and the Peak, lies a narrow belt of gritstone country. Here the shales and sandstones of the Millstone Grit form high hills occupied by moors and peat-mosses with the higher ground being uncultivable and barely fit for pastures.

The landscape of the Pennines is generally upland areas of high moorland indented by the more fertile valleys of the region's various rivers.

=== The Yorkshire Coalfield ===
The coalfield area is underlain by Coal Measures which consist mainly of mudstone with beds of sandstone and many seams of coal. The sandstones resist erosion so they form a recurring pattern of escarpments that stand out from the shallow mudstone floors of the valleys. The major rivers crossing the area have carved broad valleys which have been glaciated and are floored by fertile alluvial deposits.

=== The Magnesian Limestone Belt ===
The Magnesian Limestone belt forms a narrow north–south oriented strip of undulating land on the eastern edge of the Pennines overlooking the Vale of York. The magnesian limestone deposits were laid down in an evaporating inland sea in the Permian period. They are made up of a lower layer of dolomite and dolomitic limestone, which form the dominant landscape feature, overlain by red mudstone with gypsum. The upper layer is made of a similar sequence. There are numerous swallow holes caused by the underground dissolution of limestone and gypsum. The sequence can be seen clearly where it is cut by rivers in the Nidd gorge at Knaresborough, the Wharfe valley at Wetherby and the Don gorge near Doncaster. The York and Escrick glacial moraines swing north and merge north of Wetherby to cover the magnesian limestone with glacial deposits. In the Bedale area and northwards, these deposits are so extensive as to mask the limestone topography. South of Wetherby there is only a thin layer of glacial deposits overlying the limestone. The soils here are from the limestone and clay deposits and are generally very fertile.

=== The Vales of Mowbray and York ===
Beneath the drift deposits of the Vale of York lie Triassic sandstone and mudstone, and lower Jurassic mudstone but these are completely masked by the surface deposits. These deposits include glacial till, sand and gravel and both terminal and recessional moraines left by receding ice sheets at the end of the last ice age. The Escrick moraine extends across the vale from west to east and the York moraine, 8 miles further north, forms a similar curving ridge from York eastwards to Sand Hutton. To the north of these ridges are deposits of clay, sand and gravel left by a glacial lake. There are also areas of river alluvium consisting of clay, silt and sand deposited by the main rivers and streams.

=== The North York Moors ===
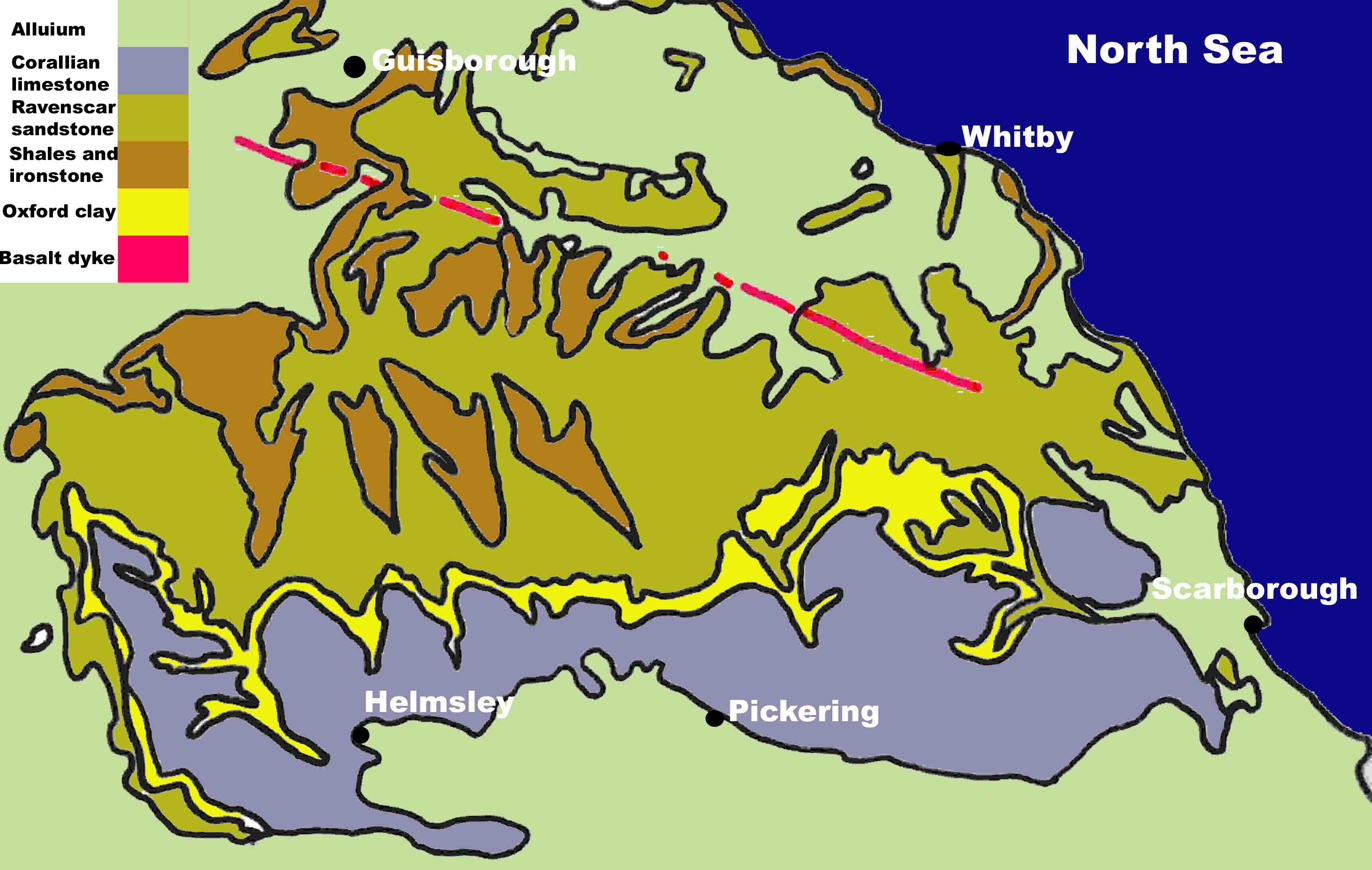
Simplified geology of the North York Moors

The geology of the North York Moors is dominated by rocks of the Jurassic period. They were mostly laid down in tropical seas 205 to 142 million years ago. Fluctuations in sea level produced different rock types varying from shales to sandstones and limestones derived from coral. These marine and delta deposited rocks are superbly exposed on the Yorkshire coast from Staithes to Filey.

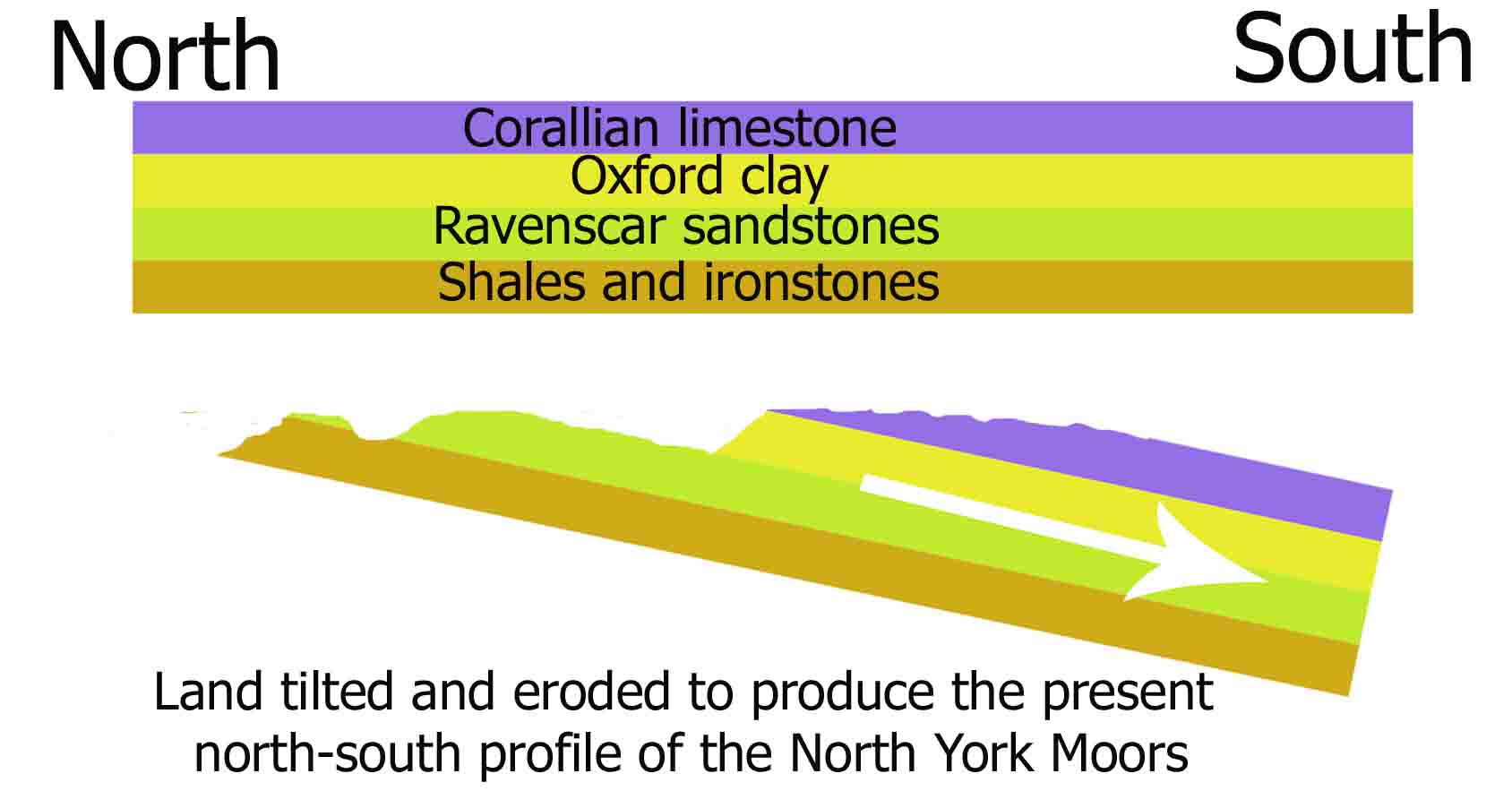
A cross section of the geology of the North York Moors

Subsequently, about 30 million years ago, the land was uplifted and tilted towards the south by earth movements. The upper layers of rock were eroded away and the older rocks were exposed in places. Because of the tilt the oldest rocks became exposed in the north. These are the bands of shales and ironstones on the northern scarp of the moors and Cleveland Hills. The middle layers form the sandstones of the high moors and the youngest layers of limestone form the tabular hills. In the dales where the rivers have cut through the younger rocks there are also exposures of older shales, ironstone and sandstone. Rosedale is an example of this.

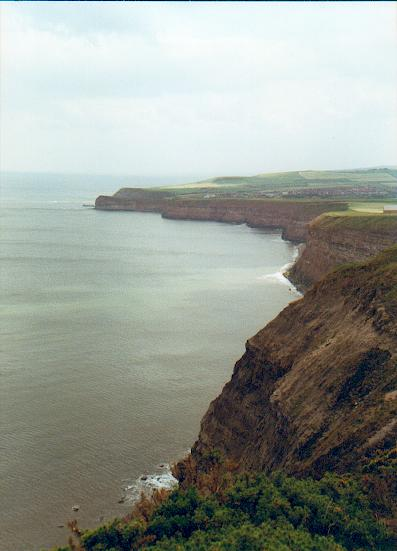
The Jurassic strata of Boulby Cliff

During the Quaternary period, the last 2 million years, the area has experienced a sequence of glaciations. The most recent glaciation, the Devensian, ended about 10,000 years ago. The higher parts of the North York Moors were not covered by the ice sheets but glaciers flowed southwards on either side of the higher land mass.

As the climate became warmer at the end of the ice age the snowfields on the moors began to melt. The meltwater was unable to escape northwards, westwards or eastwards because it was blocked by ice. Huge torrents of water were forced southwards. Water from the Esk valley area flowed southwards gouging out the deep Newtondale valley as it went. Water from the moors formed a vast lake in the area of the Vale of Pickering. Eventually this lake filled its basin and then overflowed at the lowest point which was at Kirkham. Here it cut the steep sided Kirkham gorge. When the glacier finally retreated they left deep deposits of boulder clay and glacial alluvium behind. The boulder clay blocked the eastern end of the Vale of Pickering causing a permanent deviation in the course of the River Derwent. Alluvium from the glaciers covers many areas to the north of the moors and in the Esk valley

=== The Vale of Pickering ===
The site of the post glacial Lake Pickering, the vale has a predominantly level topography covered by glacial drift deposits, with some rolling low ground on boulder clay and moraines in the far east. The underlying Jurassic sandstones and mudstones have little direct influence upon the landscape. There are minor outliers of Jurassic limestone in places at the foot of the Howardian Hills and the North York Moors, and there is some eroded chalk from the Wolds mixed with sands at the base of the Wolds in the south-east. There are springs associated with calcareous aquifers in places on the periphery of the vale.

=== The Yorkshire Wolds ===
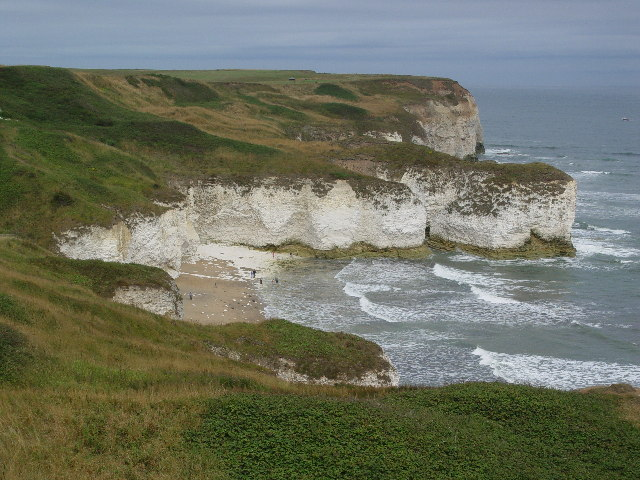
The Cretaceous chalk cliffs at Flamborough Head

The hills are formed from Cretaceous chalk, and make an arc from the Humber estuary west of Kingston upon Hull up to the North Sea coast between Bridlington and Scarborough. Here they rise up to form cliffs, most notably at Flamborough, Bempton Cliffs and Filey; Flamborough Headland is designated a Heritage Coast. On the other side of the Humber, the chalk formations continue as the Lincolnshire Wolds.

Most of the area takes the form of an elevated, gently rolling plateau, cut by numerous deep, steep-sided, flat-bottomed valleys of glacial origin. The chalk formation of the hills provides exceptionally good drainage, with the result that most of these valleys are dry; indeed, surface water is quite scarce throughout the Wolds. Typically the valleys are hard to see from above, creating the visual impression that the landscape is much flatter than is actually the case.

=== Holderness ===
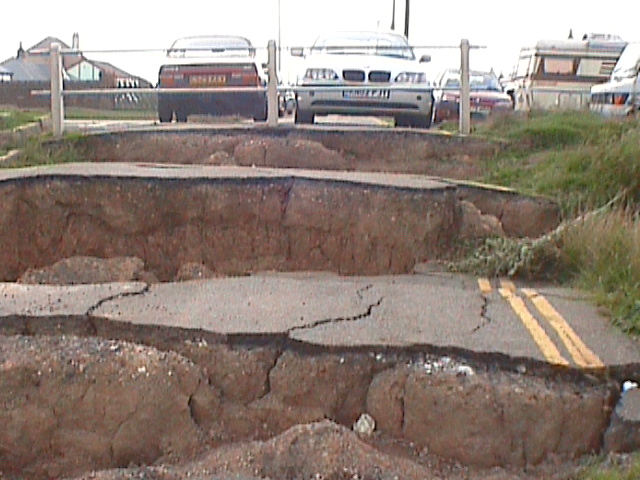
Aldbrough, Holderness. Coastal erosion.

Geologically, Holderness is underlain by Cretaceous Chalk but in most places it is so deeply buried beneath glacial deposits that it has no influence on the landscape. The landscape is dominated by deposits of till, boulder clays and glacial lake clays. These were deposited during the Devensian glaciation. The glacial deposits form a more or less continuous lowland plain which has some peat filled depressions (known locally as meres) which mark the presence of former lake beds. There are other glacial landscape features such as drumlin mounds, ridges and kettle holes scattered throughout the area.

The well-drained glacial deposits provide fertile soils that can support intensive arable cultivation. Fields are generally large and bounded by drainage ditches. There is very little woodland in the area and this leads to a landscape that is essentially rural but very flat and exposed. The coast is subject to rapid marine erosion.

=== The Humberhead Levels ===
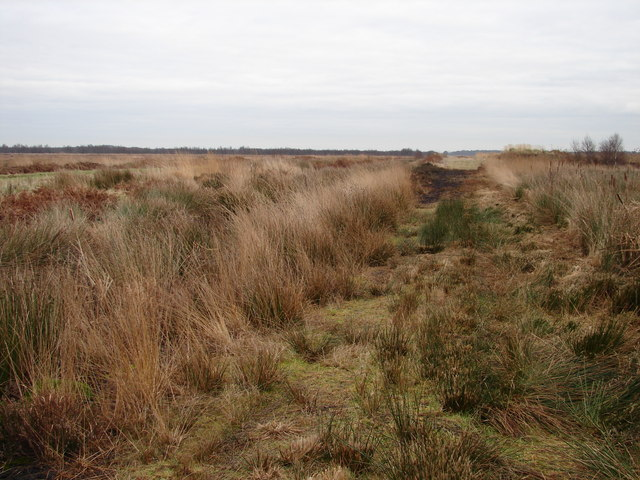
A footpath through the Humberhead nature reserve

During the last ice age, a glacier extended across this area almost to where Doncaster now is. The main glacial front was at Escrick where the Escrick moraine marks its position. This formed the northern limit of an extensive lake, Glacial Lake Humber, which was impounded by the blocking of the Humber Gap by another ice front. Later the lake was filled with clay sediments which are up to 20 metres thick in some places. These clay sediments are locally overlain by peat deposits forming raised mires. At the base of the peat layers can be found the remains of a buried forest.

== Geological Sites of Special Scientific Interest in Yorkshire ==
| Site name | Grid ref | Geological feature |
|---|---|---|
| Millington Wood and Pastures | SE850545 | Dry chalk valleys |
| Rifle Butts Quarry | SE898426 | Cretaceous red chalk |
| Withow Gap, Skipsea | TA183546 | Glacial lake deposits |
| Flamborough Head | TA170570 | Upper Cretaceous chalk cliffs |
| Malham – Arncliffe | SD920672 | Carboniferous limestone weathering |
| Robin Hood's Bay | NZ941082 | Jurassic strata |
| Newtondale | SE820915 | Glacial overflow channel |
| Micklefield Quarry | SE446325 | Magnesian limestone |
| South Elmsall Quarry | SE484116 | Magnesian limestone |
