= Bowland High Group =

Succession of limestone rock strata in England

- Stratigraphic range: Courceyan-Chadian
- Type: Group
- Unit of: Carboniferous Limestone Supergroup
- Underlies: Hodder Mudstone Formation
- Thickness: up to 2340m

Lithology
- Primary: limestone
- Other: mudstone, siltstone

Location
- Region: northern England
- Extent: Craven Basin

Type section
- Named for: Forest of Bowland

The Bowland High Group is a lithostratigraphical term referring to the thick succession of limestone rock strata which occur in the Craven Basin of Lancashire and Yorkshire in northern England, United Kingdom from the Courceyan to the Chadian sub-Stage of the Carboniferous Period.

The Bowland High Group is unconformably overlain by the Hodder Mudstone Formation of the Craven Group.

== See also ==
Geology of Lancashire
