= Aire Gap =

Geological feature in England

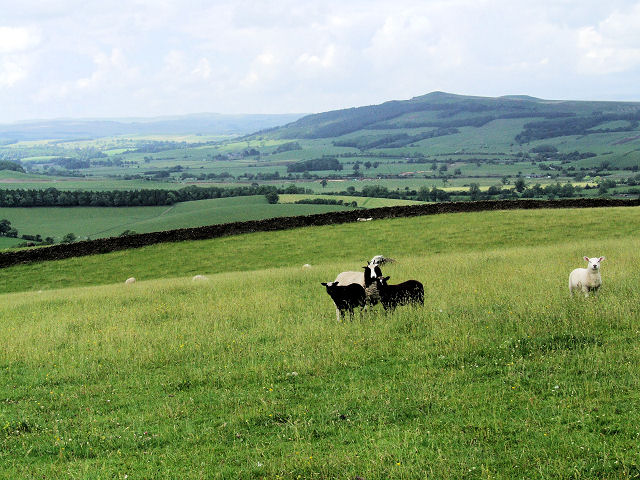
- Floor elevation: 179 metres (587 ft)
- Length: approx 40 kilometres (25 mi) 128 degrees
- Width: approx 20 kilometres (12 mi)
- Depth: average 300 metres (980 ft)

Geology
- Type: Glacial U-shaped
- Age: Carboniferous through Pleistocene

Geography
- Location: Craven District, North Yorkshire, England
- Population centers: (Settle), Hellifield, Gargrave, (Colne), Skipton, Sutton-in-Craven, Keighley
- Borders on: Craven Fault and north edge of South Pennines
- Coordinates: 54°0′0″N 2°10′0″W
- Traversed by: A65 road, "Little" North Western Railway, Leeds and Liverpool Canal
- Interactive map of Aire Gap

Aire Gap is a pass through the Pennines in England formed by geologic faults and carved out by glaciers. The term is used to describe a geological division, a travel route, or a location that is an entry into the Aire river valley.

== Geology ==
Geologically the Aire Gap lies between the Craven Fault and the limestone uplands of the Yorkshire Dales to the north and the Forest of Bowland and the millstone grit moors of the South Pennines. The South Pennines is the system between the Aire Gap and the Peak District. The gap was formed by the dropping of the Craven Faults in the Carboniferous through Jurassic periods combined with glacial scouring by ice sheets in the Pleistocene Ice Age. The Aire Gap splits the Pennines into north and south by allying with the River Ribble. The Pennine chain is divided into two sections by the Aire Gap formed by the River Aire flowing south, a member of the Humber basin, and the Ribble flowing west and entering the Irish sea.

== Geography ==
The term Aire Gap is used in both Ribblesdale and Pendle to denote a hypsograph (watershed) between those rivers and Airedale. Two locations are so described:

- Ribblesdale's Aire Gap designates a precise point at 160 m (525 ft) just east of Hellifield near Settle at 54.00000°N 2.16667°W, and is labelled Aire Gap on some maps. It is the watershed of that pass and lies between the "Little" North Western Railway and the A65 road.
- The head of Pendle Water valley culminates in Foulridge 53.8768°N 2.176420°W near Colne. In literature Colne commonly describes itself as being in the Aire Gap. When the Leeds and Liverpool Canal was being constructed they dug a tunnel at altitude 140 m (459 ft) beneath Foulridge's 165 m (541 ft) to make a route even lower than the 160m pass near Hellifield.

== Transport route ==
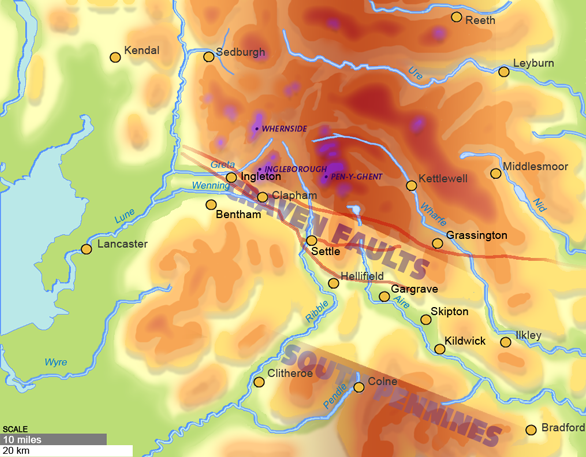
The Aire Gap's boundaries are only vaguely definable

The Pennines form a natural barrier to east–west communications, but the Tyne Gap links Carlisle and Newcastle and the Aire Gap links Lancashire and Yorkshire.

To walk the Pennine moors is "potentially dangerous if the weather is bad and you are ill equipped. If the cloud comes down you will need both a compass and a knowledge of how to use it."

— Jim Jarratt, 2006

Its extent is vague, a 19th-century author wrote:

"This depression is known as the Aire Gap, occasionally as the Skipton Gap, Skipton being at its eastern end and Hellifield at its western end",

— Thomas Dunham Whitaker, Vicar of Whalley, 1878

The Aire Gap is of considerable strategic importance and historically Skipton Castle controlled the area. Skipton is now considered more central to the Aire Gap than terminal.

== Topography ==
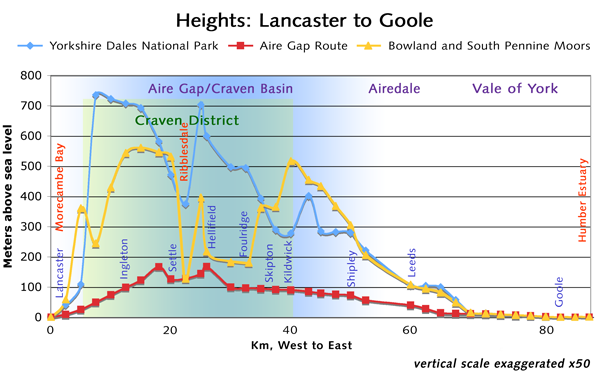
Cross-section of the topography of England, coast to coast. The red line shows the altitudes at the bottom of the valley called the Craven Basin or the Aire Gap. These contrast with the heights of the mountains of the Yorkshire Dales National Park to the north shows as a blue line, and also with the heights of the Forest of Bowland and the South Pennine Moors to the south marked as a yellow line.

The treeless moorland gives no shelter and modern Pennine transport can find it a formidable barrier when roads are blocked by snow for several days. The Aire Gap route is a sheltered passageway, and inhabited along its length. The Aire Gap was of topographic significance for the historic North of England providing a low-altitude pass through "the backbone of England". It was the Pennine transport corridor from Cumbria and Strathclyde to the Vale of York. Neolithic long-distance trade is proved by many finds of stone axes from central Cumbria.

To the north stand limestone hills of up to 736 m (2,415 ft) above mean sea level and to its south lie bleak sandstone moors, that above 275 m (902 ft) grow little but bracken.

The builders of the "Little" North Western Railway sought the lowest course through the Aire Gap and found that to be 166 m (545 ft) near Giggleswick scar at 54.074167°N 2.318056°W, and 160 m (525 ft) just east of Hellifield at 54.00000°N 2.16667°W a point labelled Aire Gap on maps.

There is a lower pass from Airedale to Ribblesdale near Thornton-in-Craven of 144 m (472 ft) at 53.93413°N 2.16276°W that was used by the Romans who built a road.

The nearest alternative pass is Stainmore Gap (Eden-Tees) to the north that climbs to 409 m (1,342 ft) and its climate is classed as sub-arctic in places.
