= Craven Group =

- Stratigraphic range: Chadian-Yeadonian sub-stages of Carboniferous period
- Type: Group
- Sub-units: Hodder Mudstone, Hodderense Limestone, Pendleside Limestone, Bowland Shale formations
- Underlies: Millstone Grit Group
- Overlies: Bowland High Group, Clwyd Limestone Group
- Thickness: up to 5000m

Lithology
- Primary: mudstone, limestone
- Other: sandstone, siltstone, chert

Location
- Region: northern England, English Midlands and northeast Wales

Type section
- Named for: Craven district

The Craven Group is a lithostratigraphical term referring to the succession of mudstone and limestone rock strata which occur in certain parts of northern and central England and northeast Wales in the United Kingdom within the Chadian to Yeadonian sub-Stages of the Carboniferous Period. Other lithologies including sandstones, siltstones and chert occur within the group. The Group is subdivided into numerous formations, some of which previously enjoyed group status. In stratigraphic order (uppermost/youngest at top), these are:

- Bowland Shale Formation (mudstone and siltstone)
- Pendleside Limestone Formation (interbedded limestone and mudstone, conglomerate)
- Hodderense Limestone Formation
- Hodder Mudstone Formation (limestone and mudstone)

The Craven Group unconformably overlies the Bowland High Group and elsewhere the Clwyd Limestone Group. It is succeeded (overlain) by the Millstone Grit Group

== See also ==
Geology of Lancashire
