= Craven Basin =

Sedimentary basin in northern England

The Craven Basin is a sedimentary basin in northern England, having the shape of a southerly-tilted graben which was active during the Carboniferous period. It is one of a series of such basins which developed across northern England in this period separating upstanding blocks which were typically underlain by buoyant granites. The basin trends roughly east–west and is bounded by the Lake District block to the northwest, the Askrigg Block to the northeast and the Central Lancashire High to the south. One distinct section of the basin is a half graben which contains over 3km thickness of late Devonian to Courceyan strata and is referred to as the Bowland Sub-basin. These basins resulted from the crust of the region being subjected to a north–south lateral tension regime which began in the late Devonian and lasted through until the Visean.

== Fill ==
The proven sedimentary fill in the Craven Basin starts with Courceyan age mudstones and limestones of the Chatburn Limestone Group, followed by the similar sediments deposited from Chadian to Asbian times and assigned to the Worston Shale Group. The basal part of this group is the Clitheroe Limestone which is unconformably overlain by the Hodder Mudstone. Completing the group are the Hodderense Limestone and Pendleside Limestone. The basin fill is completed by the Brigantian age Bowland Shale Group which comprises the Pendleside Sandstones within what is otherwise a mudstone succession.

== Craven Fault System ==
The boundary between the Craven Basin and the Askrigg Block is defined by the Craven Fault System which comprises the North, Middle and South Craven faults. The last-named actually extends into the basin. There is a reef belt which runs along the line of the Middle Craven Fault between Settle and Cracoe.
