= Pennines =

Range of uplands in Northern England

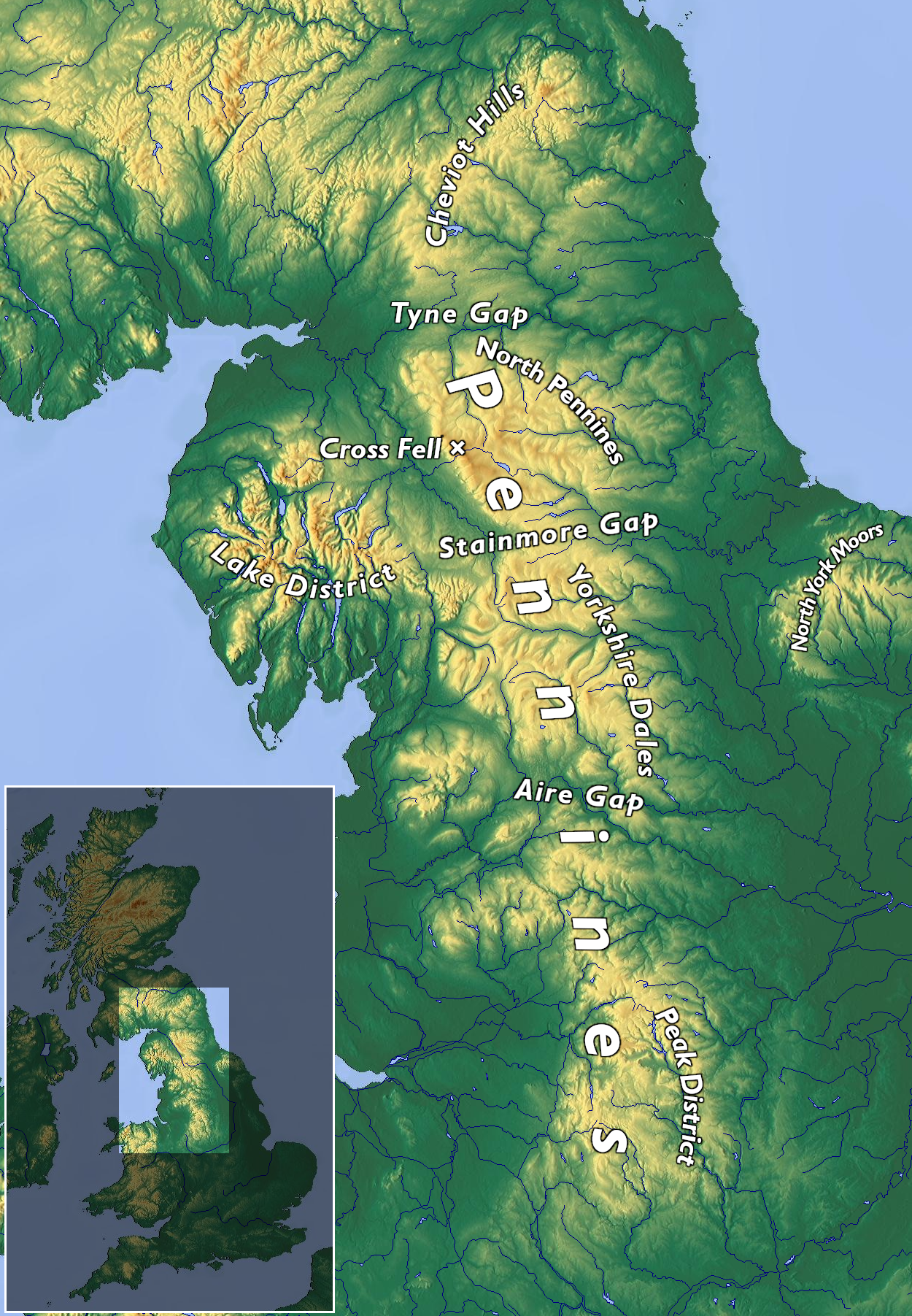
- Northern England and adjoining areas, showing the general extent of the Pennines

Highest point
- Peak: Cross Fell
- Elevation: 893 m (2,930 ft)
- Coordinates: 54°42′10″N 2°29′14″W

Geography
- Location: Northumberland, Cumbria, County Durham, North Yorkshire, West Yorkshire, South Yorkshire, Lancashire, Greater Manchester, Cheshire, Derbyshire, Staffordshire
- Countries: England, United Kingdom

The Pennines (/ˈpɛnaɪnz/), also known as the Pennine Chain or Pennine Hills, are an upland range mainly located in Northern England. Sometimes described as the "backbone of England" because of its length and position, the range runs from Derbyshire and Staffordshire in the north of the Midlands to Northumberland in North East England. From the Tyne Gap in the north, the range extends south through the North Pennines, Yorkshire Dales, South Pennines, and Peak District to end near the valley of the River Trent. The Border Moors and Cheviot Hills, which lie beyond the Tyne Gap, are included in some definitions of the range.

The range is divided into two by the Aire Gap, a wide pass formed by the valleys of the rivers Aire and Ribble. There are several spurs off the main Pennine range west into Greater Manchester and Lancashire, comprising the Rossendale Fells, West Pennine Moors, and Bowland Fells. The Howgill Fells and Orton Fells in Cumbria are also sometimes considered to be Pennine spurs. The Pennines are an important water catchment area, with numerous reservoirs in the head streams of the river valleys.

Most of the range is protected by national parks and national landscapes (formerly Areas of Outstanding Natural Beauty). Running north to south, and including the Cheviots, the range is within Northumberland National Park, the North Pennines National Landscape, the Yorkshire Dales National Park, Nidderdale National Landscape, the Forest of Bowland National Landscape, and the Peak District National Park. The only significant unprotected area is that between Skipton and Marsden.

Britain's oldest long-distance footpath, the 268-mile (429 km) Pennine Way, runs along most of the Pennines.

== Name ==
Various etymologies have proposed treating "Pennine" as a native Brittonic/Welsh name related to pen- ("head", "top", "chief", etc.). It did not become a common name until the 18th century, and may instead derive from modern comparisons with the Apennine Mountains, which run down the middle of Italy in a similar fashion.

Following an 1853 article by Arthur Hussey, it has become a common belief that the name derives from a passage in The Description of Britain (Latin: De Situ Britanniæ), (Note: Route VII: "... This province is divided into two equal parts by a chain of mountains called the Pennine Alps, which rising on the confines of the Iceni and Carnabii, near the River Trivona [Trent], extend towards the north in a continued series of fifty miles ...") an infamous historical forgery concocted by Charles Bertram in the 1740s and accepted as genuine until the 1840s. In 2004, George Redmonds reassessed this, finding that numerous respected writers passed over the origin of the mountains' name in silence even in works dedicated to the topological etymology of Derbyshire and Lancashire. He found that the derivation from Bertram was widely believed and considered uncomfortable. In fact, Redmonds found repeated comparisons with the Italian Apennines going back at least as early as William Camden (1551–1623), (Note: Skipton, Camden said, was "hidden and enclosed among steep Hilles to Latium in Italie, which Varro supposeth to have been called because it lyeth close under the Apennine and the Alps". He went on to describe how "the North part ... riseth up and swelleth somewhat mountainous, with moores and hilles, but of no bignesse, which beginning here runs like as Apennine doth in Italie, through the middest of England ... even as far as Scotland, although oftentimes they change their name.") many of whose placenames and ideas Bertram incorporated into his work. Bertram was responsible (at most) with popularizing the name against other contenders such as Daniel Defoe's "English Andes". His own form of the name was the "Pennine Alps" (Alpes Peninae), which today is used for a western section of the continental Alps. Those mountains (the area around the St. Bernard Pass) derive their name from the Latin Alpes Pœninæ whose name has been variously derived from the Carthaginians, a local god, and Celtic peninus. The St. Bernard Pass was the pass used in the invasions of Italy by the Gallic Boii and Lingones in 390 BC. The etymology of the Apennines themselves—whose name first referred to their northern extremity and then later spread southward—is also disputed but is usually taken to derive from some form of Celtic pen or ben ("mountain, head").

Various towns and geographical features within the Pennines have names of at least partly Celtic origin, including Pennington, Penrith, Pen-y-ghent, Pendle Hill, the River Eden, and Cumbria. More commonly, local names result from Anglo-Saxon and Norse settlements. In Yorkshire, Teesdale, and Cumbria, many words of Norse origin, not commonly used in standard English, are part of everyday speech: for example, gill/ghyll (narrow steep valley), beck (brook or stream), fell (hill), and dale (valley). Northumbrian/borders terms are used in South Tynedale, Weardale, and Allendale, such as burn (stream), cleugh (ravine), hope (valley), law (hill) and linn (waterfall).

== Geography ==
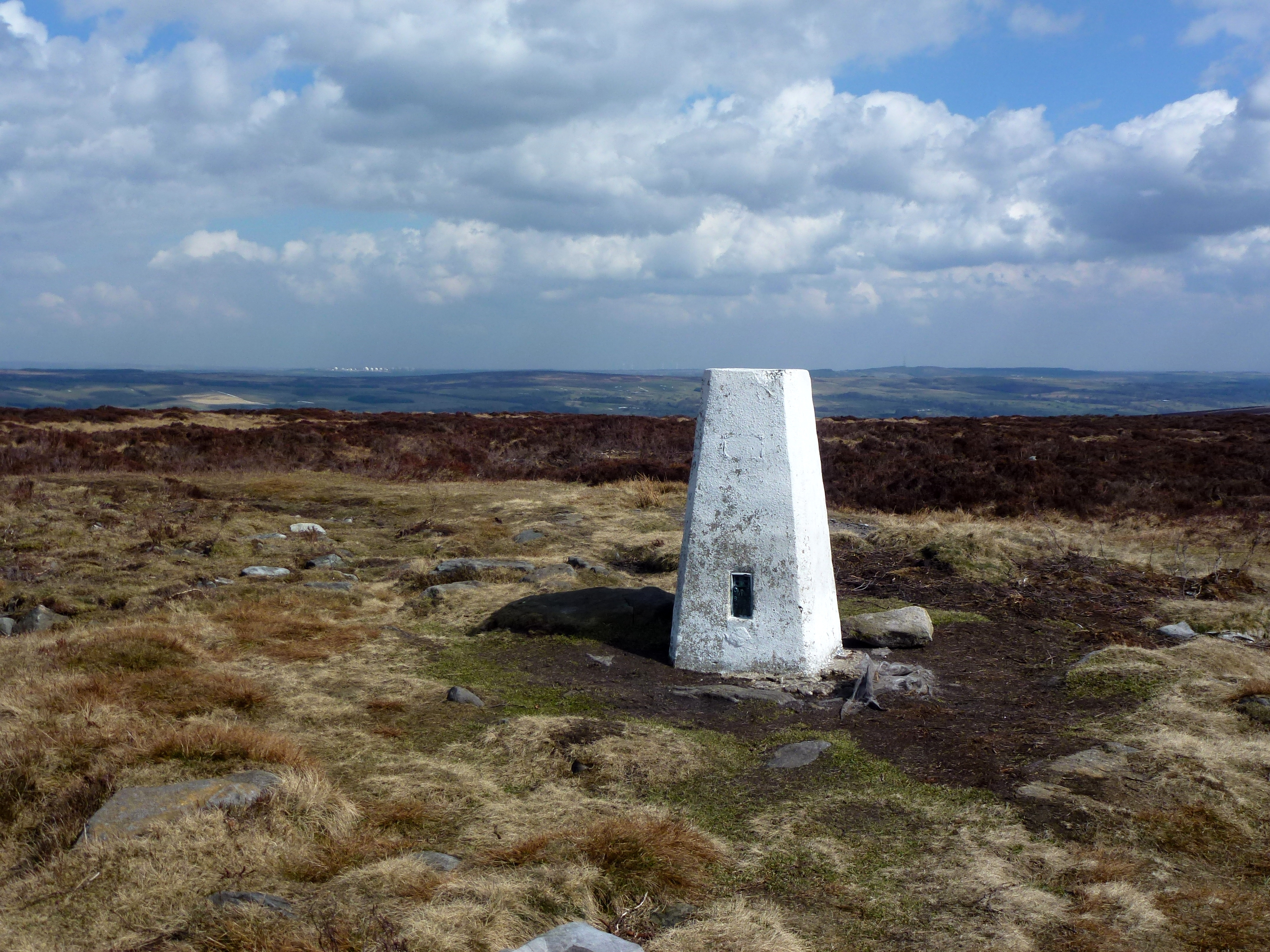
Rombalds Moor, South Pennines

The northern Pennine range is bordered by the foothills of the Lake District, and uplands of the Howgill Fells, Orton Fells, Border Moors and Cheviot Hills. The West Pennine Moors, Rossendale Valley and Forest of Bowland are western spurs, the former two are in the South Pennines. The Howgill Fells and Orton Fells are sometimes considered to be part of the Pennines, both inside the Yorkshire Dales National Park. The Pennines are fringed by extensive lowlands including the Eden Valley, West Lancashire Coastal Plain, Cheshire Plain, Vale of York, Humberhead Levels and the Midland Plains.

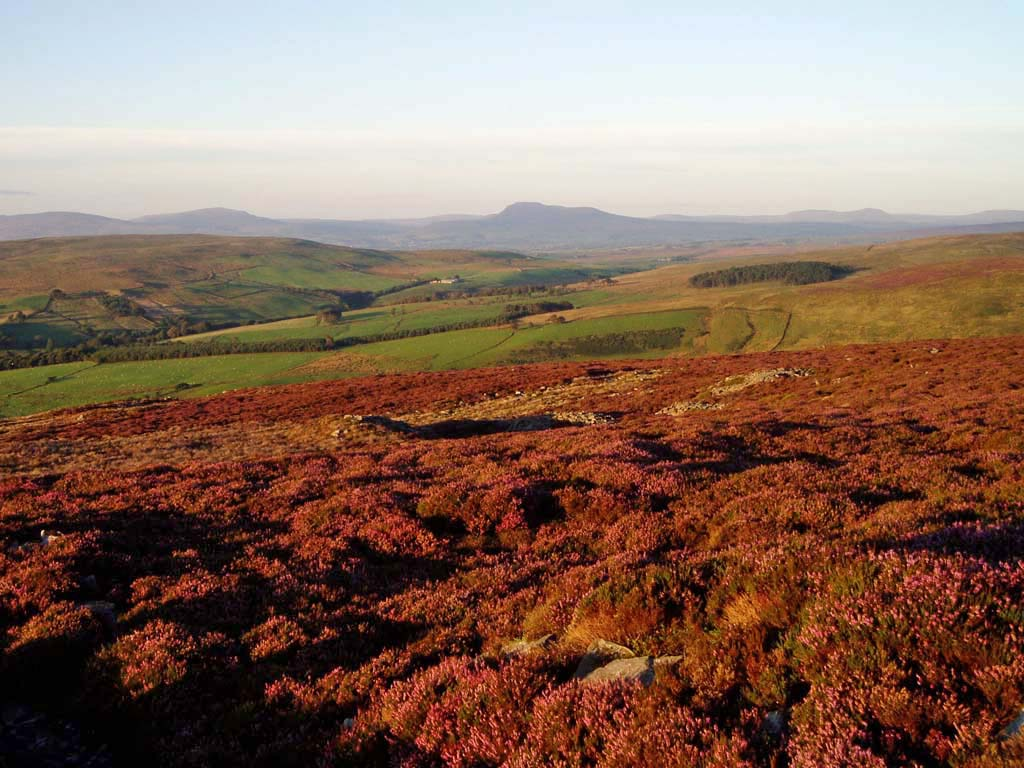
Scenery in the Forest of Bowland

The main range of the Pennines start from its southern end at the Weaver Hills in the Peak District. The southern foothills of the range merge into the valley and basin of the River Trent, separating the range from the Midland Plains to the south. The Pennines continue northwards across the Peak District and adjoin the South Pennines approximately around the Tame Valley, Standedge and Holme Valley. The South Pennines are separated from the Forest of Bowland by the Ribble Valley, and include the Rossendale Valley and West Pennine Moors in the west. The range continues further north into the Aire Gap which separates the Yorkshire Dales from the South Pennines to the south and the Forest of Bowland to the southwest. The main range then continues northwards across the Yorkshire Dales to the Stainmore Gap where it adjoins the North Pennines. The range continues into its northern end at the Tyne Gap, separating it from the Border Moors and Cheviot Hills across the Anglo-Scottish border.

Although the Pennines cover the area between the Peak District and the Tyne Gap, the Pennine Way affects perceptions of the southern and northern extents of the defined area. The southern end of the Pennines is said to be in the High Peak of Derbyshire at Edale, the start of the Pennine Way, but the main range continues south across the Peak District to the Weaver Hills, with its foothills merging into the Trent Valley. This encompasses eastern Cheshire, northern and eastern Staffordshire, and southern Derbyshire. Conversely, the Border Moors and Cheviot Hills, separated by the Tyne Gap and Whin Sill to the south, along which run the A69 and Hadrian's Wall, and River Tweed to the north, are not part of the Pennines but, perhaps because the Pennine Way crosses them, they are treated as such.

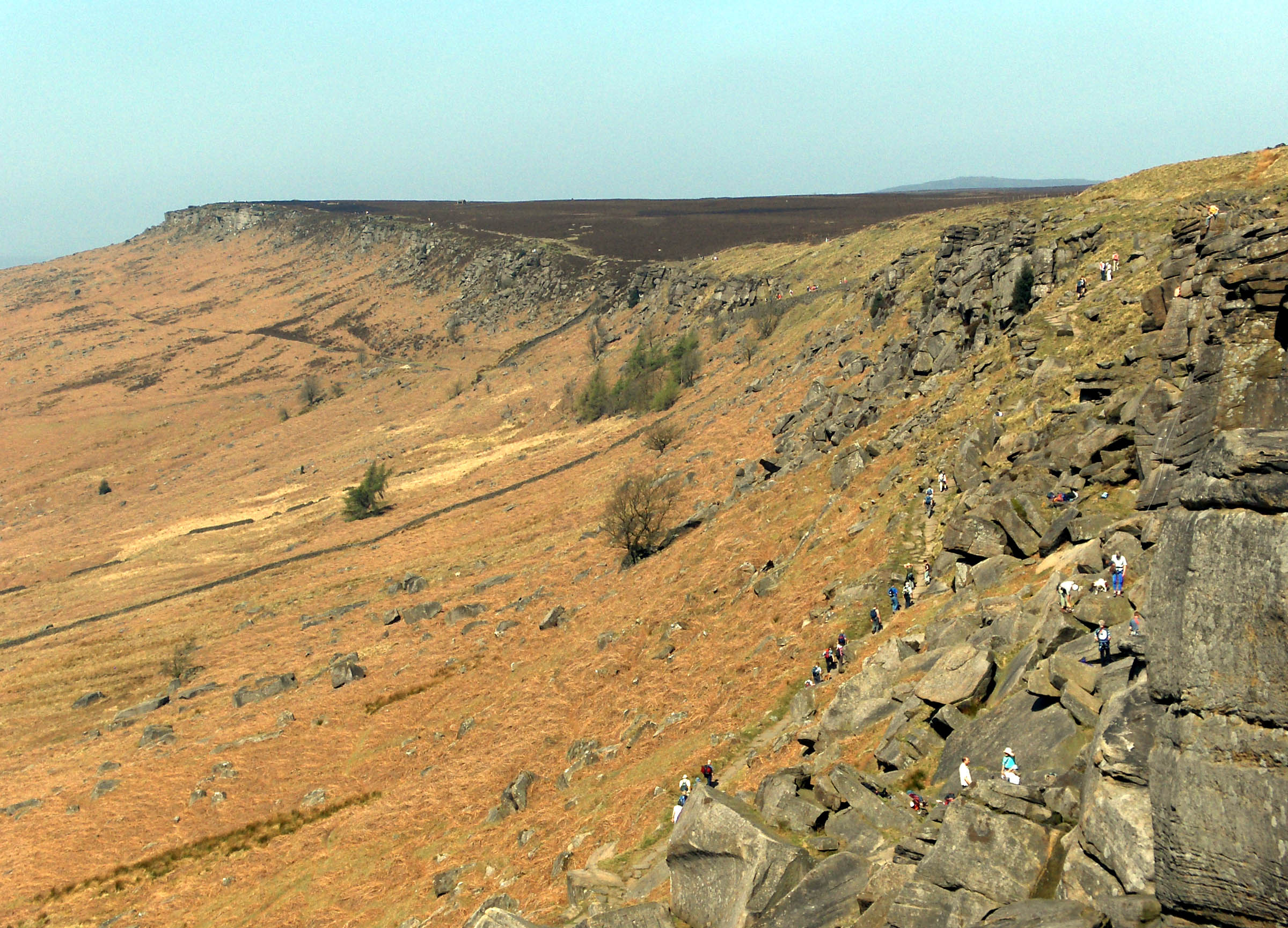
Stanage Edge in the Peak District

Most of the Pennine landscape is characterised by upland areas of high moorland indented by more fertile river valleys, although the landscape varies in different areas. The Peak District consists of hills, plateaus and valleys, divided into the Dark Peak with moorlands and gritstone edges, and the White Peak with limestone gorges. The South Pennines is an area of hills and moorlands with narrow valleys between the Peak District and Yorkshire Dales. Bowland is dominated by a central upland landform of deeply incised gritstone fells covered with tracts of heather-covered peat moorland, blanket bog and steep-sided wooded valleys linking the upland and lowland landscapes. The landscape is higher and more mountainous in the Yorkshire Dales and North Pennines. The Yorkshire Dales are characterised by valleys, moorlands and fells while the North Pennines consist of plateaus, moorlands, fells, edges and valleys, with most of the higher peaks in the west.

=== Elevation ===
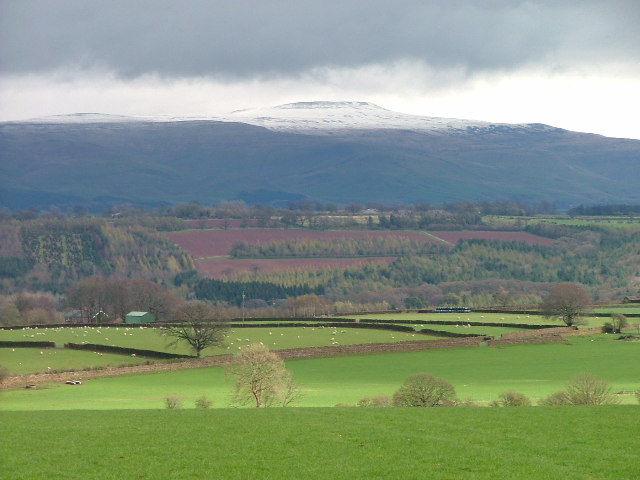
Cross Fell, the highest point of the Pennines

Rising less than 3,000 feet (900 m), the Pennines are fells, with most of the mountainous terrain in the north. The highest point is Cross Fell in eastern Cumbria, at 2,930 feet (893 m) and other principal peaks in the North Pennines are Great Dun Fell 2,782 ft (848 m), Mickle Fell 2,585 ft (788 m), and Burnhope Seat 2,451 ft (747 m). Principal peaks in the Yorkshire Dales include Whernside 2,415 ft (736 m), Ingleborough 2,372 ft (723 m), High Seat 2,328 ft (710 m), Wild Boar Fell 2,324 ft (708 m) and Pen-y-ghent 2,274 ft (693 m). Principal peaks in the Forest of Bowland include Ward's Stone 1,841 ft (561 m), Fair Snape Fell 1,710 ft (521 m), and Hawthornthwaite Fell 1,572 ft (479 m). Terrain is lower towards the south and the only peaks which exceed 2,000 ft (610 m) are Kinder Scout 2,087 ft (636 m) and Bleaklow 2,077 ft (633 m) in the Peak District. Other principal peaks in the South Pennines and Peak District include Black Hill 1,909 ft (582 m), Shining Tor 1,834 ft (559 m), Pendle Hill 1,827 ft (557 m), Black Chew Head 1,778 ft (542 m), Rombalds Moor 1,319 ft (402 m) and Winter Hill 1,496 ft (456 m).

=== Drainage ===
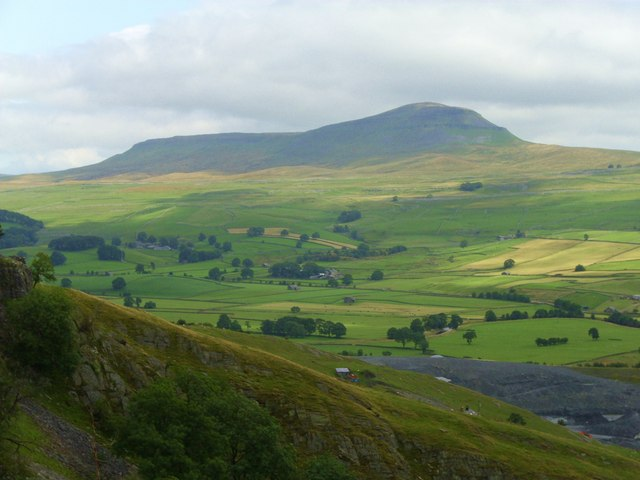
Ribblesdale, Yorkshire Dales

For much of their length the Pennines are the main watershed in northern England, dividing east and west. The rivers Eden, Ribble, Dane and tributaries of the Mersey (including the Irwell, Tame and Goyt) flow westwards towards the Irish Sea.

On the eastern side of the Pennines, the rivers Tyne, Wear, and Tees all drain directly to the North Sea. The Swale, Ure, Nidd, Wharfe, Aire, Calder and Don all flow into the Yorkshire Ouse, and reach the sea through the Humber Estuary.

The River Trent flows around the southern end of the Pennines and northwards on the eastern side taking water from tributaries, principally the Dove and Derwent. The Trent drains the east and west sides of the southern Pennines, also reaching the North Sea through the Humber Estuary. The Trent and Ouse meet and enter the Humber at Trent Falls. Maximum discharge through the Humber can reach 1,500 m^{3}/s (53,000 cu ft/s).

=== Climate ===
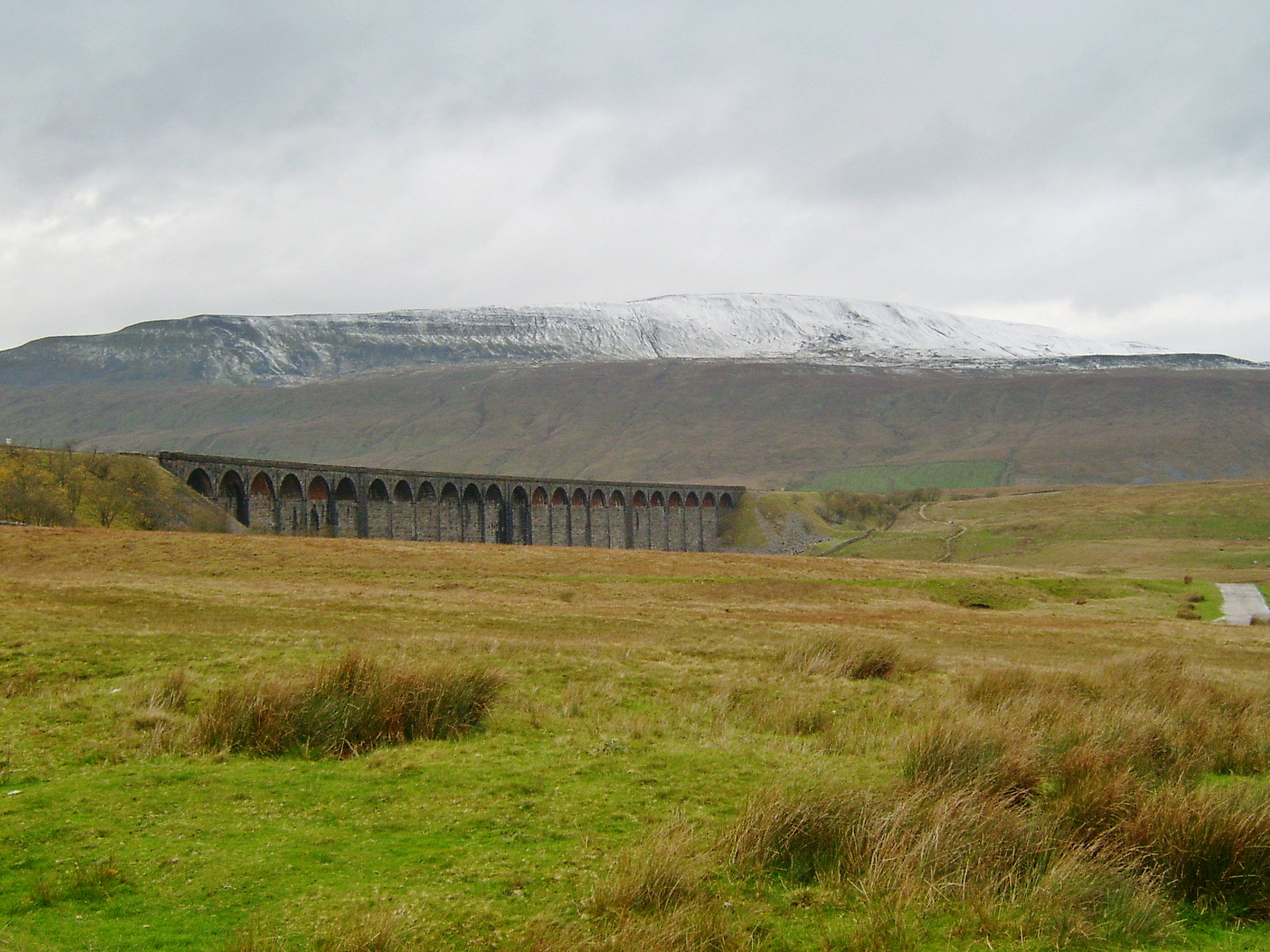
A snow-covered Whernside, Yorkshire Dales

According to the Köppen classification, the Pennines generally have a temperate oceanic climate (Cfb) like the rest of England, but the uplands have more precipitation, stronger winds and colder weather than the surrounding areas. Some of the higher elevations have a subpolar oceanic climate (Cfc), which may border a tundra (ET) and subarctic climate (Dfc) in areas like Great Dun Fell.

More snow falls on the Pennines than on surrounding lowland areas due to the elevation and distance from the coast; unlike lowland areas of England, the Pennines can have quite severe winters.

The northwest is amongst the wettest regions of England and much of the rain falls on the Pennines. The eastern side is drier than the west—the rain shadow shields northeast England from rainfall that would otherwise fall there.

Precipitation is important for the area's biodiversity and human population. Many towns and cities are located along rivers flowing from the range and in northwest England the lack of natural aquifers is compensated for by reservoirs.

Water has carved out limestone landscapes in the North Pennines, Yorkshire Dales and Peak District, with gorges and caves present in the Yorkshire Dales and Peak District. In some areas, precipitation has contributed to poor soils, resulting in part in moorland landscapes that characterize much of the range. In other areas where the soil has not been degraded, it has resulted in lush vegetation.

For the purpose of growing plants, the Pennines are in hardiness zones 7 and 8, as defined by the USDA. Zone 8 is common throughout most of the UK, and zone 7 is the UK's coldest hardiness zone. The Pennines, Scottish Highlands, Southern Uplands and Snowdonia are the only areas of the UK in zone 7.

Climate data for Great Dun Fell, North Pennines WMO ID: 03227; coordinates 54°41′02″N 2°27′05″W; elevation: 847 m (2,779 ft); 1991–2020 normals
Month	Jan	Feb	Mar	Apr	May	Jun	Jul	Aug	Sep	Oct	Nov	Dec	Year
Mean daily maximum °C (°F)	1.6 (34.9)	1.6 (34.9)	2.8 (37.0)	5.4 (41.7)	8.6 (47.5)	11.0 (51.8)	12.5 (54.5)	12.3 (54.1)	10.1 (50.2)	6.8 (44.2)	4.0 (39.2)	2.1 (35.8)	6.6 (43.9)
Daily mean °C (°F)	−0.4 (31.3)	−0.5 (31.1)	0.6 (33.1)	2.7 (36.9)	5.6 (42.1)	8.2 (46.8)	10.0 (50.0)	9.8 (49.6)	7.8 (46.0)	4.8 (40.6)	2.1 (35.8)	0.0 (32.0)	4.2 (39.6)
Mean daily minimum °C (°F)	−2.4 (27.7)	−2.6 (27.3)	−1.6 (29.1)	0.0 (32.0)	2.7 (36.9)	5.5 (41.9)	7.5 (45.5)	7.4 (45.3)	5.6 (42.1)	2.8 (37.0)	0.2 (32.4)	−2.1 (28.2)	1.9 (35.4)
Source: Met Office

== Geology ==
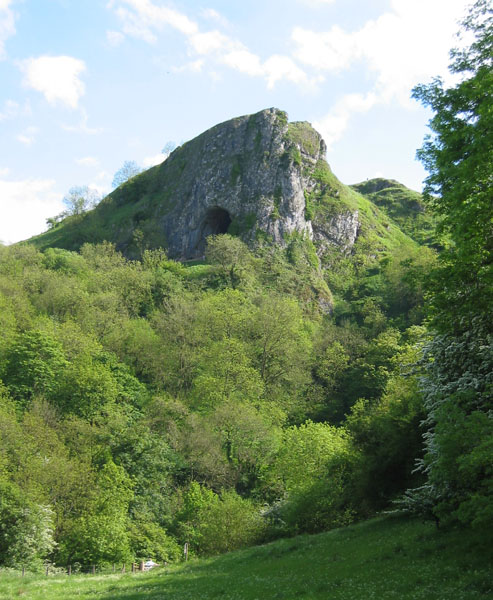
Limestone scenery at Thor's Cave, Peak District

The Pennines have been carved from a series of geological structures whose overall form is a broad anticline whose axis extends in a north–south direction. The North Pennines are coincident with the Alston Block and the Yorkshire Dales are coincident with the Askrigg Block. In the south the Peak District is essentially a flat-topped dome.

Each of the structures consists of Carboniferous limestone overlain with Millstone Grit. The limestone is exposed at the surface in the North Pennines, Yorkshire Dales and the Peak District. In the Dales and the White Peak, limestone exposure has caused the formation of large cave systems and watercourses. In the Dales the caves or potholes are known as "pots" in the Yorkshire dialect. They include some of the largest caves in England at Gaping Gill, more than 350 ft (107 m) deep and Rowten Pot, 365 ft (111 m) deep. Titan in the Peak District, the deepest shaft known in Britain, is connected to Peak Cavern in Castleton, Derbyshire, the largest cave entrance in the country. Erosion of the limestone has led to geological formations, such as the limestone pavements at Malham Cove.

Between the northern and southern areas of exposed limestone between Skipton and the Dark Peak is a belt of exposed gritstone. Here the shales and sandstones of the Millstone Grit form high hills occupied by moorland covered with bracken, peat, heather and coarse grasses; the higher ground is uncultivable and barely fit for pasture.

== History ==
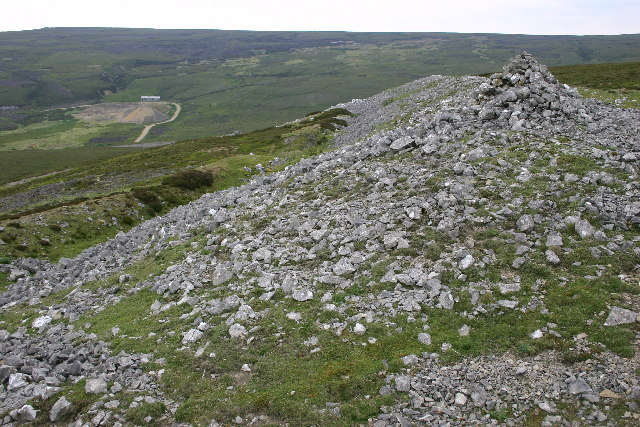
A prehistoric settlement on Harkerside Moor in Swaledale

The Pennines contained Bronze Age settlements, and evidence remains of Neolithic settlement including many stone circles and henges, such as Long Meg and Her Daughters.

The uplands were controlled by the tribal federation of the Brigantes, made up of small tribes who inhabited the area and cooperated on defence and external affairs. They evolved an early form of kingdom. During Roman times, the Brigantes were dominated by the Romans who exploited the Pennines for their natural resources including the wild animals found there.

The Pennines were an obstacle for Anglo-Saxon expansion westwards, although it appears the Anglo-Saxons travelled through the valleys. During the Dark Ages the Pennines were controlled by Celtic and Anglo-Saxon kingdoms. It is believed that the north Pennines were under the control of the kingdom of Rheged.

During Norse times the Pennines were settled by Viking Danes in the east and Norwegian Vikings in the west. The Vikings influenced place names, culture and genetics. When England was unified the Pennines were incorporated. The mix of Celtic, Anglo-Saxon and Viking heritage resembled much of the rest of northern England and its culture developed alongside its lowland neighbours in northwest and northeast England. The Pennines were not a distinct political polity, but were divided between neighbouring counties in northeast and northwest England; a major part was in the West Riding of Yorkshire.

== Demography ==
The Pennine region is sparsely populated by English standards. Larger population centres are in the foothills and lowlands fringing the southern Pennine range, such as Barnsley, Chesterfield, Halifax, Huddersfield, Macclesfield, Oldham, Bury, Rochdale, Middleton, and Stockport but most of the northern Pennine range is thinly populated. The cities of Bradford, Derby, Leeds, Manchester, Sheffield, Stoke-on-Trent and Wakefield are also in the surrounding foothills and lowlands. The Pennines contain the highest village in the United Kingdom, Flash, at 1,519 feet (463 m), near the southern end of the range in Staffordshire.

== Economy ==
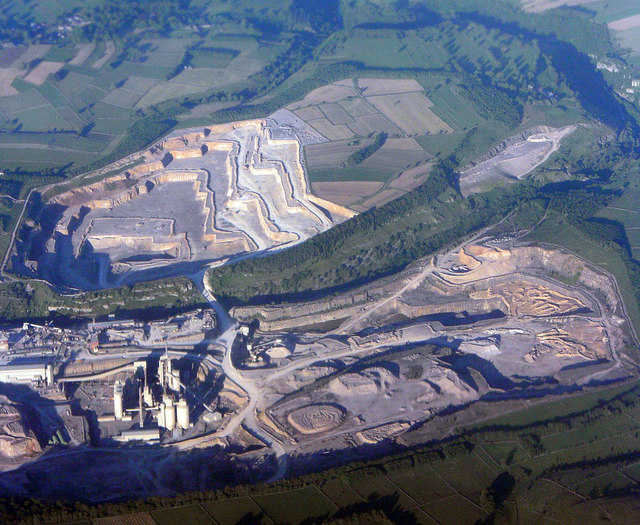
Tunsted Quarry, Peak District

The main economic activities in the Pennines include sheep farming, quarrying, finance and tourism. In the Peak District, tourism is the major local employment for park residents (24%), with manufacturing industries (19%) and quarrying (12%) also being important while 12% are employed in agriculture. Limestone is the most important mineral quarried, mainly for roads and cement, while other extracted materials include shale for cement and gritstone for building stone. The springs at Buxton and Ashbourne are exploited to produce bottled mineral water and there are approximately 2,700 farms in the National Park. The South Pennines are predominantly industrial, with the main industries including textiles, quarrying and mining, while other economic activities within the South Pennines include tourism and farming.

Although the Forest of Bowland is mostly rural, the main economic activities in the area include farming and tourism. In the Yorkshire Dales, tourism accounts for £350 million of expenditure every year while employment is mostly dominated by farming, accommodation and food sectors. There are also significant challenges for managing tourism, farming and other developments within the National Park. The main economic activities in the North Pennines include tourism, farming, timber and small-scale quarrying, due to the rural landscape.

== Transport ==
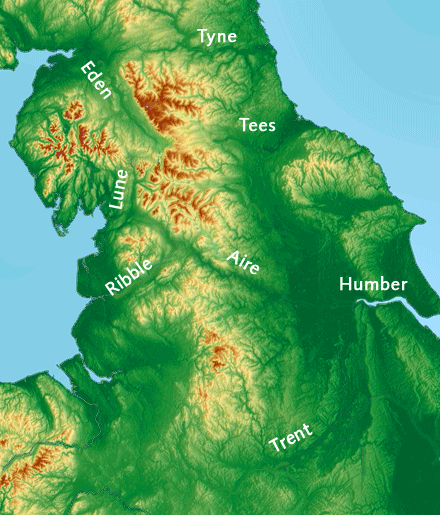
The Pennines are traversed by several passes, mostly aligned with major rivers

Gaps that allow west–east communication across the Pennines include the Tyne Gap between the Pennines and the Cheviots, through which the A69 road and Tyne Valley railway link Carlisle and Newcastle upon Tyne. The A66 road, its summit at 1,450 feet (440 m), follows the course of a Roman road from Scotch Corner to Penrith through the Stainmore Gap between the Eden Valley in Cumbria and Teesdale in County Durham. The Aire Gap links Lancashire and Yorkshire via the valleys of the Aire and Ribble. Other high-level roads include Buttertubs Pass, named from limestone potholes near its 1,729-foot (527 m) summit, between Hawes in Wensleydale and Swaledale and the A684 road from Sedbergh to Hawes via Garsdale Head which reaches 1,100 feet (340 m).

Further south the A58 road traverses the Calder Valley between West Yorkshire and Greater Manchester reaching 1,282 feet (391 m) between Littleborough and Ripponden, while the A646 road along the Calder Valley between Burnley and Halifax reaches 764 feet (233 m) following valley floors. In the Peak District the A628 Woodhead road links the M67 motorway in Greater Manchester with the M1 motorway in South Yorkshire and Holme Moss is crossed by the A6024 road, whose highest point is near Holme Moss transmitting station between Longdendale and Holmfirth.

The Pennines are traversed by the M62 motorway, the highest motorway in England at 1,221 feet (372 m) on Windy Hill near Junction 23.

Three trans-Pennine canals built during the Industrial Revolution cross the range:

- The Huddersfield Narrow Canal connects Huddersfield in the east with Manchester in the west. When it reaches Marsden, it passes under the range through the Standedge Tunnel to Diggle. Fortnightly during the summer season, one can pass through the tunnel on a public narrowboat.
- The Rochdale Canal crosses the Pennines via Rochdale, connecting the market town of Sowerby Bridge with Manchester.
- The Leeds and Liverpool Canal, the longest and most northerly, crosses the Pennines via Skipton, Burnley, Chorley and Wigan connecting Leeds in the east with Liverpool in the west.

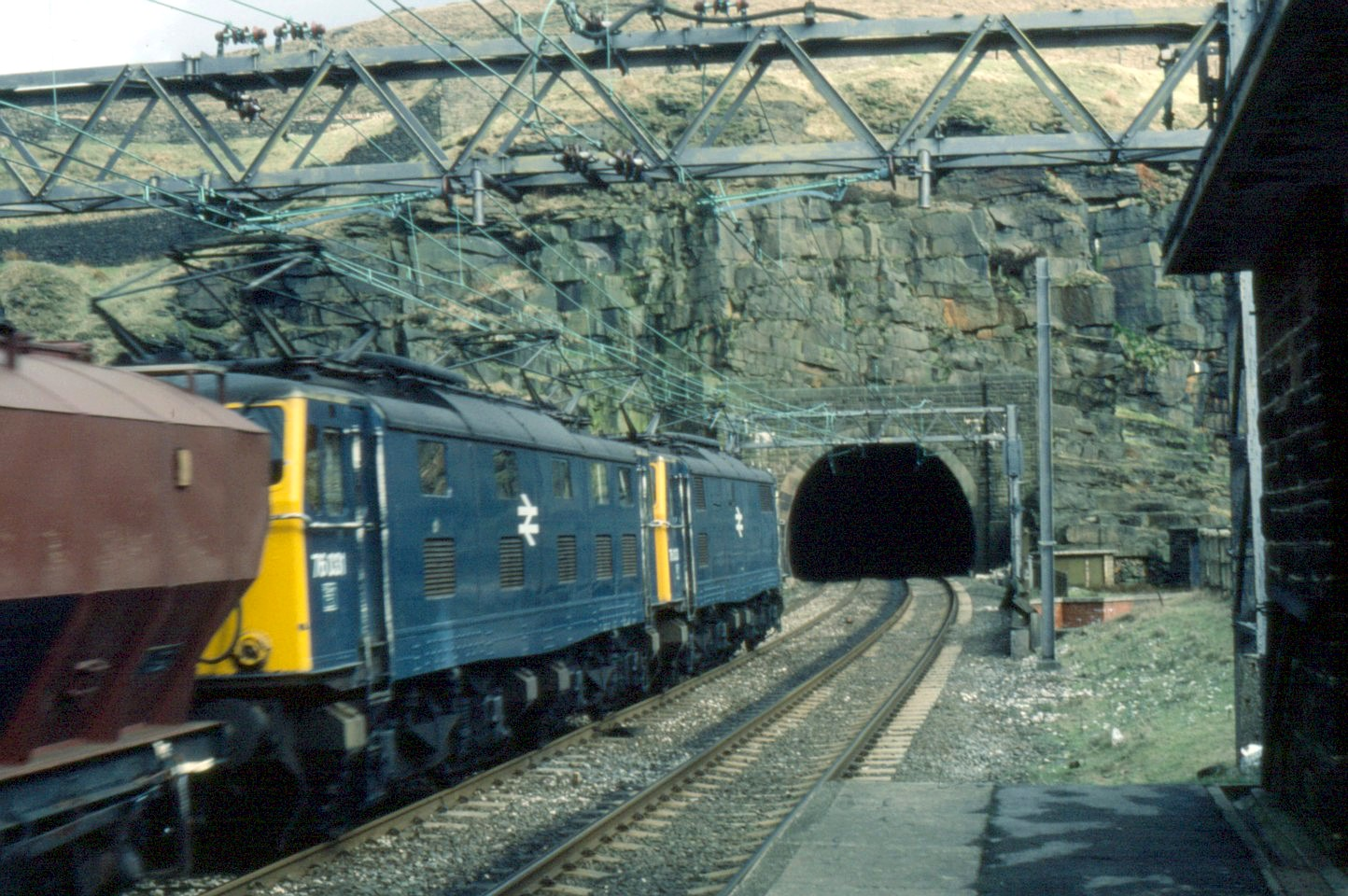
A British Rail train about to enter the western portal of Woodhead 3, shortly before closure in 1981

The first of three Woodhead Tunnels was completed by the Sheffield, Ashton-Under-Lyne and Manchester Railway in 1845, engineered by Charles Vignoles and Joseph Locke. At the time of its completion in 1845, Woodhead 1 was one of the world's longest railway tunnels at a length of 3 miles 13 yards (4,840 m); it was the first of several trans-Pennine tunnels including the Standedge and Totley tunnels, which are only slightly longer. The first two tunnels were replaced by Woodhead 3, which was longer at 3 miles 66 yards (4860m). It was bored for the overhead electrification of the route and completed in 1953. The tunnel was opened by the transport minister Alan Lennox-Boyd on 3 June 1954. It was designed by Sir William Halcrow & Partners. The line was closed in 1981.

The London and North Western Railway acquired the Huddersfield and Manchester Railway in 1847 and built a single-line tunnel parallel to the canal tunnel at Standedge with a length of 3 miles, 57 yards (4803 m). Today rail services along the Huddersfield line between Huddersfield and Victoria and Piccadilly stations in Manchester are operated by TransPennine Express and Northern. Between 1869 and 1876 the Midland Railway built the Settle-Carlisle Line through remote, scenic regions of the Pennines from near Settle to Carlisle passing Appleby-in-Westmorland and other settlements, some a distance from their stations. The line has survived, despite difficult times and is operated by Northern Rail.

The Trans Pennine Trail, a long-distance route for cyclists, horse riders and walkers, runs west–east alongside rivers and canals, along disused railway tracks and through historic towns and cities from Southport to Hornsea (207 miles/333 km). It crosses the north–south Pennine Way (268 miles/431 km) at Crowden-in-Longdendale.

== National Parks and AONBs ==
National parks and AONBs in Northern England, of which the Pennines mostly cover the middle part.

Considerable areas of the Pennines are protected as UK national parks and Areas of Outstanding Natural Beauty (AONBs). Areas of Outstanding Natural Beauty, also known as "national landscapes", are afforded much the same protection as national parks. The national parks within the Pennines are the Peak District National Park and the Yorkshire Dales National Park with the Northumberland National Park sometimes also included.

The North Pennines AONB just north of the Yorkshire Dales rivals the national park in size and includes some of the Pennines' highest peaks and its most isolated and sparsely populated areas. Other AONBs are Nidderdale east of the Yorkshire Dales, and the Bowland Fells, including Pendle Hill, west of the Yorkshire Dales.

The only significant unprotected section is the area between Skipton and Marsden.

== Language ==
The language used in pre-Roman and Roman times was Common Brittonic. During the Early Middle Ages, the Cumbric language developed. Little evidence of Cumbric remains, so it is difficult to ascertain whether or not it was distinct from Old Welsh. The extent of the region in which Cumbric was spoken is also unknown.

During Anglo-Saxon times the area was settled by Anglian peoples of Mercia and Northumbria, rather than the Saxon people of Southern England. Celtic speech remained in most areas of the Pennines longer than it did in the surrounding areas of England. Eventually, the Celtic tongue of the Pennines was replaced by early English as Anglo-Saxons and Vikings settled the area and assimilated the Celts.

During the Viking Age Scandinavian settlers brought their language, Old Norse. The fusion of Norse influences into Old English was important in the formation of Middle English and hence Modern English, and many individual words of Norse descent remain in use in local dialects, such as that of Yorkshire, and in local place names.

== Folklore and customs ==
The folklore and customs are mostly based on Celtic, Anglo-Saxon and Viking customs and folklore. Many customs and stories have their origin in Christianised pagan traditions. In the Peak District, a notable custom is well dressing, which has its origin in pagan traditions that became Christianised.

== Flora ==
Flora in the higher Pennines is adapted to moorland and subarctic landscapes and climates. The flora found there can be found in other areas of moorland in Northern Europe and some species are also found in areas of tundra. In the Pennine millstone grit areas above an altitude of 900 feet (270 m) the topsoil is so acidic, pH 2 to 4, that it can grow only bracken, heather, sphagnum, and coarse grasses such as cottongrass, purple moor grass and heath rush. As the Ice age glacial sheets retreated c. 11,500 BC trees returned and archaeological palynology can identify their species. The first trees to settle were willow, birch and juniper, followed later by alder and pine. By 6500 BC temperatures were warmer and woodlands covered 90% of the dales with mostly pine, elm, lime and oak. On the limestone soils the oak was slower to colonize and pine and birch predominated. Around 3000 BC a noticeable decline in tree pollen indicates that neolithic farmers were clearing woodland to increase grazing for domestic livestock, and studies at Linton Mires and Eshton Tarn find an increase in grassland species. On poorly drained impermeable areas of millstone grit, shale or clays the topsoil gets waterlogged in winter and spring. Here tree suppression combined with the heavier rainfall results in blanket bog up to 7 ft (2 m) thick. The erosion of peat still exposes stumps of ancient trees.

"In digging it away they frequently find vast fir trees, perfectly sound, and some oaks ..."

— Arthur Young, A Six Months' Tour of the North of England (1770)

Limestone areas of the Pennines in the White Peak, Yorkshire Dales and Upper Teesdale have been designated as nature reserves or Important Plant Areas by the botanical conservation charity Plantlife, and are nationally important for their wildflowers.

== Fauna ==
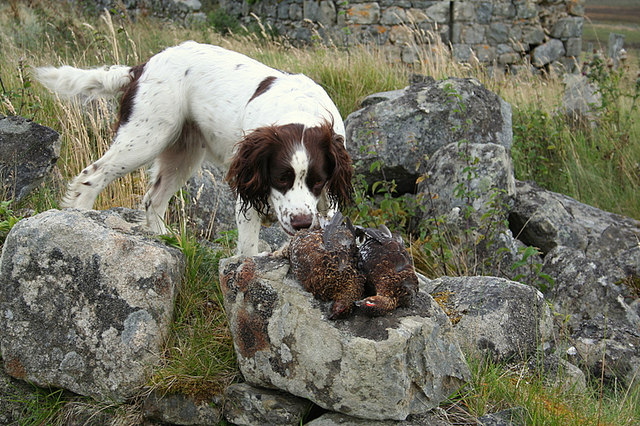
Shooting of red grouse is an economically important activity in the Pennines.

Fauna in the Pennines is similar to the rest of England and Wales, but the area hosts some specialised species. Deer are found throughout the Pennines and some species of animals that are rare elsewhere in England can be found here. Arctic hares, which were common in Britain during the Ice Age and retreated to the cooler, more tundra-like uplands once the climate warmed up, were introduced to the Dark Peak area of the Peak District in the 19th century.

Large areas of heather moorland in the Pennines are managed for driven shooting of wild red grouse. The related and declining black grouse is still found in northern parts of the Pennines. Other birds whose English breeding strongholds are in the Pennines include golden plover, snipe, curlew, dunlin, merlin, short-eared owl, ring ouzel and twite, though many of these are at the southern limit of their distributions and are more common in Scotland.

== See also ==
- Geography of England
- Geology of Great Britain
- Geology of Yorkshire
- North Pennines
- South Pennines
- Yorkshire Three Peaks
