= Clwyd Limestone Group =

Stratigraphic unit in Wales

- Stratigraphic range: Lower Carboniferous
- Type: Group
- Unit of: Carboniferous Limestone Supergroup
- Sub-units: Cefn Mawr Limestone, Loggerheads Limestone, Red Wharf Limestone, Llanarmon Limestone, Leete Limestone, Foel and Minera formations
- Underlies: Pentre Chert Formation or Cefn-y-fedw Sandstone Formation
- Overlies: 'Basement Beds' (conformably), Lower Palaeozoic rocks (unconformably)
- Thickness: Up to 900 m

Lithology
- Primary: limestone
- Other: mudstone, sandstone

Location
- Region: North Wales
- Extent: Clwyd (NE Wales) and west to Anglesey

Type section
- Named for: Clwyd

The Clwyd Limestone Group is a stratigraphic unit (a defined sequence of rock layers) of Chadian to Brigantian age (Lower Carboniferous) found in north Wales. It forms part of the Carboniferous Limestone Supergroup. Its most extensive outcrop is along the length of the Clwydian Range, immediately to the east of its crest, between Llandegla and Prestatyn. A further though more fragmented outcrop extends in an arc along the western margins of the Vale of Clwyd north from Rhyd-y-meudwy, west of Ruthin and then northwest to meet the coast at Llanddulas. It is prominently exposed at the Great Orme and Little Orme near Llandudno and again in three areas of eastern and southern Anglesey, together with a small area to the south of the Menai Strait between Bangor and Y Felinheli. The outcrop also extends southwards from Llandegla to form an impressive scarp at Creigiau Eglwyseg north of Llangollen and south again, to the west of Oswestry to Llanymynech Hill on the Powys/Shropshire border.

In Anglesey, it comprises the Loggerheads Limestone Formation and overlying Cefn Mawr Limestone Formation. These are supplemented at the Great Orme by an underlying Llanarmon Limestone Formation and an overlying Red Wharf Limestone Formation, both of which are dolomitic, at least in part. In the Clwydian Range, a lowermost Foel Formation is succeeded in turn by the Llanarmon Limestone, Leete Limestone, Loggerheads Limestone and Cefn Mawr Limestone formations. These are capped by the limestones and sandstones of the Minera Formation which completes the sequence. The outcrop in the west of the Vale of Clwyd is similar but narrower and lacking the Foel Formation. The outcrop south of Llandegla comprises only the Leete, Cefn Mawr and Minera units. There is a small faulted inlier of the Clwyd Limestone around Ffrith to the northwest of Wrexham and a smaller outlier of the Clwyd Limestone just to the west of Corwen.

== See also ==
- List of types of limestone
