= Humber Gap =

Geological term in England

Coordinates: 53.7012°N 0.477047°W

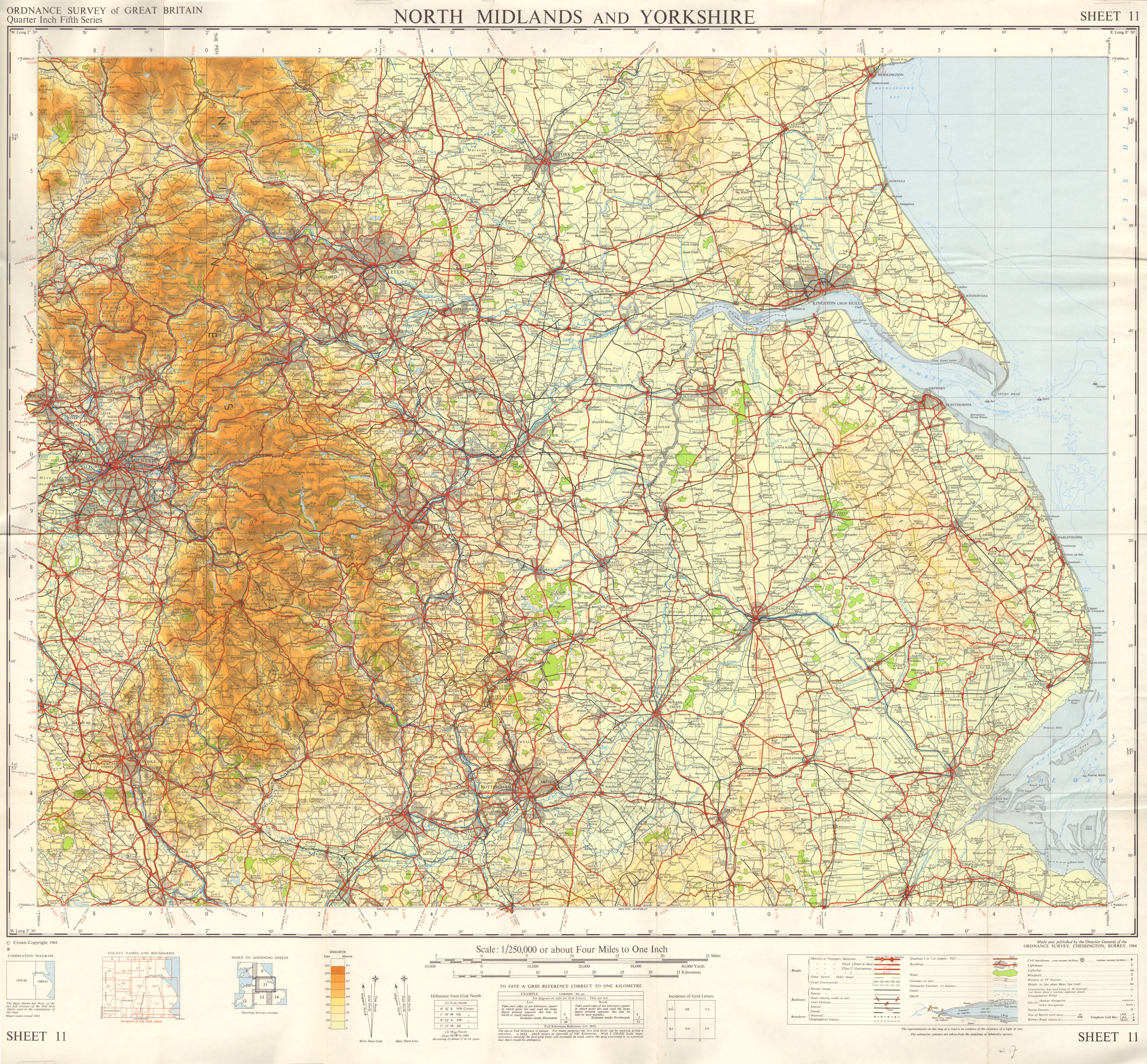
Map showing the Lincolnshire Wolds and the southern part of the Yorkshire Wolds, separated by the Humber west of Kingston upon Hull

The Humber Gap is a term for the geographic gap between the roughly north–south running line of hills formed by the Yorkshire Wolds and the Lincolnshire Wolds, formed by the west–east running Humber Estuary.

In the geological past the gap has formed part of an ice barrier due to glaciers during the ice age resulting in damming and formation of a 'Humber Lake', and also forms a geological division.

In modern times the gap has formed a natural choice for transport routes, such as the railways. The Humber Bridge also crosses the Humber close to the gap.

== See also ==
- Humberhead Levels: very heavily silted area formed west of the gap as a result of the damming of the gap, and subsequent lake formation
- North Ferriby and South Ferriby, villages on the two sides of the Humber named after the ferries across the gap.
