= Billinge Hill, Blackburn =

Hill in Blackburn, Lancashire, England

Billinge Hill
- Location within England

Highest point
- Elevation: 246 m (807 ft)
- Coordinates: 53°44′56″N 2°31′23″W

Geography
- Location: Blackburn, Blackburn with Darwen, England
- OS grid: SD656282
- Topo map: OS Landranger 103

Billinge Hill is a prominent 246-metre-high (807 ft) wooded hill on the western edge of the town of Blackburn in the borough of Blackburn with Darwen in northwest England. Access to its summit from nearby roads is by various public footpaths, some of which also serve as concessionary bridleways. Immediately below its southern slopes are a series of copses linked by paths, which together with the hill form Witton Country Park. Billinge Hill, like the nearby hill on which Hoghton Tower stands, is formed from a band of the hard-wearing Revidge Grit, a sandstone within the Carboniferous age Millstone Grit.
