= Craven Fault System =

Geological faulting across the Craven District of North Yorkshire, England

The Craven Fault System is the name applied by geologists to the group of crustal faults in the Pennines that form the southern edge of the Askrigg Block and which partly bounds the Craven Basin. Sections of the system's component faults which include the North, Middle and South Craven faults and the Feizor Fault are evident at the surface in the form of degraded faults scarps where Carboniferous Limestone abuts millstone grit. The fault system is approximately coincident with the southwestern edge of the Yorkshire Dales National Park and the northeastern edge of the Bowland Fells.

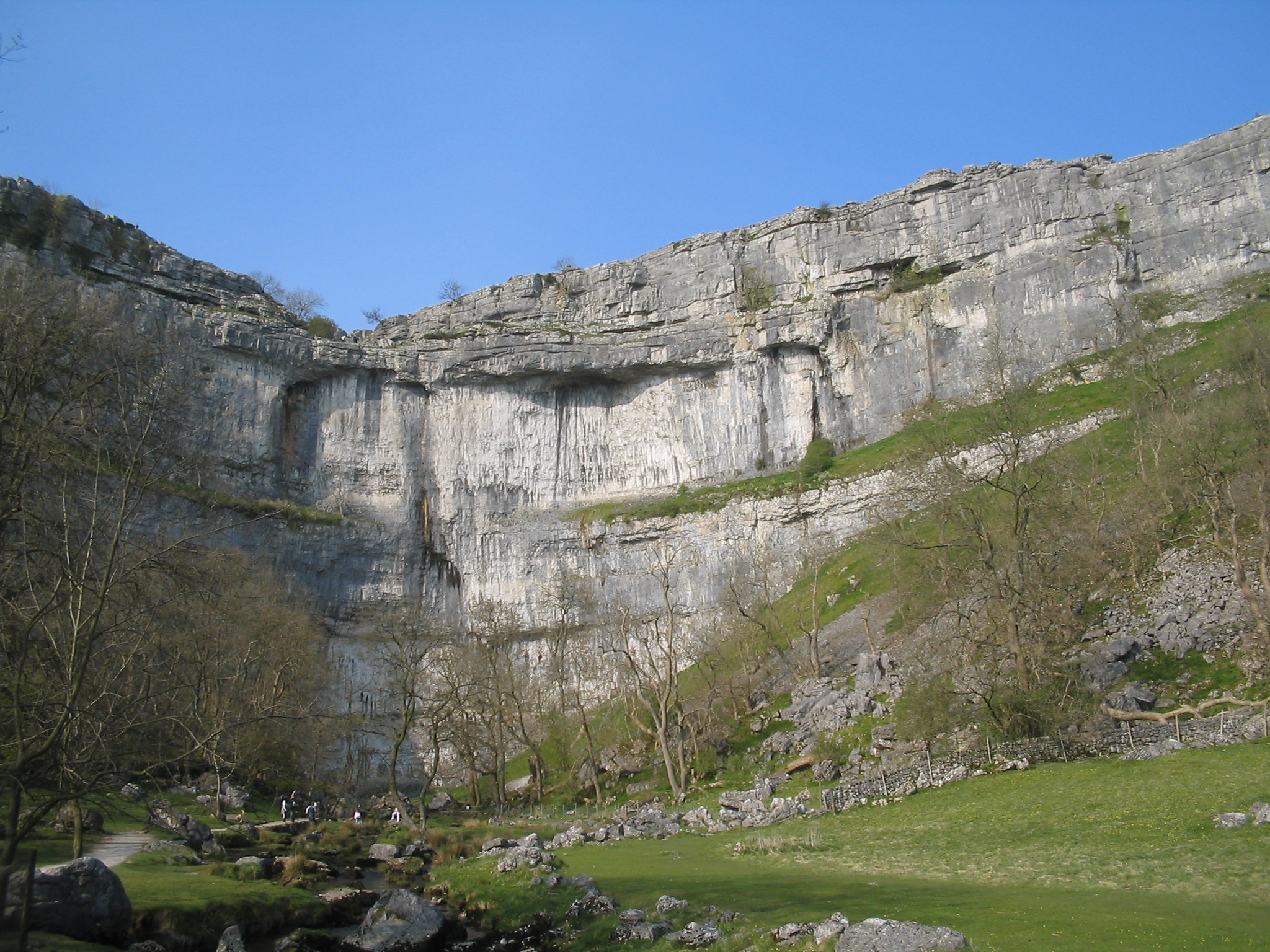
Malham Cove cliff face may have formed as a fault scarp on the Middle Craven Fault but has since retreated ca. 600 m

== Location ==
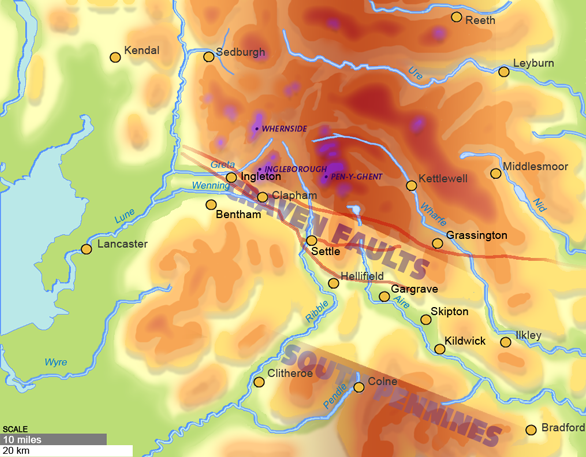
The Craven Faults define the north edge of the Craven Basin and the Aire Gap

The Craven Faults are major crustal fractures across the Pennines. These faults constitute a zone crossing the backbone of England from west to east commencing near Leck, Lancashire at 54.190507°N 2.527339°W then branching three ways:

- The North Craven Fault extends about 50 kilometres (30 mi) to 54.074°N 1.800°W.
- The Mid Craven Fault extends about 36 kilometres (20 mi) to 54.070°N 2.075°W.
- The South Craven Fault extends about 39 kilometres (20 mi) to 54.066°N 2.042°W.

The Craven Gap is sometimes called the Aire Gap, but to do so necessitates including the Aire Fault; that runs from the south end of the South Craven Fault: from Gargrave towards Leeds. Although of less amplitude than the three Craven faults the course of the Aire Fault is made more apparent by the River Aire. The broad Aire Gap separates the Yorkshire Dales from the Bowland Fells and the Millstone Grit plateaux of the South Pennines.

== Geological age ==
The strata along the River Twiss, Ingleton, below Quaternary terminal moraine at Raven Ray

The fault system comprises the North Craven Fault, Middle Craven Fault, South Craven Fault and Feizor Fault along with various other unnamed faults. The Middle Craven Fault moved mainly during Carboniferous times and marks the southern limit of the Askrigg Block. However the North and South Craven faults continued to be active into post-Triassic times. The Great Scar Limestone is exposed north of the Middle Craven Fault at Malham Cove and at Gordale Scar and along the South Craven Fault at Giggleswick Scar.

== Erosion ==
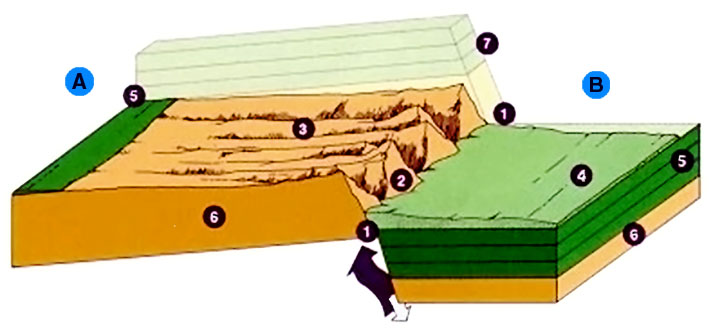
A. Upthrown fault block; B. Downthrown fault block; 1. Fault zone; 2. Steep face; 3. Gentle slope; 4. Valley filled with eroded surface runoff; 5. Sedimentary rock layers; 6. Bedrock; 7. Sedimentary rock layers worn away; these matched layers 5.

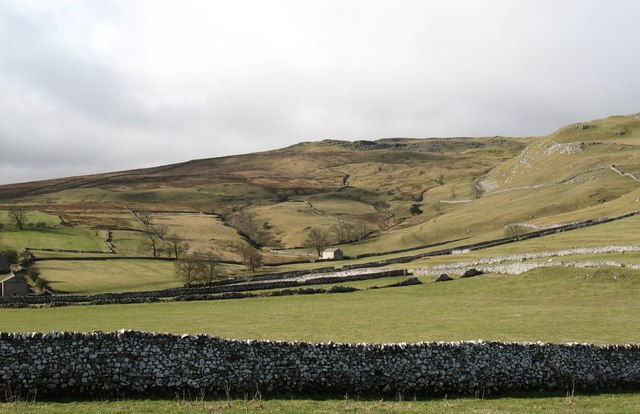
Here the central hill is of sandstone whereas that on the right is of limestone.

The Great Scar Limestone is over 200 metres thick and the overlying Yoredale Series was over 300 metres thick before weathering. The vertical throw of the fault zone is up to 1,800 m (5,906 ft).

Near Ingleton, North Yorkshire the North Craven Fault has a downthrow of about 200 metres (660 ft), and a few hundred yards away the South Craven Fault has a downthrow of about 1,200 metres (3,900 ft). The fault plane of the North Craven Fault is exposed in Swilla Glen.

Charles Darwin used the Craven Fault to illustrate how nature can so well conceal dramatic events: "The Craven Fault, for instance, extends for upwards of 30 miles, and along this line the vertical displacement of strata has varied from 600 to 3000 feet."

== Gallery ==
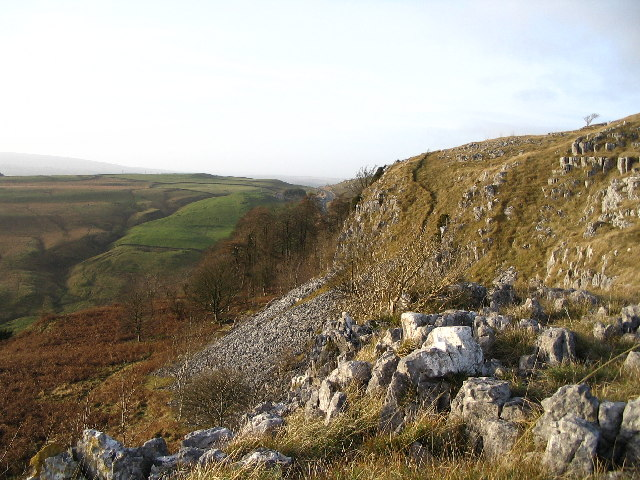
Giggleswick Scar

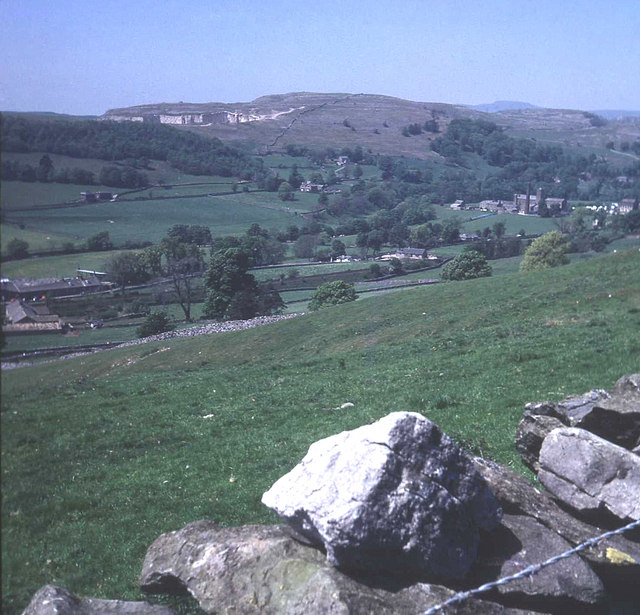
View NW across Ribble to Giggleswick Scar

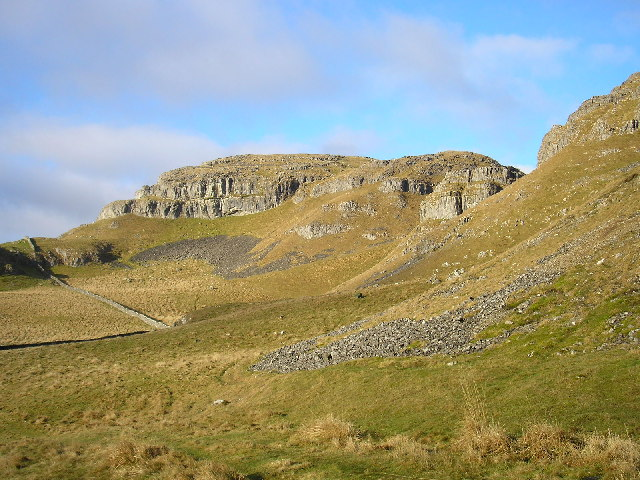
Warrendale Knotts

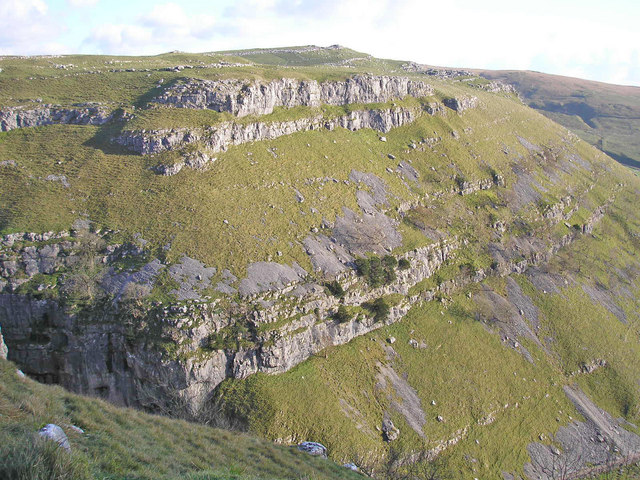
Cross Field Knotts
