= Humberhead Levels =

National character area in England

Coordinates: 53.664°N 0.925°W

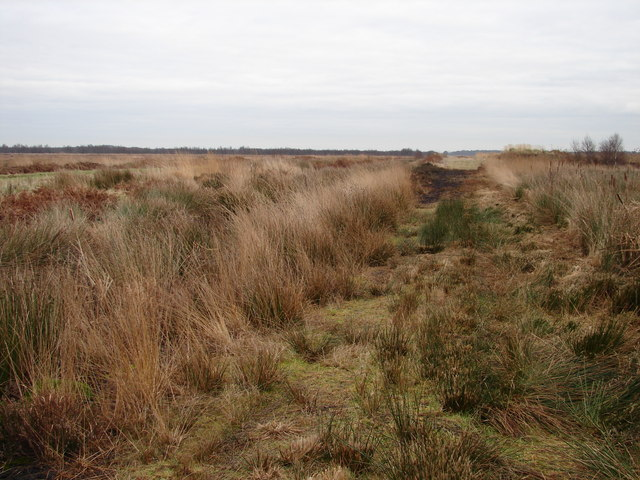
A footpath through the Humberhead nature reserve

The Humberhead Levels is a national character area covering a large expanse of flat, low-lying land towards the western end of the Humber estuary in northern England. The levels occupy the former Glacial Lake Humber, an area bounded to the east by the Yorkshire Wolds and the northern Lincoln Edge, a limestone escarpment, and to the west by the southern part of the Yorkshire magnesian limestone ridge. In the north the levels merge into the slightly more undulating Vale of York close to the Escrick glacial moraine, and to the south merge into the Trent Vale.

== Glacial Lake Humber ==
During the last ice age, a glacier extended across this area almost to where Doncaster now is. The main glacial front was at Escrick where the Escrick moraine marks its furthest extension. This was the northern limit of an extensive lake which was impounded by the blocking of the Humber Gap by another ice front. The lake bottom gradually filled with clay sediments which are up to 20 metres (66 ft) thick. The clay sediments are locally overlain by peat deposits forming raised mires. At the base of the peat layers are the remains of a buried forest.

== Early settlement ==
The Humberhead Levels have been settled for several thousand years. The drier northern area was settled before the Roman era. The lighter soils there were easier to drain with hand tools, and the area was extensively cleared for small-scale pastoral farming. The system of easily navigable rivers was used by invading late fifth- and sixth-century Angles and eighth- and ninth-century Vikings who were able to penetrate deep into the countryside.
