= Askrigg Block =

The Askrigg Block is the name applied by geologists to the crustal block forming a part of the Pennines of northern England and which is essentially coincident with the Yorkshire Dales. It is defined by the Dent Fault to the west and the Craven Fault System to the south whilst to the north it is separated from the Alston Block by the Stainmore Trough. It originated as a geological structure during the Carboniferous Period as a major element in the Pennine Block & Basin Province.
