= Frack Off =

British anti-fracking campaign

- Founded: 2011
- Purpose: Environmental protection
- Location: British Isles
- Method: Direct action
- Website: frack-off.org.uk

Frack Off is a grassroots direct action campaign aimed at stopping the extraction of unconventional resources in the UK, specifically concentrating on unconventional gas extraction.

== History ==
Frack Off began with a campaign against the use of hydraulic fracturing, colloquially known as fracking for shale gas extraction with a banner drop from Blackpool Tower on 6 August 2011, which also launched the website www.frack-off.org.uk.

On 2 November 2011, the Frack Off activists stormed Cuadrilla Resources' drilling site at Banks in Lancashire at 5:30am and four activists scaled the drilling rig and dropped banners. The action was timed to coincide with an industry conference, the Shale Gas Environmental Summit, in London and the release of an independent report commissioned by Cuadrilla Resources which said that its fracking in Lancashire may have triggered two small earthquakes. Fracking later resumed, after changes to reduce the risk.

Frack Off jointly organised "Camp Frack" with Campaign against Climate Change in March 2012. The camp was a weekend event with anti-fracking activists from around the UK coming together with local people from around Lancashire where test drilling for fracking is most advanced in the UK. Camp Frack was attended by around 150 people and consisted of workshops around education, sustainable living, movement building and direct action. The Camp culminated in a march to the drilling site where Cuadrilla is currently drilling for shale gas.

Since then the campaign has broadened out to a campaign against coal bed methane and underground coal gasification too.

In summer 2013, the organization was involved in the Balcombe drilling protest near Balcombe in the Weald Basin in Sussex where Cuadrilla was engaged in oil exploration.

== See also ==
- Anti-fracking movement
- Environmental direct action in the United Kingdom
- Environmental impact of hydraulic fracturing
- Extinction Rebellion
- Hydraulic fracturing in the United Kingdom
