= Shale gas in the United Kingdom =

Shale gas in the United Kingdom has attracted increasing attention since 2007, when unconventional onshore shale gas production was proposed. The first shale gas well in England was drilled in 1875. As of 2013 a number of wells had been drilled, and favourable tax treatment had been offered to shale gas producers.

In July 2013, UK Prime Minister David Cameron had claimed that, "fracking has real potential to drive energy bills down". However, in November 2013 representatives from industry and government, such as former BP Chief Executive and government advisor Lord Browne, Energy Secretary Ed Davey and economist Lord Stern said that fracking in the UK alone will not lower prices as the UK is part of a well connected European market. As of April 2022, there had been no commercial production of shale gas in the UK, with no shale gas reserves booked in the UK. In February 2022 the Oil & Gas Authority (OGA) ordered the "plugging and abandonment" of Britain's shale wells.

== Areas ==
The Department of Energy and Climate Change (DECC) originally identified large areas of eastern and southern England as having the "best shale gas potential":

The main area identified runs from just south of Middlesbrough in a crescent through East Yorkshire, Lincolnshire, Northamptonshire, Buckinghamshire and the Cotswolds to Somerset and Wiltshire. It then turns along the South Coast and Downs, including most of Dorset, Hampshire, Sussex, Surrey and Kent. Shale gas sites are under investigation in the Sussex commuter belt, near Haywards Heath, the Mendip Hills, south of Bath, in Kent, Lincolnshire, south Wales, Staffordshire and Cheshire, as well as more sites near the existing find in Lancashire.

However the British Geological Survey report released in October 2014 said that there was little potential for shale gas in the Weald Basin as the field has not yet reached thermal maturation.

=== Bowland Basin ===
In August 2010, Cuadrilla Resources started drilling Britain's first shale gas exploration well, the Preese-Hall-1 in the Bowland Basin. The well penetrated 800m of organic-rich shale. The company hydraulically fractured the well in early 2011, but suspended the operation when it triggered two seismic events of magnitudes (M_{L}) 2.3 and 1.5, the larger of which was felt by at least 23 people at the surface. Work on the well stopped in May 2011, and the government declared a moratorium on hydraulic fracturing that was sustained until December 2012, subject to additional controls to limit seismic risk.

In September 2011, Cuadrilla announced a huge discovery of 200 trillion cubic feet (Tcf) of gas in place under the Fylde Coast in Lancashire. Cuadrilla stated that it would be happy if it could recover 10–20% of the gas in place. Lord Browne ignored this latter point in media interviews, claiming that the Lancashire discovery could satisfy the UK's gas consumption "for 56 years", with similar, sensational media reports claiming that the find was "so rich it could meet Britain's needs for decades", or that it had "the potential to do more for Lancashire than the cotton industry." (For comparison, the cotton industry in Lancashire employed, at peak penetration in 1811, 37% of the county, or about 70,000 people; Cuadrilla believes fracking will create 1,700 jobs in Lancashire, current population 1.1m). The British Geological Survey—responsible for producing inventories of the UK's mineral resources, and far more cautious in its estimates—felt prompted, however, to re-evaluate its projections in light of the find, which Cuadrilla believes could provide 5,600 jobs in the UK at the peak of production. Industry estimates suggest shale gas in Lancashire alone could deliver £6bn of gas a year for the next three decades.

In 2011 and 2012, IGas Energy drilled a deep well to evaluate shale gas, and found gas shows in the Bowland Shale, with total organic content averaging 2.7%. The formation was reported to be thermally mature, in the wet gas window. IGAS bought large blocks of gas licences in 2011, much of which is reportedly prospective for shale gas. IGas announced that it would drill a well to evaluate shale gas at Barton, near Manchester. Drilling would begin in October 2013, and take two to three months. IGas has not applied for a permit to hydraulically fracture the well.

In July 2013, Cuadrilla applied for a permit to hydraulically fracture its previously drilled well at the Grange Hill site. In April 2014, Cuadrilla published news of their continuing consultation with residents shale gas exploration sites in the Fylde.

As of June 2013, the Bowland Basin was the only area in the UK where wells have been drilled specifically for shale gas. Four wells have been drilled by Cuadrilla Resources, and one by IGAS Energy. None of the wells have produced gas.

In 2019 Lancashire Constabulary estimated the cost of policing fracking in the county, between June 2017 and June 2019, as £11.745m.

=== Weald Basin ===
A British Geological Survey report from May 2014 indicated that there was little potential for shale gas fracturing in the Weald Basin, south of London.

=== Northern Ireland ===
According to February 2013 reports from PricewaterhouseCoopers, there could be £80 billion in reserves in Northern Ireland, although these claims were criticised as being sensationalist.

=== National Parks: North York Moors, Peak District, South Downs and Yorkshire Dales ===
As of 2015, the Durham Energy Institute examined the likelihood of drilling in National Parks. The parks with geologies of interest are the North York Moors, the Peak District, the South Downs and to the south of the Yorkshire Dales.

== Resource estimates ==
According to a 2011 report of the Energy and Climate Change Select Committee, "Shale gas resources in the UK could be considerable—particularly offshore—but are unlikely to be a "game changer" to the same extent as they have been in the US, where the shale gas revolution has led to a reduction in natural gas prices." The Committee's chairperson, Tim Yeo, revised his personal opinion in 2012, however, and argued shale gas is a "game changer" that could "transform the UK's energy independence". Interest in fracking came just as imports of gas to the UK had surpassed domestic production in 2011 for the first time since the 1960s.

Estimating the size of recoverable resource is difficult due to the uncertainty of the usually small percentage of shale gas that is recoverable. In addition, companies may embrace large estimations of reserves to boost share prices. In the United States, companies had been subpoenaed in 2011 on suspicion that the projections they provided to investors, including press-release figures, were inflated. In 2012, national agencies in the U.S. and Poland revised dramatically downward their estimates of shale gas resources.

Part of the problem in evaluation is also the uncertainty of decline curve analysis from early data: shale gas wells can fall off sharply during the first year or two, then level off to a slower decline rate; the shape of the curve, and therefore the ultimate recovery, is difficult to predict from early production rates.

Before drilling, IGas estimated gas in place of 4.6 Tcf in the Ince Marshes site, though it was unlikely that more than 20% of it could be recoverable; After drilling their first well, IGas announced that the estimated gas in place was at least double their previous estimate, without presenting the technical evidence for the revision.

In early 2012, Celtique Energie estimated that there might be as much as 14 Tcf of recoverable reserves potential in countryside south of Horsham, West Sussex. Preliminary estimates in 2011 suggested that there may be £70bn worth of shale gas in South Wales, and 1.5bn bbl oil equivalent in Northern Ireland according to a report by PwC. These are speculative resource estimates not reserves. (Note: to be classified as reserves by SEC rules requires as a minimum, volumes in the ground that are economically viable to recover to the surface using existing technology. All other gas in the ground are considered resources and as a result, are less certain) To date, there are no published commercial reserves of Shale Gas anywhere in Europe.

=== British Geological Survey ===
In June 2013, the British Geological Survey estimated the gas in place within the Bowland Shale of central Britain to be within the range of 822 Tcf to 2281 Tcf, with a central estimate of 1,329 trillion cubic feet (37,600 km^{3}), but did not estimate how much of the gas was likely to be recoverable, and cautioned:

"Estimates of the amount of recoverable gas and the gas resources are variable. It is possible that the shale gas resources in UK are very large. However, despite the size of the resource, the proportion that can be recovered is the critical factor."

Industry estimates were that about 10% of gas in place could be extracted. 130 Tcf would supply Britain's gas needs for about 50 years.

Comment from the British Geological Survey (BGS) suggested even more substantial shale gas potential offshore.

BGS updated their estimate in a joint 2019 paper with the University of Nottingham, finding that recoverable gas from shale is "~10 times lower than previously thought" and "considerably below 10 years supply at the current consumption". A 2018 paper by Durham and Newcastle Universities, which considered fracking's surface development requirements and its impact on existing infrastructure found that fracking would provide the equivalent of less than 3 years' gas usage.

=== US Energy Information Administration ===
In June 2013, the US Energy Information Administration issued a worldwide estimate of shale gas, which included an incomplete estimate of recoverable shale gas resources in the UK. The Carboniferous shale basins of North of England and Scotland, which include the Bowland Basin, were estimated to have 25 trillion cubic feet of recoverable shale gas. The Jurassic shales of the Wessex Basin and Weald Basin of southern England were estimated to have 600 billion cubic feet of recoverable shale gas and 700 million barrels of associated oil. The agency noted that the UK shale basins are more complex than those in the US, and therefore more costly to drill. On the other hand, as of June 2013, the price of natural gas in the United Kingdom was reported to be more than double the price in the US and Canada by one source and three times higher by other sources.

== Regulation ==
In 2012, a joint report by the Royal Society and Royal Association of Engineers (RS/RAE), commissioned by the government to identify the problems and advise regulatory agencies, emphasised that regulation "must be fit for purpose" with a focus on maintaining "regulatory co-ordination and capacity" and "the way in which risks scale up should a future shale gas industry develop nationwide." The government responded with a paper that outlined the requirements of the regulatory framework.

In January 2014, an impact assessment by the European Commission concluded that existing legal and regulatory environments for shale gas exploration and development were insufficient, and recommended a new directive with specific requirements for high volume hydraulic fracturing to address: "environmental risks and impacts"; allay "public concerns", and; "enable investments". In August 2016, the Environment Agency followed up their 2013 draft consultation with their final version on guidance for "flow testing and well stimulation, including hydraulic fracturing" for onshore operators in England.

Late in 2018, a former labour MP and parliamentarian of the year 2013, Natascha Engel, was appointed as the "UK commissioner for fracking". At about the same time, 49 geologists wrote joint letters to British broadsheet newspapers arguing that a limit of 0.5 on earthquakes around an active fracking site, above which fracking must cease, was too low. Cuadrilla, an oil and gas exploration firm, was unable to continue its fracking operation in Lancashire because minor earthquakes above this limit were occurring; they could not be detected by residents, but could by instrumentation, and were pretty clearly associated with the fracking activities, given their timing. On 28 April 2019, the commissioner for "fracking" has resigned, saying that development of fracking (in Lancashire area and the Bowland shale) was being "throttled" by rules preventing mini earthquakes of 0.5.

=== Criticism ===
In 2012, the joint Royal Society and Royal Academy of Engineering report was critical of current regulation which failed to ensure independence of the well examiner scheme by ensuring that the well examiner was independent of the operating company. The government responded: "there are a few well operators who wish to use in-house examiners, and that option is legally open to them if they can fulfil the DCR (Design and Construction Regulations) requirements of an appropriate level of impartiality and independence from any aspects of the well design/construction/operation."(paraphrase this instead of using quote)

== Climate change ==
Shale gas is largely methane, a hydrocarbon fuel. As such the carbon dioxide it produces contributes to global warming, although less so than coal. Of more concern is leaking or fugitive emissions of unburned methane, which is a greenhouse gas. It has been argued that, in opening a new source of hydrocarbons, it may reduce the incentive and financing of renewable sources of energy.

The 2008 Climate Change Act committed the UK to reducing CO_{2} emissions by 50% in 2030, and by 80% by 2050. In 2013, the UK generated 36% of its electricity from coal. The UK is much smaller than the USA, and European energy markets are different, so we extrapolate from the American studies with caution. That said, if shale gas were extracted in the UK, and if the price of shale gas were low enough, one would expect, as in America, (a) an increase in demand for gas; (b) a switch of electricity production from coal to gas; and (c) that UK shale gas production would substitute for a mix of UK production and imports, the latter of which could be by pipeline from Norway or the Continent or as LNG. Because the UK has strong links to the North West European gas market, production from unconventional gas in the UK alone is unlikely to have a significant impact on the wider European market price59 so the increase in gas demand and the coal-to-gas substitution are expected to be small. The first-order effect of the switch of electricity production from coal to gas would be to reduce the emissions-rate of the electricity production sector. Since this sector falls within the emissions trading scheme, there might be no effect on the overall emissions rate in the EU ETS (the reduction in electricity emissions would cause the value of emissions permits to fall slightly, and emissions-reduction effort in other sectors in the EU ETS would decline such that the emissions rate remained at the level set by the cap).

A 2011 study based in the United States found that, due to the fugitive emissions of methane, shale gas may produce more greenhouse gas emissions than coal. The study was criticised by other researchers,, but the authors argue that their data has since been corroborated by other studies.

A 2013 government-sponsored study of the effect of large-scale natural gas development in Britain concluded that emissions from shale gas could be consistent with meeting climate change targets so long as the emissions were counteracted by similar size reductions elsewhere in the world, although the authors suggest that 'without global climate policies...new fossil fuel exploitation is likely to lead to an increase in cumulative carbon emissions and the risk of climate change'.

In April 2014, the Intergovernmental Panel on Climate Change (IPCC) issued its 5th Assessment report. With regard to natural gas, and the shale gas debate, it states "GHG emissions from energy supply can be reduced significantly by replacing current world average coal‐fired power plants with modern, highly efficient natural gas combined‐cycle power plants or combined heat and power plants, provided that natural gas is available and the fugitive emissions associated with extraction and supply are low or mitigated (robust evidence, high agreement). In mitigation scenarios reaching about 450 ppm CO_{2}eq concentrations by 2100, natural gas power generation without CCS acts as a bridge technology, with deployment increasing before peaking and falling to below current levels by 2050 and declining further in the second half of the century (robust evidence, high agreement)".

In November 2014, the UK Energy Research Centre issued a report that stated "gas could play an important role as a 'bridging fuel' to a low-carbon economy, but warns that it won't be long before gas becomes part of the problem rather than the solution". It noted that the UK imports more than half its gas, and that "gas use beginning to fall in the late 2020s and early 2030s, with any major role beyond 2035 requiring the widespread use of carbon capture and storage" It also states "Instead of banking on shale, UKERC recommends rapidly expanding investment in alternative low-carbon energy sources and investing in more gas storage, which would help protect consumers against short-term supply disruption and price rises"

== Environmental impact ==
In 2012, the jointly published Royal Society and the Royal Academy of Engineering Shale Gas Review included recommendations on groundwater contamination, well integrity, seismic risk, gas leakage, noise pollution, water usage and disposal, management of environmental risk, implementation of best practice, with well integrity being "of key importance".

=== Air pollution ===
There are concerns, originating in the USA that drilling could lead to pollution from hydrocarbon based chemicals. Regulations in the UK call for total fluid and gas security meaning that in routine operations, no unburnt gases would be emitted. Venting of unburnt gas is only permitted for safety reasons or in an emergency.

=== Groundwater contamination ===
The British Geological Survey, in reviewing the US experience with hydraulic fracturing of shale formations, observed: "where the problems are genuinely attributable to shale gas operations, the problem is with poor well design and construction, rather than anything distinctive to shale gas."

Contamination of groundwater by methane can occur after the abandonment of the well: "Gas and other contaminants may accumulate slowly in these cracks, enter shallow strata or even leak at the surface many years after production or well abandonment. Even the presence of surface casing provides no assurance against gas leakage at the surface from the surrounding ground."

=== Land usage ===
Directional drilling allows a large hydrocarbon reservoir to be accessed using a single well pad, such as in Europe's biggest onshore oilfield, Wytch Farm. Likely well spacing visualised by the December 2013 DECC Strategic Environmental Assessment report indicated that well pad spacings of 5 km were likely in crowded areas, with up to 3 hectares per well pad. Each pad could have 24 separate wells. This amounts to 0.16% of land area.

In 2016, the Chartered Institute for Water and Environmental Management (CIWEM) stated that shale gas fields will potentially be "more extensive" than conventional onshore fields, using around 3.6 ha per shale gas well pad compared to 1.9 ha for conventional well pads, and that after "completion or abandonment" of a shale gas well pad, "it may not be possible to fully restore sites" "in areas of high agricultural, natural or cultural value".

=== Well integrity ===
According to Professor Mair, who chaired the joint review by the Royal Society and the Royal Academy of Engineering, "well integrity is of key importance".

In the first UK shale gas well, Preese Hall 1, the cement bond log (CBL) showed some places with poor cement behind the casing in the lowest 100 feet of the well, between zones in the production hole section, which were repaired to achieve better zone isolation. Without repair, production would have been compromised, but not the integrity of the well.

The magnitude 2.3M coseismic slip of 1 April 2011 caused casing deformation in "the lower section of the reservoir productive zone" of the Preese Hall 1 well. Well "integrity was not considered a risk" due to the "integrity of the casing, and the cement, in the upper completion", "confirmed by surface gas measurements and annular pressure readings".

==== Well leak concerns ====
It is commonly believed that '6% of wells leak immediately, 50% of wells leak after some time and all wells will leak eventually'. This is not an issue specific to shale gas exploration and production, it is a concern with every well that is drilled. This originates from a document that sells solutions for this problem to oil and gas companies. This often relates to 'SCP', or Sustained Casing Pressure This is a 'well barrier' issue, but could also include casing 'integrity' (external) leaks. Regulation calls for baseline monitoring to determine if any leak issues are related to the drilled well.

If a well were to leak, workover operations can usually fix leaks, by, for instance, perforating the casing above and below a poorly cemented zone, and 'squeezing' cement behind the pipe. The cement is drilled out and a pressure test is performed until pressure integrity is good.

In 2013, data from DECC was released concerning offshore and onshore well leaks from operating and abandoned wells and of the approx 2000 onshore wells, and approx 6500 offshore wells, the number of reported leaks between and 2008 and 2013 was zero,

In March 2014, ReFINE published a report that investigated well leak concerns, involving UK's producing, suspended, old, abandoned, and 'orphaned wells. It included a large number of data sets, from around the world, including some very old well data. There are issues of 'well barrier', where an internal leak is found, that does not leak to the environment, and 'well integrity' where external leaking/venting is an issue. The data provided often puts the two data sets together. In the ReFINE abstract, the percentage of wells that have had some form of well barrier or integrity failure is highly variable (1.9% to 75%).The ReFINE report does also indicate that there is no meaningful data on the bulk of the land based wells, and that only the 143 producing wells have been examined. The industry trade and advocacy group UKOOG welcomed the ReFINE report, stating that well leaks in the UK were little problem, and contrasted the small number of orphan wells with the estimated 250,000 abandoned mines.

Looking at the most recent results In a separate study of 3533 Pennsylvanian wells monitored between 2008 and 2011, there were 85 examples of cement or casing failures, 4 blowouts and 2 examples of gas venting. A November 2013 paper states Well-integrity failure occurs when all barriers fail and a leak is possible. True well-integrity failure rates are two to three orders of magnitude lower than single-barrier-failure rates.. Another paper from 2012 indicates that the bulk of the environment code violations in recent activity in Pennsylvania are nothing to do with well leaks.

A research paper by Watson and Bachu from 2009 indicates: Low cement top or exposed casing was found to be the most important indicator for sustained casing vent flow (SCVF)or gas migration (GM)SCVF/GM. The effect of low or poor cement was evaluated on the basis of the location of the SCVF/GM compared to the cement top. The vast majority of SCVF/GM originates from formations not isolated by cement. The current regulations from the HSE are designed to mitigate these concerns, and seal wells back to the surface.

Concern has been raised about some wells drilled before the latest guidelines that do have potential leak paths. An internal memo shows on page 3 that there is no cement from 1200 feet to the surface aquifer, and as such there is a potential leak path. If the casing were to leak due to corrosion or other reason, there would be a leak path from deep salty formations into the aquifer. In addition the aquifer is only protected by one layer of (uncemented) casing.

Information from the US Groundwater Protection Council shows that there is a failure rate of around 1 every 3500 wells, or 0.03%.

=== Use of radioactive sources ===
There has been concern from anti-fracking activists about use of radioactive sources in wells. The difference between radiation dose and Radioactive contamination seems to be poorly understood. Well logs involving radioactive sources are a legal requirement.

== Political issues ==
Shale gas development has brought with it various challenges for Britain's political parties. That is particularly the case for the Conservative Party, where there are tensions between the aspirations of the leadership – who tend to view shale gas in terms of economic benefit, energy independence, and a means of reducing carbon emissions – and the priorities of many of its supporters who are hostile to the process, especially those who live in areas likely to be explored for shale gas.

The Liberal Democrats, in 2013 in a coalition government with the Conservative government which strongly supported shale gas development, began taking a position downplaying prospects for a "shale gas revolution", issuing several position papers on climate change which minimized the role of shale gas in favour of renewables.

As of 2012, the Labour Party has been more reticent, but MPs have indicated they are receptive to shale gas development if environmental safeguards and an appropriate regulatory regime are in place.

By contrast, UKIP has been enthusiastic about shale gas development, a stance that is partly derived from its hostility to wind farms. The UK Green Party's energy policy EN264 states that: "We will halt the development of coal-bed methane, shale gas and similar hydrocarbon exploitation since it is not needed to meet UK energy demands, is environmentally destructive, and will lead to increasing GHG emissions".

As of 2013, the government was solidly behind development of the fossil fuel shale gas industry and was offering to give shale gas companies favourable tax treatment for the unconventional energy source. Also they stated they would turn 100% of business tax proceeds over to local councils instead of the usual 50% which has been seen as controversial in some parts of the media. Green Party leader Natalie Bennett said of the government's proposal to turn the business taxes gained from shale gas development over to the local councils: "It looks like the government is bribing local councils and it shows how desperate it is to get fracking accepted locally."

In May 2014, the House of Lords report "The Economic Impact on UK Energy Policy of Shale Gas and Oil" from the Economic Affairs Committee was published. It took evidence on a wide variety of subjects from a wide variety of sources. It concludes that shale gas exploration and development should go ahead urgently, and that the regulatory regime was complex, and a hindrance to growth.

In May 2014, the prospect of drilling under people's homes was put out for consultation and the resulting report in October 2014 indicated that 99% of 40,000 responses were opposed to this. The Infrastructure bill, which became law in February 2015, included an amendment that this was to be permitted. The National Farmers Union issued this statement that indicated concerns with property prices, long term environmental issues and payment for access in line with other industries.

IN 2014, the chemical firm Ineo proposed they would pay 6% of income in payments for local people, farmers, and landowners. Ineos chairman Jim Ratcliffe said "Giving 6% of revenues to those living above Britain's shale gas developments means the rewards will be fairly shared by everyone." Friends of the Earth said this was a "transparent attempt to bribe communities"

In February 2022 the Oil & Gas Authority (OGA) ordered the "plugging and abandonment" of Britain's shale wells.

=== Conflicts of interest ===
There have been a number of concerns raised regarding conflicts of interest between policy makers and financial links to shale gas development, notably:

- John Browne, Baron Browne of Madingley of Cuadrilla - The former BP boss is chairman of Cuadrilla, which is exploring for shale gas in Lancashire and West Sussex. He is lead "non-executive" across Government.
- Baroness Hogg - The former lead independent director for HM Treasury sat on the board of BG Group, which, prior to its acquisition by Royal Dutch Shell, had significant shale gas assets in the United States.
- Sam Laidlaw - The non-executive to the Transport Department is also chief executive of British Gas owner Centrica, which bought a 25 per cent stake in Cuadrilla's most promising shale gas prospect.
- Ben Moxham - A former executive at BP when Lord Browne was at the helm, he followed the peer to Riverstone Holdings, which owns 42 per cent of Cuadrilla. Moxham was energy adviser at No 10 but quit in May 2013.
- Lord Howell - George Osborne's father-in-law was also president, from 2004 to 2013, of the British Institute of Energy Economics, whose backers include BP and BG Group.
- Viscount Ridley - The House of Lords Commissioner for Standards found that "Lord Ridley breached the Code of Conduct by not declaring his interests in Weir Group, whose activities include shale gas production, when speaking on the Energy Bill."
- House of Lords Select Committee on Economic Affairs potential conflicts of interest with regards to shale gas development:
- Baron Hollick: Has shares in Samson resources a US company with shale gas investments.
- Lord Skidelsky: invested in Janus Capital who hold stakes in oil and gas firms
- Lord McFall: Held investments in FTI consulting, fracking industry advisers
- Baroness Noakes: had shares in at least 3 firms with interests in shale gas.
- Lord MacGregor or John MacGregor as he was previously known is the current Chairman of 'The British Energy Pension Fund Trustees and chairman, Eggborough Power Ltd Pension Fund Trustees, both now part of EDF Energy.
- CPRE Northumberland's Chairman David Montag-Smith is also chairman of the board of directors of Rathlin Energy Ltd who are exploring Yorkshire for shale gas.

=== Moratoria ===
In July 2014, the Scottish Government issued an Expert Scientific Panel Report on Unconventional Oil & Gas which investigated the technical, and environmental challenges of this technology. After the third reading of the Infrastructure bill in January 2015, Scotland imposed a moratorium, pending another environmental review. This prompted negative comment from the original report authors.

The Welsh Government stated that applications from drilling companies must be referred to ministers from February 2015. "Planning applications for the exploration, appraisal, or extraction of unconventional oil and gas which would utilise unconventional techniques (including hydraulic fracturing) must be referred to the Welsh Ministers, where local planning authorities are minded to approve them"

=== Public opinion ===
Quarterly "Wave" polling, originally commissioned by DECC (now BEIS), has been monitoring public opinion on shale gas with its Energy and Climate Change Public Attitudes Tracker since Wave 8 (December 2013). The eighth wave showed 27% supported "extracting shale gas to generate the UK's heat and electricity", while 21% opposed. As of Wave 20 (December 2016), that position has shifted with 18% supporting extraction of shale gas and 31% opposed.

The University of Nottingham 'Survey of Public Attitudes to Shale Gas Extraction in the UK' has been running since March 2012. This series of polls shows that public support for the extraction and use of shale gas (from those who correctly identified shale gas in the gateway question), has fallen from a peak of 58.3% in July 2013 to just over 37.3% by the twelfth poll in October 2016. In the same time period opposition is shown as having grown from 18.8% to 41.1%. The October 2016 poll was "a milestone" according to its authors as for the first time a majority of respondents were opposed to its development in the UK. Moreover, across the survey there had been an increase in respondents associating shale gas with negative environmental impacts. As concerns about the environmental impacts of shale gas have increased the poll's authors say they have seen the UK public become less convinced of its benefits to the economy and the energy security of the UK.

A survey by YouGov for Friends of the Earth, published in August 2016, found that 33% of people would support fracking in their local area if individual households received a payment of up to £10,000. According to the research, 43% said they would oppose fracking despite the payment and 25% said they didn't know.

July 2016 Polling by ComRes for Remsol showed support for shale gas at 26% with opposition at 46%, with shale gas being the least popular energy source when compared to solar, onshore wind, nuclear, biomass and electricity storage.

Both the 2016 YouGov and ComRes polling showed that while men in the UK were evenly divided about fracking, women were strongly against it; DECC/BEIS wave polling has shown that support for renewables has consistently been stronger than support for fracking, with support for on-shore wind having increased from 66% to 71% between Waves 1 and 19.

A January 2014 Guardian poll found that a majority support shale gas extraction, but by a somewhat narrower margin than previously. To the question "Should shale gas extraction be allowed?" 53% said yes (down from 58% in July 2012), and 27% answered no (up from 19% in July 2012).

A poll conducted by Opinium/Observer in August 2013 showed that while men in the UK were evenly divided about fracking taking place in their area, women were strongly against it; the population as a whole preferred renewables such as wind farms.

An ICM poll in August 2013 found that public opinion in the UK was in favour of hydraulic fracturing in general, by 44% in favour to 30% opposed. However, when asked if they favoured hydraulic fracturing in their own area, the public split evenly, 40% in favour to 40% against. Support for fracking was stronger among men, older people, and conservatives.

== See also ==
- Oil & gas reserves and resource quantification
- Unconventional (oil & gas) reservoir
- Hydraulic fracturing in the United Kingdom
- Oil and gas industry in the United Kingdom
