= Fracking in the United Kingdom =

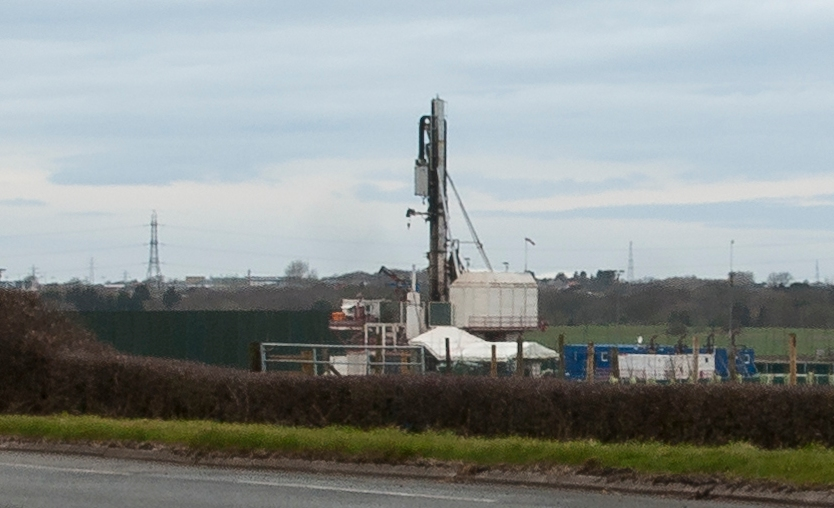
Cuadrilla drilling rig at Preston New Road, 23 March 2018, during the drilling of horizontal well Preston New Road-1Z (credit: Ian Greig)

Fracking is a well-stimulation technique in which rock is fractured by a hydraulically pressurized fluid. It requires a borehole to be drilled to target depth in the reservoir. For oil and gas production, hydraulically fractured wells can be horizontal or vertical, while the reservoir can be conventional or unconventional. After the well has been drilled, lined, and geophysically logged, the rock can be hydraulically fractured.

Fracking in the United Kingdom was claimed to have started in the late 1970s with fracturing of some 200 onshore conventional oil and gas wells. The technique attracted attention after licences were awarded for onshore shale gas exploration in 2008. The 200 wells claim had been made by a joint report in 2012 of experts from the Royal Society and Royal Society of Engineering, but turned out to be misleading, in that small-scale local fracking may have been performed at these wells, for example for wellbore cleaning, but no high volume hydraulic fracking (HVHF) had been used, with the exception of the Preese Hall-1 well drilled by Cuadrilla in Lancashire in 2011. The definition of HVHF is discussed below.

The topic received considerable public debate on environmental grounds, with a 2019 high court ruling ultimately banning the process. Only two horizontal wells were ever fracked using HVHF. The operator, Cuadrilla, was supposed to have started plugging and decommissioning these wells in 2022, but in spring 2025 it had not even started.

== Definitions of fracking in the UK context ==
Hydrocarbons are formed in a source rock. They can migrate over geological time to collect in a reservoir rock, from which they may be accessed by conventional drilling and production methods. But the physical properties of a source rock can be altered by so-called unconventional methods, such that the source rock volume becomes the reservoir. Such alteration belongs to the category of well stimulation methods. Well stimulation can apply to geothermal as well as to hydrocarbon resources.

Comparison of various well stimulation methods, which form part of the completion stage in the life cycle of a well

Hydraulic fracturing (fracking) and acidising are two of the most common methods for well stimulation. The flow chart shows that hydraulic fracking and acid fracking are two categories of unconventional hydraulic methods. But acidising is complicated by the fact that matrix acidising is considered conventional. Note that it takes place below the fracture gradient of the rock.

In the UK legislative and hydrocarbon permitting context, Adriana Zalucka et al. (in a peer-reviewed article from 2021) have reviewed the various definitions, as well as the role of key regulators and authorities, in particular the Oil and Gas Authority (OGA), the Environment Agency (EA), the Health and Safety Executive (HSE) and planning authorities.

They point out that the EA uses terms like 'acid squeeze', which is rarely used by the hydrocarbon industry, and is in any case ambiguous. The definition of HVHF in the Petroleum Act of 1998 is poorly drafted, and uses an excessively large water volume use criterion. 'Associated Hydraulic Fracturing' in the 1998 Act was superseded by 'Relevant Hydraulic Fracturing' in 2016, so that there are now two conflicting legal definitions of what is meant by HVHF. Acid fracking, an important method in the onshore UK context, was not mentioned.

Only three shale wells have been fracked to date in the UK. The authors show that it is possible that none of them would have met the definition of ‘Associated’ hydraulic fracturing, and only Preese Hall-1 (a vertical test well) met the definition of ‘relevant’ hydraulic fracturing. The remaining two wells, Preston New Road-1z and Preston New Road-2, were horizontal wells.

Zalucka et al. conclude that the UK legislation concerning the legal definitions was, and remains, confusing, ambiguous, incomplete, self-contradictory, and full of legal loopholes. To solve this problem they have proposed a new robust definition for unconventional well treatments:

All well stimulation treatments of oil and gas wells which increase the permeability of the target rock volume to higher than 0.1 millidarcies beyond a 1 m radius from the borehole.

The above definition focuses on increasing permeability, rather than on any particular extraction process. It is quantitative, using the generally agreed 0.1 md cut-off value, below which rocks are considered impermeable. It exempts borehole cleaning processes like acid squeeze or acid wash from being classed as unconventional, by using the 1 m radius criterion. It avoids a definition based on, for example, the quantity of water injected, which is controversial, or the injection pressure applied (whether the treatment is above or below the fracture gradient, as shown in the flow chart above). It also exempts non-hydrocarbon wells from being classed as unconventional.

== History ==
=== Offshore UK ===
Experiments on fracking for hydrocarbons began onshore in the US in 1947.

In the UK, the first fracking of an oil well was carried out offshore, shortly after discovery of the West Sole field in the Southern North Sea in 1965. After the industry started to use intermediate and high-strength proppants in the late 1970s, fracking became a common technique in the North Sea oil and gas wells. Fracking from a ship was first conducted in 1980, with HVHF used from 1984 onwards. The target rocks are predominantly tight gas sandstones of Permian and Carboniferous age, and not the thick shales which are the target of most HVHF treatments.

=== Onshore UK ===
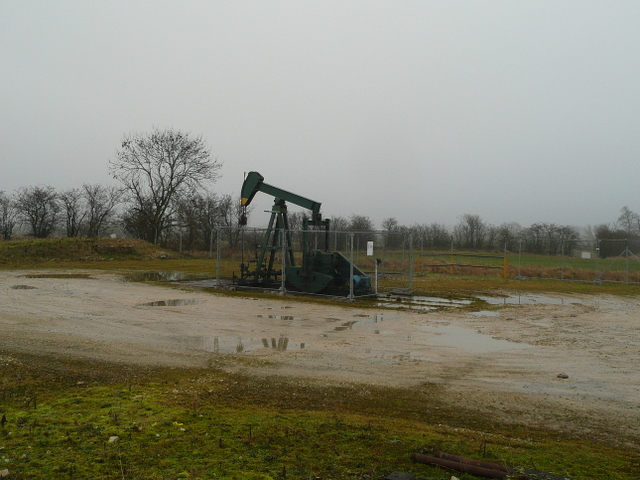
Oil well in Lincolnshire. Around 200 onshore wells such as this have been fracked, but only using localised low-volume fracking, which has little in common with high-volume hydraulic fracturing.

An estimated 200 conventional onshore wells have been subject to low volume hydraulic fracturing; around 10% of all onshore wells in the United Kingdom, including Wytch Farm, which is the largest onshore conventional oil field in western Europe.

From 1977 until 1994, a hot dry rock geothermal energy experiment was conducted in the Carnmenellis granite of Cornwall. During that experiment, three geothermal wells with depth of 2.6 kilometres (1.6 mi) were hydraulically fractured "to research the hydraulic stimulation of fracture networks at temperatures below 100 °C (212 °F)".

The surge of public interest in high-volume hydraulic fracturing in the UK can be traced to 2008, when Cuadrilla Resources was granted a petroleum exploration and development licence in the 13th onshore licensing round for unconventional shale gas exploration along the coast of Lancashire. The company's first HVHF job was performed on its Preese Hall-1 wellbore in March 2011, near Blackpool, Lancashire. Cuadrilla halted operations due to seismic activity damaging the casing in the production zone. On 2 November 2019, the UK government imposed a moratorium on fracking in England. Scotland and Wales have moratoria in place against hydraulic fracturing.

Only HVHF combined with horizontal drilling was ever considered likely to enable commercial extraction of unconventional hydrocarbon resources, such as shale gas and light tight oil, in the United Kingdom. The areas where hydraulic fracturing was anticipated to be used included the Upper Bowland Shale of the Pennine Basin in Lancashire and Yorkshire, and the Jurassic oil-bearing shales of the Weald Basin in Hampshire, Surrey, Sussex and Kent.

The national parks with geology of possible interest included the North York Moors (shales), the Peak District (shales and coals), the South Downs (shale oil) and to the south of the Yorkshire Dales (shales and coals).

The subsequent report of 2012 by experts from the Royal Society and the Royal Academy of Engineering concluded that earthquake risk was minimal, and recommended the process be given nationwide clearance. However, it highlighted certain concerns which led to changes in regulations.

In January 2014, the European Commission issued a set of recommendations on the minimum principles for the exploration and production of hydrocarbons from shale formations using high-volume hydraulic fracturing.

A 2016 government report on the UK shale gas sector was finally made available in 2019 after a three-year legal battle to make it public, but with three-quarters of its pages blacked out. The unredacted paragraphs said that the government was "undertaking crucial work on communications to increase public acceptability of shale." In March 2019, the High Court found the UK government's policy was unlawful and failed to consider the climate impact of shale gas extraction.

In November 2019 the government announced "an indefinite suspension" to fracking, after a report by the Oil and Gas Authority (OGA) said it was not possible to predict the probability or size of tremors caused by the practice. Business Secretary Andrea Leadsom said that the suspension might be temporary - imposed "until and unless" extraction is proved safe. As of February 2022, the two Cuadrilla wells in Lancashire, which had been out of operation since the ban, were supposed to finally be plugged and decommissioned.

The Eden Project in Cornwall began drilling and fracking two geothermal wells in 2021 as a source for a geothermal power station. heating of the artificial biomes using geothermal hot water at 85 °C began in 2023.

By mid March and 4 weeks into the 2022 Russian invasion of Ukraine the CEO of Cuadrilla asked the government to keep the wells open for energy security.

On 8 June 2026, Lancashire County Council officially served an enforcement notice, ordering Cuadrilla to completely restore its Preston New Road fracking site, near Blackpool, to farmland, by the end of the year.

== Regulation ==
Several government agencies, departments and one government company are involved in the regulation of hydraulic fracturing in the United Kingdom: the North Sea Transition Authority (NSTA), the Department for Energy Security and Net Zero (DESNZ), the local council planning authority including the Minerals Planning Authority (MPA), the Health and Safety Executive (HSE) and one of four environment agencies These environmental agencies are: the Environment Agency for England; Natural Resources Wales; the Scottish Environment Protection Agency (SEPA) for Scotland, and; the Northern Ireland Environment Agency (NIEA) for Northern Ireland.

=== Licences and permits ===
Before onshore hydraulic fracturing can begin, an operator will have obtained a landward licence, known as a Petroleum Exploration and Development Licence (PEDL), from the OGA.

A series of steps are then taken to obtain permissions from the landowner and council planning authorities. The operator then requests a permit from the Minerals Planning Authority (MPA), who together with the local planning authority, determine if an environmental impact assessment (EIA), funded by the operator, is required.

Up to six permits, constituting the Environmental Permitting Regulations (EPR) 2010, two permits "under the Water Resources Act 1991" and one permit "under the Control of Major Accident Hazards Regulations 2015" are obtained from the appropriate environmental agency, to ensure that onshore hydraulic fracturing operators fulfil strict environmental regulations.

The role of the Health and Safety Executive (HSE) is to focus on the design and integrity of the well, using an independent expert known as the 'well examiner'. The EA and HSE together will "inspect the next series of hydraulic fracturing operations in England and Wales."

A hydraulic fracture plan (HFP) is required for both conventional hydraulic fracture well stimulation and unconventional high volume hydraulic well stimulation. The HFP is agreed with OGA in consultation with the EA and HSE. Hydraulic fracturing consent (HFC) is granted following an application to BEIS, to be reviewed by the Secretary of State, and; comply with requirements to mitigate any seismic risks.

In October 2022, British Prime Minister Rishi Sunak reinstated England's fracking ban moratorium after it was briefly lifted by his predecessor Liz Truss.

=== Permitted chemicals ===
The UK's four environment agencies do not permit chemical additives for hydraulic fracturing fluids that are classed as hazardous to groundwater, as defined by Schedule 22 of Environmental Permitting (England and Wales) Regulations 2010 (EPR 2010), Schedule 5 of the Pollution Prevention and Control (Scotland) Regulations 2012, and the EU Groundwater Directive (80/68/EEC). The environmental regulator will assess every chemical before it is added to the hydraulic fracturing fluid. The nature of each chemical, but not the concentration, must be made available to the public.

The Joint Agencies Groundwater Directive Advisory Group (JAGDAG) maintains a list of substances that have been assessed as being hazardous substances or non-hazardous pollutants for the groundwater directive. Input of hazardous substances "on the basis of their toxicity, persistence and capacity to bio-accumulate" is not permitted into potable or unpotable groundwater. Substances which are not hazardous are potentially non-hazardous pollutants.

At the Balcombe site, the Environment Agency permitted one requested chemical oxirane, while not permitting the use of antimony trioxide, which "would be hazardous if it came into contact with groundwater".

=== Fracture fluids ===
Chemical additives, typically around 1 per cent of the total fluid volume, are added to water to reduce water viscosity and modify fluid properties. The fracking fluid used at Preese Hall-1 in Weeton, Lancashire, was "99.95% water and sand". The chemical additives (0.05 per cent) were:

- Polyacrylamide emulsion in hydrocarbon oil (0.043 per cent), which reduces the viscosity of the water to allow faster pumping. It is classed as a "non-hazardous pollutant"
- Sodium salt, for tracing fracturing fluid (0.000005 per cent)

Proppants may comprise up to 10 per cent of hydraulic fracturing fluid volume. The proppants used at Preese Hall-1 were silica sand:

- Congleton Sand (0.473 per cent)
- Chelford Sand (1.550 per cent)

Additional chemical additives that were permitted at Preese Hall-1, but not used, were highly dilute hydrochloric acid and glutaraldehyde, which is used as a biocide in very small quantities, to sterilise the water. Ultraviolet germicidal irradiation is another replacement available for water sterilisation. Although some of the chemicals used in hydraulic fracturing fluids such as hydrochloric acid may be classified as toxic, corrosive or irritant, they are non-toxic at lower concentrations.

==== Flowback fluid ====
Flowback fluid contains high levels of salt and is contaminated with organic "solids, heavy metals, fracking chemicals and naturally occurring radioactive material (NORM) of varying concentration and low levels of radioactive materials". The Environment Agency strategy for management of NORM-contaminated flowback fluid, after treatment, includes its preferred re-use by re-injection during hydraulic fracturing and its disposal, with caveats, via water treatment sites.

Flowback fluid can be treated and reused in later hydraulic fracturing operations, to reduce the volume of freshwater required and to mitigate issues arising from off-site disposal of flowback fluid. Flowback fluid injection in deep disposal wells, which has been linked to significant increase in earthquake rate, is not currently permitted in the UK by the Environment Agency.

Research by Engelder et alia in 2012, indicated that any water injected into a shale formation that does not flow back to the surface, known as "residual treatment water", would be permanently absorbed, (sequestered) into the shale.

In January 2014, "applications for permits to frack" were withdrawn by Cuadrilla after arrangements for treatment and disposal of NORM-contaminated flowback fluid were considered inadequate by the Environment Agency. Technologies are developing methods of removing salt and radioactive materials, allowing safe disposal of flowback fluid under Environment Agency licence. Research in the US also indicates new methods such as "microbial capacitive desalination cells" may become available.

In March 2025 planners gave support to the proposal by Angus Energy to inject 'produced water' (flowback fluid) from other sites into a second producing conventional oil well at Brockham, but the proposal has been challenged. One ground of the objection is that the waste water is inadequately defined.

=== Criticism ===
In March 2014, a group of conservation charities including the RSPB and the National Trust released a report containing a 10-point plan for increased regulation, highlighting their concerns about hydraulic fracturing with respect to groundwater pollution, public water supply, wastewater management and treatment both generally and within ecologically sensitive areas including National Parks. UKOOG, the representative body for the UK onshore oil and gas industry, pointed to "a number of critical inaccuracies" and stated that: "many of the recommendations are already in place in the UK or are in the process of being put in place" and welcomed future dialogue with conservation agencies.

In July 2014, the Chartered Institute of Environmental Health (CIEH) and Scientists for Global Responsibility (SGR) published a report about hydraulic fracturing that was broadly negative. It referred to major shortcomings in regulatory oversight regarding local environmental and public health risks, the potential for undermining efforts to tackle climate change, and the possibility that the process might cause water shortages. The report received a negative review from an academic based upon the lead author being a Green Party candidate, and hydraulic fracturing protester, and the alleged selective nature of some of the data used.

In March 2015, the shale company funded Task Force on Shale Gas criticised "current regulation" as "complex and relatively unapproachable", and responsible for the public's lack of confidence. The Task Force on Shale Gas recommended that the regulatory requirement for an operator-funded independent well examiner to be passed to a single, new government regulator, who would also "independently monitor fracking sites". UKOOG, the industry's trade and advocacy group, said: "public confidence in the industry is vital". The government responded: "Both the Health and Safety Executive and the Environment Agency have full authority and responsibility to monitor all shale sites - independent of the industry,"

In June 2015, the UK regulations for hydraulic fracturing were criticised by the chemicals policy charity, CHEM Trust, stating they were not sufficiently protective, and raising concerns about the reductions in funding for the regulators of fracking, like the Environment Agency. UKOOG, responded to the CHEM Trust analysis, criticised the timing of the report: "The timing of this report is clearly designed to influence local councillors" and stated that "The report includes a number of recommendations that are already part of industry common practice or regulation in the UK." and CHEM Trust responded.

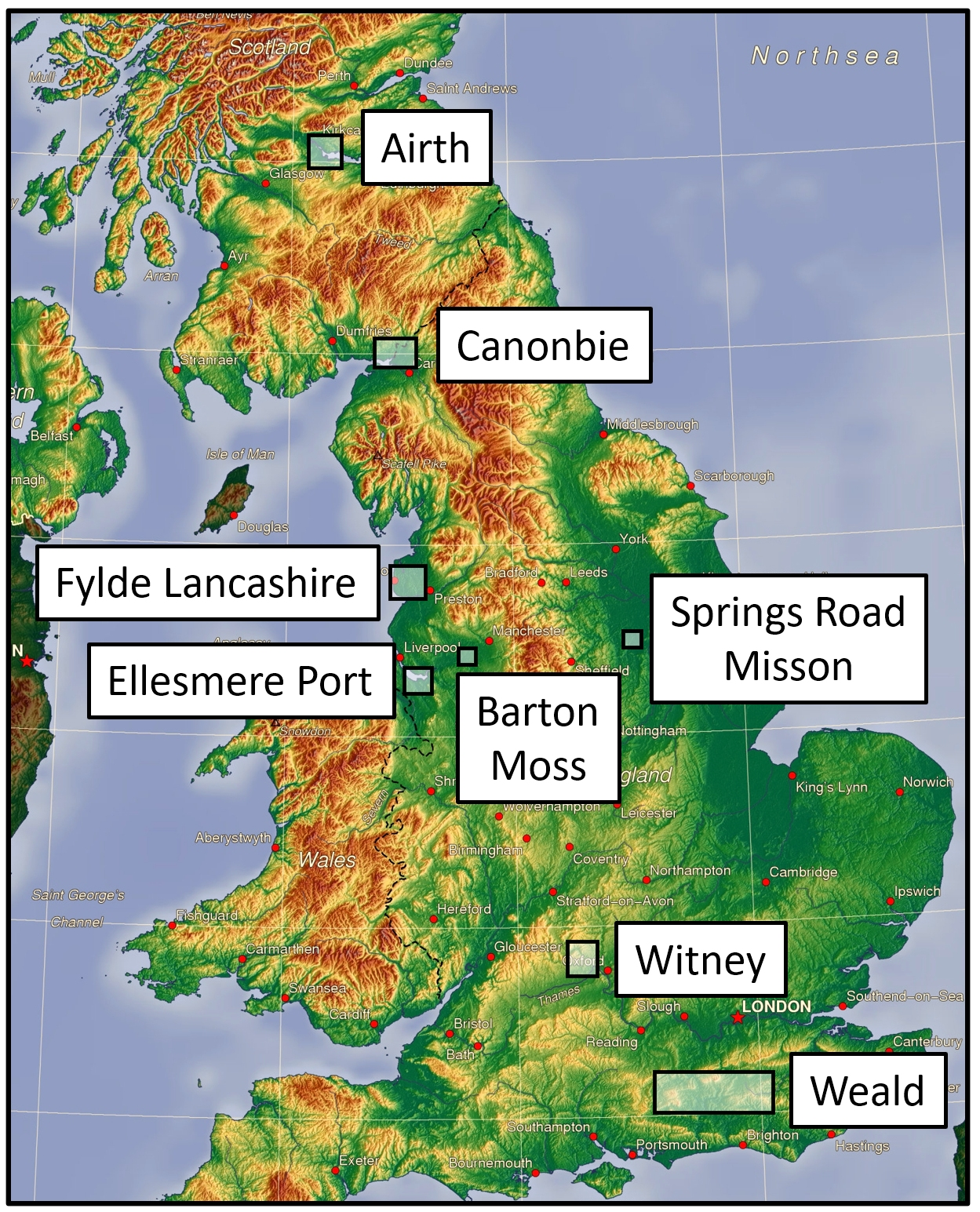
Areas in the UK where the geological aspects of regulation of fracking have been examined by David Smythe

Professor David Smythe criticised the geological aspects of the UK regulations in a Tedx talk in November 2017, followed up in July 2020 by a long peer-reviewed article discussing 14 case histories. He claimed, using 14 case studies, that there is a failure of regulation; inadequate geological comprehension and even mendacious geological interpretations by the hydrocarbon operators slip through the regulatory net. He concluded that: "The case histories demonstrate a laissez-faire and frequently incompetent regulatory regime, devised for the pre-unconventional era, and which has no geological oversight or insight."

== Legislation ==
=== Community and public engagement ===
Community and public engagement is a legal requirement of the EU Directive 2003/35/EC.

In June 2013, the industry body UKOOG issued their Shale Community Engagement Charter. The shale gas industry has agreed to two types of community benefit for communities hosting shale gas development, including: a one-off payment of £100,000 per site, after hydraulic fracturing had taken place, and; a 1% share of production revenues; yearly operator commitment publications.

In 2014, the government announced its intent to create of a Shale Wealth Fund. The fund was originally intended to be controlled by "community trusts or councils". A consultation period solicited views from stakeholders, "individuals, organisations, such as charities; businesses; local authorities, and; community groups"; ran between August and October 2016.

In March 2016, Stephenson Halliday for the Planning Advisory Service noted that the UKOOG local community benefits scheme "fails all three of the tests" in Regulation 122(2) of the Community Infrastructure Levy Regulations 2010. In 2016, the chemical company INEOS committed to a "share 6% of revenues. 4% of this would go to homeowners and landowners in the immediate vicinity of a well, and a further 2% to the wider community." In terms of total revenue, Ineos have estimated that "a typical 10 km by 10 km development area would generate £375m for the community over its lifespan".

=== Infrastructure Act 2015 Sections 43 and 50 ===
The Infrastructure Act 2015 legislated onshore access for onshore and offshore extraction of shale/tight oil, shale gas and deep geothermal energy. Section 50 of the act defined the hydraulic fracturing of "shale strata", also known as "high-volume hydraulic fracturing" as "more than 1000m_{3} of fluid per stage, and; more than 10,000m_{3} in total" and attached conditions that mean no hydraulic fracturing can take place at a depth shallower than 1000m in unprotected areas.

In order for the Secretary of State to give consent to hydraulic fracturing, legislation includes a range of conditions that operators must comply with, such as: "environmental impacts of development", including soil and air monitoring; 12 months of groundwater methane level monitoring prior to "associated" (high-volume) hydraulic fracturing; no associated hydraulic fracturing "within protected groundwater source areas";

=== Onshore Hydraulic Fracturing (Protected Areas) Regulations 2016 ===
"The Onshore Hydraulic Fracturing (Protected Areas) Regulations 2016" prohibited "hydraulic fracturing in protected areas" - i.e. National Parks of England and Wales, Areas of Outstanding Natural Beauty, the Norfolk and Suffolk Broads, and UNESCO World Heritage sites - at depths of less than 1200m.

== Environmental impact ==
The environmental risks of hydraulic fracturing in conventional and unconventional wells are ground and surface water contamination, water resource depletion, releases to air, traffic, land take, noise, visual impact and seismicity, which are typically addressed in environmental impact assessments for fracking activities.

The causation of earthquakes with any significant impact or fractures reaching and contaminating drinking water, were "very low risk" if adequate regulations are in place.

A report from AMEC in December 2013 covers many of the environmental issues that would arise were the shale gas industry to become highly developed.

The British Geological Survey is involved with environmental monitoring.

In October 2014, EASAC stated that: "Overall, in Europe more than 1000 horizontal wells and several thousand hydraulic fracturing jobs have been executed in recent decades. None of these operations are known to have resulted in safety or environmental problems".

In October 2016, Amec Foster Wheeler Infrastructure Ltd (AFWI) compared the environmental impacts and risks of unconventional high volume hydraulic fracturing with conventional low volume hydraulic fracturing. The study found that volume of fluid injected and flowback were the only significant differences between conventional low volume and unconventional high volume hydraulic fracturing and that the impacts and risks for high volume hydraulic fracturing scaled up for land take, traffic, surface water contamination and water resource depletion.

=== Air ===
In February 2016, a study by the ReFINE consortium funded by the Natural Environment Research Council (NERC), Shell, Chevron, Ineos and Centrica, found "substantial increases over the baseline""in local air quality pollutants", during the short-duration high-traffic phase which includes the delivery of hydraulic fracturing equipment, proppant, water, as well as the removal of flowback from the site. According to ReFiNE, these short-duration increases have the potential to breach local air quality standards. The industry group UKOOG criticised the ReFiNE study for failing to take into account that water for hydraulic fracturing fluid might be brought in by pipeline, instead of being transported by truck.

In October 2016, Amec Foster Wheeler Infrastructure Ltd stated that the overall environmental impacts from low volume hydraulic fracturing to local air quality and global warming are low. Local air quality is impacted by dust and SO2 and NOx emissions "from equipment and vehicles used to transport, pressurise and injection fracturing fluids, and process flowback", while "Emissions of CO_{2} from the equipment used to pressurise and injection fracturing fluids, and process flowback." contributes to global warming.

=== Water ===
The RAE report stated, "Many claims of contaminated water wells due to shale gas extraction have been made. None has shown evidence of chemicals found in hydraulic fracturing fluids". The Environment Agency definitions of groundwater and aquifer are here.

In January 2015, the British Geological Survey released national baseline methane levels, which showed a wide range of readings Poor surface well sealing, which allows methane to leak, methane was identified in the Royal Academy of Engineering report as a risk to groundwater. This was incorporated into the Infrastructure Act 2015 with a requirement that monitoring takes place 12 months before fracturing.

The Chartered Institution of Water and Environmental Management (CIWEM) have been involved with evaluating the potential water impacts of hydraulic fracturing.

==== Groundwater contamination ====
Both low and high volume hydraulic fracturing "involve storing and injecting large quantities of chemicals". Any surface spill therefore has "the potential to penetrate groundwater". The likelihood of low volume and high volume hydraulic fracturing contaminating groundwater by surface spills of stored chemicals is rare, however the risk and consequences are moderate. To mitigate the risk, the Environment Agency requires chemical and fluid proof well pads. The 2012 joint Royal Society and Royal Academy of Engineering report indicated that the distances between potable water supplies and fractured formation in various US shale plays is large, meaning the risk of contamination is very small. No cases of pollution by this route have been identified.

Another 2013 paper from ReFine indicated the potential for surface gas leaks from abandoned wells

==== Water use ====
Water use is regulated by the EA (England), the SEPA (Scotland), the NIEA (Northern Ireland) and NRW (Wales) to ensure environmental needs are not compromised. Water companies assess how much water is available, before providing it to operators. The amount of water abstracted nationally is at around 9.4 billion cubic metres. In 2015, the EA indicated that water usage at a peak level would be 0.1% of national use and hydraulic fracturing may use up to "30 million litres per well". Drier areas, such as south-east England, are concerned about the impact of hydraulic fracturing on water supplies.

=== Seismicity ===
==== Microseismic monitoring ====
The hydraulic fracturing process creates a large number of microseismic events, which require monitoring. Microseismic monitoring techniques, using geophones and tilt meters can monitor the growth of fractures in the target formation in real time. This can be done using a surface array, or, if there is a nearby offset well, using downhole geophones. This means that the engineers can modify the pump rate based upon the growth of the fractures, and stop pumping if there is evidence of vertical migration into faults. This technology is available from many big oilfield service companies.

In December 2015, the Centre for Research into Earth Energy Systems (CeREES) at Durham University published the first research of its kind, prior to "planned shale gas and oil exploitation", in order to establish a baseline for anthropogenic, induced seismic events in the UK.

==== Cuadrilla, Lancashire ====
In May 2011, the government suspended Cuadrilla's hydraulic fracturing operations in their Preese Hall-1 well in Lancashire, after two small earthquakes were triggered, one of magnitude M 2.3. The largest coseismic slip caused minor deformation of the wellbore and was strong enough to be felt.

The company halted operations to await DECC guidance on the conclusions of a study being carried out by the British Geological Survey and Keele University, which concluded in April 2012 that the process posed a seismic risk, but minimal enough to allow it to proceed with stricter monitoring. Cuadrilla pointed out that a number of such small-magnitude earthquakes occur naturally each month in Britain.

Cuadrilla commissioned an investigation into the seismic activity, which concluded that the tremors were probably caused by the lubrication of an existing fault plane by the unintended spread of hydraulic fracturing fluid below ground.

In 2012, a report on hydraulic fracturing produced jointly by the Royal Society and the Royal Academy of Engineering noted that earthquakes of magnitude M 3.0, which are more intense than the larger of the two quakes caused by Cuadrilla are: "Felt by few people at rest or in the upper floors of buildings; similar to the passing of a truck." The British Geological Survey has published information on seismic issues relating to hydraulic fracturing.

In February 2014, following the small seismic event in the Preese Hall 1 well, and much research, the DECC issued a statement on earthquake risk.

Up to August 2016, there were two cases in the UK of fault reactivation by hydraulic fracturing that caused induced seismicity strong enough to be felt by humans at the surface: both in Lancashire (M 2.3 and M 1.5).

In October 2018, more earthquakes were recorded in Lancashire, including two tremors of 0.8 magnitude which obliged Cuadrilla to call a temporary halt on the drilling operations.

In 2019 a peer-reviewed paper was published under the joint authorship of Cuadrilla and Bristol University authors. It described how detailed microseismic monitoring, such as at Preston New Road, could help an operator to assess the seismic risk, and thus make proactive decisions to the mitigate induced seismicity in real time. But the proactive mitigation failed, because in August 2019, after a series of minor tremors and pauses in fracking under the traffic light system, a local magnitude 2.9 earthquake was triggered, and Cuadrilla was obliged to suspend its fracking.

==== Subsidence ====
There is no documented evidence of hydraulic fracturing leading to subsidence. Operations are commonly monitored with tiltmeters, and no compaction issues have been documented. Given the mechanical properties of unconventional rocks (their densities, low porosities, low Biot coefficients, and high stiffness), compaction is very unlikely to occur during hydrocarbon extraction.

==== Insurance ====
In an answer to questions from the 'Lets talk about Shale' initiative, run by Westbourne Communications for the industry body, UKOOG, they have stated "According to the Association of British Insurers there is, at present, little evidence of a link between shale gas and property damage, and they are not aware of any claims where seismic activity as a result of fracking has been cited as a cause of damage. Damage as a result of earthquakes, subsidence, heave and landslip are all covered, in general, under buildings insurance. Insurers will continue to monitor the situation for the potential for fracking, or similar explorations, to cause damage."

It was reported in early 2015 that farms would not be covered by issues that may arise due to hydraulic fracturing. A clarification by the insurer indicated that this would only apply to a farmer that permitted this on their land. Surrounding farms would be covered.

In March 2017, the Chartered Insurance Institute (CII) released a report by the CII Claims Faculty New Generation Group, which explored the Insurance implications of fracking. The authors examined the "key perils associated with fracking such as earthquakes, explosions and fire, pollution, injury and death", and found that while "most insurances policies" provided "cover for these risks", "fracking will pose additional complications around liability". The authors also considered that if widespread fracking were to lead to increased claims, "then insurers may have to consider how they underwrite this emerging higher-risk group". The authors recommended: working together within the insurance profession "to monitor and discuss the issues" while remaining "open and transparent about the risks of fracking", and; working with the "energy industry and the government" "to reduce the likelihood of potential risks occurring". The CII emphasised that "insurers need to be prepared for claims in the event of a fracking-related loss and consider policy wordings with increased fracking in mind".

=== Public health ===
If the Minerals Planning Authority determine that public health will be significantly impacted, the Director of Public health is consulted so that a "health impact assessment" can be prepared. The Environment Agency then uses the health impact assessment when considering the "potential health effects" during their "permit determination"

In 2014, Public Health England reviewed the "available evidence on issues including air quality, radon gas, naturally occurring radioactive materials, water contamination and waste water. They concluded that the risks to public health from exposure to emissions from shale gas extraction are low if operations are properly run and regulated." Public Health England's Dr John Harrison, Director for Radiation, Chemical and Environmental Hazards, stated that: "Where potential risks have been identified in other countries, the reported problems are typically due to operational failure. Good on-site management and appropriate regulation of all aspects of exploratory drilling, gas capture as well as the use and storage of hydraulic fracturing fluid is essential to minimise the risks to the environment and health."

In 2015 the health charity Medact published a paper written by two public health specialists called 'Health & Fracking - The impacts and opportunity costs', which reviewed health impacts of hydraulic fracturing and suggested a moratorium until a more detailed health and environmental impact assessment could be completed. UKOOG criticised Medact's understanding of UK regulations and said they had not declared that one of its consultants, who was standing for parliament in the 2015 general election, had a conflict of interest. The Times journalist Ben Webster also criticised Medact for not declaring one of their consultant's conflict of interest and reported that the Medact director had not realised that this consultant was also an anti-fracking candidate. MedAct published a response to these criticisms.

The content of the Medact Report 2015 was referred to by many objectors in the June 2015 Public reports pack for the Lancashire County Council Development Control Committee. Lancashire County Council were uncertain how much weight to attach to the Medact report due to "questions from some quarters" about the objectivity of the report based on association of two its contributors with campaigns relating to shale gas.

In 2016, Medact released an updated public health report, citing health risks from shale gas development and calling upon the government to "abandon its shale gas plans".

== The fracking debate ==
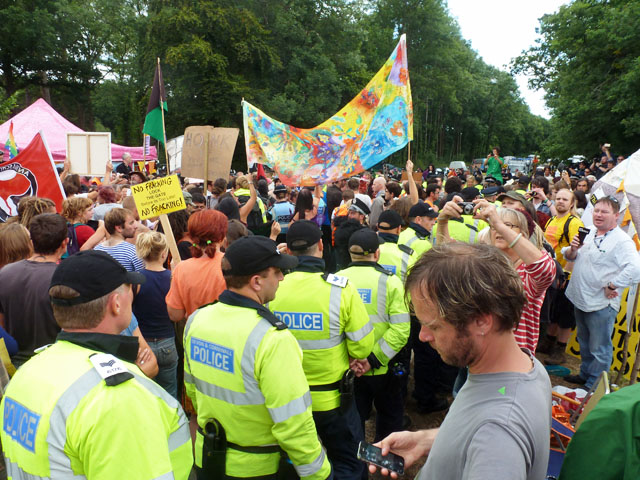
18 August 2013: Fracking protest south of Balcombe, Sussex, England.

Concerns over fracking became an issue for local authorities and communities across the country, including: Sussex, Somerset and Kent, and the Vale of Glamorgan. In 2011, Bath and North East Somerset Council voiced concerns that hydraulic fracturing could contaminate Bath's famous hot springs. and has become part of the Climate Change debate.

Protests were held against onshore fossil fuel exploration that might necessitate fracking. In 2012, industry assurances were tarnished when Cuadrilla came under fire for its categorical denials of its plans for hydraulic fracturing near Balcombe after documents from parent company AJ Lucas materialised appearing to indicate the opposite. In 2014, Cuadrilla scrapped its plans to frack at Balcombe. In May 2014, a letter to the Department of Energy and Climate Change dated June 2011 emerged, confirming the company believed that to achieve commercial production, "significant amounts of hydraulic fracturing" would be required at Balcombe.

=== Opposition to and support for fracking ===
There are a number of anti-fracking groups, which range from the nationwide Frack Off, which was engaged in the Balcombe drilling protest, to local groups such as Residents Action on Fylde Fracking, Ribble Estuary Against Fracking, NO Fracking in Sussex, Frack Free Fernhurst and The Vale Says No! Environmental NGOs Greenpeace, World Wide Fund for Nature (WWF) and Friends of the Earth are also against fracking.

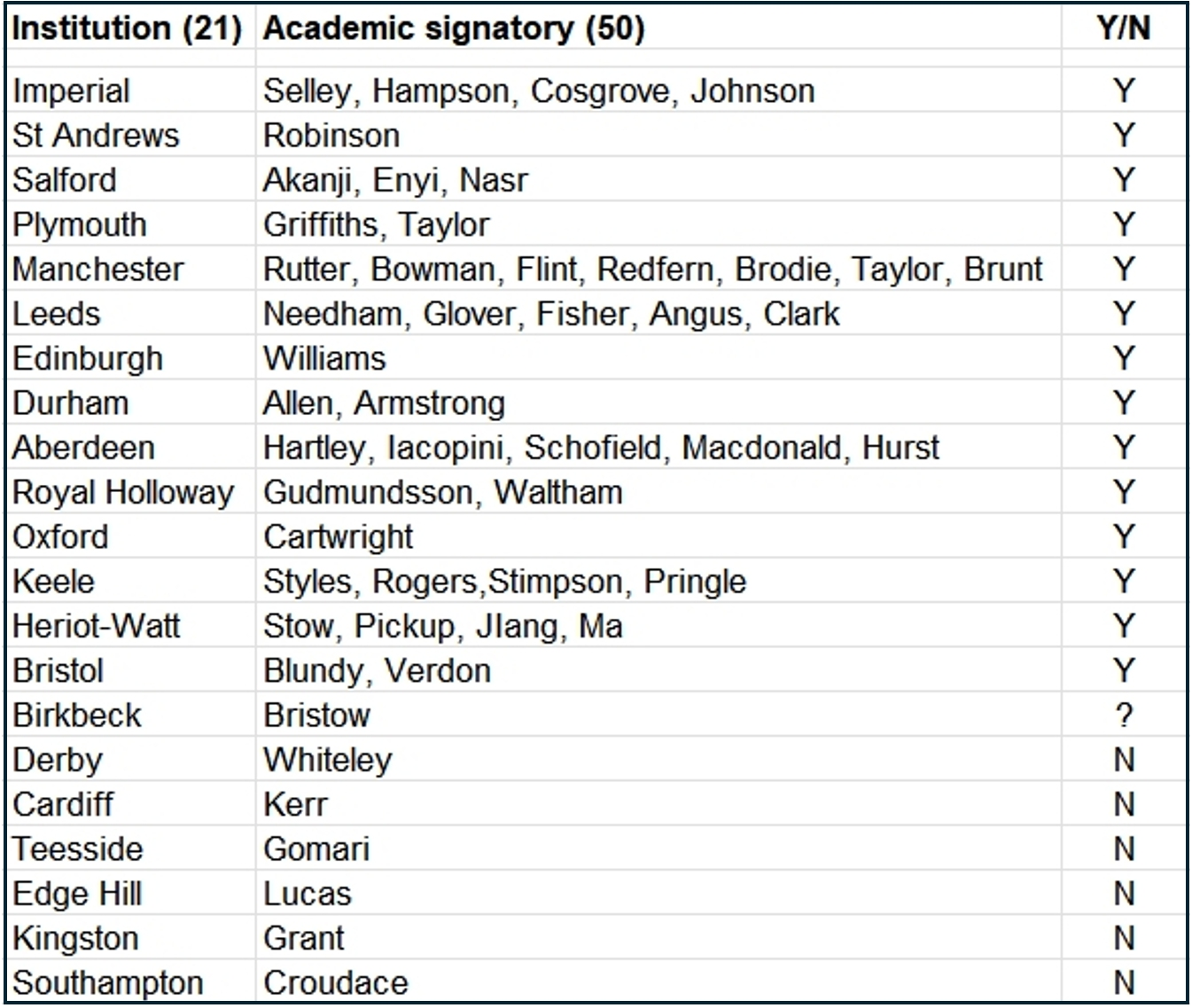
43 of the 50 academics, at 14 out of 21 institutions (Y=Yes in the right-hand column) were in receipt of oil industry funding around the time they signed a letter to The Guardian supporting fracking.

A group of fifty geoscientists and petroleum engineers 'from Britain's leading academic institutions' published a letter in The Guardian in support of UK shale gas in 2014. But 43 of these fifty scientists, based at 14 out of the 21 institutions, received hydrocarbon industry funding.

British businessman Joseph Corré set up a website talkfracking.org, and tried to organise a series of events around the country, but they were reportedly boycotted by industry and pro-fracking politicians. He commissioned researcher Paul Mobbs to produce the six-part report "Frackademics", mapping the connections between the fossil fuel industry, academic researchers, and government. His case study number 5 analysed the origin of the Guardian letter above, concluding that it was a PR smokescreen, and an example of astroturfing.

Anti-fracking campaigners say that there are various problems associated with the process including pressure on local transport infrastructure, air and water pollution, the amounts of water used, and potential economic damage to agricultural, food production and tourism industries.

Pro-fracking campaigners such as the Centrica-backed group North West Energy Task Force say the "fracking industry" "could bring a boost to jobs and the economy" and that "shale gas has a pivotal role to play in the region's future success" and "would act as a catalyst to bring the vital investment necessary to secure existing industries and develop new ones." In 2014, Business and Energy Minister Michael Fallon said that the opportunity to release up to 4.4 billion barrels of oil by fracking in the Wealden basin, covering Hampshire, Surrey, Sussex and Kent, "will bring jobs and business opportunities" and significantly help with UK energy self-sufficiency.

In 2019, a government survey showed that public opposition to fracking had risen to its highest level so far, and support dropped to a record low. Those opposed to fracking constituted 40 per cent of participants, up from 35 per cent in December 2018, and up from 21 per cent in 2013. Opposition to fracking was highest in north-west England (50 per cent), Wales (49 per cent) and Scotland (49 per cent). It was lowest in London (30 per cent), east England (31 per cent) and the west midlands (32 per cent). Support for fracking fell to 12 per cent of participants, down slightly on 13 per cent in the previous survey. This was the lowest level recorded by the survey so far, and 17 percentage points below the peak in March 2014. Strong support for fracking remained unchanged at two per cent.

In 2024 Europa Oil & Gas applied to drill and carry out a 'small-scale' fracking job, also referred to as a 'proppant squeeze', at Burniston, North Yorkshire. The ongoing controversy about whether or not this constitutes fracking illustrates that the old, volume-based, definition of fracking, still used by the government, is inadequate for the task [see the section above on 'Definitions of fracking in the UK context'].

=== Advertising Standards Authority complaints ===
Anti-fracking and pro-fracking campaigners have submitted a series of complaints about advertisements, brochures and leaflets to the Advertising Standards Agency.

In April 2013, "fracking activist" Refracktion reported Cuadrilla's brochure to the Advertising Standards Authority (ASA), who deemed that of the 18 statements made, 11 were acceptable and six had breached the Committee of Advertising Practice (CAP) code, and that the brochure "must not appear again in its present form". In January 2015 Reverend Michael Roberts and Ken Wilkinson reported an anti-fracking group's leaflet to the ASA. The ASA resolved the complaint with an informal ruling that the group, Residents Action On Fylde Fracking (RAFF), had "exaggerated the size and scale of planned fracking operations". RAFF "agreed to amend or withdraw advertising without the need for a formal investigation". In 2015, Cuadrilla and Reverend Michael Roberts reported a leaflet produced by Friends of the Earth to the ASA and the Fundraising Standards Board (FRSB), now known as the Fundraising Regulator. Friends of the Earth gave assurance to the ASA that they would not repeat claims in their advertisements about "the effects of fracking on the health of local populations, drinking water or property prices" "in the absence of adequate evidence". The ASA clarified their position, after it became evident that FoE rejected the results of their investigation.

=== Wales ===
In October 2011 the campaign to prohibit Coastal Oil and Gas from test drilling at the Llandow Industrial Estate, in the Vale of Glamorgan, met with initial success after local councillors unanimously refused the company's plans, though Coastal immediately indicated it would appeal. Residents feared that successful exploration would be the prelude for hydraulic fracturing. The basis of the council's decision was a letter from Welsh Water stating that there was "a very small risk" of contamination of its reserve groundwater sites from exploratory drilling. The rejection came despite the Council being told that, strictly from a planning point of view, there were no "reasonable or sustainable grounds" to refuse, and despite the drilling application containing no explicit mention of hydraulic fracturing. The company had additionally claimed that, since the "gas shales in the Vale are not as thick as elsewhere", any discoveries would be "very unlikely" to require hydraulic fracturing for extraction.

Coastal Oil and Gas decided to appeal to the Welsh Government, rather than undertake legal action against the local authority, and a public enquiry began in May 2012. Coastal's chances of success at the enquiry were boosted by Kent County Council approval of the company's near-identical plans for preliminary drilling in Woodnesborough, and were increased to near certainty after Welsh Water effectively retracted its previous risk assessment.

=== Industry response ===
In arguing its case, Cuadrilla contrasts its approach with the one taken in the United States, claiming that only three chemicals—a polyacrylamide lubricant commonly found in cosmetics, hydrochloric acid, and a biocide used to purify drinking water—will be used in the UK, compared with the hundreds that can be used across the Atlantic; that it has invested in more expensive, better equipment than that used by companies operating in the US; that its wells have three layers of pipe casing to line the wells, whereas many American ones only have two; that the barrier between the gas escaping up the pipe and ground water is thicker; that cement will be returned to the surface, blocking identified leak paths; and that drilling fluids will be collected in closed steel tanks, rather than in lined earthen pits, as often happens in the States. According to Cuadrilla's communication advisor, "Gasland (the US documentary about shale gas) really changed everything. . . . Before that, shale gas was not seen as routinely controversial."

=== Effect on house prices ===
In August 2014, a report called 'Shale Gas:Rural Economic Impacts' was published by the UK Government, in response to a Freedom of Information request, from Greenpeace. It was due for publication in March 2014. It was notable as large parts of this had been redacted, leading to criticism about the transparency of information being provided.

The Lancashire 'North West Energy Task Force', a body that broadly supports the extraction of shale gas, commissioned a report on the effect of house prices in the area surrounding the Preese Hall 1 well, after the seismic issues lead to a suspension of activity by the drilling company, Cuadrilla. The report concluded that "Taken together, there is no clear evidence based on this data to suggest that onshore gas operations have had a material impact on local house prices"

In January 2017, Friends of the Earth were instructed not to repeat claims about "plummeting house prices" after complaints and an investigation by the Advertising Standards Authority

== See also ==
- Unconventional (oil & gas) reservoir
- Cost of electricity by source
- Oil and gas industry in the United Kingdom
- Refracktion, an environmental organisation
