= R (Frack Free Balcombe Residents Association) v West Sussex CC =

R (Frack Free Balcombe) v West Sussex CC
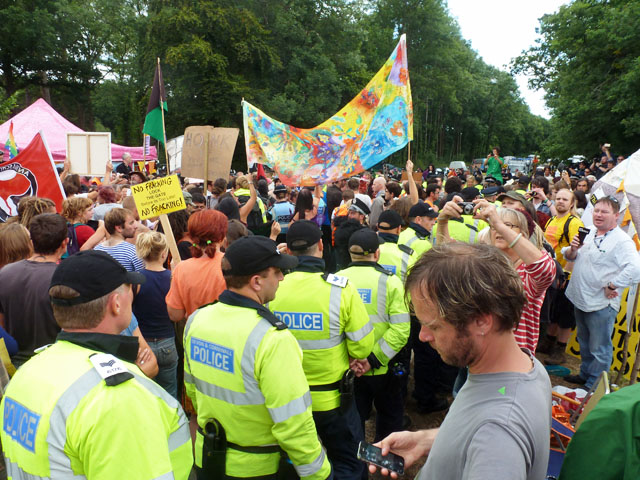
- Protest against Balcombe fracking
- Court: High Court
- Citation: [2014] EWHC 4108 (Admin)

Keywords
- Fracking, energy

R (Frack Free Balcombe Residents Association) v West Sussex CC [2014] EWHC 4108 (Admin) is a UK enterprise law case, concerning oil and gas. It held that advice to a council, granting permission to explore an existing hydrocarbon lateral borehole, was not wrong.

== Facts ==
The ‘Frack Free Balcombe Residents Association’ applied for judicial review of West Sussex County Council’s decision to give planning permission to Cuadrilla to explore and appraise an existing hydrocarbon lateral borehole for shale gas (i.e. to see if fracking would work). The Environment Agency, DECC and HSE had given their authorisations. The FFBRA claimed the council’s planning officer wrongly advised its committee that (1) it should leave pollution control, air emissions and ‘well integrity’ to the EA, HSE, etc. (2) Public Health England and HSE had said a well would be sound (3) Cuadrilla’s past breaches of planning conditions, residents objections and costs of protests were all irrelevant when they were.

== Judgment ==
Gilbart J refused the application. The council was in fact entitled to leave regulatory control to the EA and HSE, and in any case there was no evidence that regulatory controls would not be properly applied. There was no evidence that the planning officer had misled the council committee about PHE’s views on sulphur dioxide emissions into the air, produced by the flare.

81-83. Ample controls existed. 100-104. The FFBRA was really attempting to challenge the decision’s merits, not its lawfulness. 109-11. Evidence of past breaches by Cuadrilla were put before the committee, on noise and traffic routing. 116. The committee was well aware of opposition, and there was nothing wrong with the advice of looking at the issues, rather than the number of people raising them.

81. Mr Wolfe argued that the officer misled the committee on this issue. I regard that submission as being entirely without substance. PHE had asked for monitoring of SO 2 in 2013 when consulted by the EA, and that was included by EA in the permit. Contrary to the way the case was first argued by Mr Wolfe, PHE never asked at any stage for monitoring of sulphur dioxide within the flare. Indeed monitoring of its emission in the manner proposed by EA is a perfectly usual approach, and not one ever criticised by PHE. In 2014 PHE correctly pointed out that the planning application did not ask for monitoring of sulphur dioxide, and quite understandably PHE asked for it again. The description by the planning officer of what was asked for in the letter of 2014 as "similar" was therefore fair and beyond any criticism.

82. The fact is that at all times the EA have agreed with PHE that there should be air quality monitoring, which among other matters will address the emission of sulphur dioxide and other chemicals which will be produced by the flare. This argument by Mr Wolfe about the PHE consultation is in my judgment a claim which is completely without substance. It is a point which could not have been taken had the relevant documents been examined correctly before the case was pleaded.

83. In any event, even if the summary of what was said could have been improved upon by the officer, it did not go to any significant point. PHE has twice emphasised that it has no significant concerns about the proposal. Any question of the degree of monitoring is a matter to be taken up with the EA, which in the knowledge of the PHE representation, voiced no concern before the planning committee and has indeed already acted in the way in which PHE have sought.

84. It follows that I consider that there is no merit whatever in Ground 2 as taken by Mr Wolfe. Further, in so far as this matter supports his attack on the council in Ground 1 it demonstrates that much of the attack was misconceived.

[...]

100. So far as Ground 1 is concerned, it essentially comes down to Mr Wolfe arguing that it is wrong for a planning authority to consider that it can assume that environmental controls would be properly applied. He contends that it should not make the assumption if it has material placed before it which raises issues which could persuade the Planning Committee that such controls would not exist or would not be properly applied. I have already determined that in my judgment that was simply was not the case here. But in any event, in my judgment there is ample authority to the effect that the Planning Authority may in the exercise of its discretion consider that matters of regulatory control could be left to the statutory regulatory authorities to consider. There was ample material before it that all matters of concern could be and would be addressed, as set out in the officer's very careful report.

101. In my judgment what happened here was that the committee accepted its officer's advice that it had sufficient information to determine the application, and that it should and could assume that the matters could be dealt with by the EA and by the HSE. That is what she advised them, and that is what the Minutes record. She did so after setting out all the issues. That approach was entirely in keeping with long standing authority, and also with long standing policy advice. There is no question here of any gap being left in the environmental controls, and none was identified by Mr Wolfe. Each question raised by the objectors was dealt with in the officer's report with great thoroughness, and the Committee was quite entitled to accept her professional view that the matters in question could be left to the other regulatory bodies.

102. Indeed, the existence of the statutory regimes applied by the HSE, the EA and the DECC shows that there are other mechanisms for dealing with the very proper concerns which the Claimant's members have about the effects on the environment. The Claimant and its members' concerns are in truth not with the planning committee's approach of relying on the other statutory regimes, but rather with the statutory bodies whose assessments and application of standards they disagree with. That does not provide a ground of legal challenge to the decision of the planning committee.

103. Mr Wolfe has drawn the Court's attention to the use of the word "must" in the advice given by the officer. I do not regard that as altering the sense of the advice, which was that the Committee ought to assume that, and was in a position to do so. Given the terms of national policy advice, and its endorsement by the Courts, and the fact that there was ample material before the Committee on the topic, nothing turns in this case on the choice of verb.

104. Mr Wolfe's arguments on Ground 1 are in truth not a challenge to the lawfulness of the decision. They are an attempt to dress up as a challenge in law what is actually a merits argument that the WSCC Committee should have accepted that it should not regard the matters as being capable of being dealt with by HSE and EA.

[...]

109. I regard this ground argued by the Claimant as also quite without substance. No one doubts that the enforceability of a planning condition is a material matter, and evidence of past breaches must be relevant in that context. That evidence was put before the Committee. The transcript shows (page C 173) that the planning officer advised the Committee that she considered that it had enough information to assess the application. The Committee dealt with the issue carefully, and addressed the points of concern about noise and traffic routing, which had led to the breaches of the conditions under the earlier permission. The Minutes at paragraphs 16-33 show that the Committee gave very full consideration to the issues of noise monitoring and HGV movements, which were actually the subject matter of the conditions of the previous permission which had been breached.

110. It follows that the only remaining argument could be one that because CBL had breached the conditions, therefore there was an argument that there should not be a further permission on an application by CBL. The Claimants argue that because it was CBL which had breached the previous conditions, the officer was not entitled to advise the Committee, and it to consider, that in planning terms it should assume that the conditions would be complied with. As I pointed out to Mr Wolfe in argument, that was a very unwise way to take a quite different point. The occurrence of past breaches is of course relevant to the policy tests which apply to the imposition of a condition- such as necessity and enforceability (see NPPF paragraph 206) but as planning permission runs with the land, it is very hard to justify a refusal based on past breaches unless they go to the issue of enforceability. After all, the grant of a personal permission (i.e. one limited by condition to a particular applicant) is rare but permissible in policy when there are personal circumstances which are material considerations (see PPG: "Use of Planning Conditions" paragraph 15), but the grant of a personal refusal is simply unknown.

111. The Council carefully addressed how noise monitoring and traffic routing were to be achieved and enforced. It considered all the evidence put before it of past breaches. It follows in my judgment that it addressed all matters material to this issue.

[...]

127. He then reviewed the authorities. He placed particular emphasis on R v Chief Constable of the Devon and Cornwall Constabulary, ex p Central Electricity Generating Board [1981] 3 All ER 826, [1982] QB 458. He said at page 61

"The Court of Appeal there was concerned with the board's attempt to survey land in Cornwall with a view to constructing a nuclear power station, a survey which was being impeded by the non-violent activities of protesting demonstrators. The police had thought themselves powerless to act. The Court of Appeal disagreed. Lord Denning MR said ([1981] 3 All ER 826 at 832–833, [1982] QB 458 at 470–471):

'… I cannot share the view taken by the police. English law upholds to the full the right of people to demonstrate and to make their views known so long as all is done peaceably and in good order (see Hubbard v Pitt [1975] 3 All ER 1, [1976] QB 142). But the conduct of these demonstrators is not peaceful or in good order. By wilfully obstructing the operations of the board, they are deliberately breaking the law … I go further. I think that the conduct of these people, their criminal obstruction, is itself a breach of the peace. There is a breach of the peace whenever a person who is lawfully carrying out his work is unlawfully and physically prevented by another from doing it. He is entitled by law peacefully to go on with his work on his lawful occasions … If I were wrong on this point, if there was here no breach of the peace or apprehension of it, it would give a licence to every obstructor and every passive resister in the land. He would be able to cock a snook at the law as these groups have done. Public works of the greatest national importance could be held up indefinitely. This cannot be. The rule of law must prevail.'

Lawton LJ asked ([1981] 3 All ER 826 at 834, [1982] QB 458 at 472–473):

'… can those who disapprove of the exercise by a statutory body of statutory powers frustrate their exercise on private property by adopting unlawful means, not involving violence, such as lying down in front of moving vehicles, chaining themselves to equipment and sitting down where work has to be done. Such means are sometimes referred to as passive resistance. The answer is an emphatic No. If it were otherwise, there would be no rule of law. Parliament decides who shall have statutory powers and under what conditions and for what purpose they shall be used. Those who do not like what Parliament has done can protest, but they must do so in a lawful manner. What cannot be tolerated, and certainly not by the police, are protests which are not made in a lawful manner.'

Templeman LJ agreed, adding ([1981] 3 All ER 826 at 840, [1982] QB 458 at 481):

'… the powers of the police and the board are adequate to ensure that the law prevails. But it is for the police and the board to co-operate and to decide on and implement the most effective method of dealing with the obstructors.'

In the result the court refused the board's application for an order of mandamus requiring the chief constable to instruct his officers to remove the objectors. No one contemplated, however, that the protesters should have their way. On the contrary, the case stands as another trenchant endorsement of the imperative requirements of the rule of law.

In our judgment, that body of authority, taken as a whole, provides singularly little support for the contentions advanced by those now seeking to bar the livestock trade from their ports.

If we are right in holding in each case that the port authority enjoys no discretion in the matter, then plainly there presently exists no such emergency as could begin to justify non-compliance with their duty to accept this lawful trade; they would have no defence of necessity. We speak of 'enjoying' a discretion but it is right to record ABP's cogent view that in truth any discretion here would be unwelcome: they have no desire to make judgments between legal trades (or shippers) according to whatever popular protest these may attract. Still less do they relish being dragged into court to justify their judgment.

Even, however, if the port authorities are to be regarded as having a discretion to determine which legal trades to handle, then in our judgment they could not properly exercise it here in favour of this ban. One thread runs consistently throughout all the case law: the recognition that public authorities must beware of surrendering to the dictates of unlawful pressure groups. The implications of such surrender for the rule of law can hardly be exaggerated. Of course, on occasion, a variation or even short-term suspension of services may be justified. As suggested in certain of the authorities, that may be a lawful response. But it is one thing to respond to unlawful threats, quite another to submit to them—the difference, although perhaps difficult to define, will generally be easy to recognise. Tempting though it may sometimes be for public authorities to yield too readily to threats of disruption, they must expect the courts to review any such decision with particular rigour—this is not an area where they can be permitted a wide measure of discretion. As when fundamental human rights are in play, the courts will adopt a more interventionist role."

128. In my judgment that very clear statement of principle is one which must apply in this case. While I have no doubt that County Councillor Mullins meant well, the reality of her objection was that she asked WSCC to refuse to permit that which it would otherwise have permitted, on a basis that its granting permission would excite opposition leading to protests designed and intended to disrupt a perfectly lawful activity. In my judgment, had it taken County Councillor Mullins' original argument into account, WSCC would have had regard to an immaterial consideration and would have acted unlawfully.

== Significance ==
Cuadrilla announced that it was dropping their fracking operation, stating that this was a decision based on the rocks having natural fractures. In 2015 a residents association announced plans to build a solar farm to create 100% renewable energy for its community, however despite winning approval the plans were shelved in November 2015 after a reduction of tax relief for investors in community owned schemes. A more limited community organisation has focused on installing solar panels and batteries on local sites such as schools.

== See also ==
- United Kingdom enterprise law
- English land law
