= Balcombe drilling protest =

Anti-fracking protest in England

Coordinates: 51°2′50.09″N 0°7′56.75″W

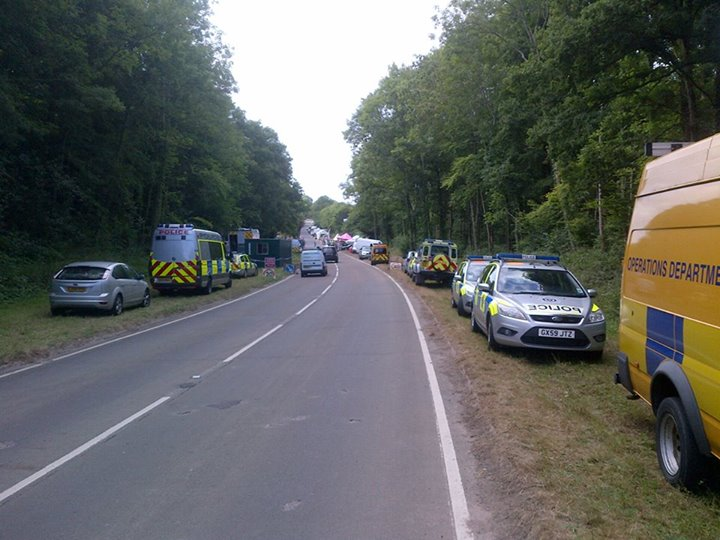
Balcombe anti-fracking protest—July 2013

The Balcombe drilling protest occurred when test drilling and possible fracking for petroleum were proposed in 2012 near Balcombe, a village in West Sussex, England. Local residents protested and anti-fracking environmentalists in the UK made it a focus of attention. The drill pad is located in a wooded area known as Lower Stumble Wood on the B2036 south of Balcombe.

== Background ==
After the initial announcement of plans to drill a local protest group was formed and a picnic was held. There was considerable opposition to exploration plans with a poll conducted by the Balcombe Parish Council showing that 82% of local residents were opposed. Cuadrilla Resources, the company that proposes to drill the well, engaged in public relations efforts attempting to convince villagers that the project was both useful and safe. Previous exploration by Conoco in the same area in 1986 was abandoned due to low production of oil. As of June 2013 Balcombe had emerged as a focus of opposition to fracking in the Weald Basin of southeast England. No actual permits that allowed for fracking were ever asked for or issued.

== Drilling ==
In July 2013 a licence to drill the well was granted by the Environment Agency and Cuadrilla began transporting equipment and supplies to the test site. The well would be 3,000 feet (910 m) deep with a possible 2,500 feet (760 m) horizontal leg. The property is owned by the Balcombe Estate which is managed by Simon Greenwood, a local resident and a member of the Balcombe Parish Council that granted permission for the well. It is the opinion of Mr. Greenwood that there is low risk for a well regulated under UK regulations.

== Protests ==
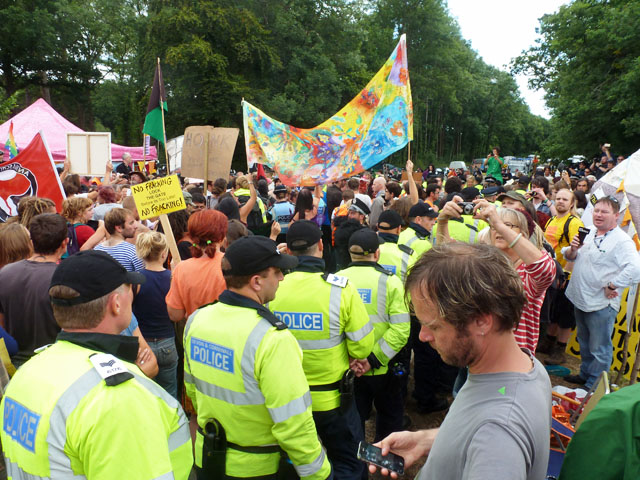

On 25 July 2013 colourfully dressed protestors blocked the gates to the site and prevented passage of a lorry with drilling equipment. On 26 July there was a heavy police presence at the gates and about a dozen protestors were arrested and charged with violation of section 241 of the Trade Union and Labour Relations (Consolidation) Act 1992 which governs picketing. Protests continued on 27 July and additional protestors were arrested. Frack Off protestors from outside the immediate area have proven to be aggressive and creative. After receiving intelligence developed by the local police of credible threats of direct action the company suspended drilling on 16 August. Up to 1,000 protesters were expected for a six-day "Reclaim the Power" camp at the annual meeting of the No Dash for Gas environmental action movement. Workshops in skills-sharing in campaign building and direct action were planned. The height of the security fence around the site was doubled and razor wire installed.

== No Dash for Gas camp ==
Hundreds of protesters from throughout the UK camped on private land at the so-called No Dash for Gas "Reclaim the Power" camp during the weekend of 17–18 August about a mile from the drilling pad in a field west of Cherry Lane near the intersection with London Road (B2036)in Cuckfield Parish. Facilities such as kitchens and toilets were erected without permission to support hundreds of expected participants. 38 Degrees, a not-for-profit political-activism organisation reported raising £50,000 with £30,000 budgeted to support local groups, £10,000 for training, and £10,000 on development of internet sites and infrastructure. 2,000 marched in Balcombe on held Sunday with direct action scheduled to commence on Monday. After 2 days of direct action protests the camp began breaking up on Wednesday 21 August, leaving a contingent of those who have been protesting since July behind.

== Direct action ==
On 19 August activists engaged in direct actions at Cuadrilla headquarters in Lichfield, Staffordshire, and at the London offices of Bell Pottinger, which conducts its public relations. A few protesters gained entry to Cuadrilla's building and posted banners reading "Reclaim the Power" and "Power to the People", and, at Bell Pottinger, several protesters super glued themselves to the entrance, posting a banner over its entrance reading "Bell Pottinger Fracking Liars". The entrance to the drilling site was also blocked by protesters who were locked together. There was a heavy police presence. As the day progressed the protesters where pushed to the side; dozens of arrests were made including Caroline Lucas the only Green Party MP. Lucas was released on bail the next day. Most arrests at the entrance to the drilling site were made under a section of the Public Order Act, failure to comply with a condition made by a senior police officer on the scene. There were also direct actions at the homes of Lord Howell and Francis Maude, the Conservative MP who represents Balcombe.

== Significance ==
According to Fiona Harvey of The Guardian the Balcombe protests coincide with movement of the issue of hydraulic fracturing to the front of the public agenda in the United Kingdom. The initial permits to drill near Balcombe were issued routinely as were permits in other parts of the UK such as Lancashire where fracking operations are believed to have resulted in two small earthquakes. As of August 2013 public opinion was evenly divided with about 40% of the public for and 40% against. The Balcombe protests occurred against a background of political and public relations blunders such as this remark by the government energy minister Michael Fallon:

The beauty of that—please don't write this down—is that of course [the oil and gas resources of the Weald Basin] are underneath the commentariat. All these people writing leaders saying, "Why don't they get on with shale?" We are going to see how thick their rectory walls are, whether they like the flaring at the end of the drive.

There is growing public awareness of the potential impacts of industrial scale exploitation of shale gas.

== Judicial Review Request ==
On 5 December 2014 the High Court has dismissed Frack Free Balcombe Residents' Association's (FFBRA's) claim for a judicial review to quash the County Council's grant of planning permission for oil and gas exploration and appraisal south of Balcombe.

According to Mr Justice Gilbart, author of the judgement, there was never really a question of fracking at Balcombe:

I have no doubt whatever that this proposal has caused considerable concern to the Claimant Association. I recognise also that some parts of the public are concerned about the process commonly known as "fracking" although I must observe also that this application did not seek permission for that activity.

The judgement concludes by rejecting the request for a judicial review.

== See also ==
- Hydraulic fracturing in the United Kingdom
- Environmental impact of hydraulic fracturing
- Anti-fracking movement
- 2012–2014 Romanian protests against shale gas
