= Francis Egan =

Chief executive of Cuadrilla Resources

Francis Egan (born June 1961) is the chief executive of Cuadrilla Resources. He joined the natural resources industry in the 1980s with Marathon Oil and subsequently worked offshore as a production engineer in the North Sea and then with BHP.
