= Anti-fracking movement =

Environmental activism

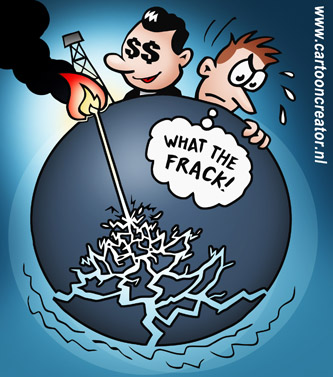
Cartoon about problems with fracking gas production

The anti-fracking movement is a political movement that seeks to ban the practice of extracting natural gasses from shale rock formations to provide power due to its negative environmental impact. These effects include the contamination of drinking water, disruption of ecosystems, and adverse effects on human and animal health. Additionally, the practice of fracking increases the amount of carbon dioxide released into the atmosphere, escalating the process of climate change and global warming. An anti-fracking movement has emerged both internationally, with involvement of international environmental organizations, and nation states such as France and locally in affected areas such as Balcombe, Sussex, in the UK. Pungești in Romania, Žygaičiai in Lithuania, and In Salah in Algeria. Through the use of direct action, media, and lobbying, the anti-fracking movement is focused on holding the gas and oil industry accountable for past and potential environmental damage, extracting compensation from and taxation of the industry to mitigate impact, and regulation of gas development and drilling activity.

== Europe ==
=== UK ===
The Frack Off campaign is a grassroots direct action against unconventional gas and oil extraction.

On 26 September 2018, four men blocked a convoy of trucks carrying drilling equipment to a site on Preston New Road near Blackpool. They were arrested, convicted of causing a public nuisance, and given custodial sentences; two for 16 months, one for 15 months, and one 12 months suspended. One of the men's lawyers said they were the first environmental activists to be imprisoned in the UK since the Mass trespass of Kinder Scout in 1932. Following an appeal the sentences were overturned at the Court of Appeal and the imprisoned men were released.

== North America ==
Environmental concerns about fracking began to take hold in the United States when Josh Fox released Gasland in 2010, a documentary on the social and environmental impacts of fracking. Gasland, depicting the effect of hydraulic fracking on American homeowners near these sites, sparked an increased interest in the anti-fracking movement through the news coverage, social media content, and environmental activism that followed the film’s release. In 2011, the town of Dryden, New York became one of the first communities in the state to ban fracking in their community. This ban was initiated by grass roots activists of the Dryden Resource Awareness Coalition who began collecting signatures for a ballot measure in 2010. By 2014, 400 communities across the country had taken similar actions in their own towns. Notably, in 2014, New York City’s anti-fracking movement won a significant victory, managing to get Governor Cuomo to ban fracking in the state. This victory is due to the large number of environmental groups present and active in New York. In 2020, the New York state legislature codified a ban on fracking permanently into its 2021 budget, constituting a more substantial commitment to end fracking than the executive action taken by Governor Cuomo in 2014. This ban is due to years of grassroots organizing across the state of New York in which activists obtained tens of thousands of petition signatures and convinced 200 municipalities to pioneer their own anti-fracking initiatives.

Celebrity support has also been a notable part of the Anti-Fracking Movement. Actor Mark Ruffalo, who lives in New York City, became a major opponent to fracking. Ruffalo laid out his full case against fracking in a piece co-authored with Phil Radford on CNN.com, where he argued solar and wind sources of power are available now, and using fracked natural gas instead of cleaner sources of energy will result in more faucets on fire, methane leaks that cause global warming, groundwater contamination, and cancer causing chemicals in communities. In New York, more than 180 entertainment, music, film artists (including Lady Gaga, Robert de Niro, Mark Ruffalo, Paul McCartney, and Susan Sarandon) are recognized as members of Artists Against Fracking, a group that opposes fracking in the Marcellus shale.

== In film ==
- Split Estate (2009)
- Gasland (2010)
- Gasland: Part II (2013)
- The Sky Is Pink (2013)
- Groundswell Rising (2014)
- Frack Off (UK)
- Frackman (Australia, 2015)
- BoJack Horseman, Season 4 (2017)
- Water Is Life (Australia, 2018)

== See also ==
- 2012–14 Romanian protests against shale gas
- Artists Against Fracking
- Balcombe drilling protest
- Environmental impact of hydraulic fracturing
- Frack Off
- Refracktion
