= Roy Franklin (geologist) =

Roy Alexander Franklin, OBE, (born 1953) is the chairman of Cuadrilla Resources Holdings Limited and a board member of Norwegian oil and gas company Statoil. He is a non-executive director of Amec Foster Wheeler. He has a number of other executive appointments.

Roy Franklin was appointed chair of the Board of Directors of John Wood Group PLC ("Wood") with effect from 1 September 2019. Under Roy's leadership, the share price of Wood dropped significantly from 378p/share to a low of 18.4p/share.
