= Artists Against Fracking =

Organisation of artists protesting against a method natural gas extraction

Artists Against Fracking is an association of artists started by Yoko Ono and her son, Sean Lennon, also including Mark Ruffalo, Robert de Niro, Paul McCartney, Lady Gaga and Deepak Chopra.

== History ==
As of August 2012, 180 artists were part of the group, which opposes natural gas drilling in the Marcellus shale.

In March 2013, the Independent Oil & Gas Association of New York filed a complaint with the New York Lobbying Board claiming the group had violated lobbying regulations, following an Associated Press news story suggesting that they should formally register as a lobbying group and had not done so. Hydraulic fracking is prohibited in New York state.

== See also ==
- Anti-fracking movement
