= Trawden Limestone Group =

- Stratigraphic range: Chadian-Brigantian sub-stages
- Type: Group
- Unit of: Carboniferous Limestone Supergroup
- Underlies: Bowland Shale Formation
- Overlies: Roddlesworth Formation
- Thickness: up to 1055m

Lithology
- Primary: limestone
- Other: mudstone, chert, dolomite

Location
- Region: northern England
- Extent: Lancashire, Yorkshire

Type section
- Named for: Trawden

The Trawden Limestone Group is a lithostratigraphical term referring to the succession of limestone rock strata which occur in parts of Lancashire and neighbouring Yorkshire, northern England in the United Kingdom laid down within the Chadian to Brigantian sub-Stages of the Carboniferous Period.

The Trawden Limestone Group is preceded (underlain) by the Roddlesworth Formation. It is succeeded (overlain) by the Bowland Shale Formation.

== See also ==
- Geology of Lancashire
