= Weald–Artois Anticline =

Geologic structure in southern England and northern France

Geological map of southeast England and the region around the English Channel, showing the Weald-Artois anticline in its regional context.

Cross-section over the Wealden anticline

The Weald–Artois Anticline, or Wealden Anticline, is a large anticline, a geological structure running between the regions of the Weald in southern England and Artois in northern France. The fold formed during the Alpine orogeny, from the late Oligocene to middle Miocene as an uplifted form of the Weald basin through inversion of the basin. The folding resulted in uplift of about 180 metres (590 ft), though concurrent erosion may have substantially reduced the actual height of the resulting chalk ridges.

As is the case with all anticlines, older rock strata are found in the core of the structure. These are in this case Upper Jurassic and Lower Cretaceous strata. The western part of the ridge (the Weald of Kent, Sussex and Surrey in England) has been greatly eroded, with the presumed chalk surface removed to expose older, Lower Cretaceous rocks (Wealden Group) and a small area of Upper Jurassic Purbeck Beds. On the French side of the English Channel more Upper Jurassic rocks crop out in a small area around Boulogne-sur-Mer and Desvres. At the flanks of the anticline outcrops of the (younger) Upper Cretaceous Chalk occur. The chalk survives as a rim of inward-facing escarpments, forming the North Downs and South Downs. The Chalk forms characteristic white cliffs on both sides of the English Channel, an example being the White Cliffs of Dover.

== Formation of the Strait of Dover ==
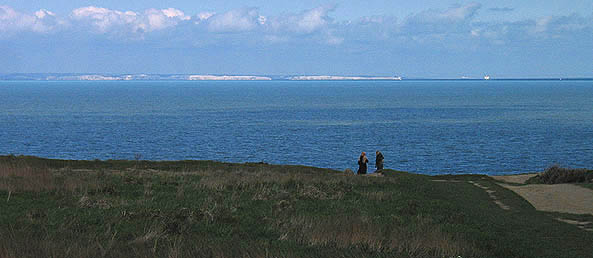
The white cliffs of Dover as seen from Cap Gris-Nez. The Straits of Dover were carved out of the anticline surface layer, presumably chalk, by glacial lake outburst floods

The Strait of Dover is geologically speaking a very young feature, which cuts through the much older Weald–Artois Anticline. The anticline continues uninterrupted in the subsurface of the Strait of Dover and English Channel.

Gupta et al. argue that the section of the anticline between Britain and France was destroyed by two megafloods caused by the breaching of proglacial lakes. The first occurred around 450,000 years ago during the Anglian Glaciation (MIS 12). It did not fully destroy the anticline although there was sporadic connection between the English Channel and the North Sea during periods of high sea level. The second megaflood occurred around 160,000 years ago during the Wolstonian/Saalian glaciation (MIS 6), after which Britain was an island during periods of high sea level.

During the most recent glacial period, lowering of sea levels joined the British Isles once more to the continental mainland of Europe via Doggerland, until about 6500–6200 BCE.
