= Refracktion =

Refracktion is a British group concerned with the environmental impact of hydraulic fracturing (fracking) for gas on the Fylde Coast of Lancashire, England. They believe fracking will have inevitable negative effects on the local environment and its amenity value.

Refracktion referred the fracking company Cuadrilla Resources to the Advertising Standards Authority over a brochure published by the company that claimed fracking was safe. Six of 18 specific complaints were upheld, however, 11 of the 18 controversial passages were deemed to be acceptable .

== See also ==
- Environmental impact of hydraulic fracturing
- Hydraulic fracturing in the United Kingdom
