= Bowland Shale =

Geological formation in England

- Stratigraphic range: Visean to Bashkirian
- Type: Formation
- Unit of: Craven Group
- Underlies: Millstone Grit Group or Morridge Formation
- Overlies: Pendleside Limestone Formation, Widmerpool Formation, Pentre Chert Formation, Cefn-y-Fedw Sandstone Formation, Hodderense Limestone Formation, Trawden Limestone Group, Malham Formation, Yoredale Group
- Thickness: 120-620 m

Lithology
- Primary: shale
- Other: limestone, sandstone

Location
- Region: northern England
- Country: United Kingdom
- Extent: Isle of Man, northern England, parts of North Wales and the Midlands

Type section
- Named for: Forest of Bowland

The Bowland Shale or Bowland Shale Formation is a Carboniferous geological formation of Asbian (Visean) to Yeadonian (Bashkirian) age. It is known from outcrop and subsurface borehole data in the north of England, the Isle of Man, parts of North Wales and the Midlands. It is an organic-rich shale which, according to the British Geological Survey, is the source rock where "oil and gas matured before migration to conventional fields in the East Midlands and the Irish Sea", for example, the Formby oil field. The Bowland Shale, together with other organic-rich Carboniferous shale units, is being considered for exploitation for shale gas.

In 2015, research by the University of Aberdeen discovered "high levels of selenium in rock samples from the Bowland shale". In May 2022, a paper published in the Energy Policy journal described the extraction of shale gas at Bowland shale as a "carbon bomb"—a fossil fuel extraction project with the potential to emit more than 1Gt of CO_{2} over its lifetime.

== See also ==
- Geology of Lancashire
- Shale gas in the United Kingdom
- Unconventional (oil & gas) reservoir
