= Cuadrilla Resources =

British drilling and fracking company

- Industry: Oil and gas exploration
- Founder: Chris Cornelius
- Headquarters: Bamber Bridge, England, United Kingdom
- Key people: Roy Franklin, Chairman (2015–present), Lord Browne, Chairman (2007–2015), Francis Egan, CEO
- Products: Shale gas, oil
- Owner: AJ Lucas (93%), Cuadrilla Employees (7%)
- Website: cuadrillaresources.com

Cuadrilla Resources is an oil and gas exploration and production company founded in 2007. It is headquartered in Bamber Bridge, Lancashire, and has operations in the United Kingdom. Its chairman is Roy Franklin, who is also deputy chairman of Equinor. Its chief executive is Francis Egan. The company intended to develop shale gas in the UK by using high volume hydraulic fracturing (HVHF), but in 2019 a high court ruling ultimately banned the process. Few wells were ever commissioned, and Cuadrilla, was supposed to have started plugging and decommissioning them in 2022.

== Corporate structure ==
Cuadrilla is a privately owned company with headquarters in the United Kingdom. The company was founded in 2007, financed with investment from the Australian engineering company AJ Lucas and the American equity firm Riverstone Holdings. It is owned 93% by AJ Lucas, while Cuadrilla employees (including former employees) own the remaining 7%. Riverstone Holdings sold their previous 45% stake to AJ Lucas and exited the business in February 2020. In 2009, Riverstone had settled corruption charges in New York through its partner The Carlyle Group.

In April 2015, Roy Franklin, Deputy chair of the Board of Statoil ASA, and board member of Santos Ltd, Kerogen Capital Ltd and Amec Foster Wheeler, replaced Lord Browne, who had been chairman since 2007. The chief executive is Francis Egan.

== Operations ==
As of 2013, the company held licences for ten sites in the UK and had drilled three wells, all in Lancashire, one of which has been hydraulically fractured since 1993 by a previous owner; The company produces gas from that well, completed in sandstone.

=== Lancashire ===
- Grange Hill, Singleton: Cuadrilla drilled in 2011, and in September 2011 announced the discovery of 200 trillion cubic feet of gas in place under the Fylde Coast in Lancashire. Cuadrilla hoped to recover 10–20% of the gas. and that it could provide 5,600 jobs in the UK at the peak of production. At the same time Lord Browne claimed that the Lancashire discovery could satisfy the UK's gas consumption "for 56 years". The Grange Hill site was returned to green fields in 2018.

In 2012 media reported that the find was "so rich it could meet Britain's needs for decades", that shale gas in Lancashire alone could deliver £6 billion of gas a year for the next three decades, and that it had "the potential to do more for Lancashire than the cotton industry." The British Geological Survey, responsible for producing UK's mineral resource inventories, and far more cautious in its estimates, re-evaluated its projections in light of the find.
As of February 2013 Cuadrilla estimated that Lancashire's shale gas could have a market value of £136 billion. and in July 2013, Cuadrilla applied for a permit to hydraulic fracturing of the well it drilled at Grange Hill.

In April 2014, Cuadrilla published news of their continuing consultation with residents shale gas exploration sites in the Fylde. existing gas well at Elswick, near one of its sites in Lancashire, was fracked in 1993 by its then owners, Independent Energy.

- Weeton, Lancashire: The company drilled a well and two small earthquakes were caused by its hydraulic fracturing in April 2011. One of the earthquakes was large enough to be felt by some people at the surface and caused some property damage. The earthquakes led to a government-ordered moratorium on hydraulic fracturing, which has since been lifted.
- Elswick: The gas well had been drilled and hydraulically fractured by British Gas in 1993. The gas extracted from sandstone has been used to generate electricity for the national grid. Bought by Cuadrilla in 2010. Cuadrilla has frequently used this as a showpiece site. Cuadrilla's promotional use of Elswick brought it into conflict with the Advertising Standards Authority (United Kingdom).
- Little Plumpton: Planning permission was refused by Lancashire County Council. However, this decision was appealed by Cuadrilla and the government accepted their appeal in 2016. An appeal against this reversed decision has lost in the Court of Appeal in January 2018.
- On 24 July 2018, the Energy Minister gave Cuadrilla a permit to begin fracking at a Lancashire well. Claire Perry said: "Our world-class regulations will ensure that shale exploration will maintain robust environmental standards and meet the expectations of local communities" in response to criticisms levied at the new licence. Cuadrilla plans to submit an application for a second fracking licence in the near future.

Other sites:

- Becconsall, Banks: drilled in 2011. The site has now been returned to green fields.

=== Elsewhere in the United Kingdom ===
A proposed test well, half a mile from Balcombe in West Sussex, scheduled for summer 2013, was the scene of protests. Caudrilla had explained that the drilling would last no more than four months and would not involve fracking, however they were to use acid washing to open natural fractures. Their planning permission was to expire on 28 September 2013. They were to take samples of rock at around 900m (3,000 feet). Cuadrilla suspended its drilling plans in August 2013 after consulting with the Sussex police, citing "threats of direct action against the exploration site". The company said that the halt was done in the interests of safety of the drilling crew, the protesters, and the public.

Other sites:

- Cowden, Kent: originally drilled by another company in 1999.
- Lingfield, Surrey: expired planning permission only

=== Poland ===
In 2012, Cuadrilla was awarded the Pionki hydrocarbon exploration licence in Poland, which covered an area of over 820 square-kilometres in the greater Lublin Trough/Radom-Krasnik High. The northern half of the licence or "Lublin Trough" contained Devonian and Carboniferous shales, while the southern half of the licence or "Radom-Krasnik High" was mapped to contain both Silurian and Devonian shales.

=== Netherlands ===
Cuadrilla has two subsidiaries in the Netherlands, Cuadrilla Hardenberg BV and Cuadrilla Brabant BV, for shale gas exploration^{: 27}. The company has previously held two licences. The one in Noordoostpolder, which covers an area of over 200,000 acres, is composed of Namurian shales. The North Brabant licence, which covers more than 470,000 acres, is made up of Carboniferous, Triassic and Jurassic shales which are thought to contain tight gas, shale gas and oil shale.

In 2014, Cuadrilla requested an extension of its permits for the detection of shale gas in those areas. The following year, the government did not agree to an extension of the exploration licences and as a result these expired during 2015^{:2}.

=== Hungary ===
Cuadrilla was previously part of a joint venture for shale gas exploration in Hungary. The investment was sold in 2018 ^{:28}. In Tompa 38,796 acres composed of recomplete Miocene were described to contain multi TCF Basin Centred TGS.

== Controversies ==
=== Earthquakes ===
In December 2018 fracking was halted by a 1.5 magnitude earthquake caused by the fracking operation.

On 22 August 2019 fracking at Preston New Road was halted because of a 1.6 magnitude earthquake caused by the fracking operation.

On 26 August 2019 fracking was halted again because of a 2.9 magnitude earthquake.

In 2022 analysis showed that fracking at Preston New Road in Lancashire caused daily earthquakes during its operation (192 earthquakes in 182 days in 2018-19).

=== Conflict of Interest ===
Cuadrilla has also funded, in conjunction with Centrica the North West Energy Task Force which on 8 January 2015 organised an Open Letter to Lancashire County Council in support of fracking. This letter was signed by Jane Watson, sister of Robert Altham, the judge who sentenced three anti-fracking protesters to prison in September 2018.

=== Claim of economic benefits of hydraulic fracturing ===
Cuadrilla gave evidence to the British parliament in Westminster in 2011, based on an analysis by Pöyry consultancy, that using the shale gas reserves in Lancashire could lower British natural gas prices by as much as four per cent, and indirectly lower electricity prices. However, at a 2013 meeting in Sussex Cuadrilla's public relations spokesman Mark Linder of Bell Pottinger said: "We've done an analysis and it's [the influence on prices] a very small...at the most it's a very small percentage...basically insignificant."

=== Misleading advertising ===
In April 2013, the UK Advertising Standards Authority (ASA) compelled Cuadrilla to withdraw a brochure published the previous year following a complaint by anti-fracking group Refracktion concerning 18 statements it argued were misleading, of which the ASA upheld 6, plus one in part. Cuadrilla reportedly hired Westbourne Communications to assist with its efforts to promote fracking.
