= Weald Basin =

Topographical feature in UK and France

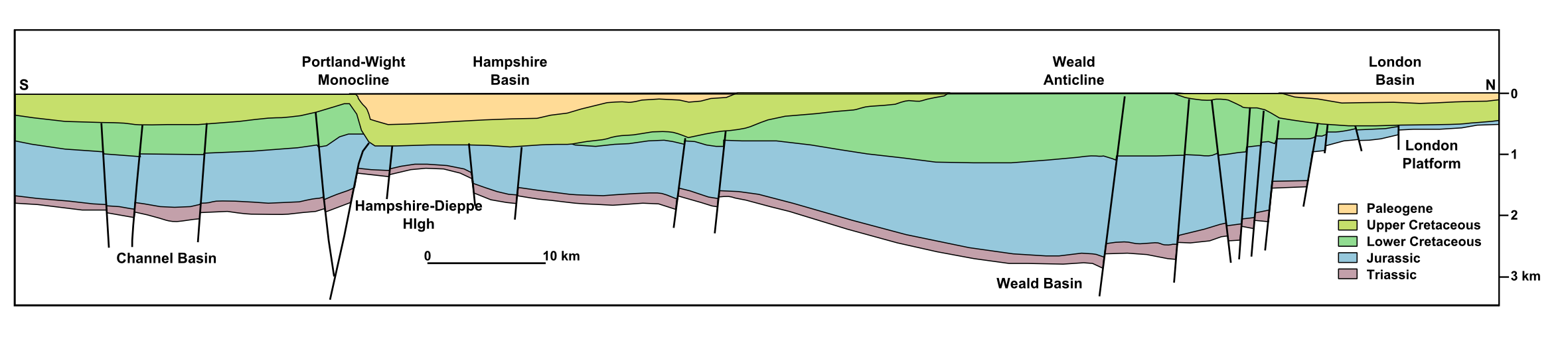
Section across southern England showing the inverted nature of the Weald Basin

The Weald Basin (/ˈwiːld/) is a major topographic feature of the area that is now southern England and northern France from the Triassic to the Late Cretaceous. Its uplift in the Late Cretaceous marked the formation of the Wealden Anticline. The rock strata contain hydrocarbon deposits which have yielded coal, oil and gas.

== Formation ==
Geological map of southeast England and the region around the English Channel, showing the Weald-Artois anticline and therefore the modern day form of the Weald Basin in its regional context

The Weald Basin's formation commenced during the Carboniferous, with the rocks which are today basement deposited within a low swamp providing coals which were exploited to the north and east in Kent, but boreholes drilled in the 19th century failed to find this deposit in the area of the Weald. The Carboniferous coals may be overlain by early Triassic sediments. The sediments were uplifted and faulted within the Variscan Orogeny, with the land now occupied by the Weald Basin being a low external fold belt to the main orogeny, which was located within the present day English Channel. The remnants of the mountain belt can be seen today in Devon and Cornwall in what is known as the Cornubian Massif. Unlike in Devon and Cornwall the deformation caused little or no metamorphism.

The mountain belt collapsed soon after the orogeny, leading to the former northward thrusts to be reactivated as normal faults, and led to the formation of the Weald basin, which developed as an extension of the considerably larger Wessex Basin . Reconstructions of the geometry of the early fault systems in the Weald Basin reveal that for the early history of the basin a series of steep normal faults to the north were active against the London-Brabant Massif, but it is not clear whether this reflects a syn-rift origin for these rocks. The Weald basin gently subsided throughout the Jurassic, Cretaceous and Early Tertiary leading to a thick succession of sedimentary rocks being deposited. During the Early Jurassic a north and east shallowing mud-dominated shelf developed.

== Basin reactivation ==
Geological section from north to south of the Wealden Anticline, note the unsymmetrical lower Cretaceous/Jurassic sediments in the core of the anticline. The diagram has undergone extensive vertical exaggeration

As a result of the Alpine orogeny the basin was squeezed between the basement to the north and the south, this resulted in the reactivation of the formerly normal faults into minor thrusts (as they had been during the Variscan Orogeny) and the formation of the Wealden Anticline. The region's two surface structural highs (areas of crust and rocks which are uplifted), the Wealden Anticline and the Channel High, are superimposed upon earlier, Mesozoic basins, (the Weald and Channel basins). This nearly exact superimposition of compressional features upon underlying formerly extensional features exemplifies perfectly the principles of structural inversion across a large and well defined geologic feature. The overall uplift produced by the Tertiary inversion in the eastern Wealden basin has been estimated to be as much as 1525 m; which as a result of the large amount of Mesozoic sediments does not reveal the underlying Paleozoic basement. Utilising estimations of the original thickness of Chalk (400–460 m) and other Mesozoic strata indicate a complex fold structure which, in the event it was not eroded during uplift, attained a crestal elevation of 1400 m over what is today Ashdown Forest. However it is likely that erosion kept pace with uplift, resulting in large quantities of sediment supply to the North Sea and the English Channel

== Economic resources ==
Coal seams were discovered when test boring for an early proposal for a Channel Tunnel at Dover in 1890. This led to the development of four deep mines in the Kent Coalfield in the early 20th century. The Weald Basin has yielded significant quantities of gypsum from Jurassic Purbeck beds and a number of brickworks exploit the lower Cretaceous clays.

The inversion of the Weald Basin throughout the late Cretaceous and early Tertiary resulted in the formation of the Wealden Anticline and a number of smaller anticlines within the larger structure. The discovery in 1897 of natural gas while drilling for water at Heathfield railway station provided fuel for the first natural gas lighting in the United Kingdom. The existence of the same strata within the Weald basin which are the source rocks for the Wytch Farm oilfield in Dorset led to an interest in the petroleum potential of the Wealden anticline, with exploration taking place on Ashdown forest examining the Ashdown Anticline, a large structure over 30 km long x 7 km wide, located in the centre of the Weald Basin in north Sussex; significant quantities of natural gas were found but oil was absent. Oil and gas have subsequently been found at a number of sites in the Weald including Singleton and Storrington in West Sussex, Godstone and Lingfied in Surrey, and Cowden in Kent. In 2009 remaining recoverable oil reserves in the Weald Basin were estimated at one and a half million tonnes. In 2010 the Weald Basin contributed 18% of onshore gas and less than 5% of onshore oil production in the UK. As of August 2013 there was significant opposition to hydraulic fracturing developing in southeast England centred on Balcombe where an exploratory well was planned and the Balcombe drilling protest was in progress.

A BGS/Department for Energy and Climate Change (DECC) report from May 2014 suggest that there is the possibility for the extraction of light tight oil (LTO) in Weald Basin and the average figure of 4.4 billion barrels (700 million cubic metres) is suggested. The overall range of estimations is from 2.2 to 8.6 billion barrels (350 to 1,370 million cubic metres). The data is said to have a "high degree of uncertainty", and the amount that could be produced is unknown, and could be zero.

== See also ==
- The Weald region in South East England
- Geology of East Sussex
- Wessex Basin, and its oil fields
