= White Deer Creek =

River in Pennsylvania, United States

Coordinates: 41°04′48″N 76°51′57″W

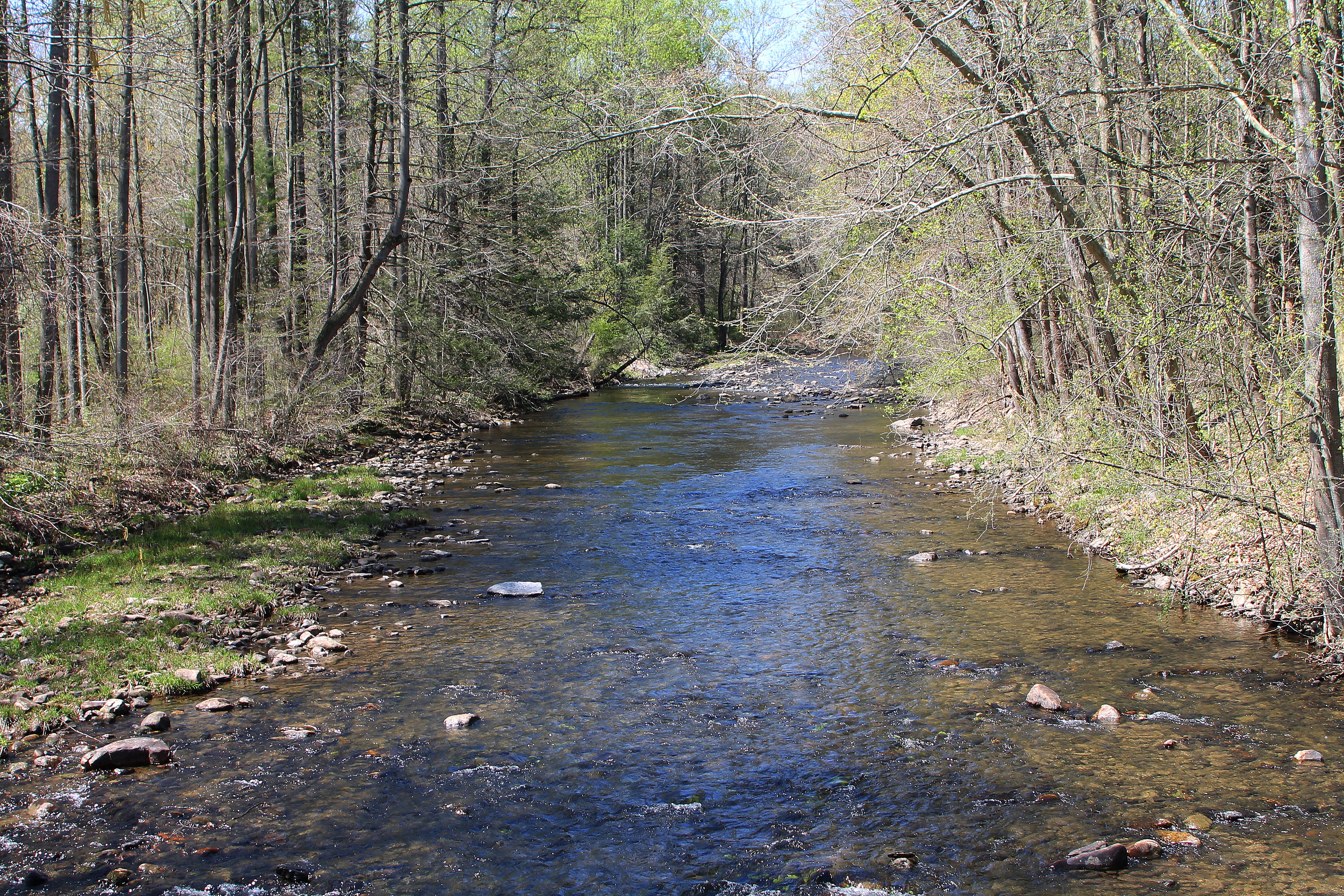
- White Deer Creek looking upstream near Old Furnace
- Etymology: translation of its native name, meaning "white-deer stream"
- Native name: Woap'-achtu-hanne (Unami)

Physical characteristics
- Source
  - location: valley to the north of Hall Mountain in Miles Township, Pennsylvania
  - elevation: 1,872 ft (571 m)
- Mouth
  - location: West Branch Susquehanna River in West Buffalo Township, Union County, Pennsylvania near White Deer
  - elevation: 446 ft (136 m)
- Length: 28 mi (45 km)
- Discharge
  - average: 73.06 cu ft/s (2.069 m^{3}/s) (near White Deer, water years 1969–1973)

Basin features
- Progression: West Branch Susquehanna River → Susquehanna River → Chesapeake Bay
- Tributaries
  - left: Cowbell Hollow, Sand Spring Run, Mile Run, Lick Run
  - right: Tunis Run

White Deer Creek is a tributary of the West Branch Susquehanna River in Centre County and Union County, in Pennsylvania, in the United States. It is approximately 28 miles (45 km) long and flows through Miles Township in Centre County and Hartley Township, Lewis Township, West Buffalo Township, and White Deer Township in Union County. The watershed of the creek has an area of 45.1 square miles (117 km^{2}). Parts of the creek are designated as impaired. The creek's discharge near White Deer can be as low as 3 cubic feet per second (0.085 m^{3}/s) or as high as 169 cubic feet per second (4.8 m^{3}/s).

White Deer Creek is a freestone stream in mountainous terrain. It is relatively small and flows through a valley that is narrow, but can be up to 1,000 feet (300 m) wide. The creek flows alongside Interstate 80 for much of its length. A significant part of the land in the creek's watershed is forested, with large areas being owned by the Pennsylvania Bureau of Forestry.

The watershed of the creek is designated as a High-Quality Coldwater Fishery and a Migratory Fishery. It has both brook trout and brown trout and is stocked with trout.

White Deer Creek's name comes from the word Woap'-achtu-hanne, meaning "white-deer stream". The creek appeared on maps as early as 1759. A number of mills were erected adjacent to it during the eighteenth and nineteenth centuries. Major historic industries in the watershed included lumbering and agriculture. A number of bridges have been erected across the creek. Much of the length of White Deer Creek is in Bald Eagle State Forest; the creek also passes through McCalls Dam State Park. Other recreational opportunities include angling and canoeing.

== Course ==
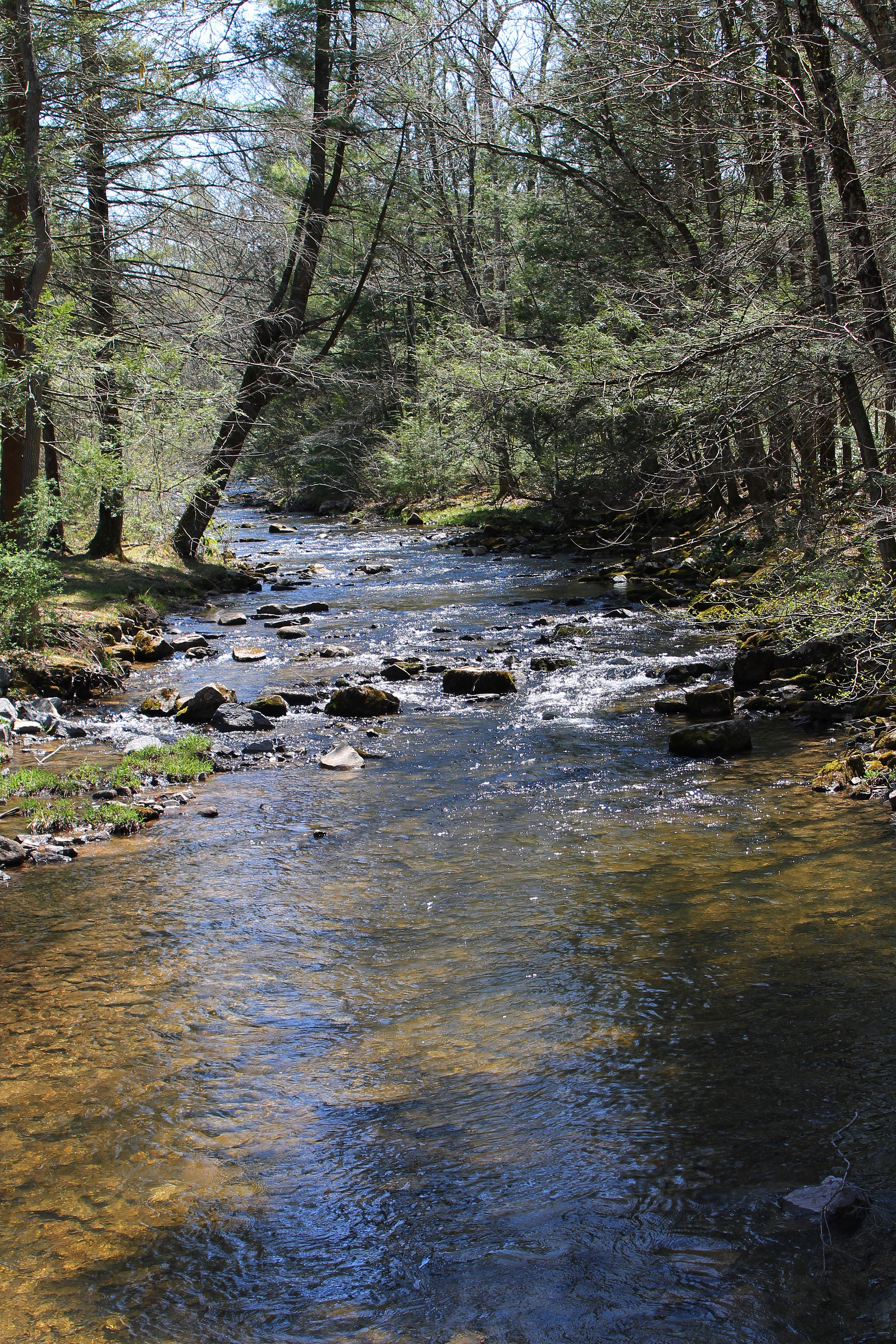
White Deer Creek above the tributary Sand Spring Run

White Deer Creek begins in a valley to the north of Hall Mountain in Miles Township, Centre County, near the Centre County/Clinton County line. It flows east through its relatively deep, narrow valley for more than a mile before receiving its first named tributary, Tunis Run, from the right. The creek then meanders east-northeast through its valley for several miles, passing near several mountains, such as McCall Mountain, along the way. It eventually exits Miles Township and Centre County.

Upon exiting Centre County, White Deer Creek enters Hartley Township, Union County. It continues meandering east-northeast for several tenths of a mile before entering Lewis Township. In this township, the creek continues meandering east-northeast for a few miles, passing more mountains before entering West Buffalo Township. In this township, it flows east-northeast for more than a mile before turning northeast for several tenths of a mile and receiving the tributary Cowbell Hollow from the left. Shortly afterwards, the creek turns northwest for a few tenths of a mile before turning north-northeast and receiving its longest tributary, Sand Spring Run, from the left and passing Pine Flat. The creek then begins flowing east-northeast again, now fairly close to Interstate 80, and receives the tributary Mile Run from the left and passing Little Mountain. Several tenths of a mile further downstream, it enters White Deer Township. The creek heads east for several tenths of a mile before receiving Lick Run, its last named tributary, from the left.

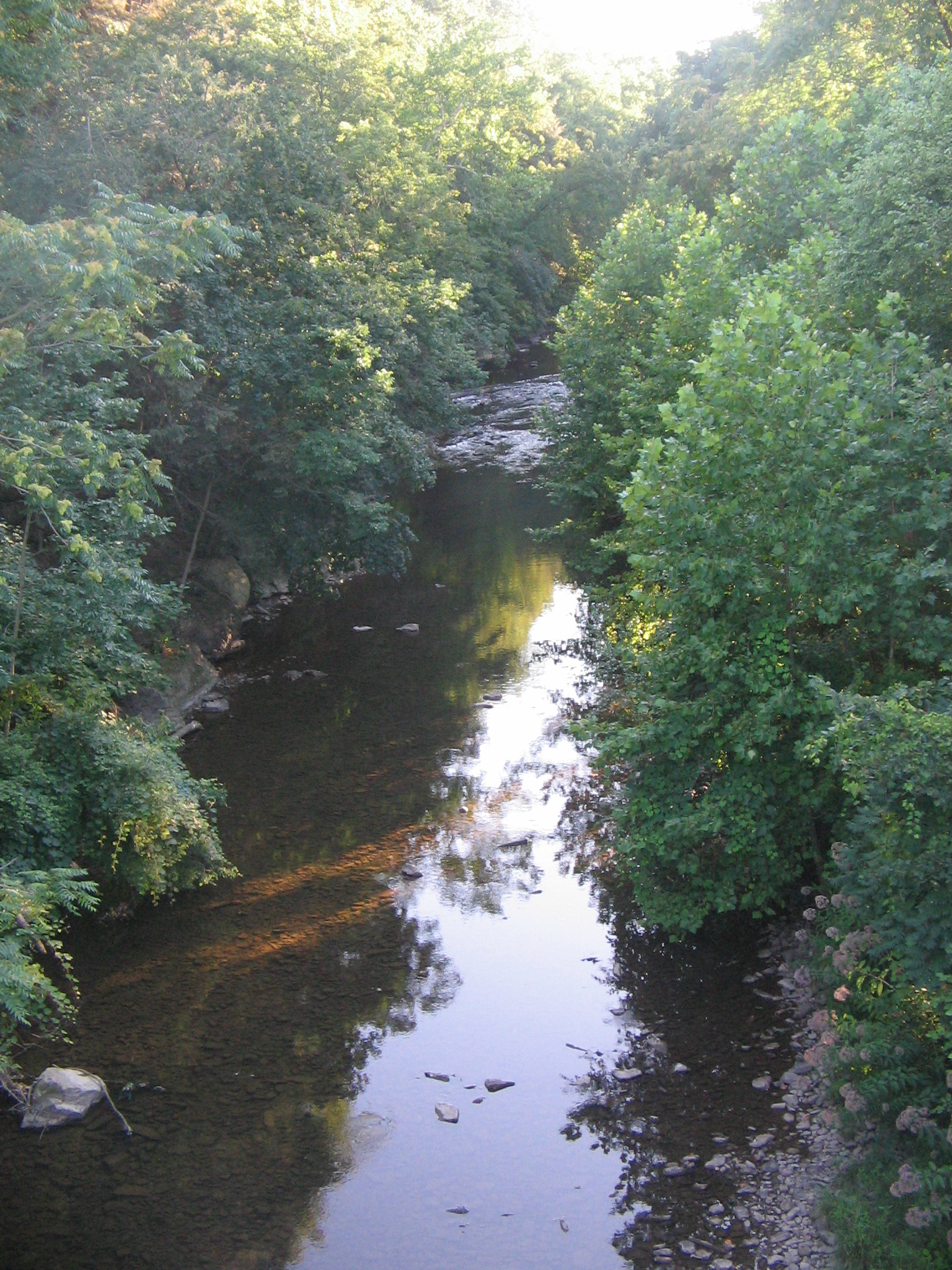
White Deer Creek in White Deer Township, from the US Route 15 bridge

White Deer Creek then turns northeast for several tenths of a mile before turning east. For the next several miles, the creek heads in a generally easterly direction between South White Deer Ridge and Catharines Crown/Nittany Mountain, still alongside Interstate 80. The creek's valley broadens and in leaves behind Catharines Crown; by this point there are no more mountains on its southern side. It turns northeast and then east-southeast before turning east-northeast and crossing Interstate 80. The creek then flows east for a few miles, still following South White Deer Ridge. It then crosses US Route 15 and a few tenths of a mile later, reaches its confluence with the West Branch Susquehanna River.

White Deer Creek joins the West Branch Susquehanna River 15.76 miles (25.36 km) upstream of its mouth.

=== Tributaries ===
White Deer Creek has five named tributaries: Lick Run, Mile Run, Sand Spring Run, Cowbell Hollow, and Tunis Run. Lick Run joins White Deer Creek 10.77 miles (17.33 km) upstream of its mouth and drains an area of 2.10 square miles (5.4 km^{2}). Mile Run joins White Deer Creek 11.82 miles (19.02 km) upstream of its mouth and drains an area of 1.57 square miles (4.1 km^{2}). Sand Spring Run joins the creek 12.48 miles (20.08 km) upstream of its mouth and drains an area of 4.94 square miles (12.8 km^{2}). Cowbell Hollow joins the creek 13.58 miles (21.85 km) upstream of its mouth and its watershed has an area of 0.26 square miles (0.67 km^{2}), making it the smallest named tributary by that measure. Tunis Run joins White Deer Creek 25.62 miles (41.23 km) upstream of its mouth and drains an area of 1.43 square miles (3.7 km^{2}).

== Hydrology ==
Some reaches of White Deer Creek are not designated as impaired waterbodies. However, several miles in the creek's watershed are impaired. In one reach, the creek is impaired by habitat alterations due to hydromodification; in the other impaired reach, it is impaired by mercury in the water column from an unknown source.

In several dozen measurements in the 1970s and 2010s, the discharge of White Deer Creek ranged from 3.0 to 169 cubic feet per second (0.085 to 4.786 m^{3}/s). Between water years 1969 and 1973, the average annual discharge ranged from 39.9 cubic feet per second (1.13 m^{3}/s) in water year 1969 to 113.0 cubic feet per second (3.20 m^{3}/s) in water year 1972, with an average of 73.06 cubic feet per second (2.069 m^{3}/s).

In 1975 and 1976, the turbidity of White Deer Creek near White Deer ranged from 1 to 2 Jackson Turbidity Units. The creek carries high levels of sediment. In the 1970s and 2010s, the creek's specific conductance ranged from 32 to 400 micro-siemens per centimeter at 25 °C (77 °F). The pH of the creek ranged from 6.7 to 8.7 and the water hardness concentration ranged from less than 10 milligrams per liter (0.0100 oz/cu ft) to 170 milligrams per liter (0.17 oz/cu ft). The dissolved oxygen concentration ranged from 8.2 to 15.7 milligrams per liter (0.0082 to 0.0157 oz/cu ft).

In the 1970s and 2010s, the carbon dioxide concentration of White Deer Creek near White Deer ranged from 0.2 to 5.6 milligrams per liter (0.00020 to 0.00559 oz/cu ft). The organic carbon concentration ranged between 0.7 and 5.1 milligrams per liter (0.00070 and 0.00509 oz/cu ft). The nitrogen concentration ranged from less than 0.25 milligrams per liter (0.00025 oz/cu ft) to 1.2 milligrams per liter (0.0012 oz/cu ft). The phosphorus concentration ranged from less than 0.010 milligrams per liter (1.00×10^{−5} oz/cu ft) to 0.142 milligrams per liter (0.000142 oz/cu ft). The sulfate concentration ranged from 3.5 to 77.5 milligrams per liter (0.0035 to 0.0774 oz/cu ft) in the creek's filtered water, while the concentration of chloride ranged from 2.0 to 24.6 milligrams per liter (0.0020 to 0.0246 oz/cu ft). In the 2010s, the arsenic concentration was less than 3 micrograms per liter (3.0×10^{−6} oz/cu ft) all times it was measured, while the boron concentration was less than 200 micrograms per liter (0.00020 oz/cu ft) and the selenium concentration was less than 7 micrograms per liter (7.0×10^{−6} oz/cu ft). The ammonia concentration ranged from less than 0.026 milligrams per liter (2.6×10^{−5} oz/cu ft) to 0.296 milligrams per liter (0.000296 oz/cu ft).

In the 2010s, the concentrations of recoverable sodium in White Deer Creek near White Deer ranged from 1.6 to 11.1 milligrams per liter (0.0016 to 0.0111 oz/cu ft), while the potassium concentration was less than 1 milligram per liter (0.00100 oz/cu ft) all times it was measured. The magnesium and calcium concentrations ranged from 1.0 to 10.7 milligrams per liter (0.00100 to 0.01069 oz/cu ft) and 2.7 to 50.2 milligrams per liter (0.0027 to 0.0501 oz/cu ft). The concentration of recoverable strontium ranged from 20 to 30 micrograms per liter (2.0×10^{−5} to 3.0×10^{−5} oz/cu ft) and measurable barium concentrations were observed. The concentration of recoverable manganese ranged from less than 2 micrograms per liter (2.0×10^{−6} oz/cu ft) to 50 micrograms per liter (5.0×10^{−5} oz/cu ft) all the times the concentration was quantified, while the recoverable iron concentration ranged from less than 10 micrograms per liter (1.00×10^{−5} oz/cu ft) to 1,230 micrograms per liter (0.00123 oz/cu ft). The concentrations of recoverable nickel, copper, and cadmium were less than 4 micrograms per liter (4.0×10^{−6} oz/cu ft) most or all of the times they were measured. The concentration of recoverable zinc ranged from less than 5 micrograms per liter (5.0×10^{−6} oz/cu ft) to 20 micrograms per liter (2.0×10^{−5} oz/cu ft), not counting several times when its presence was observed, but not quantified. The concentration of recoverable aluminum ranged from less than 10 micrograms per liter (1.00×10^{−5} oz/cu ft) to 1,300 micrograms per liter (0.0013 oz/cu ft), not counting several times when its presence was observed, but not quantified.

== Geography, geology, and climate ==
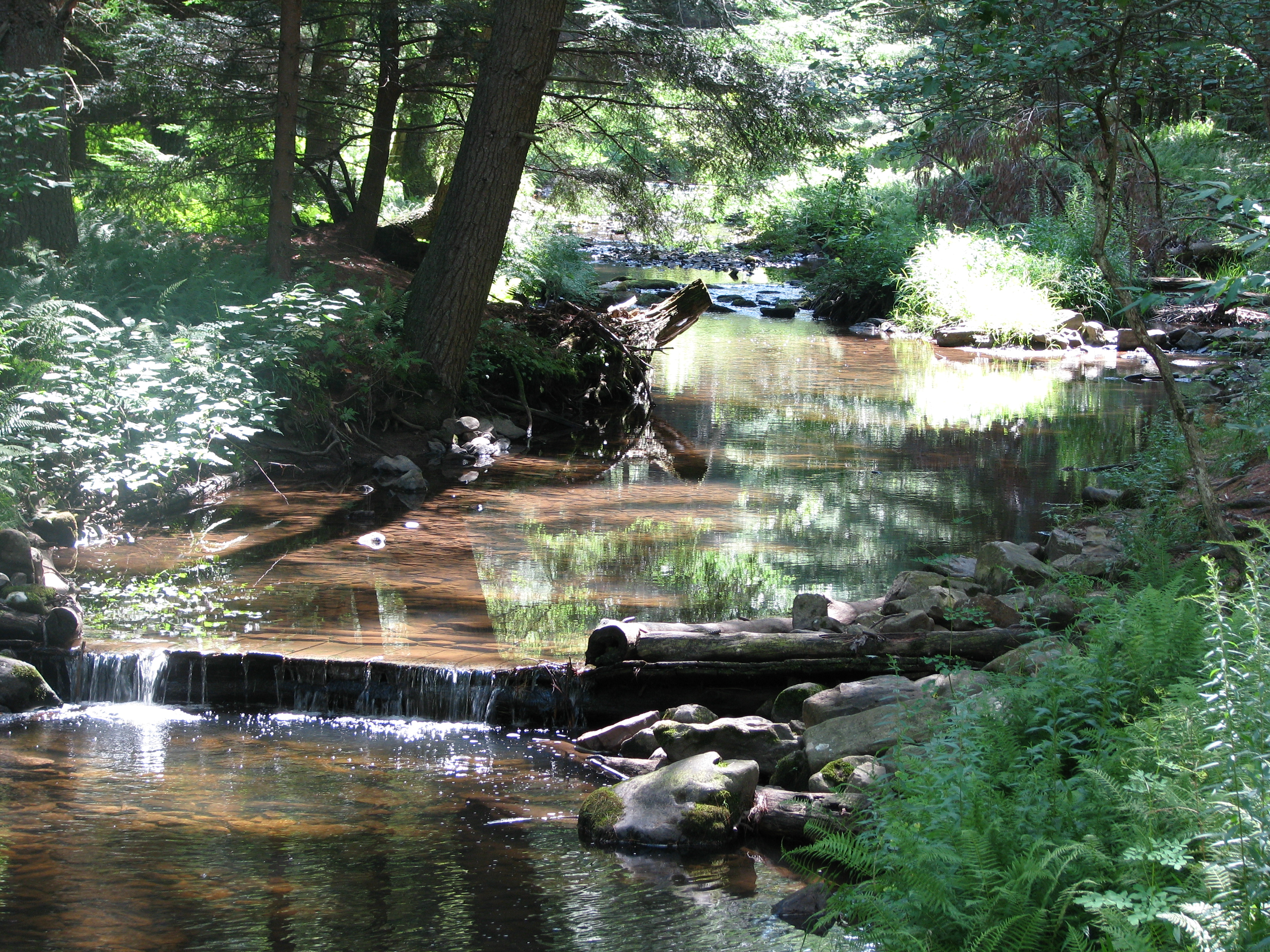
White Deer Creek in McCalls Dam State Park

The elevation near the mouth of White Deer Creek is 446 feet (136 m) above sea level. The elevation of the creek's source is 1,872 feet (571 m) above sea level. White Deer Creek is relatively small, with a width of about 20 feet (6.1 m). The gradient of the creek upstream of the water supply dam on it ranges from 16 to 160 feet per mile (3.0 to 30.3 m/km), with an average of 40 feet per mile (7.6 m/km).

The valleys in the watershed of White Deer Creek are generally narrow. At some points, the valley walls rise steeply almost immediately from the creek's streambanks, which made the construction of roads through those areas difficult. However, in other areas, the valley is approximately 1,000 feet (300 m) wide.

White Deer Creek is a freestone stream. There are numerous strainers on White Deer Creek, to the point where the creek was described as "one of the most tree-infested and strainer-struck streams in the state". The creek's channel is also braided in some reaches. The creek flows through a very narrow valley and, in its upper reaches, is small for a canoeing stream. The community of White Deer experiences significant flooding problems because it is on the creek's floodplain, and because of the creek's narrow valley. The topography of the watershed is mountainous, with the creek's narrow valley being surrounded by steep ridges. The watershed was described as rugged, with sharp topographical features, in a 1938 report. The watershed is not affected by glaciation, as it is approximately 30 miles (48 km) south of the glacial moraine.

Although there are several camps along White Deer Creek, the area in its vicinity is not heavily developed until the creek's final few miles. There are a number of long, rocky rapids on the creek near Nittany Mountain, and the whitewater on the creek only ends in its lowermost reaches. A 4-foot (1.2 m) dam for water supply is located on White Deer Creek a few miles upstream of Interstate 80. The creek experiences erosion and instability at its mouth.

The channel of White Deer Creek is sinuous and flows through rock formations consisting of sandstone. The creek has a rocky streambed and high banks. The floodplain of the creek is one of the more prominent floodplains in Union County. There are numerous riffles on the creek where it flows past boulders.

In the lowlands of the White Deer Creek watershed, coarse-grained soils are predominant; sand, silt, gravel, and boulders are common. Clay occurs in a few areas near old dams. The sides of the valley are covered by sandstone and dolomite outcrops, and dolomite boulders, while the ridgetops are composed of weather-resistant sandstone.

The average annual rate of precipitation in the watershed of White Deer Creek is 35 to 45 inches (89 to 114 cm). In several dozen measurements in the 1970s and 2010s, the water temperature of the creek near White Deer ranged from −0.1 to 23.1 °C (31.8 to 73.6 °F). The creek maintains cool temperatures even when other freestone streams become to warm or shallow to fish in. However, it does tend to become relatively shallow in the springtime. The creek remains clear except after major storms.

== Watershed ==
The watershed of White Deer Creek has an area of 45.1 square miles (117 km^{2}). The mouth of the creek is in the United States Geological Survey quadrangle of Milton. However, its source is in the quadrangle of Loganton. The creek also passes through the quadrangles of Williamsport SE and Carroll. It generally flows in an easterly direction. Its mouth is located within 1 mile (1.6 km) of White Deer. The watershed is mostly situated in eastern Centre County and northern Union County. The creek is one of the major streams in Union County. The area of the watershed upstream of the water supply dam has an area of 37.83 square miles (98.0 km^{2}).

White Deer Creek flows alongside Interstate 80 in northern Union County for a substantial portion of its length, although the highway can rarely be seen or heard from the creek in most reaches. At the United States Geological Survey stream gage on White Deer Creek near White Deer, the creek drains an area of 40 square miles (100 km^{2}).

The White Deer District of the Pennsylvania-American Water Company, which serves 41,000 people in 15 municipalities in Northumberland County and Union County, uses a small dam on White Deer Creek as one of its main water supplies. Upstream of this dam, more than 99 percent of the watershed of the creek is forested. The Pennsylvania Bureau of Forestry owns the vast majority of the land in the creek's watershed upstream of the dam. However, the Pennsylvania Bureau of State Parks owns two small tracts and the Pennsylvania-American Water Company owns the area around the dam. The remainder of the land in this part of the watershed is owned by the Pennsylvania Department of Transportation. However, there is land devoted to agriculture in the area between White Deer Creek, Interstate 80, and US Route 15.

An overhead power line, a compressed natural gas pipeline, on-lot wastewater systems, and unpaved roads are present in the watershed of White Deer Creek. These are considered by the Pennsylvania-American Water Company to be potential sources of contamination to its water supply on the creek. As of 1993, there is a 100-foot (30-meter) selective logging zone on both sides of the creek in state forest lands.

== History ==
White Deer Creek was entered into the Geographic Names Information System on August 2, 1979. Its identifier in the Geographic Names Information System is 1191267. The creek is also known as Whitedeer Creek or South Branch White Deer Creek. These variant names appear in David B. Stevenson's 1969 master's thesis Place Names of Centre County Pennsylvania: A Geographical Analysis.

White Deer Creek's name comes from the Delaware word Woap'-achtu-hanne, meaning "white-deer stream". White Deer Creek appears on Scull's map in 1759 as Opaghtanoten and White Flint Creek.

The widow Catharine Smith began building a sawmill and a gristmill on White Deer Creek in 1774 and completed the construction in 1775. Smith established a boring mill at the mouth of White Deer Creek in the summer of 1776. The mill was used to make gun barrels for the Continental Army during the American Revolutionary War. An early settlement near the creek was destroyed by the British in 1777.

A state road running between Bellefonte and the mouth of White Deer Creek was constructed in 1824. Numerous mills had been constructed on the creek by the 1830s. These included Daniel Caldwell's stone gristmill, fulling mill, sawmill, carding machine, and distillery. In 1845, G.W. Green, Joseph Green, and David Howard established a pig iron furnace whose blast was powered by a race on the creek. John McCall, a native of Scotland, established a camp in the upper reaches of the watershed by 1860 and used splash dams to float the logs downstream to his mill. Ario Pardee later established a system to float them all the way to the mouth of White Deer Creek, where they were ferried to Watsontown for milling.

Near the turn of the 20th century, the Kulp Lumber Mill processed millions of board feet of timber taken from White Deer Creek and Spruce Run via a narrow gauge railway system. In the early 1900s, the main industry in the watershed of White Deer Creek was agriculture. Major communities in the watershed during this time period included Whitedeer, which had a population of 136. The White Deer and Loganton Railroad also followed the creek throughout its length. It was incorporated by the White Deer Lumber Company on April 26, 1906 and ran as far as Loganton, a distance of 24 miles (39 km). The tracks were removed in 1916. The Lewisburg and Tyrone Railroad also had spurs reaching into the upper reaches of the creek's watershed. White Deer Creek was used as a water supply by the White Deer Mountain Water Company during this time period, as well.

A steel stringer/multi-beam or girder bridge carrying T-514 over White Deer Creek was built 1.5 miles (2.4 km) north of White Deer in 1915 and repaired in 1992. This bridge is 65.9 feet (20.1 m) long and it is possible for it to be listed on the National Register of Historic Places. A two-span prestressed box beam or girders bridge carrying State Route 1003 over the creek was built in 1958 and repaired in 2011. This bridge is 86.9 feet (26.5 m) long and is 3 miles (4.8 km) west of White Deer. A three-span prestressed stringer/multi-beam or girder bridge carrying US Route 15 over the creek was built in 1963 in White Deer and repaired in 2010; this bridge is 228.0 feet (69.5 m) long. A prestresed box beam or girders bridge carrying State Route 1011 over the creek in White Deer was built in 1963 and is 89.9 feet (27.4 m) long. Two bridges carrying Interstate 80 over the creek were built 5 miles (8.0 km) west of White Deer in 1970; both were three-span prestressed stringer/multi-beam or girder bridges with lengths of 136.2 feet (41.5 m). One was repaired in 1994 and the other in 1999. A two-span steel stringer/multi-beam or girder bridge was built across the creek 0.2 miles (0.32 km) northeast of White Deer in 1974 and is 68.9 feet (21.0 m) long.

The White Deer Creek Restoration Committee, which was established to study instability problems for White Deer Creek and potential solutions, received a $5275 Growing Greener grant in 2000.

== Biology ==
The drainage basin of White Deer Creek is designated as a High-Quality Coldwater Fishery and a Migratory Fishery. Wild trout naturally reproduce in the creek from its headwaters downstream to the White Deer Dam, a distance of 18.40 miles (29.61 km). A total of 3.1 miles (5.0 km) of the creek (from the Union County line to Cooper Mill Road) have also been stocked with brook trout and brown trout. Stocking of the stream was done as early as the 1930s. Both native brook trout and brown trout inhabit the creek.

At least one rare species has been observed in the vicinity of White Deer Creek. In the early 1900s, the land phase of the red-spotted newt was sometimes observed at the White Deer Dam. Beavers have historically inhabited the creek's watershed in large numbers, causing pollution problems. Other mammal species that have existed in the watershed include deer, bears, wildcats, and porcupines, while birds included whippoorwills and wild turkeys. Rattlesnakes and copperheads were also observed in the watershed in the 1930s.

Forests and dense areas of mountain laurel occupy most of the valley of White Deer Creek in some reaches. The stream's forested valley consists mainly of hemlock trees and mixed oak forest. The Union County Natural Areas Inventory recommended maintaining a forested riparian buffer around the creek.

The original virgin timber in the watershed of White Deer Creek was cut down in the 1890s. By the late 1930s, second-growth trees including hardwoods, hemlocks, pines, and aspens, grew in the watershed, some of them up to 1 foot (0.30 m) in diameter. However, occasional old-growth pines or oaks remained. As a 1938 report noted, rhododendrons and mountain laurel thickets also grew extremely densely in the watershed, through the vegetation became less dense at higher elevations, with only scrub oak forests on the ridgetops.

== Recreation ==
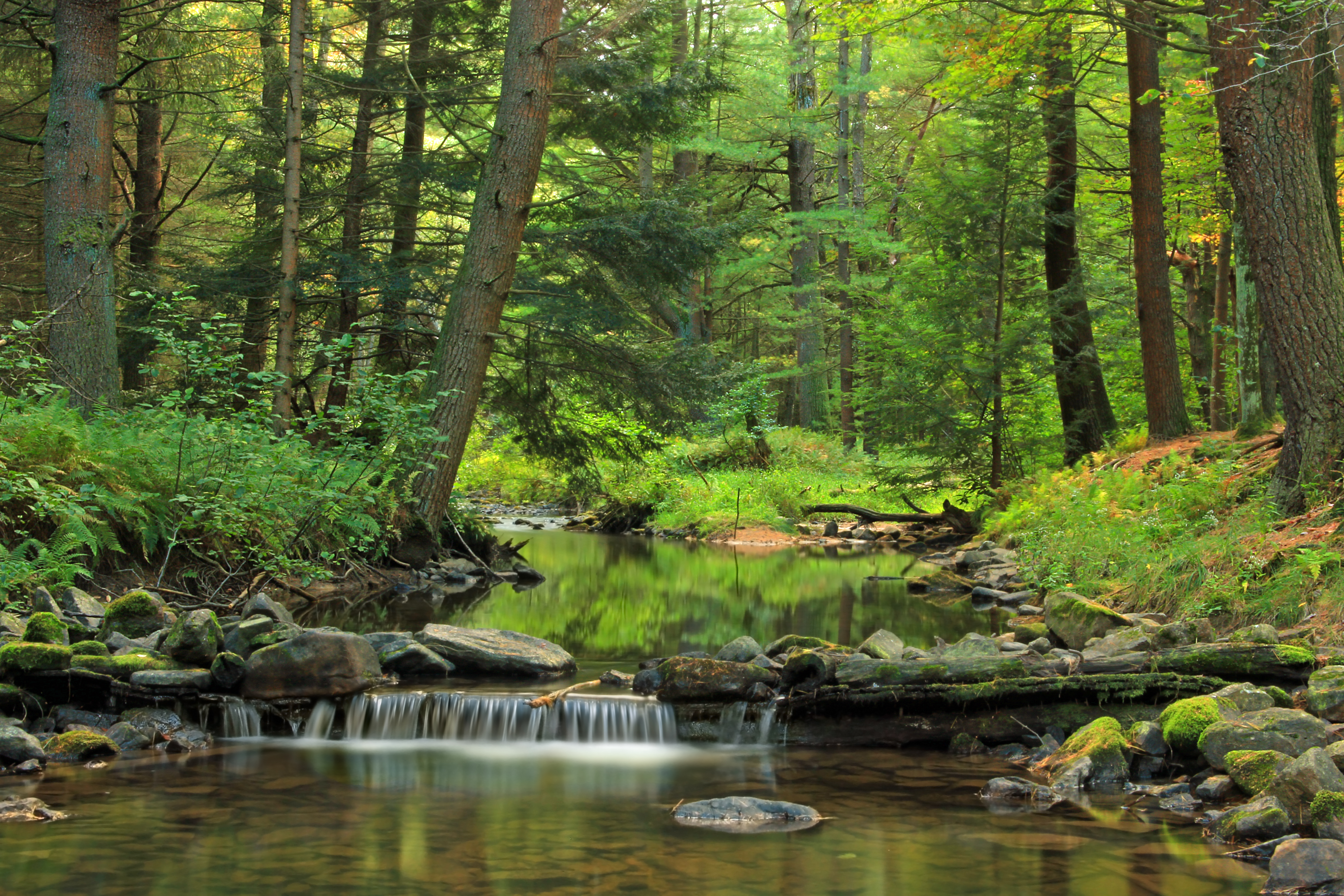
White Deer Creek in McCalls Dam State Park

The watershed of White Deer Creek has been a significant recreational area since at least the 1930s, by which time improved roads granted access to the watershed. This allowed wealthier residents of Lewisburg, Milton, Sunbury, Watsontown, and Williamsport to construct weekend/vacation cabins in the watershed. Hunting and fishing clubs were also active in the area by this time period.

At least 17.1 miles (27.5 km) of White Deer Creek is navigable by canoe during rapid spring snowmelt or within five days of heavy rain. The difficulty of the creek ranges from 1 to 3- and the scenery is described as "good" in Edward Gertler's book Keystone Canoeing.

Much of the length of White Deer Creek is in state forest lands. McCalls Dam State Park, which has an area of 8 acres (3.2 ha), is also in the vicinity of the creek. The state park is surrounded by Bald Eagle State Forest, which the creek flows through from its headwaters downstream to its lower reaches.

The scenery in the vicinity of White Deer Creek has been described as "thick and beautiful". The creek is a viable destination for angling, although angling is difficult. However, it is not nationally known, possibly due to its small size and the fact that the Delayed Harvest Fly-Fishing Only reach is in remote a location. It is classified as Approved Trout Waters by the Pennsylvania Fish and Boat Commission from Cooper Mill Road downstream to the creek's mouth. As of 2004, there is a 3.1-mile (5.0 km) long section that is Delayed Harvest Fly-Fishing Only. The creek has been described as "an excellent dry fly stream".

Mid Penn Trailblazers' marathon Dam Full crosses the headwaters of White Deer Creek at between 15.5 and 18.0 miles (24.9 and 29.0 km). The Mid State Trail also crosses the creek.

== See also ==
- Warrior Run (West Branch Susquehanna River), next tributary of the West Branch Susquehanna River going downstream
- Spring Run (West Branch Susquehanna River), next tributary of the West Branch Susquehanna River going upstream
- List of rivers of Pennsylvania
