= Sand Spring Run =

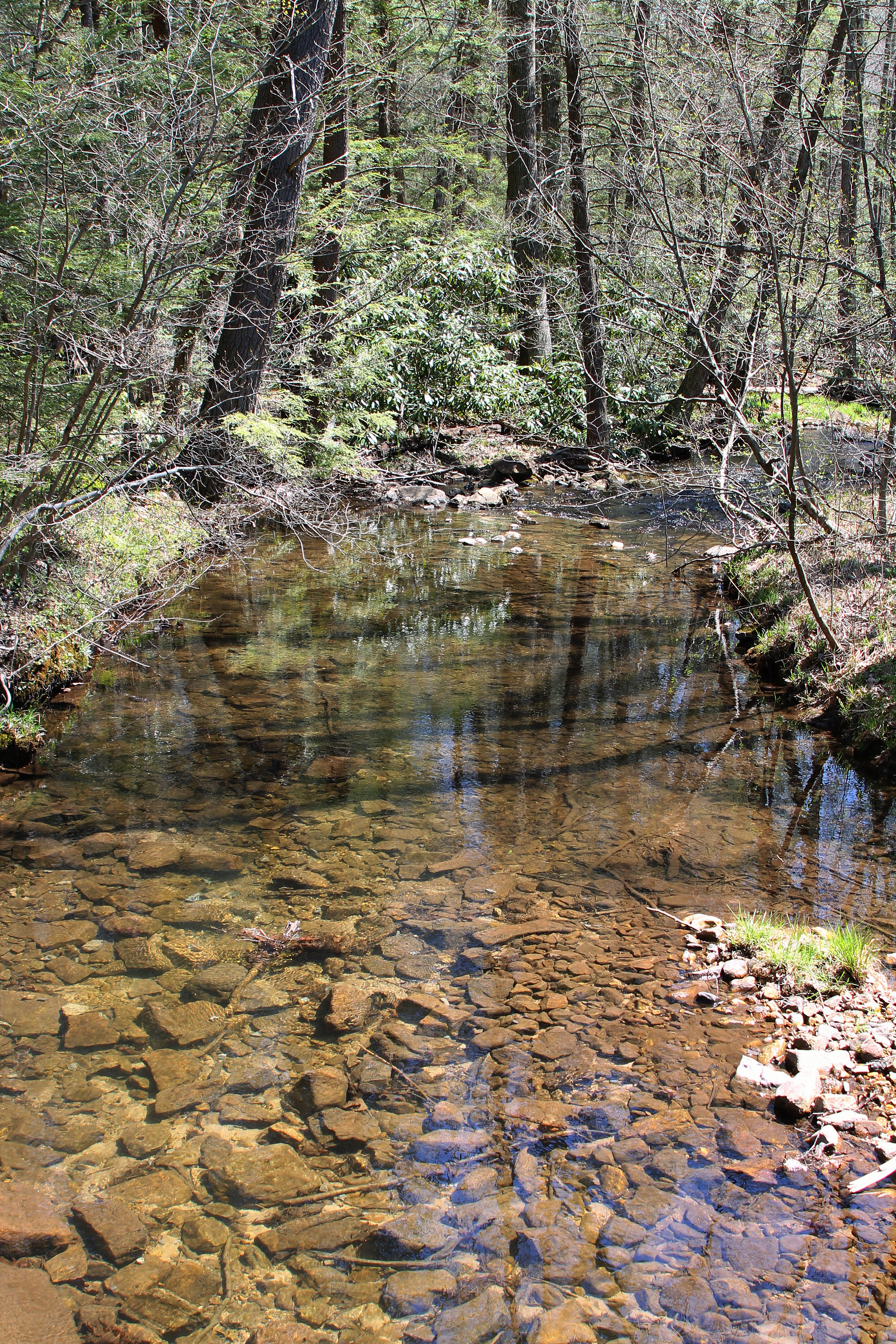
- Sand Spring Run looking downstream

Physical characteristics
- Source
  - location: shallow valley on a mountain in Lewis Township, Union County, Pennsylvania
  - elevation: 1,768 ft (539 m)
- Mouth
  - location: White Deer Creek in West Buffalo Township, Union County, Pennsylvania near White Deer
  - coordinates: 41°03′32″N 77°04′30″W
  - elevation: 1,033 ft (315 m)
- Length: 5.7 mi (9.2 km)
- Discharge
  - average: 6.06 cu ft/s (0.172 m^{3}/s)

Basin features
- Progression: White Deer Creek → West Branch Susquehanna River → Susquehanna River → Chesapeake Bay
- Tributaries
  - left: two unnamed tributaries
  - right: one unnamed tributary

Sand Spring Run is a tributary of White Deer Creek in Union County, Pennsylvania, in the United States. It is approximately 5.7 miles (9.2 km) long and flows through Lewis Township and West Buffalo Township. The watershed of the stream has an area of 4.94 square miles (12.8 km^{2}). The stream is not designated as an impaired waterbody. It is a mountainous freestone stream and is mostly in Bald Eagle State Forest.

== Course ==
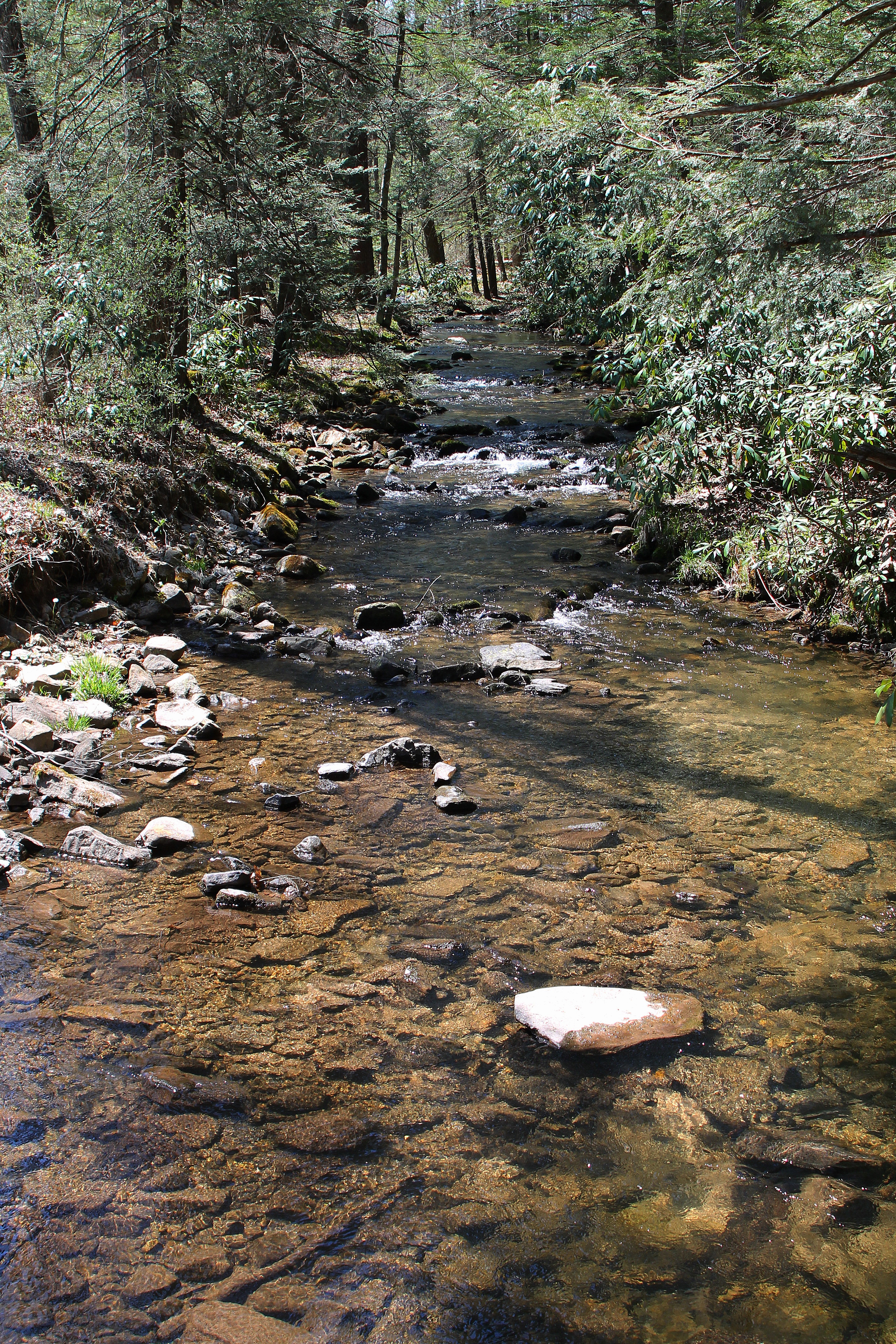
Sand Spring Run looking upstream

Sand Spring Run begins in a shallow valley on a mountain in Lewis Township. It flows east for several tenths of a mile, passing through two ponds before turning south for several tenths of a mile as its valley deepens. The stream then turns west-southwest for a few tenths of a mile before turning south-southeast. After a few tenths of a mile, it crosses Interstate 80 and turns east-northeast for a few miles, flowing alongside Interstate 80 through a valley. It then receives an unnamed tributary from the left and enters West Buffalo Township. Here, the stream continues flowing east-northeast for a few miles, receiving an unnamed tributary from the right and one from the left. Its valley then broadens and it reaches its confluence with White Deer Creek.

Sand Spring Run joins White Deer Creek 12.48 miles (20.08 km) upstream of its mouth.

== Hydrology ==
Sand Spring Run is not designated as an impaired waterbody. The average daily discharge of the stream was once found to be approximately 6.06 cubic feet per second (0.172 m^{3}/s). Between water year 1969 and water year 1980, the average annual discharge of the stream ranged from 5.37 cubic feet per second (0.152 m^{3}/s) in water year 1969 to 14.4 cubic feet per second (0.41 m^{3}/s) in water year 1978.

There is a stream gauge on Sand Spring Run near White Deer.

== Geography and geology ==
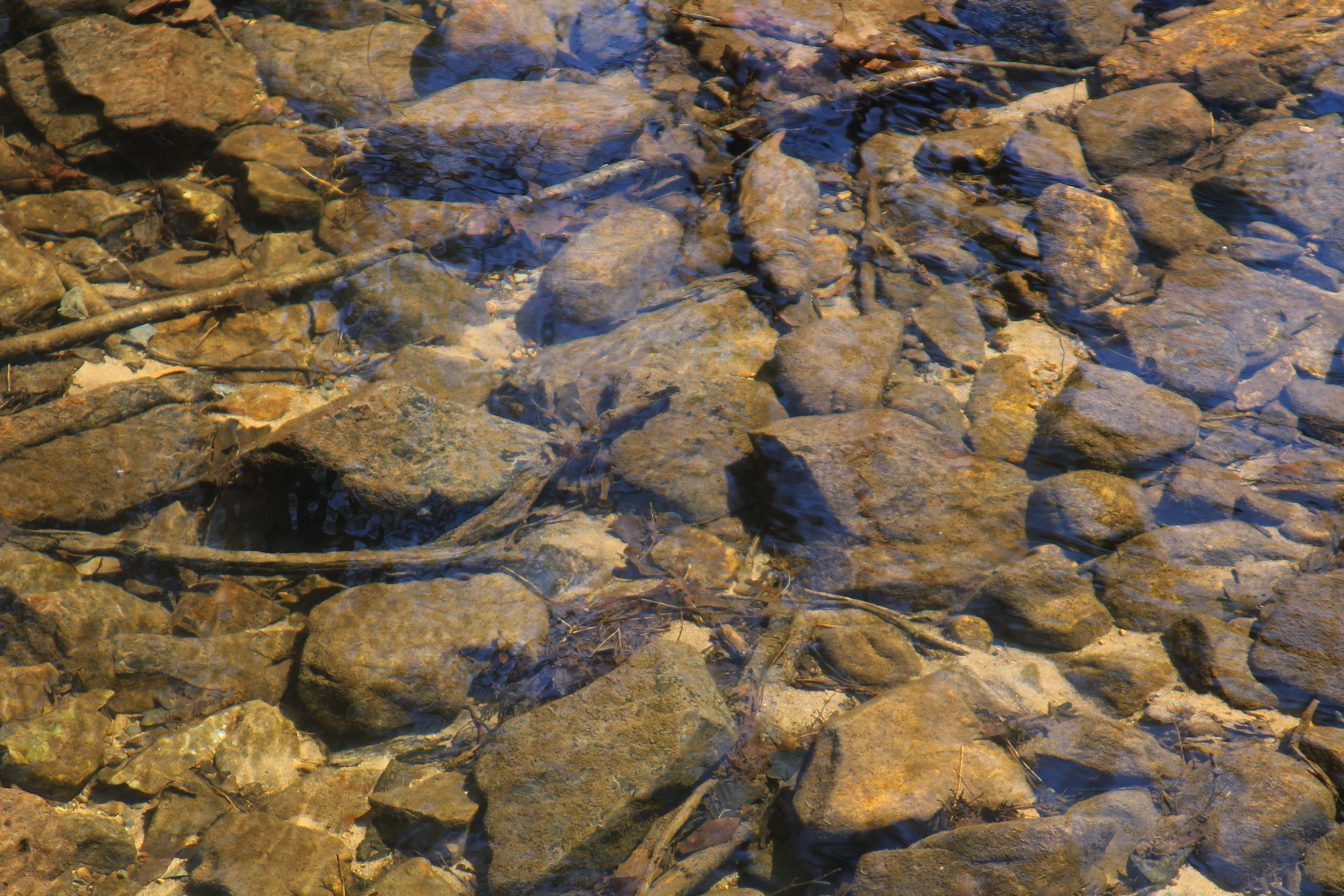
The streambed of Sand Spring Run

The elevation near the mouth of Sand Spring Run is 1,033 feet (315 m) above sea level. The elevation of the stream's source is 1,768 feet (539 m) above sea level.

Sand Spring Run is in the Ridge and Valley Freestone region. It is a mountainous freestone stream.

== Watershed ==
The watershed of Sand Spring Run has an area of 4.94 square miles (12.8 km^{2}). The mouth of the stream is in the United States Geological Survey quadrangle of Williamsport SE. However, its source is in the quadrangle of 1186931. The stream's mouth is located near White Deer.

The designated use for Sand Spring Run is aquatic life. A road known as State Route 1010 (White Deer Pike Road/Sugar Valley Narrows Road) flows alongside the stream, as does Interstate 80.

== History and recreation ==
Sand Spring Run was entered into the Geographic Names Information System on August 2, 1979. Its identifier in the Geographic Names Information System is 1186931.

The Sugar Valley Railroad, which was incorporated on October 19, 1900, passed near Sand Spring Run. However, it was abandoned by 1904 or 1905.

Virtually all of Sand Spring Run is within Bald Eagle State Forest.

== Biology ==
Wild trout naturally reproduce in Sand Spring Run in its lower 4.47 miles (7.19 km). Both brook trout and brown trout inhabit the stream.

== See also ==
- Mile Run (White Deer Creek), next tributary of White Deer Creek going downstream
- Cowbell Hollow, next tributary of White Deer Creek going upstream
- List of rivers of Pennsylvania
