= Mile Run =

The mile run is a middle-distance foot race.

Mile Run may also refer to:

- Mile Run (New Jersey), U.S.
- Mile Run (White Deer Creek tributary), Pennsylvania, U.S.
