= Dry Run (West Branch Susquehanna River tributary) =

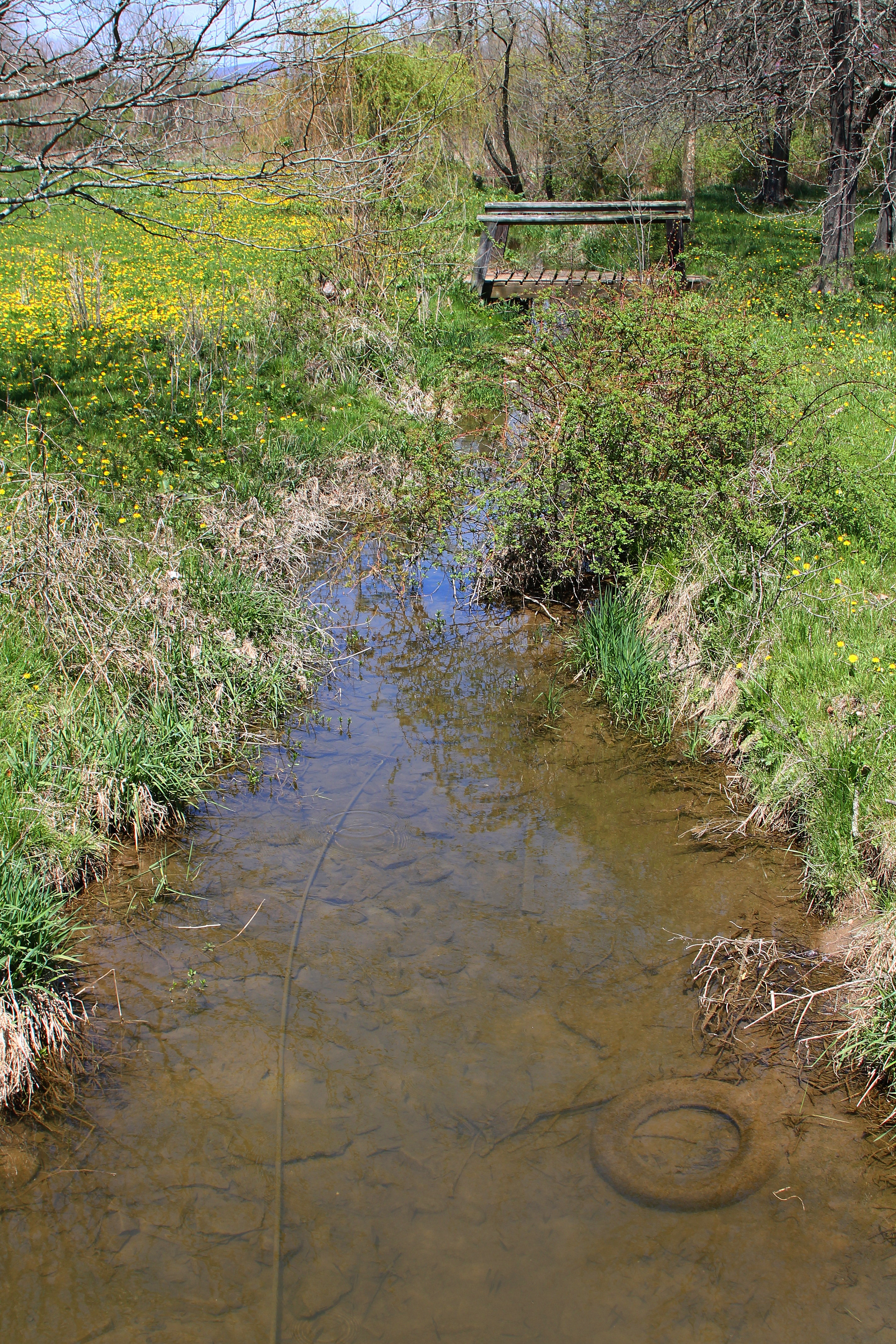
- Dry Run looking upstream

Physical characteristics
- Source
  - location: low hill in Delaware Township, Northumberland County, Pennsylvania
  - elevation: 611 ft (186 m)
- Mouth
  - location: West Branch Susquehanna River in Delaware Township, Northumberland County, Pennsylvania near Watsontown
  - coordinates: 41°05′31″N 76°52′45″W
  - elevation: 449 ft (137 m)
- Length: 4.1 mi (6.6 km)
- Basin size: 3.98 mi^{2} (10.3 km^{2})

Basin features
- Progression: West Branch Susquehanna River → Susquehanna River → Chesapeake Bay
- Tributaries
  - right: one unnamed tributary

Dry Run is a tributary of the West Branch Susquehanna River in Northumberland County, Pennsylvania, in the United States. It is approximately 4.1 miles (6.6 km) long and flows through Delaware Township. The watershed of the stream has an area of 3.98 square miles (10.3 km^{2}). The stream is impaired by sedimentation/siltation from agriculture and is a relatively small valley stream. Several bridges have been constructed across it. The stream is designated as a Warmwater Fishery and a Migratory Fishery.

== Course ==
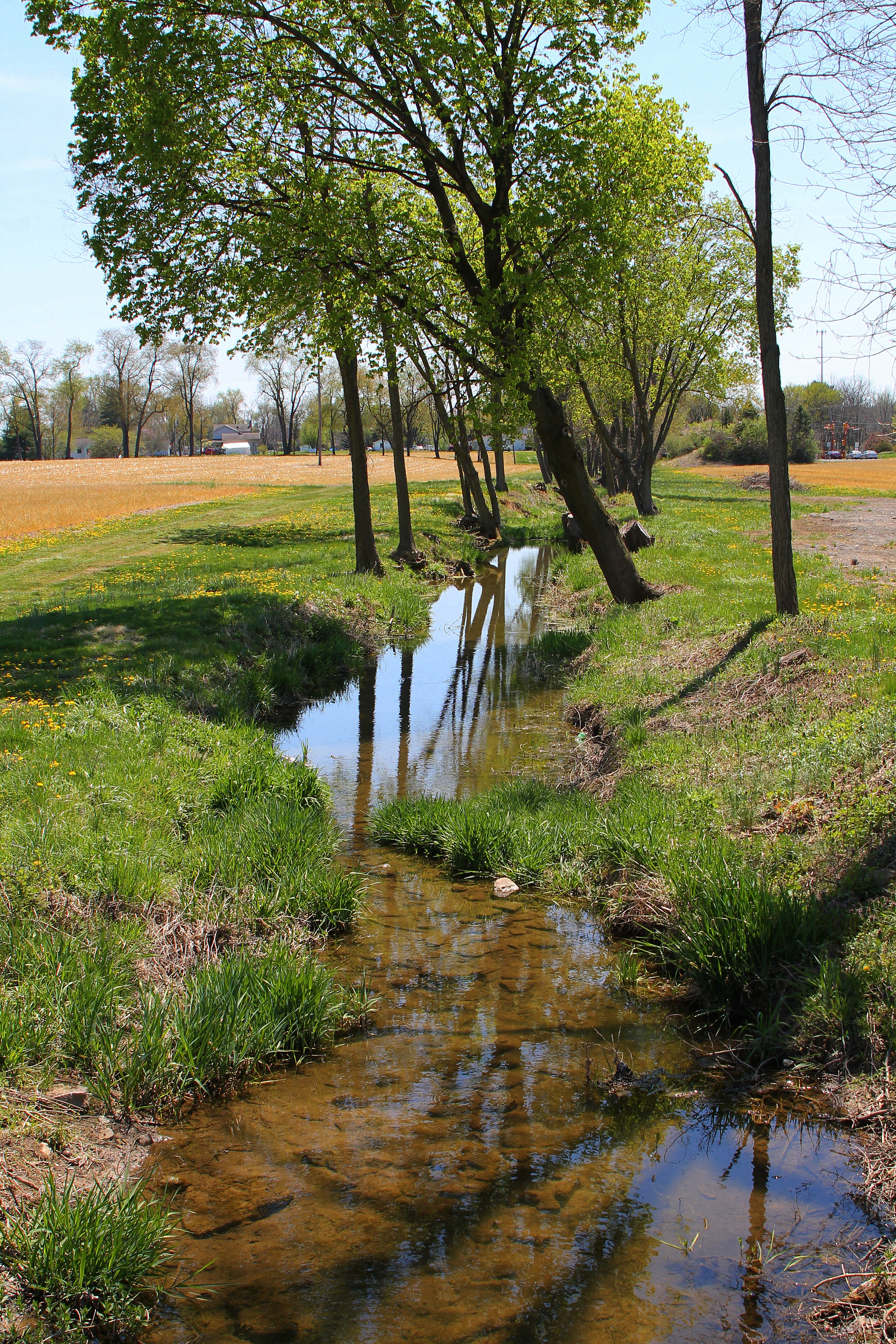
Dry Run looking downstream

Dry Run begins on a low hill in Delaware Township. It flows north-northeast for a few tenths of a mile before reaching the bottom of the hill and gradually turning west-northwest. After more than a mile, the stream receives an unnamed tributary from the right and enters the census-designated place of Dewart. In Dewart, it flows west-northwest for a few tenths of a mile before turning west-southwest for several tenths of a mile and crossing a railroad. The stream then turns south for several tenths of a mile, exiting Dewart and crossing Pennsylvania Route 44/Pennsylvania Route 405 before turning west. A short distance further downstream, it reaches its confluence with the West Branch Susquehanna River.

Dry Run joins the West Branch Susquehanna River 16.87 miles (27.15 km) upstream of its mouth.

== Hydrology ==
Dry Run is designated as an impaired waterbody. The cause of impairment is sedimentation/siltation. The likely source of impairment is agriculture.

At the point where Dry Run crosses a Conrail railroad, the stream's peak annual discharge has a 10 percent chance of reaching 1,080 cubic feet per second (31 m^{3}/s). It has a 2 percent chance of reaching 2,000 cubic feet per second (57 m^{3}/s) and a 1 percent chance of reaching 2,469 cubic feet per second (69.9 m^{3}/s). The peak annual discharge has a 0.2 percent chance of reaching 3,310 cubic feet per second (94 m^{3}/s).

At the point where Dry Run crosses Township Route 627, the stream's peak annual discharge has a 10 percent chance of reaching 960 cubic feet per second (27 m^{3}/s). It has a 2 percent chance of reaching 1,775 cubic feet per second (50.3 m^{3}/s) and a 1 percent chance of reaching 2,204 cubic feet per second (62.4 m^{3}/s). The peak annual discharge has a 0.2 percent chance of reaching 2,950 cubic feet per second (84 m^{3}/s).

== Geography and geology ==
The elevation near the mouth of Dry Run is 449 feet (137 m) above sea level. The elevation near the stream's source is 611 feet (186 m) above sea level.

Dry Run is a relatively small valley stream.

== Watershed ==
The watershed of Dry Run has an area of 3.98 square miles (10.3 km^{2}). The mouth of the stream is in the United States Geological Survey quadrangle of Allenwood. However, its source is in the quadrangle of Milton. The mouth of the stream is located within 1 mile (1.6 km) of Watsontown.

A Conrail railroad crosses Dry Run at one point. The area of the stream's watershed at this point is 3.08 square miles (8.0 km^{2}).

According to the Warrior Run Pathways Partnership, Dry Run could benefit from improved stream and watershed management practices, including the installation of riparian buffers, installing fencing, management of waste and nutrients, and reforestation. The designated use for the stream is aquatic life.

== History ==
Dry Run was entered into the Geographic Names Information System on August 2, 1979. Its identifier in the Geographic Names Information System is 1173546.

A concrete tee beam bridge carrying State Route 1005 over Dry Run was built 2 miles (3.2 km) north of Watsontown in 1948 and is 26.9 feet (8.2 m) long. A concrete channel beam bridge carrying State Route 1003 over the stream was built in 1950 and repaired in 2009. This bridge is 32.2 feet (9.8 m) and is located 1 mile (1.6 km) north of Watsontown. A prestressed box beam or girders bridge carrying Pennsylvania Route 44 across the stream was built 0.5 miles (0.80 km) north of Watsontown in 1962 and is 37.1 feet (11.3 m) long.

A bridge rehabilitation of the bridge carrying Pennsylvania Route 44 over Dry Run has been proposed for a cost of $945,000. In 2015, the Northumberland County Conservation District received a $200,000 Growing Greener grant to install animal fencing and implement streambank stabilization on Dry Run.

== Biology ==
The drainage basin of Dry Run is designated as a Warmwater Fishery and a Migratory Fishery.

As of 2015, there is a cattle operation at the headwaters of Dry Run.

== See also ==
- Spring Run (West Branch Susquehanna River), next tributary of the West Branch Susquehanna River going downriver
- Delaware Run, next tributary of the West Branch Susquehanna River going upriver
- List of rivers of Pennsylvania
