= Lick Run (White Deer Creek tributary) =

River in Pennsylvania, United States

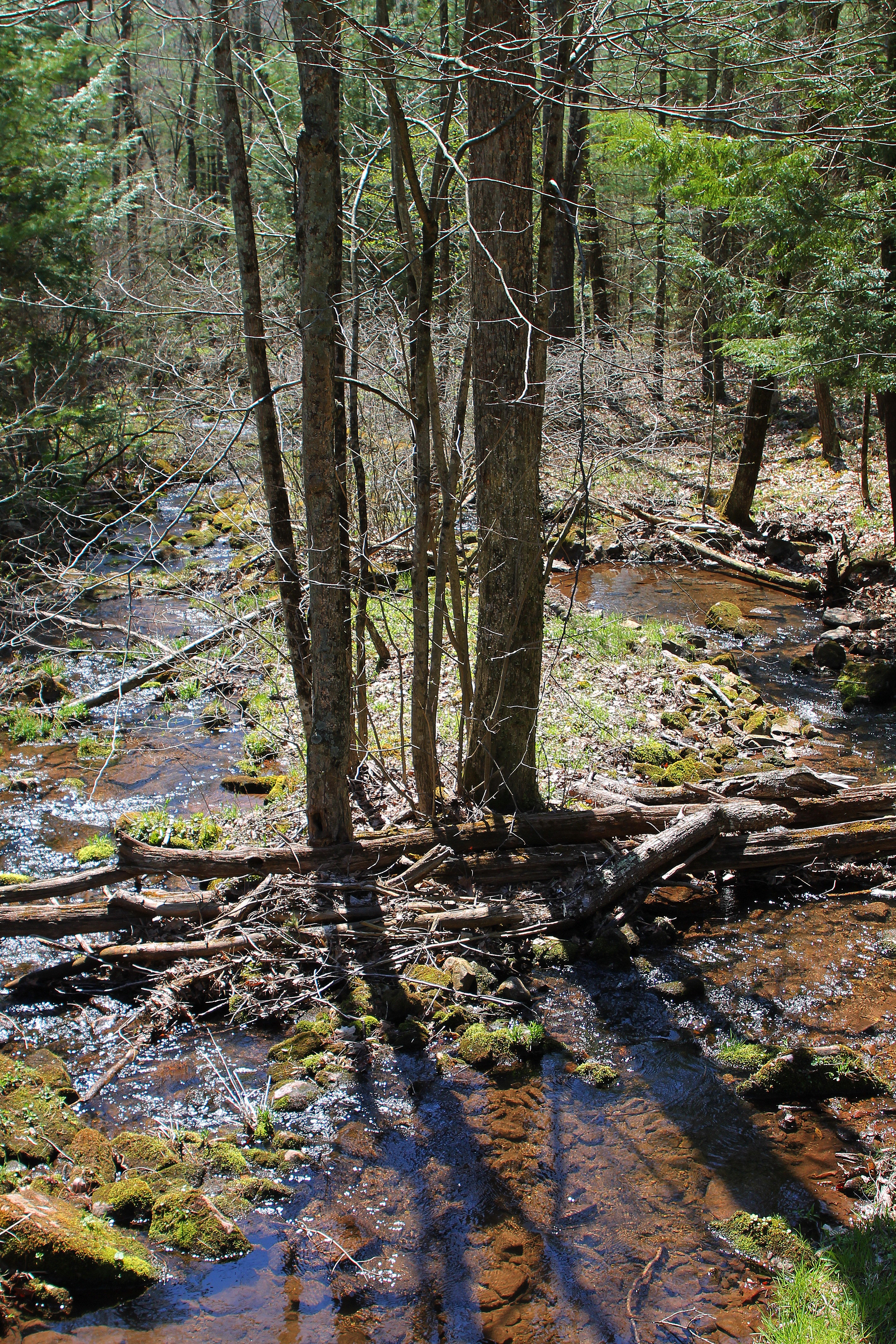
- Lick Run looking downstream

Physical characteristics
- Source
  - location: South White Deer Ridge in White Deer Township, Pennsylvania
  - elevation: 1,762 ft (537 m)
- Mouth
  - location: White Deer Creek in White Deer Township, Pennsylvania near White Deer
  - coordinates: 41°03′54″N 77°02′52″W
  - elevation: 938 ft (286 m)
- Length: 2.7 mi (4.3 km)
- Basin size: 2.10 sq mi (5.4 km^{2})

Basin features
- Progression: White Deer Creek → West Branch Susquehanna River → Susquehanna River → Chesapeake Bay
- Tributaries
  - left: one unnamed tributary

Lick Run is a tributary of White Deer Creek in Union County and Lycoming County, in Pennsylvania, in the United States. It is approximately 2.7 miles (4.3 km) long and flows through White Deer Township in Union County and Washington Township in Lycoming County. The watershed of the stream has an area of 2.10 square miles (5.4 km^{2}). The stream has one unnamed tributary. Wild trout naturally reproduce within Lick Run, and beavers began assembling a dam on it at least once.

== Course ==
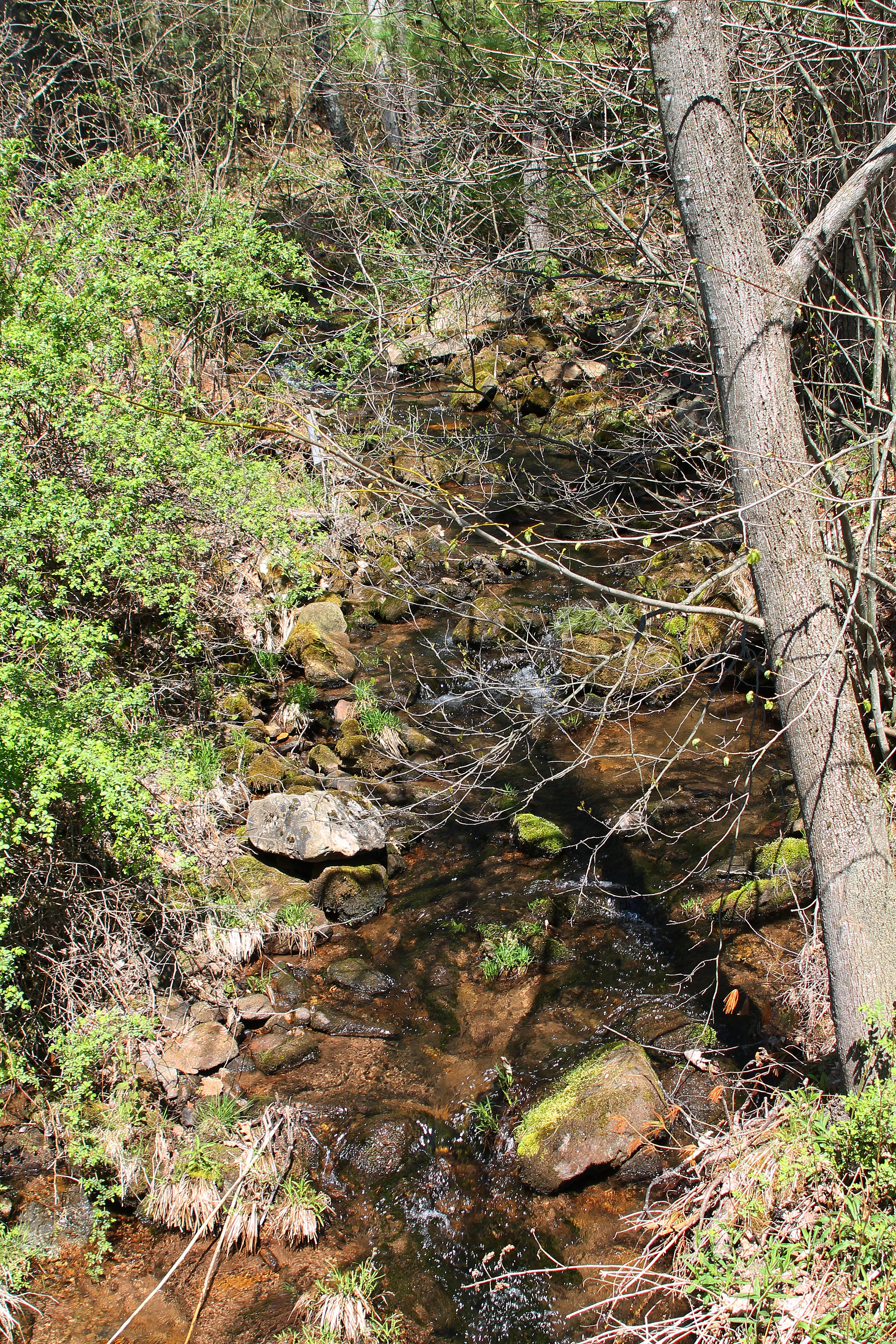
Lick Run looking upstream

Lick Run begins on South White Deer Ridge in White Deer Township, Union County. It flows west-northwest through a deep, broad valley for several tenths of a mile, entering Washington Township, Lycoming County. Here, the stream turns west-southwest for several tenths of a mile as its valley deepens and narrows. It then turns south for more than a mile, reentering White Deer Township, Union County, receiving an unnamed tributary from the left, and passing by Little Mountain. The stream then crosses Interstate 80 and continues flowing south for a few tenths of a mile before turning southeast and reaching its confluence with White Deer Creek.

Lick Run joins White Deer Creek 10.77 miles (17.33 km) upstream of its mouth.

== Geography and geology ==
The elevation near the mouth of Lick Run is 938 feet (286 m) above sea level. The elevation of the stream's source is 1,762 feet (537 m) above sea level.

== Watershed ==
The watershed of Lick Run has an area of 2.10 square miles (5.4 km^{2}). The stream is entirely within the United States Geological Survey quadrangle of Williamsport SE. Its mouth is located near White Deer.

A total of 0.89 square miles (2.3 km^{2}) of the watershed of Lick Run is in Union County.

== History ==
Lick Run was entered into the Geographic Names Information System on August 2, 1979. Its identifier in the Geographic Names Information System is 1179299.

The White Deer Valley Railroad, which was incorporated on December 11, 1900, passed in the vicinity of Lick Run. It was built in 1901 and was owned by John Duncan as a logging railroad. However, it was sold to the White Deer Lumber Company and became the White Deer and Loganton Railroad on April 17, 1906. By the early 1900s, the remains of an old log cabin had been discovered near the headwaters of Lick Run, on the road to the "Lost Valley".

== Biology ==
Wild trout naturally reproduce in Lick Run from its headwaters downstream to its mouth. In 1913, beavers began constructing a dam on the stream. However, one of the beavers was killed by a fisherman and the other left the area.

== See also ==
- Mile Run (White Deer Creek), next tributary of White Deer Creek going upstream
- List of rivers of Pennsylvania
