= Tunis Run =

Physical characteristics
- Source
  - location: valley between McCall Mountain and Hough Mountain in Miles Township, Centre County, Pennsylvania
  - elevation: 1,777 ft (542 m)
- Mouth
  - location: White Deer Creek in Miles Township, Centre County, Pennsylvania near Loganton
  - coordinates: 41°00′14″N 77°15′34″W
  - elevation: 1,506 ft (459 m)
- Length: 1.5 mi (2.4 km)
- Basin size: 1.43 sq mi (3.7 km^{2})

Basin features
- Progression: White Deer Creek → West Branch Susquehanna River → Susquehanna River → Chesapeake Bay
- Tributaries
  - left: one unnamed tributary
  - right: one unnamed tributary

Tunis Run is a tributary of White Deer Creek in Centre County, Pennsylvania, in the United States. It is approximately 1.5 miles (2.4 km) long and flows through Miles Township. The watershed of the stream has an area of 1.43 square miles (3.7 km^{2}). The stream is situated near Hough Gap and a railroad was once built near it. Wild trout naturally reproduce within it.

== Course ==
Tunis Run begins in a valley between McCall Mountain and Hough Mountain in Miles Township. It flows west for a few tenths of a mile before receiving an unnamed tributary from the left and turning north and then north-northeast, flowing through a valley between McCall Mountain and Hall Mountain. After several tenths of a mile, the stream receives an unnamed tributary from the right and turns north-northwest for a few tenths of a mile, leaving its valley. It then turns northeast. Several tenths of a mile further downstream, the stream reaches its confluence with White Deer Creek.

Tunis Run joins White Deer Creek 25.62 miles (41.23 km) upstream of its mouth.

=== Tributaries ===
Tunis Run has no named tributaries. However, it does have two unnamed tributaries. One of these joins Tunis Run 1.04 miles (1.67 km) upstream of its mouth.

== Geography and geology ==
The elevation near the mouth of Tunis Run is 1,506 feet (459 m) above sea level. The elevation of the stream's source is 1,777 feet (542 m) above sea level.

Tunis Run is situated near Hough Gap.

== Watershed ==
The watershed of Tunis Run has an area of 1.43 square miles (3.7 km^{2}). The mouth of the stream is in the United States Geological Survey quadrangle of Loganton. However, its source is in the quadrangle of Woodward. The mouth of the stream is located near Loganton.

== History ==
Tunis Run was entered into the Geographic Names Information System on August 2, 1979. Its identifier in the Geographic Names Information System is 1189919.

A short branch of a railroad was once in the vicinity of Tunis Run.

== Biology ==
Wild trout naturally reproduce in Tunis Run from its headwaters downstream to its mouth.

An unnamed tributary of Tunis Run (joining the stream 1.04 miles (1.67 km) upstream of its mouth) is being considered by the Pennsylvania Fish and Boat Commission for designation as wild trout waters. It was surveyed on June 26, 2013 and on January 20, 2015, it was listed as being considered for designation as wild trout waters.

== See also ==
- Cowbell Hollow, next tributary of White Deer Creek going downstream
- List of rivers of Pennsylvania
