= McCalls Dam State Park =

State park in Pennsylvania, United States

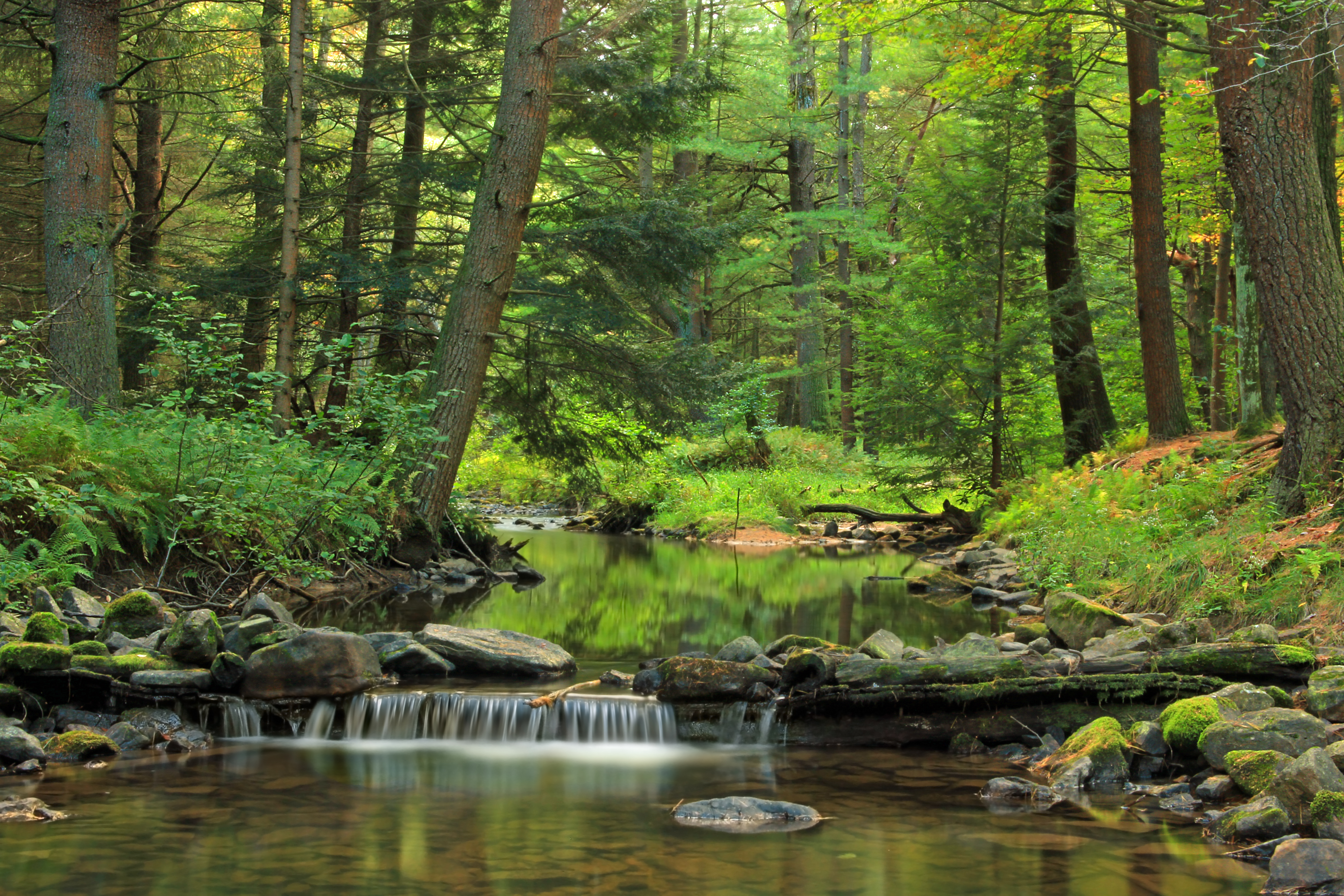

- Location within Pennsylvania Location within the United States
- Interactive map of McCalls Dam State Park
- Location: Centre County, Pennsylvania, United States
- Coordinates: 41°01′03″N 77°10′46″W
- Area: 7.5 acres (3.0 ha)
- Elevation: 1,388 feet (423 m)
- Established: 1933
- Administrator: Pennsylvania Department of Conservation and Natural Resources
- Named for: Johnny McCall
- Website: Official website
- Pennsylvania State Parks

McCalls Dam State Park is a Pennsylvania state park on 8 acres (3.2 ha) in Miles Township, Centre County, Pennsylvania in the United States. The park is in the easternmost area of the eastern tip of Centre County, south of Clinton County and north of Union County. McCalls Dam State Park is in a remote location on a gravel road between R. B. Winter State Park on Pennsylvania Route 192 and Eastville on Pennsylvania Route 880. The park can only be accessed in the winter months by snowmobiling or cross-country skiing.

McCalls Dam State Park has a small camping area and a small picnic area with a few tables and charcoal grills. There are no modern restroom facilities at the park and visitors are asked to carry out all trash as there is no trash pick up at the park.

The park is named for the splash dam which Johnny McCall built on White Deer Creek in 1850. He used the waters that flowed from the dam to power a sawmill. Sixteen years later the dam was rebuilt to provide water for a series of splash dams that were used to float white pine logs to the sawmills on the West Branch Susquehanna River at Watsontown. The park's facilities were originally constructed by the Civilian Conservation Corps in the 1933. The mill and dam are long since gone, but they are remembered along with Johnny McCall in the name of McCalls Dam State Park.
