= Delaware Run =

Coordinates: 41°05′36″N 76°52′51″W

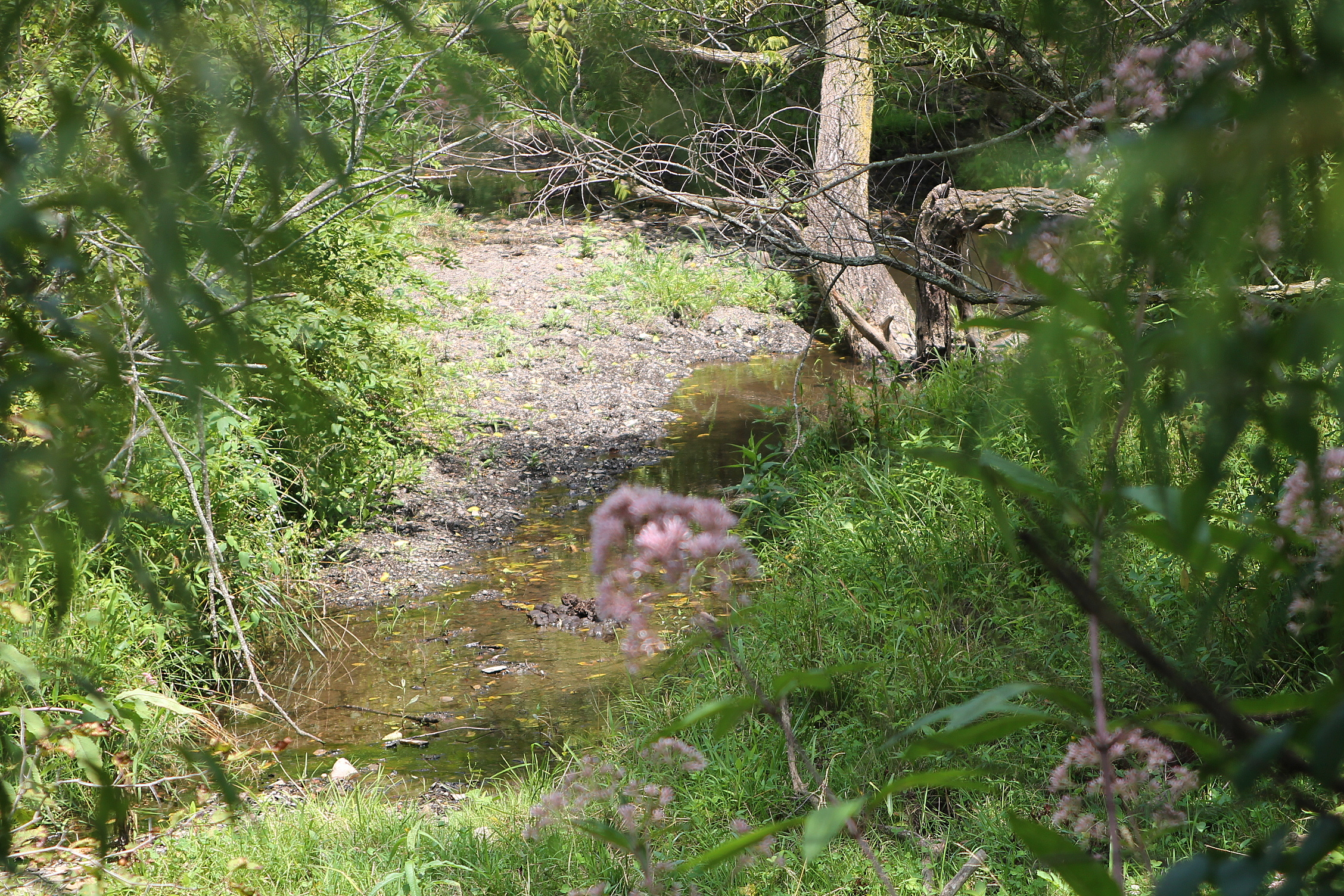
Delaware Run

Delaware Run is a tributary of the West Branch Susquehanna River in Northumberland County, Pennsylvania, in the United States. It is 7.4 miles (11.9 km) long. It flows through Delaware Township, starting in the Muncy Hills. The watershed has an area of 11.7 square miles in Northumberland and Lycoming Counties. Delaware Run was reached by Europeans as early as 1737 and an area near it settled in 1769 and the community of Dewart is near Delaware Run.

== Course ==
Delaware Run begins in Delaware Township, near the southern edge of the Muncy Hills. It flows southwards and crosses under Pennsylvania Route 54 before making a sharp turn northwest. The course gradually turns from northwest to westwards as the stream picks up two tributaries. It then turns southwest and passes by the community of Dewart and flowing under Pennsylvania Route 405. After passing Pennsylvania Route 405, the stream turns southwards, paralleling the West Branch Susquehanna River, and passes under Pennsylvania Route 44. Shortly after this, the stream reaches its confluence with the West Branch Susquehanna River.

=== Tributaries ===
Delaware Run has a large number of unnamed tributaries.

== Hydrology ==
Delaware Run has an average daily load of 15,937.4753 pounds (7,229.1172 kg) of sediment. This load would need to be reduced by 41% to meet the total maximum daily load set by the Pennsylvania Department of Environmental Protection. Out of this daily load, a total of 12,846.794 pounds (5,827.208 kg) comes from croplands. 2,305.42 pounds (1,045.72 kg) comes from stream banks and 521.369 pounds (236.489 kg) comes from hay or pastures. 126.301 pounds (57.289 kg) of sediment per day comes from low-intensity development and 103.8904 pounds (47.1239 kg) per day comes from forested lands. 19.9452 pounds (9.0470 kg) of the daily load comes from unpaved roads and 13.7532 pounds (6.2383 kg) comes from land considered "in transition" by the Pennsylvania Department of Environmental Protection.

Most of the lower reaches of Delaware Run and its tributaries are considered impaired by the Pennsylvania Department of Environmental Protection. However, some of the streams in the upper reaches of the watershed are not considered impaired. The Environmental Protection Agency considers the stream to be impaired by siltation.

Between 1991 and 2011, the average annual rainfall was 37.7 inches (96 cm). The average annual runoff during the same period was 0.13 inches (0.33 cm).

== Geology ==
The entirety watershed of Delaware Run is in the ridge and valley section of the Appalachian Mountains.

Ninety percent of the rocks in the watershed are sedimentary. These rocks include rocks from the Bloomsburg/Mifflinburg Formation, the Clinton Group, the Hamilton Group, the Onondaga/Old Port Formation, the Trimmers Rock Formation, and the Wills Creek Formation. Five percent of the rocks in the watershed are carbonate rocks, which come from the Keyser/Tonoloway Formation.

The Trimmers Rock Formation largely occurs in the northern part of the Delaware Run watershed. The Hamilton Group occurs in the central part of the watershed. The Onondaga/Old Port Formation occurs south of the Hamilton Group and the Keyser/Tonoloway Formation Undivided occurs south of the Onondaga/Old Port Formation. The Wills Creek Formation, the Bloomsburg/Mifflinburg Formation Undivided, and the Clinton Group occupy a small area in the southwestern part of the watershed. The basal outcrop of the Lower Helderberg Formation is located near the mouth of Delaware Run, although it is hidden under boulders and other debris starting south of the stream.

The Hamilton Group occupies 55% of the Delaware Run watershed and the Trimmers Rock Formation is found in 35%. The Onondaga/Old Port Formation is found in 10% of the watershed and the Keyser/Tonoloway Formation and the Wills Creek Formation each occur in 5% of the watershed. The Bloomsburg/Mifflintown Formation occurs in 4% of the watershed and the Clinton Group is found in 1%.

The main type of soil in the Delaware Run watershed is the Berks-Weikert-Bedington series, which is a silt loam with shale. It mostly is found in the upper reaches of the watershed. The Hagerstown-Edom-Washington series, the Chenango-Pope-Holly series, and the Watson-Berks-Alvira series are also found in the watershed.

The Berks-Weikert-Bedington series occurs in the northern, central, and south-central parts of the Delaware Run watershed. It makes up 60% of the watershed. The Hagerstown-Edom-Washington series, which makes up 17% of the watershed, is found in the southeastern part of the watershed and the Chenango-Pope-Holly series is found in the southwestern part of the watershed. It occurs in 20% of the watershed. The Watson-Berks-Alvira series is found in a small part (3%) of the eastern part of the watershed.

Parts of Delaware Run experience stream bank erosion.

== Watershed ==
The Delaware Run watershed has an area of 11.7 square miles. There are a total of 18.61 miles (29.95 km) of streams in the watershed of Delaware Run. One of the major highways in the watershed is Pennsylvania Route 54, which goes through the middle of it. There are also a large number of township roads in the watershed. Fifty-four percent of the land in the watershed is agricultural land and thirty-seven percent is forested land. The remaining nine percent of the land is developed. Most of the forested land is in the northern part of the watershed and much of the developed land is in the southwestern part.

Most of the watershed of Delaware Run is in Delaware Township, Northumberland County, but a small part of it is in Lycoming County.

Going from north to south, Delaware Run is the first significant stream to join the West Branch Susquehanna River in Northumberland County.

== History ==
Europeans reached Delaware Run as early as March 17, 1737. On the aforementioned day, Conrad Weiser, a German, and three Native Americans journeying to Onandago passed by the stream, pausing "within the shadow of the great pines of Delaware Run. On February 3, 1769, Lieutenant Daniel Hunsicker purchased a tract of land a short distance south of the mouth of Delaware Run, near modern-day Watsontown. The first church in Delaware Township was situated on Delaware Run in the middle of the township. It was used until 1870, when a church was built in Watsontown. The community of Dewart was established near Delaware Run.

The Dewart Covered Bridge was a single-span covered bridge with multi-king post trusses and it crossed Delaware Run. It was built in 1882 by Samuel L. Culp and was destroyed on June 22, 1972 by a tropical storm.

== Biology ==
There are no riparian buffers in some places where Delaware Run flows through agricultural lands. Livestock can freely access the stream in some locations.

== See also ==
- Dry Run (West Branch Susquehanna River), next tributary of the West Branch Susquehanna River going downriver
- White Deer Hole Creek, next tributary of the West Branch Susquehanna River going upriver
- List of rivers of Pennsylvania
