= Spring Run (West Branch Susquehanna River tributary) =

Spring Run The Gut
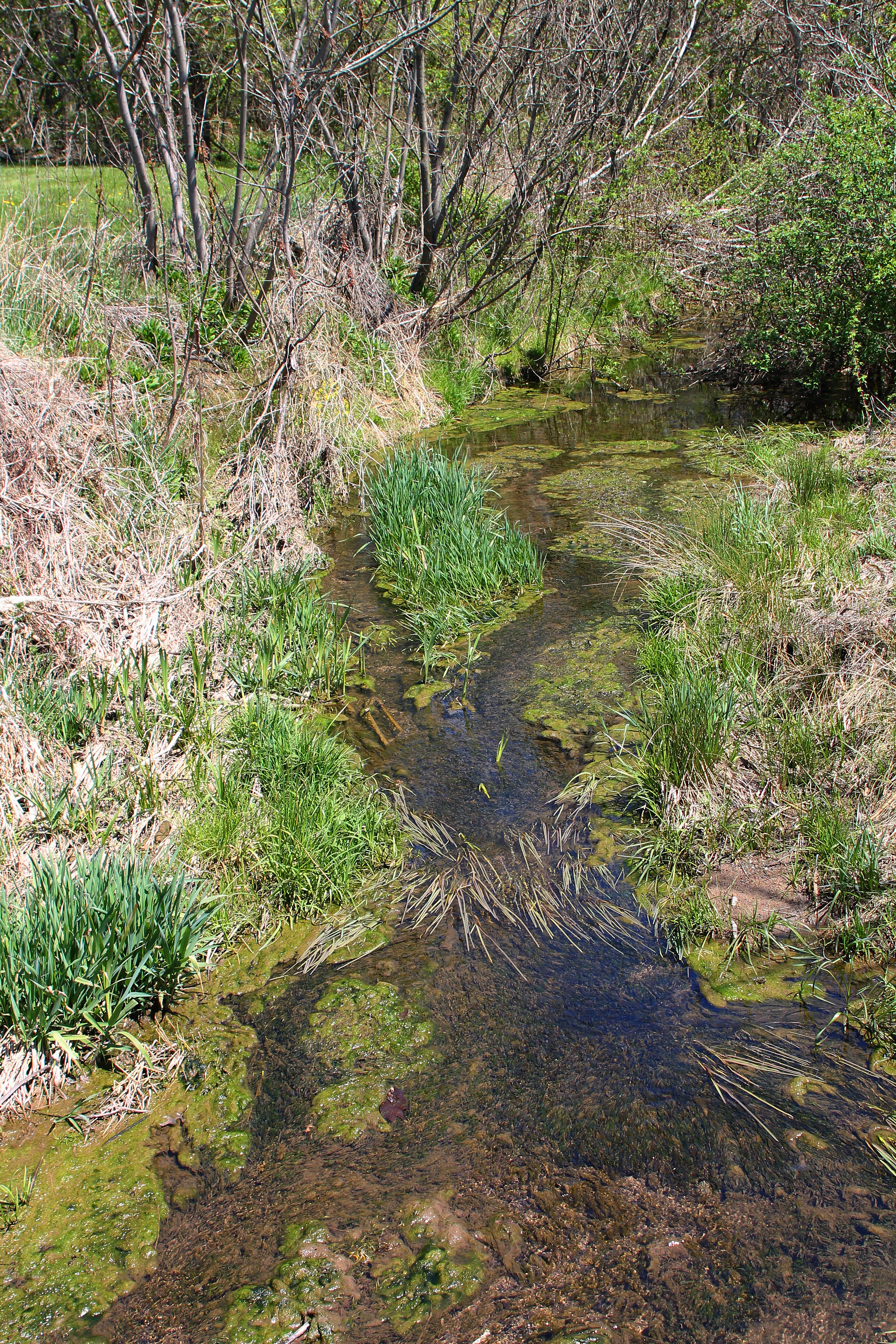
- Spring Run looking upstream

Physical characteristics
- Source
  - location: shallow valley in Delaware Township, Northumberland County, Pennsylvania
  - elevation: 551 ft (168 m)
- Mouth
  - location: West Branch Susquehanna River in Watsontown, Northumberland County, Pennsylvania
  - coordinates: 41°05′18″N 76°52′28″W
  - elevation: 449 ft (137 m)
- Length: 2.3 mi (3.7 km)
- Basin size: 1.34 mi^{2} (3.5 km^{2})

Basin features
- Progression: West Branch Susquehanna River → Susquehanna River → Chesapeake Bay

Spring Run (also known as The Gut) is a tributary of the West Branch Susquehanna River in Northumberland County, Pennsylvania, in the United States. It is approximately 2.3 miles (3.7 km) long and flows through Delaware Township and Watsontown. The watershed of the stream has an area of 1.34 square miles (3.5 km^{2}). The stream is designated as an impaired waterbody due to sedimentation/siltation and unknown causes. The stream is classified as a Warmwater Fishery.

== Course ==
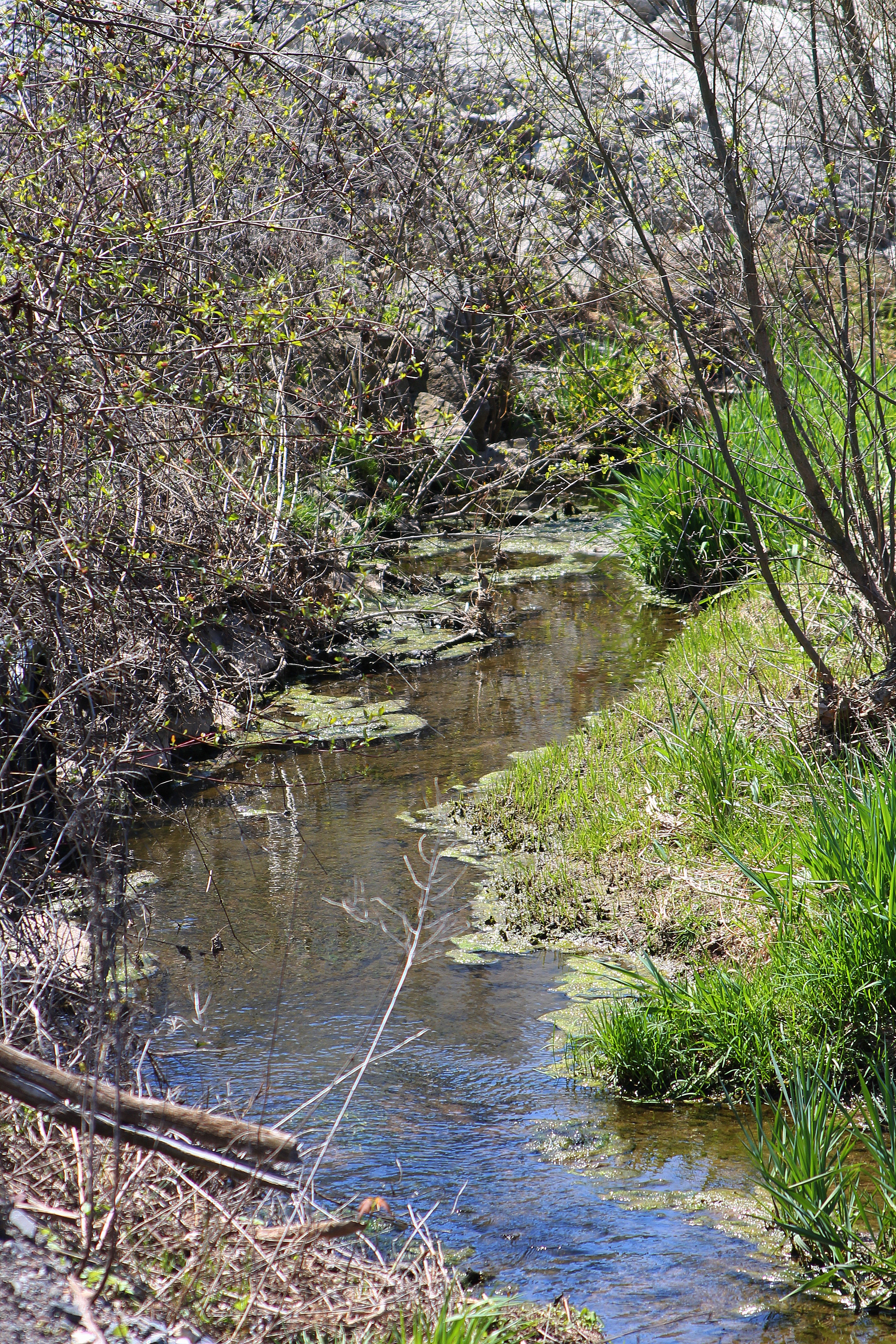
Spring Run looking downstream

Spring Run begins in a shallow valley in Delaware Township. It flows northwest for a few tenths of a mile before turning west-northwest for several tenths of a mile. The stream then heads in a west-southwesterly direction for several tenths of a mile, entering Watsontown. In Watsontown, it continues flowing west-southwest for several tenths of a mile, crossing a railroad. The stream then turns west for a few tenths of a mile, reentering Delaware Township and crossing Pennsylvania Route 405. In then turns south-southwest for a short distance, reentering Watsontown and reaching its confluence with the West Branch Susquehanna River.

Spring Run joins the West Branch Susquehanna River 16.54 miles (26.62 km) upstream of its mouth.

== Hydrology ==
Spring Run is designated as an impaired waterbody. The causes of impairment are an unknown cause and sedimentation/siltation. The probable sources of impairment are agriculture and urban runoff/storm sewers.

== Geography and geology ==
The elevation near the mouth of Spring Run is 449 feet (137 m) above sea level. The elevation of the stream's source is 551 feet (168 m) above sea level.

== Watershed ==
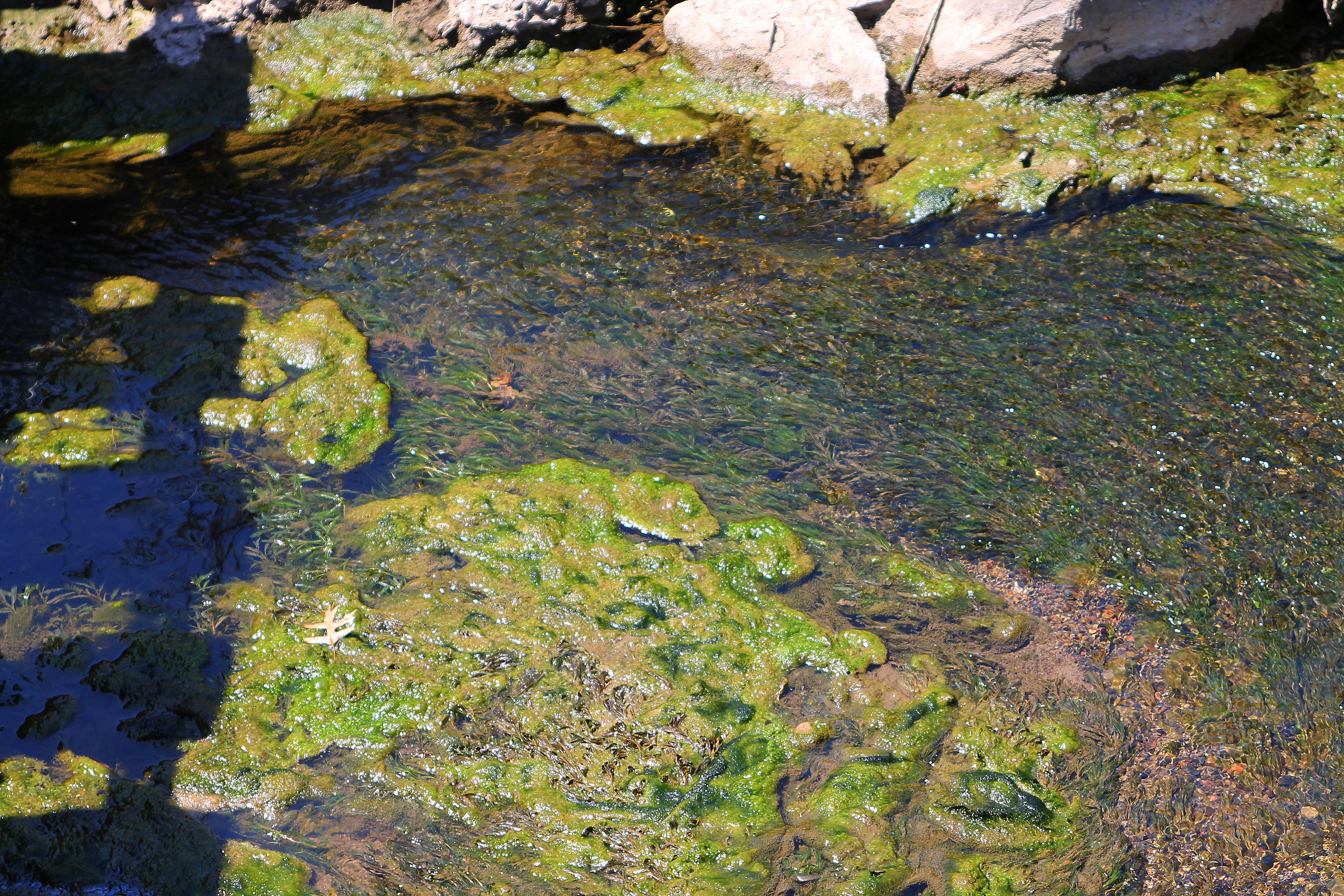
Algae and plant life in Spring Run

The watershed of Spring Run has an area of 1.34 square miles (3.5 km^{2}). The stream is entirely within the United States Geological Survey quadrangle of Milton. Its mouth is located at Watsontown.

In the early 1970s, approximately 71 acres (29 ha), or 8.56 percent of the watershed of Spring Run, was residential land. Out of this, a total of 45.75 acres (18.51 ha) were suburban, 18.00 acres (7.28 ha) were mobile homes, and 7.35 acres (2.97 ha) were rural non-farm areas. A total of 3.24 acres (1.31 ha), or 0.39 percent of the stream's watershed, was commercial land.

The designated use for Spring Run is aquatic life. The stream is classified as a Warmwater Fishery.

== History ==
Spring Run was entered into the Geographic Names Information System on August 2, 1979. Its identifier in the Geographic Names Information System is 1188261. The stream is also known as The Gut. This alternative name appears in various sources.

In 2015, Warrior Run Community Corp was issued a permit to construct a new pedestrian bridge over Spring Run for an existing walking trail. The proposed bridge was described as being a timber pedestrian bridge with a length of 30 feet (9.1 m). Moran Industries once applied for a permit to discharge stormwater into the stream during construction activities.

== See also ==
- White Deer Creek, next tributary of the West Branch Susquehanna River going downriver
- Dry Run (West Branch Susquehanna River), next tributary of the West Branch Susquehanna River going upriver
- List of rivers of Pennsylvania
