= Cowbell Hollow =

River in Pennsylvania, U.S.

Cowbell Hollow Cowbell Hollow Run

Physical characteristics
- Source
  - location: valley on a mountain in West Buffalo Township, Union County, Pennsylvania
  - elevation: 1,437 ft (438 m)
- Mouth
  - location: White Deer Creek in West Buffalo Township, Union County, Pennsylvania near McKean Springs
  - coordinates: 41°02′47″N 77°04′31″W
  - elevation: 1,109 ft (338 m)
- Length: 0.6 mi (0.97 km)
- Basin size: 0.26 mi^{2} (0.67 km^{2})

Basin features
- Progression: White Deer Creek → West Branch Susquehanna River → Susquehanna River → Chesapeake Bay

Cowbell Hollow (also known as Cowbell Hollow Run) is a tributary of White Deer Creek in Union County, Pennsylvania, in the United States. It is approximately 0.6 miles (0.97 km) long and flows through West Buffalo Township. The watershed of the stream has an area of 0.26 square miles (0.67 km^{2}). The stream is not designated as an impaired waterbody. Wild trout naturally reproduce within it throughout its length.

== Course ==
Cowbell Hollow begins in a valley on the southeastern edge of a mountain in West Buffalo Township. It flows east-northeast for several tenths of a mile before arriving at the bottom of the mountain and reaching its confluence with White Deer Creek.

Cowbell Hollow joins White Deer Creek 13.58 miles (21.85 km) upstream of its mouth.

== Hydrology ==
Cowbell Hollow is not designated as an impaired waterbody.

== Geography and geology ==
The elevation near the mouth of Cowbell Hollow is 1,109 feet (338 m) above sea level. The elevation of the stream's source is 1,437 feet (438 m) above sea level.

== Watershed ==
The watershed of Cowbell Hollow has an area of 0.26 square miles (0.67 km^{2}). The stream's valley is entirely within the United States Geological Survey quadrangle of Williamsport SE. The mouth of the stream is situated within 1 mile (1.6 km) of McKean Springs. The stream is in the Lower West Branch Susquehanna River drainage basin.

The designated use for Cowbell Hollow is aquatic life.

== History ==
The valley of Cowbell Hollow was entered into the Geographic Names Information System on August 2, 1979. Its identifier in the Geographic Names Information System is 1172555. The stream is an unnamed stream that take the name of the named hollow through which it flows.

Cowbell Hollow is also known as Cowbell Hollow Run.

== Biology ==
Two black bears were once shot in the valley of Cowbell Hollow in the 1800s or early 1900s. Wild trout naturally reproduce in Cowbell Hollow from its headwaters downstream to its mouth. They have been recorded doing so since at least 2003.

== See also ==
- Sand Spring Run, next tributary of White Deer Creek going downstream
- Tunis Run, next tributary of White Deer Creek going upstream
- List of rivers of Pennsylvania
