= Mile Run (White Deer Creek tributary) =

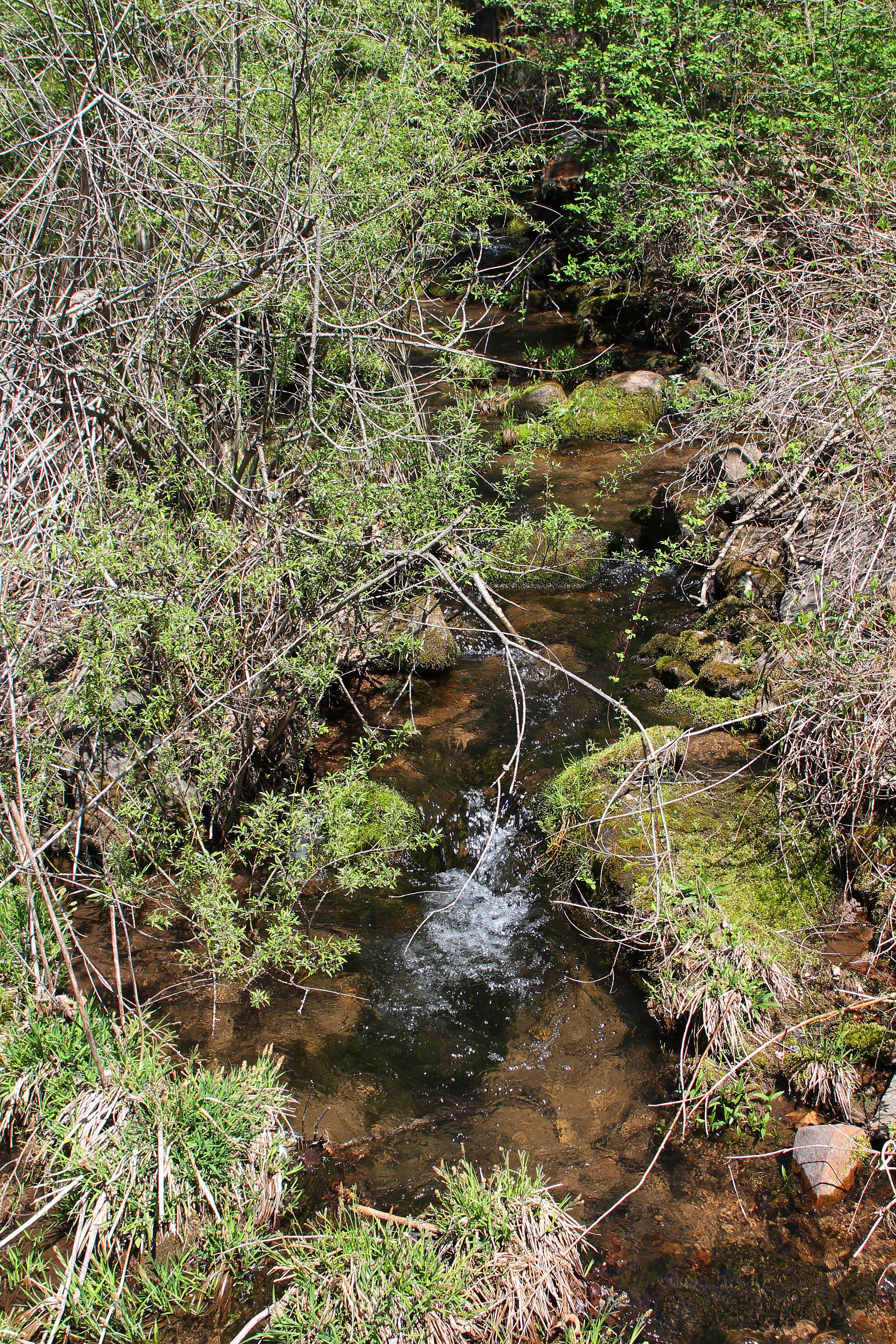
- Mile Run looking upstream

Physical characteristics
- Source
  - location: valley between Fawn Ridge and Pine Flat in West Buffalo Township, Union County, Pennsylvania
  - elevation: 1,546 ft (471 m)
- Mouth
  - location: White Deer Creek in West Buffalo Township, Union County, Pennsylvania near White Deer
  - coordinates: 41°03′47″N 77°03′58″W
  - elevation: 997 ft (304 m)
- Length: 1.9 mi (3.1 km)
- Basin size: 1.57 sq mi (4.1 km^{2})
- Discharge
  - average: 2.58 cu ft/s (0.073 m^{3}/s)

Basin features
- Progression: White Deer Creek → West Branch Susquehanna River → Susquehanna River → Chesapeake Bay
- Tributaries
  - left: two unnamed tributaries

Mile Run is a tributary of White Deer Creek in Union County, Pennsylvania, in the United States. It is approximately 1.9 miles (3.1 km) long and flows through West Buffalo Township. The watershed of the stream has an area of 1.57 square miles (4.1 km^{2}). It has been described as a "spring run". Wild trout naturally reproduce within the stream and numerous bryophyte species have been observed in its vicinity.

== Course ==
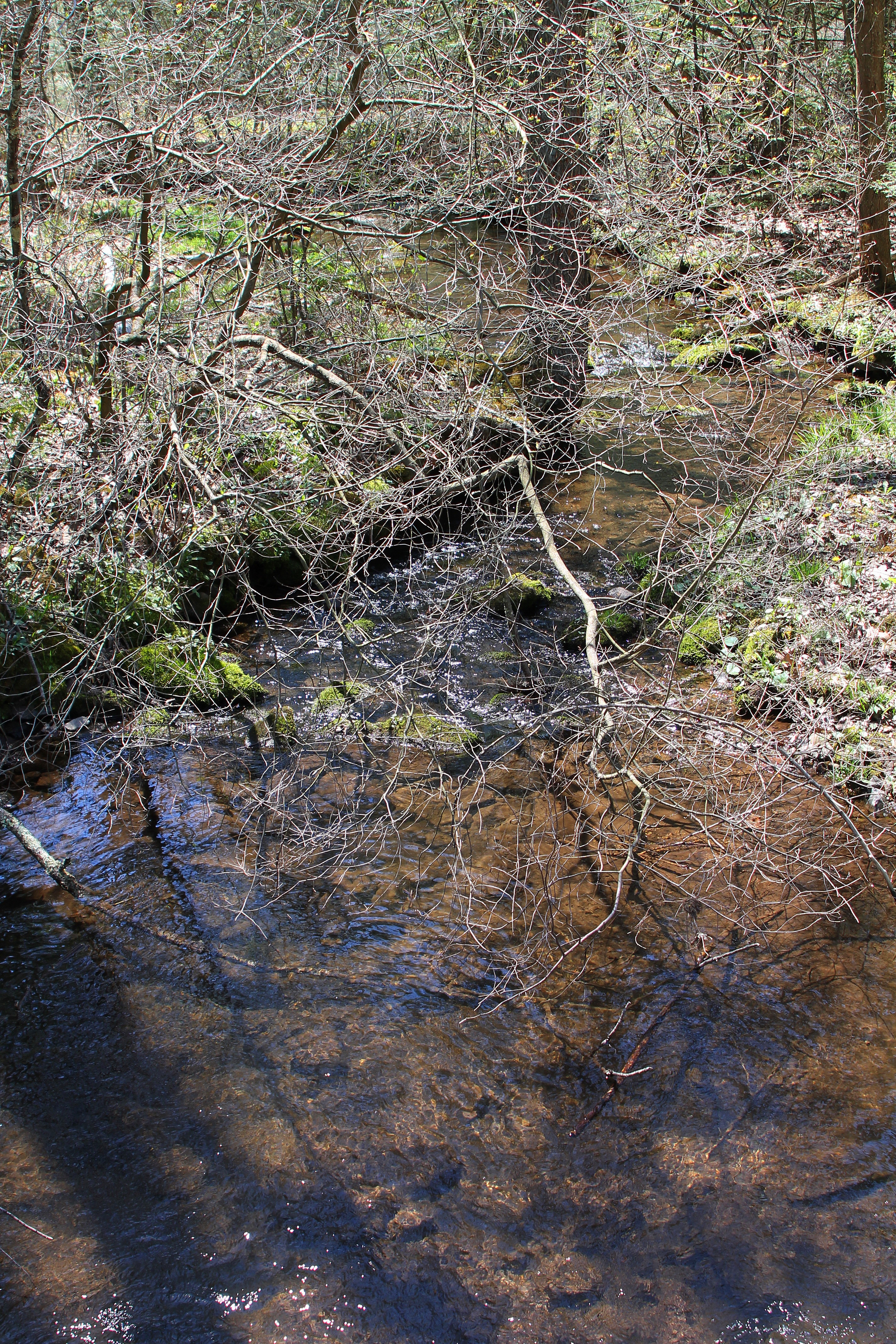
Mile Run looking downstream

Mile Run begins in a valley between Fawn Ridge and Pine Flat in West Buffalo Township. It flows east-northeast through the valley for several tenths of a mile before receiving an unnamed tributary from the left. It then gradually turns south, receiving another unnamed tributary from the left. At this point, the stream turns south for several tenths of a mile, passing between Pine Flat and Little Mountain. It then reaches the end of its valley and crosses Interstate 80 before turning east-southeast. A short distance further downstream, the stream reaches its confluence with White Deer Creek.

Mile Run joins White Deer Creek 11.82 miles (19.02 km) upstream of its mouth.

== Geography and geology ==
The elevation near the mouth of Mile Run is 997 feet (304 m) above sea level. The elevation of the stream's source is 1,546 feet (471 m) above sea level.

Mile Run has been described as a "spring run".

== Watershed and hydrology ==
The watershed of Mile Run has an area of 1.57 square miles (4.1 km^{2}). The stream is entirely within the United States Geological Survey quadrangle of Williamsport SE. Its mouth is situated near White Deer.

A total of 1.25 square miles (3.2 km^{2}) of the watershed of Mile Run is in Union County.

The average daily discharge of Mile Run is 2.58 cubic feet per second (0.073 m^{3}/s).

== History ==
Mile Run was entered into the Geographic Names Information System on August 2, 1979. Its identifier in the Geographic Names Information System is 1181098.

The White Deer Valley Railroad, which was incorporated on December 11, 1900, passed in the vicinity of Lick Run. It was built in 1901 and was owned by John Duncan as a logging railroad. However, it was sold to the White Deer Lumber Company and became the White Deer and Loganton Railroad on April 17, 1906.

== Biology ==
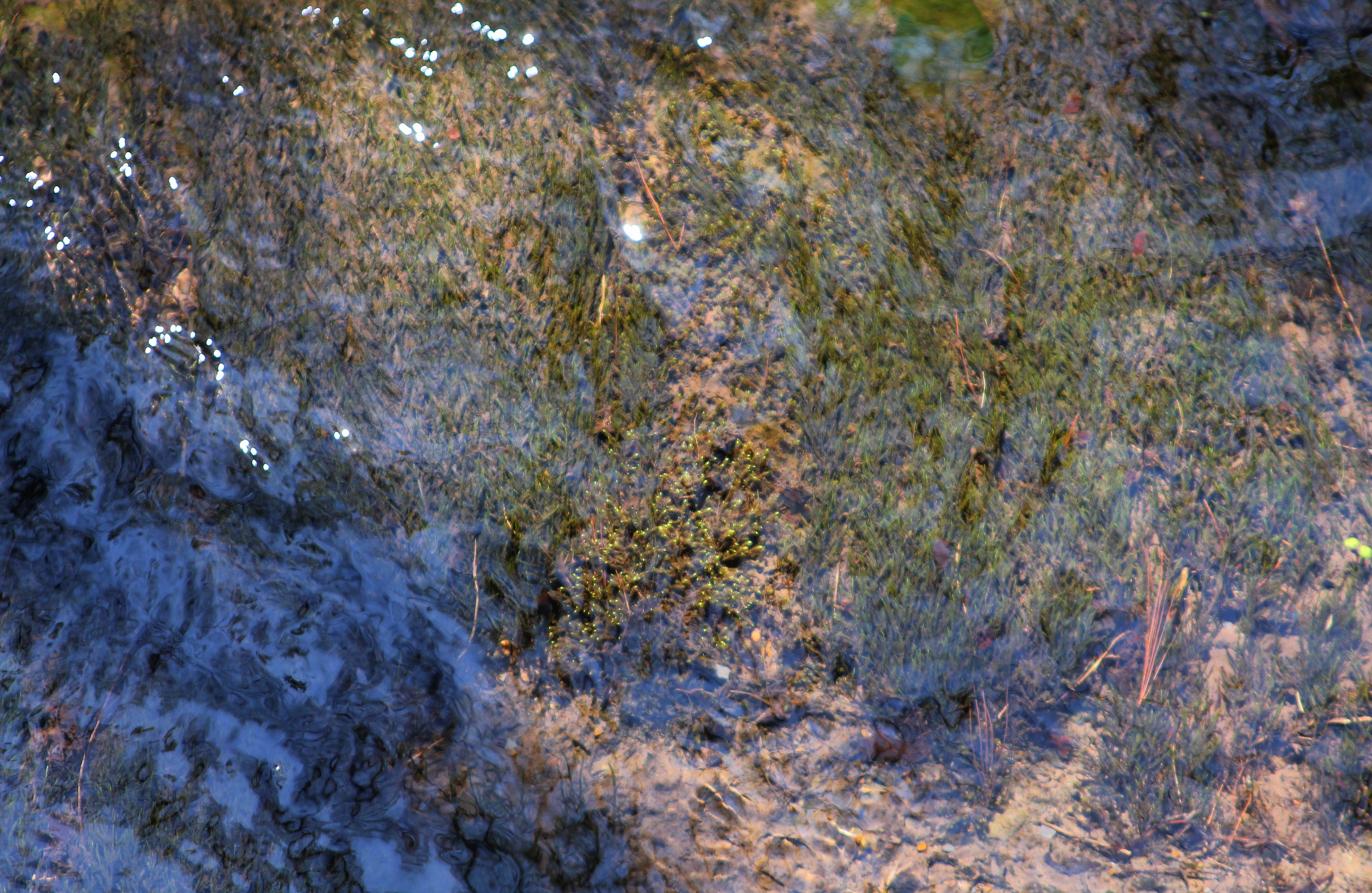
Plantlife in Mile Run

Wild trout naturally reproduce in Mile Run for a total of 1.24 miles (2.00 km) of its length. The trout species in the stream is brook trout.

A variety of bryophyte species were observed in the vicinity of Mile Run on July 29, 1995. Approximately 20 species were observed, including Hygroamblystegium tenax, Hypnum pallescens, Platyhypnidium riparioides, Platylomella lescurii, Hypnum lindbergii, and numerous others.

== See also ==
- Lick Run (White Deer Creek), next tributary of White Deer Creek going downstream
- Sand Spring Run, next tributary of White Deer Creek going upstream
- List of rivers of Pennsylvania
