= Splash dam =

Temporary wooden dam for logging

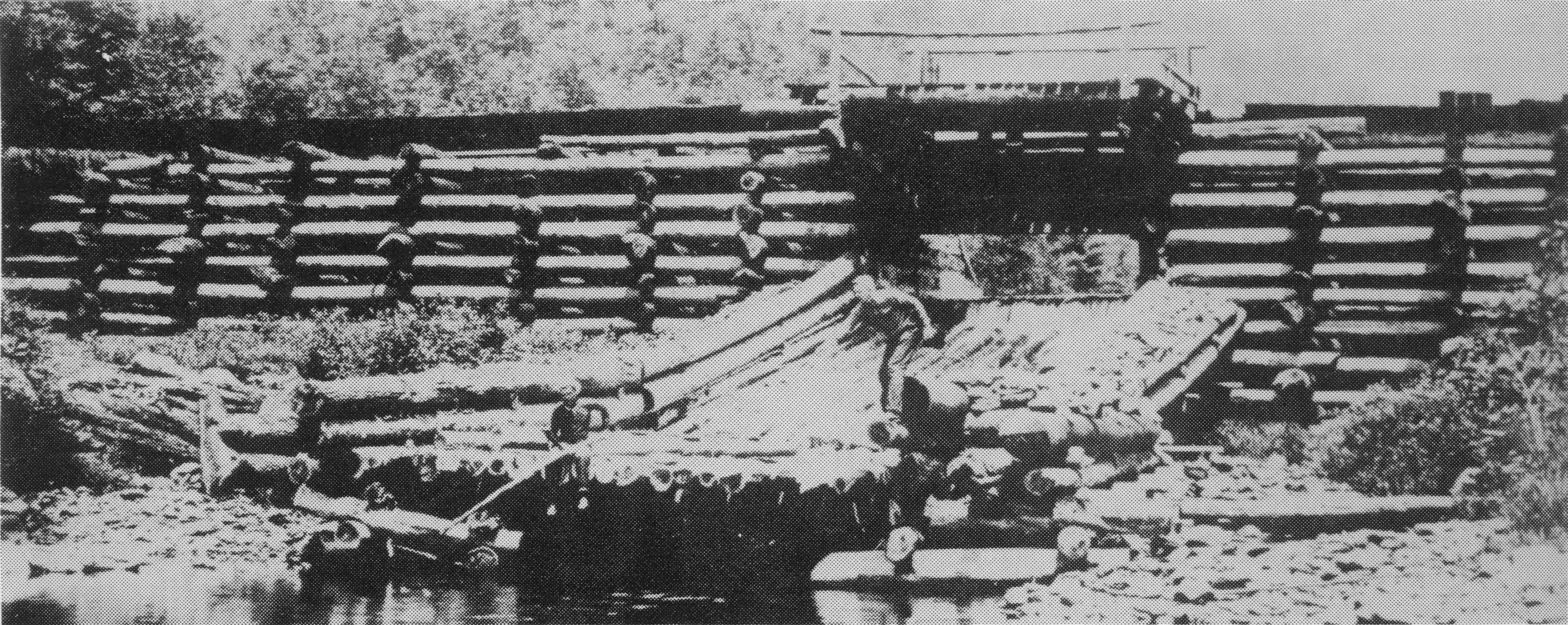
A splash dam made of logs on Otter Run in Lycoming County, Pennsylvania in summer: the chute is being repaired.

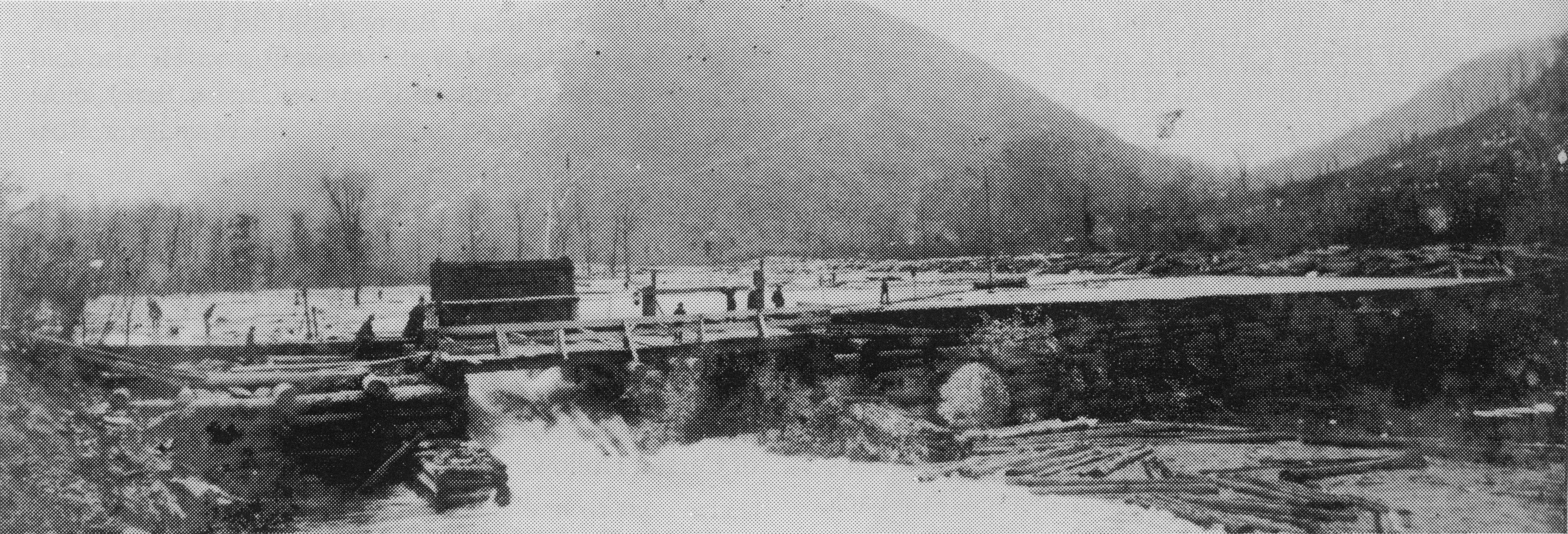
The same splash dam in operation; the chute gate is open and there are logs in the pond behind the dam.

A splash dam was a temporary wooden dam used to raise the water level in streams to float logs downstream to sawmills. By impounding water and allowing it to be released on the log drive's schedule, these dams allowed many more logs to be brought to market than the natural flow of the stream allowed. Water releases from multiple splash dams on tributaries were also often combined to maximize the number of logs floated throughout a given watershed.

== Construction ==
Splash dams were typically constructed of logs or boards, which formed cribs that were then filled with stones and earth. They could be anywhere from 50 feet (15 m) to several hundred feet wide and were used from one to several years. A splash dam had to be sited on a section of the stream that allowed as large a body of water to accumulate behind the dam as possible. Behind the dam logs were transported to the creek and its banks, often along log slides.

The splash dam was equipped with a chute to allow water and logs to escape. When the chute was closed, water collected behind the dam. Construction work also extended to the stream below the splash dam, which had to be cleared of obstacles and often had its banks cleared for some distance above the waterline. This was an effort to prevent as many logs as possible from becoming stuck on the banks of the stream. The Pennsylvania General Assembly passed a law on March 28, 1871, allowing splash dam construction and clearing of creeks to allow loose logs to float better.

== Use ==
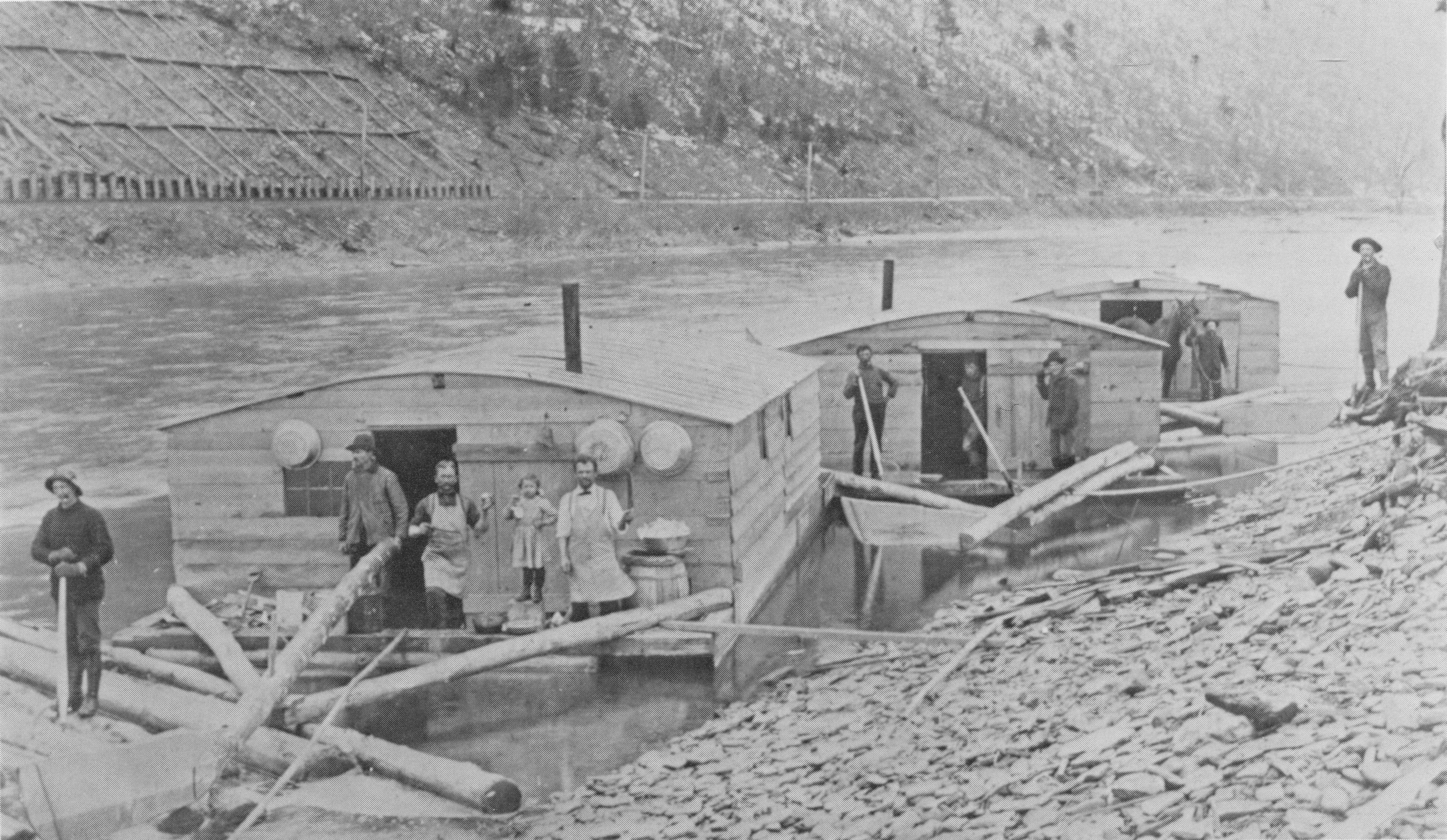
Pine Creek lumber drive, with arks for kitchen and dining (left), sleeping (center), and horses (right): the railroad is on the shore behind.

Originally lumber was only floated downstream using seasonal high water, typically in spring following snowmelt. Loggers found that by constructing a dam to impound water they could control the level of water and float more logs, which improved conditions for log drivers. In addition to the annual early spring log drive in March, splash dams frequently allowed smaller drives any time there was sufficient water: in Pennsylvania, rains could lead to drives in May or June, and small drives in September or October were also possible.

To give some idea of the scale of the log drives, Pennsylvania's Pine Creek, the largest tributary of the West Branch Susquehanna River, had produced rafts of pine spars for decades, ending in 1865. The earliest spring log drives there floated up to 20,000,000 board feet (47,000 m^{3}) of logs in the creek at one time. In 1908, a single splash dam in north-central Pennsylvania floated 8,000,000 board feet (19,000 m^{3}) in one log drive.

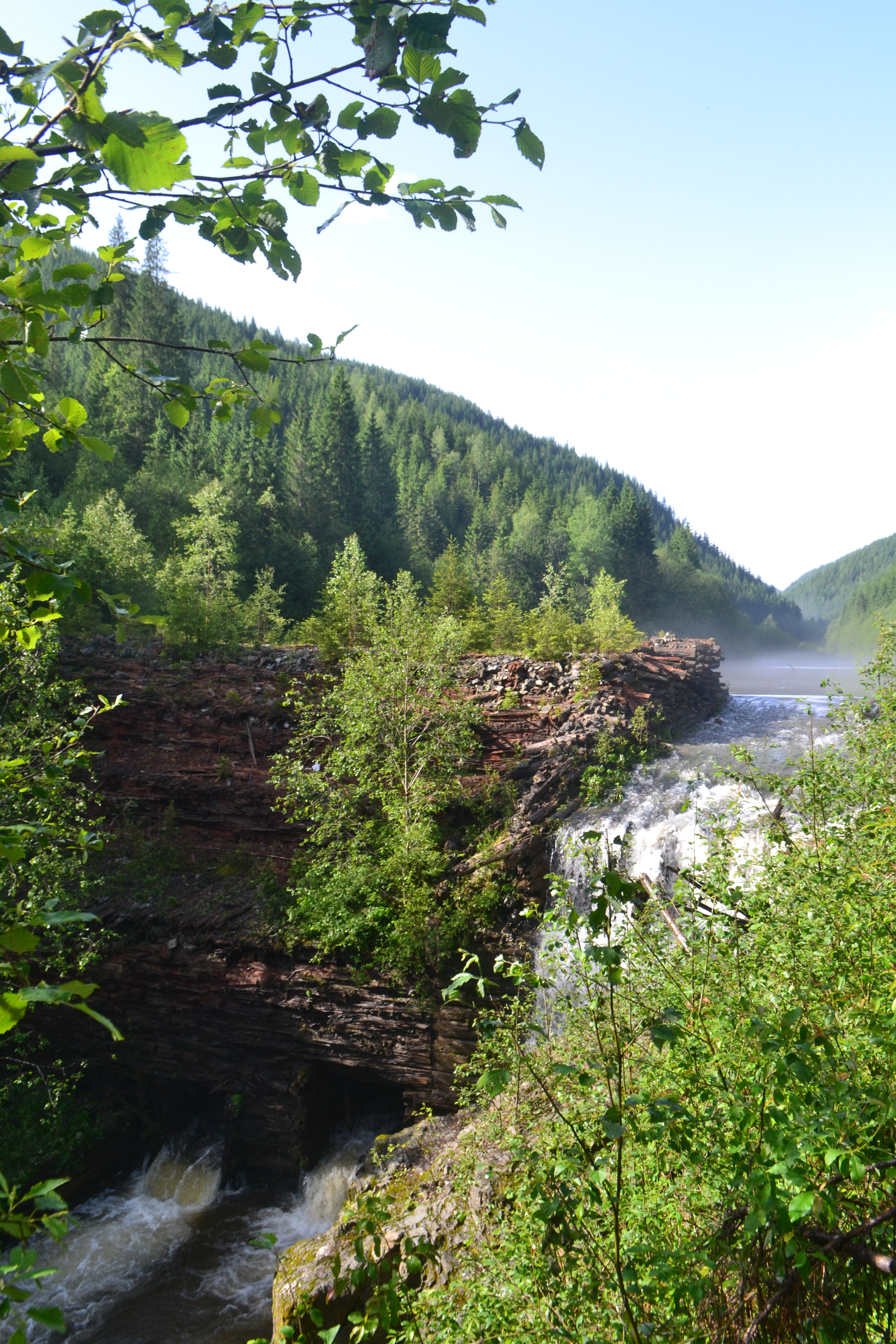
Nowadays in Ukrainian Carpathians

Log drives lasted four to six days in northern Pennsylvania. A series of arks (boats specially built for the drive) floated down the creek behind the logs. Typically one boat was the kitchen and dining area, one served as sleeping quarters for the men, and one provided shelter for the horses. The men and horses worked in the creek all day getting logs stranded on the banks back in the water. Log jams were a problem as well and required careful removal of one or more key logs to break the jam and allow the logs to again flow freely. Breaking a logjam might involve one or more men working with hand tools, or it might involve explosives.

By impounding water and allowing it to be released on the log drive's schedule, these dams allowed many more logs to be brought to market than the natural flow of the stream allowed. Water releases from multiple splash dams on tributaries were also often combined to maximize the number of logs floated throughout a given watershed. On the Red River in eastern Kentucky, a series of carefully timed releases of water from splash dams allowed log drives to travel 20 miles (32 km) downstream. These drives had between 35,000 and 50,000 logs in them, and one produced a log jam 1 mile (1.6 km) long.

== Impact on environment ==
Splash dams had long-lasting negative impacts on stream structure and ecological function, some of which are apparent today. Impoundment of water blocked downstream flows (see Environmental impact of reservoirs. Before transport, downstream obstacles such as boulders, beaver dams, and natural logjams were dynamited. The release of large artificial floods and masses of logs downriver scoured streams to bedrock and damaged or destroyed habitat for anadromous fish such as salmon and lamprey. Over a century after splash dams fell out of use, stream reaches in Oregon where splash dams were constructed still have poorer habitat suitability for fish.

== Legacy ==
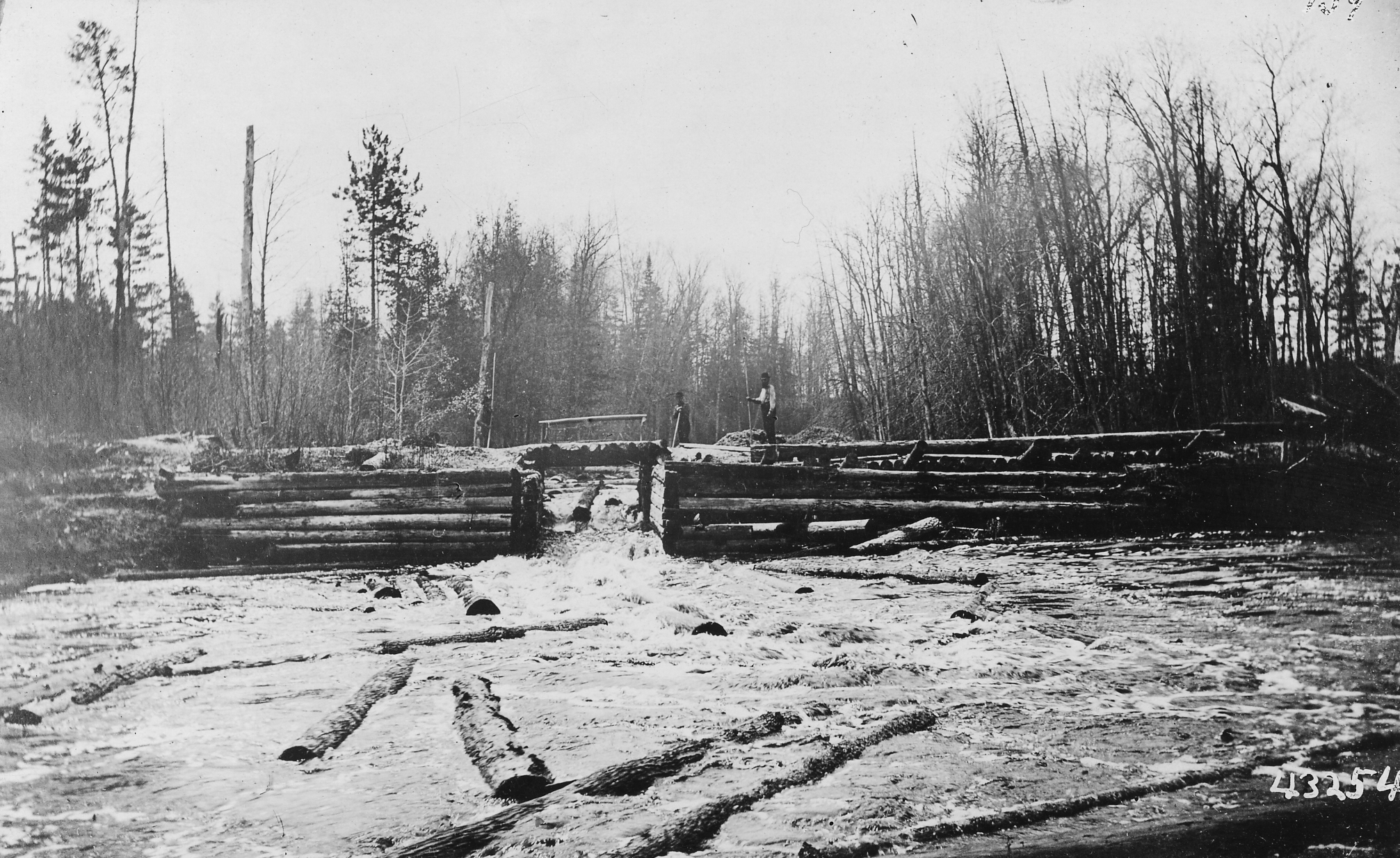
Splash dam in northern Michigan

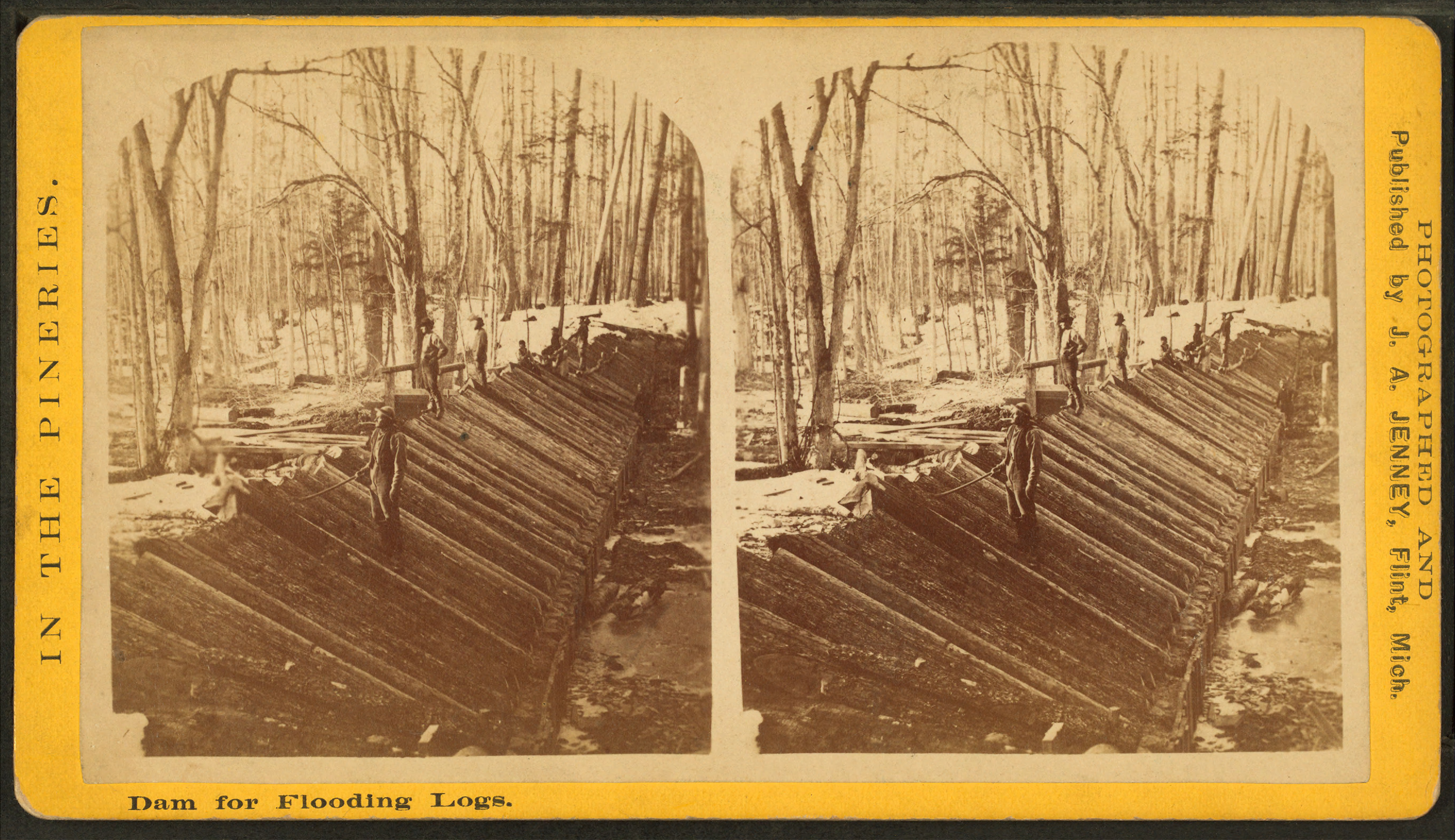
Dam for flooding logs, Michigan, 1870s

Splash dams operated across the United States, from about 1860 to 1930. As of 2008, the United States Geological Survey Geographic Names Information System shows thirteen place names in the United States containing the words "splash dam". Pennsylvania has the most, with eight places, but there are also places in Kentucky, Virginia, Utah, and Idaho named "Splash Dam". Two Pennsylvania state parks, Parker Dam State Park and McCalls Dam State Park, are named for splash dams.
