= Freestone stream =

In fly fishing, a freestone stream flows seasonally, based on the water supply. In the summer and fall, freestone streams grow warm and have reduced flow because water from snow melt is less readily available. In contrast to limestone streams, which flow over limestone and dolomite, freestone streams generally flow over sandstone, shale, and crystalline rocks. Additionally, freestone streams are supplied by runoff and snowmelt, while limestone streams are usually fed by springs, providing cooler waters and a more stable pH balance.
