= National Register of Historic Places listings in Union County, Pennsylvania =

Location of Union County in Pennsylvania

This is a list of the National Register of Historic Places listings in Union County, Pennsylvania.

This is intended to be a complete list of the properties and districts on the National Register of Historic Places in Union County, Pennsylvania, United States. The locations of National Register properties and districts for which the latitude and longitude coordinates are included below, may be seen in a map.

There are 20 properties and districts listed on the National Register in the county.

This National Park Service list is complete through NPS recent listings posted March 14, 2025.

== Current listings ==
	Name on the Register	Image	Date listed	Location	City or town	Description
1	Allenwood River Bridge	Allenwood River Bridge	June 22, 1988 (#88000865)	Legislative Route 460 over the West Branch of the Susquehanna River at Allenwood; 41°06′28″N 76°53′25″W	Gregg Township	Bridge was replaced with a new structure in 1990. It extended into Delaware Township in Northumberland County
2	Buffalo Presbyterian Church	Buffalo Presbyterian Church	January 30, 1976 (#76001675)	West of Lewisburg on Pennsylvania Route 192; 40°57′47″N 76°58′04″W	Buffalo Township	
3	Chamberlin Iron Front Building	Chamberlin Iron Front Building	May 14, 1979 (#79002347)	434 Market Street; 40°57′48″N 76°53′15″W	Lewisburg	
4	Factory Bridge	Factory Bridge	February 8, 1980 (#80003645)	1 mile (1.6 km) west of White Deer on Township 629; 41°04′25″N 76°54′12″W	White Deer Township	
5	Benjamin Griffey House	Benjamin Griffey House	September 13, 1978 (#78002474)	West of Allenwood on Pennsylvania Route 44; 41°07′18″N 76°57′56″W	Gregg Township	The house was badly damaged in a 1980 fire, and is no longer standing at its original location.
6	Halfway Lake Dam	Halfway Lake Dam	May 11, 1987 (#87000046)	16 miles (26 km) west of Lewisburg on Pennsylvania Route 192; 40°59′24″N 77°11′23″W	Hartley Township	
7	Hassenplug Bridge	Hassenplug Bridge	February 8, 1980 (#80003641)	North 4th Street; 40°55′25″N 77°03′00″W	Mifflinburg	
8	Hayes Bridge	Hayes Bridge	February 8, 1980 (#80003642)	West of Mifflinburg on Township 376; 40°55′34″N 77°05′32″W	West Buffalo Township	
9	William A. Heiss House and Buggy Shop	William A. Heiss House and Buggy Shop	August 6, 1979 (#79002348)	523 Green Street; 40°54′53″N 77°02′55″W	Mifflinburg	
10	Lewisburg Armory	Lewisburg Armory	November 14, 1991 (#91001700)	U.S. Route 15 south of its junction with Pennsylvania Route 45; 40°56′47″N 76°52′49″W	East Buffalo Township	
11	Lewisburg Historic District	Lewisburg Historic District	July 28, 2004 (#04000759)	Roughly bounded by U.S. Route 15, Beck Street, the Susquehanna River, and the borough boundary 40°57′51″N 76°53′04″W	Lewisburg	
12	Mifflinburg Historic District	Mifflinburg Historic District	April 10, 1980 (#80003643)	Pennsylvania Route 45; 40°54′59″N 77°02′58″W	Mifflinburg	
13	Millmont Red Bridge	Millmont Red Bridge	February 8, 1980 (#80003644)	Southwest of Millmont on Legislative Route 59005; 40°52′41″N 77°09′21″W	Hartley Township	
14	New Berlin Presbyterian Church	New Berlin Presbyterian Church	October 26, 1972 (#72001178)	Vine and High Streets; 40°52′46″N 76°59′13″W	New Berlin	
15	Old Union County Courthouse	Old Union County Courthouse	November 9, 1972 (#72001179)	Market and Vine Streets; 40°52′43″N 76°59′12″W	New Berlin	
16	Packwood House-American Hotel	Packwood House-American Hotel	September 20, 1978 (#78002475)	10 Market Street; 40°57′59″N 76°52′57″W	Lewisburg	
17	Reading Railroad Freight Station	Reading Railroad Freight Station	January 22, 1992 (#91002012)	Junction of South 5th and St. Louis Streets; 40°57′48″N 76°53′15″W	Lewisburg	
18	Slifer House	Slifer House	June 18, 1975 (#75001668)	North of Lewisburg off U.S. Route 15 on Pennsylvania Route 59024; 40°58′33″N 76°52′59″W	Kelly Township	
19	George Christian and Anna Catherine Spangler Farm	George Christian and Anna Catherine Spangler Farm	August 4, 2016 (#16000517)	1175 Wildwood Rd. 40°51′52″N 77°01′48″W	Mifflinburg	An 1802, two-story stone house and circa 1840 large bank barn are highlights of this historic farm. Located along Penns Creek the farm has been continuously farmed for well over 200 years.
20	Watsontown River Bridge	Watsontown River Bridge	June 22, 1988 (#88000801)	Legislative Route 240 spur over the West Branch of the Susquehanna River; 41°04′51″N 76°51′55″W	White Deer Township	Extends into Watsontown in Northumberland County

== See also ==
- List of Pennsylvania state historical markers in Union County
