= West Buffalo =

West Buffalo may refer to:

- West Buffalo, Ohio, a ghost town
- West Buffalo Township, Union County, Pennsylvania, a civil township
