= West Milton, Pennsylvania =

Unincorporated community in Pennsylvania, US

Coordinates: 41°01′12″N 76°52′17″W

- Census-designated place
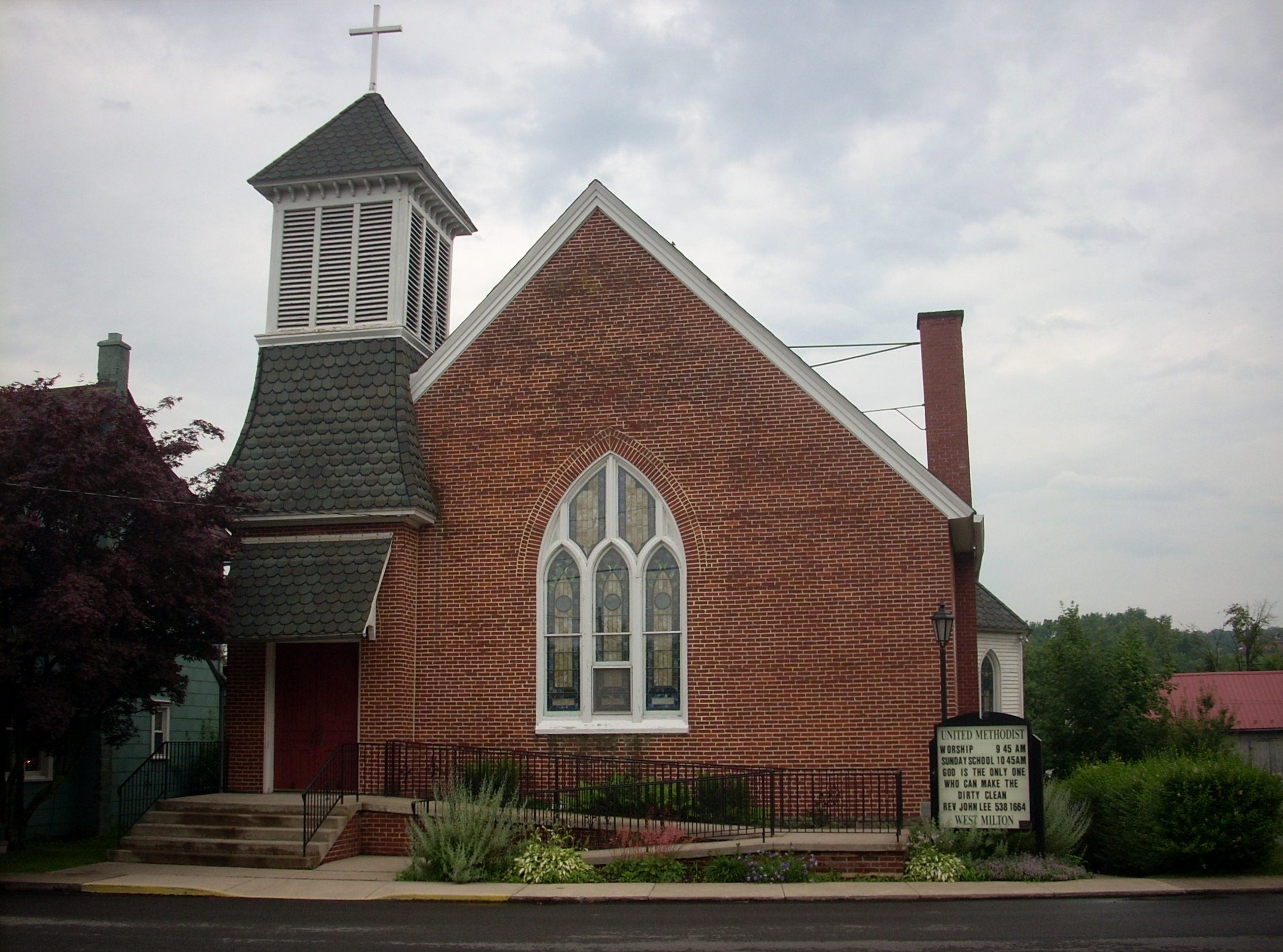
- West Milton United Methodist Church
- Interactive map of West Milton, Pennsylvania
- Country: United States
- State: Pennsylvania
- County: Union
- Township: Kelly, White Deer

Population (2010)
  - Total: 900
- Time zone: UTC-5 (Eastern (EST))
  - Summer (DST): UTC-4 (EDT)
- ZIP code: 17886
- Area codes: 272 and 570

West Milton is a census-designated place located in Kelly and White Deer Townships in Union County in the state of Pennsylvania. The community is located directly across the West Branch Susquehanna River from the borough of Milton which is located in Northumberland County, from which West Milton derived its name. West Milton is located along U.S. Route 15, a few miles south of the community of New Columbia. Between Milton and West Milton, in the river is Montgomery Island where Milton State Park is located. As of the 2010 census the population was 900 residents.

== Education ==
The portion in Kelly Township is in the Lewisburg Area School District. The portion in White Deer Township is in the Milton Area School District.
