= Mifflinburg Area School District =

School district in Pennsylvania

Coordinates: 40.91664°N 77.04111°W

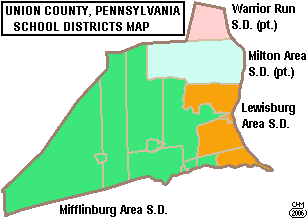
- Shows district region in western Union County

Address
- 178 Maple Street Mifflinburg, Union County, Pennsylvania, 17844; United States

District information
- Type: Public
- Grades: K-12

Students and staff
- District mascot: Wildcat
- Colors: Blue and white

Other information
- Website: https://www.mifflinburg.org/

The Mifflinburg Area School District is a small, rural, public school district serving western Union County, Pennsylvania. Centered on the borough of Mifflinburg, it also serves Buffalo Township, New Berlin, Limestone Township, West Buffalo Township, Lewis Township, Hartleton, and Hartley Township. Mifflinburg Area School District encompasses approximately 217 square miles (560 km^{2}). According to 2000 United States Census data, the district served a resident population of 17,867. By 2010, Mifflinburg Area School District's population declined to 16,366 people. The educational attainment levels for the Mifflinburg Area School District population (25 years old and over) were 81.5% high school graduates and 17.5% college graduates. The region has a large Mennonite community who do not attend school past 8th grade. Most Mennonite children attend private schools operated by the amish community, rather than the local public schools. The district is one of the 500 public school districts of Pennsylvania and one of four full or partial public school districts operating in Union County.

According to the Pennsylvania Budget and Policy Center, 40% of the district's pupils lived at 185% or below the Federal Poverty level as shown by their eligibility for the federal free or reduced price school meal programs in 2012. In 2009, the per capita income was $16,987, while the median family income was reported as $42,418 a year. In the Commonwealth, the median family income was $49,501 and the United States median family income was $49,445, in 2010. In Union County, the median household income was $45,474. By 2013, the median household income in the United States rose to $52,100. In 2014, the median household income in the USA was $53,700.

Per District officials, in school year 2007–08, Mifflinburg Area School District provided basic educational services to 2,310 pupils through the employment of 153 teachers, 55 full-time and part-time support personnel, and 17 administrators. In school year 2009–10, MASD enrollment had declined to 2,246 pupils. The district increased employment to: 175 teachers, 161 full-time and part-time support personnel, and 16 administrators. Mifflinburg Area School District received more than $11.1 million in state funding in school year 2009–10. MASD enrollment declined to 2,211 pupils in 2011–12. The district employed: 160 teachers, 118 full-time and part-time support personnel, and fifteen (15) administrators during the 2011–12 school year. The district received $11.3 million in state funding in the 2011–12 school year.

Mifflinburg Area School District operates: Mifflinburg Area Elementary School, Mifflinburg Area Intermediate School, Mifflinburg Area Middle School, and Mifflinburg Area High School which are all located in a cluster mostly within the borough of Mifflinburg, with a small portion within Buffalo and West Buffalo Townships.

High school students may choose to attend the SUN Area Technical Institute for training in the building trades, food service or allied health industry. The Central Susquehanna Intermediate Unit IU16 provides the district with a wide variety of services like specialized education for disabled students and hearing, speech and visual disability services and professional development for staff and faculty.

== Closed Schools ==
In 2011, the school board voted to close Laurelton Elementary School, New Berlin Elementary School, and Buffalo Crossroads Elementary School.

== Extracurriculars ==
Mifflinburg Area School District offers a wide variety of clubs, activities and an extensive sports program. Mifflinburg ASD offers: FFA, Interact Club (Rotary related), Key Club (Kiwanis related), National Honor Society Laurel Chapter, Outdoors Club, Ski Club, Technology Student Association (TSA), and Student Government.

Mifflinburg School District is known for its music program, which hosts a concert and chamber choir, marching and concert bands, as well as a jazz band and pep band. The school's drama department is a local favorite for their fall production (usually a play) and their spring production (usually a musical).

=== Sports ===
The district funds:

Boys

- Baseball - AAAA
- Basketball - AAAA
- Bowling - AAAA
- Cross Country - AA
- Football - AAA
- Golf - AA
- Lacrosse - AA
- Soccer - AAA
- Tennis - AA
- Track and Field - AA
- Wrestling - AA

Girls

- Basketball - AAAA
- Bowling - AAAA
- Cross Country - AA
- Field Hockey - A
- Golf - AA
- Lacrosse - AA
- Soccer (Fall) - AA
- Softball - AAA
- Girls' Tennis - AA
- Track and Field - AA

Middle School Sports

Boys

- Baseball
- Basketball
- Cross Country
- Football
- Soccer
- Wrestling

Girls

- Basketball
- Cross Country
- Field Hockey
- Softball
- Wrestling

According to PIAA directory July 2016
