= Buffalo Township, Pennsylvania =

Buffalo Township is the name of some places in the U.S. state of Pennsylvania:

- Buffalo Township, Butler County, Pennsylvania
- Buffalo Township, Perry County, Pennsylvania
- Buffalo Township, Union County, Pennsylvania
- Buffalo Township, Washington County, Pennsylvania

== See also ==
- East Buffalo Township, Union County, Pennsylvania
- North Buffalo Township, Pennsylvania
- South Buffalo Township, Pennsylvania
- West Buffalo Township, Union County, Pennsylvania
