= Mifflinburg Area High School =

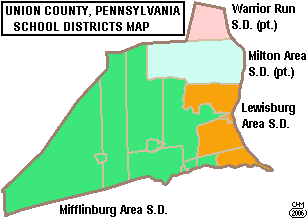
- Shows district region in western Union County

Location
- 75 Market Street; Mifflinburg, Union County, Pennsylvania 17844; United States; 40.9184°N 77.0401°W

Information
- Type: Public
- Principal: Mr. Jeremiah Allen
- Teaching staff: 45.45 (FTE)
- Grades: K–12
- Enrollment: 521 (2023–2024)
- Student to teacher ratio: 11.46
- Language: English
- Colors: Blue and White
- Mascot: Wildcat
- Feeder schools: Mifflinburg Area Middle School
- Website: https://hs.mifflinburg.org/

Mifflinburg Area High School is a small, rural, public high school located at 75 Market Street, Mifflinburg, in Union County, Pennsylvania. It is the sole high school operated by the Mifflinburg Area School District. In 2016, enrollment was 553 pupils in 9th through 12th grades. Mifflinburg Area High School students may choose to attend SUN Area Technical Institute for training in the building trades, engine mechanics, the food service industry or allied health industry. SUN Area Technical Institute is funded by payments from the funding districts: Mifflinburg Area School District, Lewisburg Area School District, Midd-West School District, Selinsgrove Area School District and Shikellamy School District. The Central Susquehanna Intermediate Unit IU16 provides the Mifflinburg Area High School with a wide variety of services like specialized education for disabled students and hearing, speech and visual disability services and professional development for staff and faculty.

Mifflinburg Area High School serves the borough of Mifflinburg, Buffalo Township, New Berlin, Limestone Township, West Buffalo Township, Lewis Township, Hartleton, and Hartley Township.

== Extracurriculars ==
Mifflinburg Area School District offers a wide variety of clubs, activities and an extensive sports program. The Mifflinburg Area School District is a member of the Pennsylvania Heartland Athletic Conference for all athletics and participates under the rules and guidelines of the Pennsylvania Interscholastic Athletic Association. The Pennsylvania Heartland Athletic Conference is a voluntary association of 25 PIAA High Schools within the central Pennsylvania region.

Mifflinburg Area High School offers: FFA, Interact Club (Rotary related), Key Club (Kiwanis related), National Honor Society Laurel Chapter, Outdoors Club, Ski Club, Technology Student Association (TSA), Future Teachers of America, and Student Government.

Mifflinburg School District is known for its music program, which hosts a concert and chamber choir, marching and concert bands, as well as a jazz band and pep band. The school's drama department is a local favorite for their fall production (usually a play) and their spring production (usually a musical).

=== Sports ===
The district funds:

Boys

- Baseball - AAA
- Basketball - AAA
- Bowling - AAAA
- Cross country - AA
- Football - AA
- Golf - AAA
- Lacrosse - AAAA
- Soccer - AA
- Tennis - AA
- Track and field - AAA
- Wrestling - AA

Girls

- Basketball - AAA
- Bowling - AAAA
- Cross country - AA
- Field hockey - AA
- Golf - AA
- Lacrosse - AAAA
- Soccer - AA
- Softball - AAA
- Tennis - AA
- Track and field -AAA

According to PIAA directory July 2013
