= 1964 United States presidential election in Pennsylvania =

- November 3, 1964

Nominee	Lyndon B. Johnson	Barry Goldwater
Party	Democratic	Republican
Home state	Texas	Arizona
Running mate	Hubert Humphrey	William E. Miller
Electoral vote	29	0
Popular vote	3,130,954	1,673,657
Percentage	64.92%	34.70%

Johnson
50–60%
60–70%
70–80%
80–90%
90–100%
Goldwater
50–60%
60–70%
70–80%
80–90%
Tie
President before election
Lyndon B. Johnson
Democratic
Elected President
Lyndon B. Johnson
Democratic

The 1964 United States presidential election in Pennsylvania took place on November 3, 1964, and was part of the 1964 United States presidential election. Voters chose 29 representatives to the Electoral College, who voted for president and vice president.

Pennsylvania overwhelmingly voted for the Democratic nominee, President Lyndon B. Johnson, over the Republican nominee, Senator Barry Goldwater. Johnson won Pennsylvania by a margin of 30.22%. Apart from William Howard Taft in 1912 (when third-party candidates obtained substantial minorities of the vote), Goldwater's 34.7% of the vote is easily the worst showing for a Republican in the state since the party was founded. Even relative to Johnson's popular vote landslide, Pennsylvania came out as 7.64% more Democratic than the nation at-large; the only occasion under the current two-party system that the state has been more anomalously Democratic than this was in Ronald Reagan's 1984 landslide.

During the 1960s the Republican Party was turning its attention from the declining rural Yankee counties to the growing and traditionally Democratic Catholic vote, along with the conservative Sun Belt whose growth was driven by lower taxes, warm weather, and air conditioning. This growth meant that activist Republicans centered in the Sun Belt had become much more conservative than the majority of members in historic Northeastern GOP strongholds.

The consequence of this was that a bitterly divided Republican Party was able to nominate the staunchly conservative Senator Barry Goldwater of Arizona, who ran with the equally conservative Republican National Committee chair, Congressman William E. Miller of New York, for president in 1964. Goldwater was widely seen in the liberal Northeastern United States as a right-wing extremist or at least an inexperienced nominee prone to gaffes; he had voted against the Civil Rights Act of 1964, and the Johnson campaign portrayed him as liable to provoke a nuclear war. Goldwater wrote Pennsylvania off from the very beginning of his campaign. Pennsylvania Republicans had generally preferred moderate Governor William Scranton for the nomination, who was unsuccessfully encouraged to run by Dwight D. Eisenhower. Many Pennsylvania Republicans, such as Representative James G. Fulton, refused to endorse Goldwater.

== Results ==
1964 United States presidential election in Pennsylvania
Party	Candidate	Votes	Percentage	Electoral votes
Democratic	Lyndon B. Johnson (incumbent)	3,130,954	64.92%	29
Republican	Barry Goldwater	1,673,657	34.70%	0
Militant Workers	Clifton DeBerry	10,456	0.22%	0
Socialist Labor	Eric Hass	5,092	0.11%	0
Write-ins	Write-ins	2,531	0.05%	0
Totals		4,822,690	100.00%	29
Voter turnout (voting age/registered)				68%/84%

=== Results by county ===
County	Lyndon B. Johnson Democratic		Barry Goldwater Republican		Various candidates Other parties		Margin		Total votes cast
County	#	%	#	%	#	%	#	%	Total votes cast
Adams	11,148	56.13%	8,617	43.39%	95	0.48%	2,531	12.74%	19,860
Allegheny	475,207	66.03%	241,707	33.58%	2,811	0.39%	233,500	32.45%	719,725
Armstrong	21,098	66.37%	10,618	33.40%	74	0.23%	10,480	32.97%	31,790
Beaver	60,492	72.02%	23,174	27.59%	327	0.39%	37,318	44.43%	83,993
Bedford	9,165	53.45%	7,968	46.47%	14	0.08%	1,197	6.98%	17,147
Berks	73,444	66.38%	36,726	33.19%	476	0.43%	36,718	33.19%	110,646
Blair	26,157	51.76%	24,301	48.09%	73	0.14%	1,856	3.67%	50,531
Bradford	10,714	50.63%	10,434	49.31%	14	0.07%	280	1.32%	21,162
Bucks	78,287	60.60%	50,243	38.89%	646	0.50%	28,044	21.71%	129,176
Butler	27,267	60.97%	17,360	38.82%	95	0.21%	9,907	22.15%	44,722
Cambria	55,183	67.63%	26,281	32.21%	134	0.16%	28,902	35.42%	81,598
Cameron	1,904	57.96%	1,376	41.89%	5	0.15%	528	16.07%	3,285
Carbon	15,416	67.49%	7,309	32.00%	116	0.51%	8,107	35.49%	22,841
Centre	16,556	63.20%	9,481	36.19%	158	0.60%	7,075	27.01%	26,195
Chester	47,940	54.10%	40,280	45.46%	390	0.44%	7,660	8.64%	88,610
Clarion	9,235	60.01%	6,143	39.92%	11	0.07%	3,092	20.09%	15,389
Clearfield	19,211	62.67%	11,338	36.99%	103	0.34%	7,873	25.68%	30,652
Clinton	10,038	69.84%	4,298	29.91%	36	0.25%	5,740	39.93%	14,372
Columbia	13,885	60.63%	8,982	39.22%	36	0.16%	4,903	21.41%	22,903
Crawford	18,212	62.82%	10,664	36.78%	115	0.40%	7,548	26.04%	28,991
Cumberland	26,633	52.71%	23,685	46.88%	207	0.41%	2,948	5.83%	50,525
Dauphin	46,119	51.57%	42,718	47.77%	594	0.66%	3,401	3.80%	89,431
Delaware	147,189	56.81%	111,189	42.91%	717	0.28%	36,000	13.90%	259,095
Elk	10,455	70.51%	4,354	29.36%	19	0.13%	6,101	41.15%	14,828
Erie	72,944	69.55%	31,393	29.93%	549	0.52%	41,551	39.62%	104,886
Fayette	45,155	73.35%	16,127	26.20%	276	0.45%	29,028	47.15%	61,558
Forest	1,249	57.99%	900	41.78%	5	0.23%	349	16.21%	2,154
Franklin	19,332	58.68%	13,525	41.06%	85	0.26%	5,807	17.62%	32,942
Fulton	2,180	55.37%	1,747	44.37%	10	0.25%	433	11.00%	3,937
Greene	11,412	74.46%	3,896	25.42%	19	0.12%	7,516	49.04%	15,327
Huntingdon	7,435	52.96%	6,571	46.81%	33	0.24%	864	6.15%	14,039
Indiana	17,568	59.92%	11,706	39.92%	46	0.16%	5,862	20.00%	29,320
Jefferson	10,851	56.34%	8,373	43.47%	37	0.19%	2,478	12.87%	19,261
Juniata	4,138	57.19%	3,087	42.67%	10	0.14%	1,051	14.52%	7,235
Lackawanna	88,131	73.73%	31,272	26.16%	137	0.11%	56,859	47.57%	119,540
Lancaster	53,041	50.27%	52,243	49.52%	224	0.21%	798	0.75%	105,508
Lawrence	29,092	64.35%	15,998	35.39%	117	0.26%	13,094	28.96%	45,207
Lebanon	15,882	46.93%	17,891	52.86%	72	0.21%	−2,009	−5.93%	33,845
Lehigh	60,377	64.86%	32,245	34.64%	471	0.51%	28,132	30.22%	93,093
Luzerne	106,397	69.97%	43,895	28.86%	1,779	1.17%	62,502	41.11%	152,071
Lycoming	25,879	57.58%	19,011	42.30%	55	0.12%	6,868	15.28%	44,945
McKean	10,950	57.61%	7,948	41.82%	109	0.57%	3,002	15.79%	19,007
Mercer	32,199	63.68%	18,153	35.90%	211	0.42%	14,046	27.78%	50,563
Mifflin	8,811	59.31%	6,006	40.43%	39	0.26%	2,805	18.88%	14,856
Monroe	10,622	62.41%	6,281	36.91%	116	0.68%	4,341	25.50%	17,019
Montgomery	135,657	56.74%	102,714	42.96%	704	0.29%	32,943	13.78%	239,075
Montour	3,683	59.27%	2,527	40.67%	4	0.06%	1,156	18.60%	6,214
Northampton	58,818	73.08%	21,048	26.15%	619	0.77%	37,770	46.93%	80,485
Northumberland	28,082	62.07%	17,046	37.68%	116	0.26%	11,036	24.39%	45,244
Perry	6,054	52.86%	5,364	46.84%	34	0.30%	690	6.02%	11,452
Philadelphia	670,645	73.42%	239,733	26.24%	3,094	0.34%	430,912	47.18%	913,472
Pike	2,753	50.74%	2,651	48.86%	22	0.41%	102	1.88%	5,426
Potter	3,652	52.86%	3,232	46.78%	25	0.36%	420	6.08%	6,909
Schuylkill	50,560	65.63%	26,386	34.25%	96	0.12%	24,174	31.38%	77,042
Snyder	4,199	44.59%	5,195	55.17%	22	0.23%	−996	−10.58%	9,416
Somerset	17,934	54.65%	14,817	45.15%	63	0.19%	3,117	9.50%	32,814
Sullivan	1,690	55.63%	1,344	44.24%	4	0.13%	346	11.39%	3,038
Susquehanna	7,838	54.37%	6,567	45.55%	12	0.08%	1,271	8.82%	14,417
Tioga	7,415	51.16%	7,064	48.73%	16	0.11%	351	2.43%	14,495
Union	4,262	46.25%	4,944	53.65%	10	0.11%	−682	−7.40%	9,216
Venango	13,065	56.75%	9,873	42.89%	84	0.36%	3,192	13.86%	23,022
Warren	10,598	63.62%	5,965	35.81%	94	0.56%	4,633	27.81%	16,657
Washington	63,482	72.34%	24,127	27.49%	147	0.17%	39,355	44.85%	87,756
Wayne	5,781	46.89%	6,512	52.82%	35	0.28%	−731	−5.93%	12,328
Westmoreland	107,131	71.70%	41,493	27.77%	792	0.53%	65,638	43.93%	149,416
Wyoming	4,268	52.41%	3,864	47.45%	12	0.15%	404	4.96%	8,144
York	58,787	63.30%	33,677	36.26%	408	0.44%	25,110	27.04%	92,872
Totals	3,130,954	64.92%	1,673,657	34.70%	18,079	0.37%	1,457,297	30.22%	4,822,690

==== Counties that flipped from Republican to Democratic ====
- Adams
- Armstrong
- Bedford
- Berks
- Blair
- Bradford
- Bucks
- Butler
- Cameron
- Carbon
- Centre
- Chester
- Clarion
- Clearfield
- Clinton
- Columbia
- Crawford
- Cumberland
- Dauphin
- Delaware
- Forest
- Franklin
- Fulton
- Huntingdon
- Indiana
- Jefferson
- Juniata
- Lancaster
- Lehigh
- Lycoming
- McKean
- Mercer
- Mifflin
- Monroe
- Montgomery
- Montour
- Northumberland
- Perry
- Pike
- Potter
- Somerset
- Sullivan
- Susquehanna
- Tioga
- Venango
- Warren
- Wyoming
- York

== Analysis ==
Johnson won all but four counties in Pennsylvania: the central Pennsylvania counties of Snyder and Union, which have not voted Democratic since the Civil War; northeastern Wayne County, which has never voted Democratic since Grover Cleveland won it in 1892; and Lebanon County, which has only once voted Democratic since 1856 (when Franklin D. Roosevelt narrowly won it in his 1936 landslide). This was the last presidential election in which Philadelphia was not the most Democratic county in Pennsylvania. This is also the only occasion since 1856 when Somerset, Lancaster, and Huntingdon counties have not voted for the Republican presidential candidate, and marked the first time since that election when suburban Delaware County had not voted Republican.

As of the 2024 United States presidential election, this is the only time Cameron County has voted Democratic. Five other counties including Butler, Bradford, Tioga, Potter and McKean cast their solitary vote for a Democratic presidential candidate since at least the Civil War in this election. In addition, much of the Susquehanna Valley and Appalachia (comprising York County, Cumberland County, Franklin County, Adams County, Blair County, Lycoming County, Northumberland County, Bedford County, Butler County, Clarion County, Crawford County, Fulton County, Pike County, Venango County, Mifflin County, Perry County, Jefferson County, Susquehanna County, Wyoming County, Juniata County, Montour County, and Sullivan County) has never voted for a Democratic candidate since.

This was the last occasion until 1988 that the Democrats won Indiana County, 1992 that the Democrats won Bucks County, Centre County, Delaware County, Forest County, Lehigh County, Montgomery County, or Warren County, and 2008 that the Democrats won Dauphin County, Berks County, Monroe County, or Chester County.

== See also ==
- United States presidential elections in Pennsylvania
