= Vicksburg, Union County, Pennsylvania =

Unincorporated community in Pennsylvania, US

Coordinates: 40°56′18″N 76°59′16″W

- Census-designated place
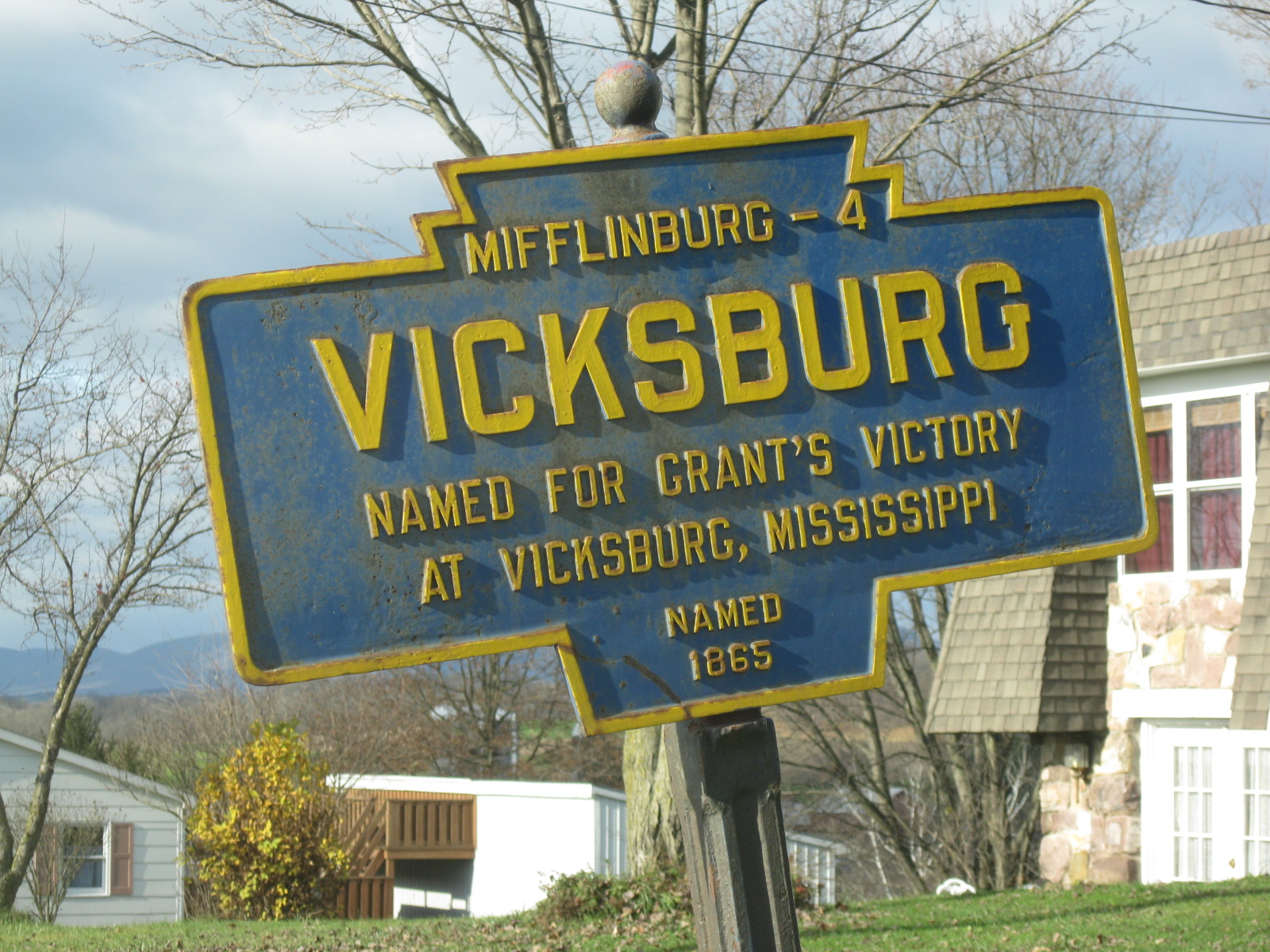
- Keystone Marker
- Interactive map of Vicksburg, Union County, Pennsylvania
- Country: United States
- State: Pennsylvania
- County: Union
- Township: Buffalo

Population (2010)
  - Total: 261
- Time zone: UTC-5 (Eastern (EST))
  - Summer (DST): UTC-4 (EDT)

Vicksburg is a census-designated place located in Buffalo Township, Union County, Pennsylvania, United States. It is located between the boroughs of Mifflinburg and Lewisburg along Pennsylvania Route 45. As of the 2010 census the population was 261 residents.

== Education ==
It is in the Mifflinburg Area School District.
