= Milton Area High School =

School in Pennsylvania, United States

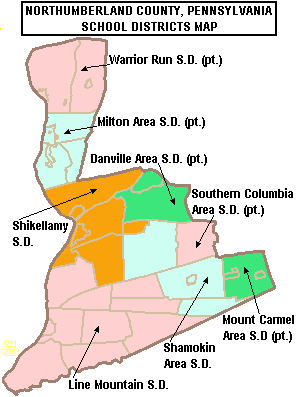

Location
- 700 Mahoning Street; Milton, Union County, Northumberland County, Pennsylvania 17847; United States; 41.0096°N 76.8409°W

Information
- Type: Public
- Motto: Preparing students for 21st century success through Educational Excellence
- School district: Milton Area School District
- Principal: Bryan Noaker
- Teaching staff: 48.02 (FTE)
- Grades: 9-12
- Student to teacher ratio: 12.77
- Language: English
- Mascot: Black Panther
- Feeder schools: Milton Area Middle School
- Website: https://www.miltonsd.org/o/mhs

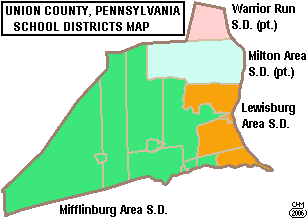
Map of Union County, Pennsylvania Public School Districts

Milton Area High School is a rural/suburban public high school located at 700 Mahoning Street, Milton, Northumberland County, Pennsylvania. It is the sole high school operated by the Milton Area School District. In 2013, the Milton Area High School reported an enrollment of 669 pupils in grades 9th through 12th. The High School employed 53 teachers. Per the Pennsylvania Department of Education 100% of the teachers were rated "Highly Qualified" under the federal No Child Left Behind Act. The total minority enrollment is 11 percent. The school is not a Title I school.

== Milton School in Cambodia ==
Spearheaded by Michael Conn (a history teacher at Milton High School), the members of Team Cambodia, a group dedicated to raising money to build a school in the Kampong Cham province of Cambodia, and the majority of the student body raised over $30,000. The school is completed and is now in service. Students and faculty members of the Milton School District recently completed a trip to Cambodia to check in and report back to the community on the success of the endeavor.

== Extracurriculars ==
Milton Area School District offers a variety of clubs, activities and an extensive sports program.

=== Athletics ===
Milton High School participates in various sports through the Pennsylvania Interscholastic Athletic Association and is a member of the Pennsylvania Heartland Athletic Conference since 2008–2009 school year.

The district funds:

Boys

- Baseball - AAA
- Basketball - AAA
- Bowling - AAAA
- Cross country - AA
- Football - AAA
- Golf - AA
- Soccer - AA
- Tennis - AA
- Track and field - AA
- Wrestling - AA

Girls

- Basketball - AA
- Bowling - AAAA
- Cheer - AAAA added 2014
- Cross country - AA
- Field hockey - AA
- Golf - AA
- Soccer - A
- Softball - AA
- Tennis - AA
- Track and field - AA

According to PIAA directory July 2015

== Alumni ==
- Frances R. Jones, state legislator
