= Hayes Bridge =

Historic place in Pennsylvania, United States

- U.S. National Register of Historic Places
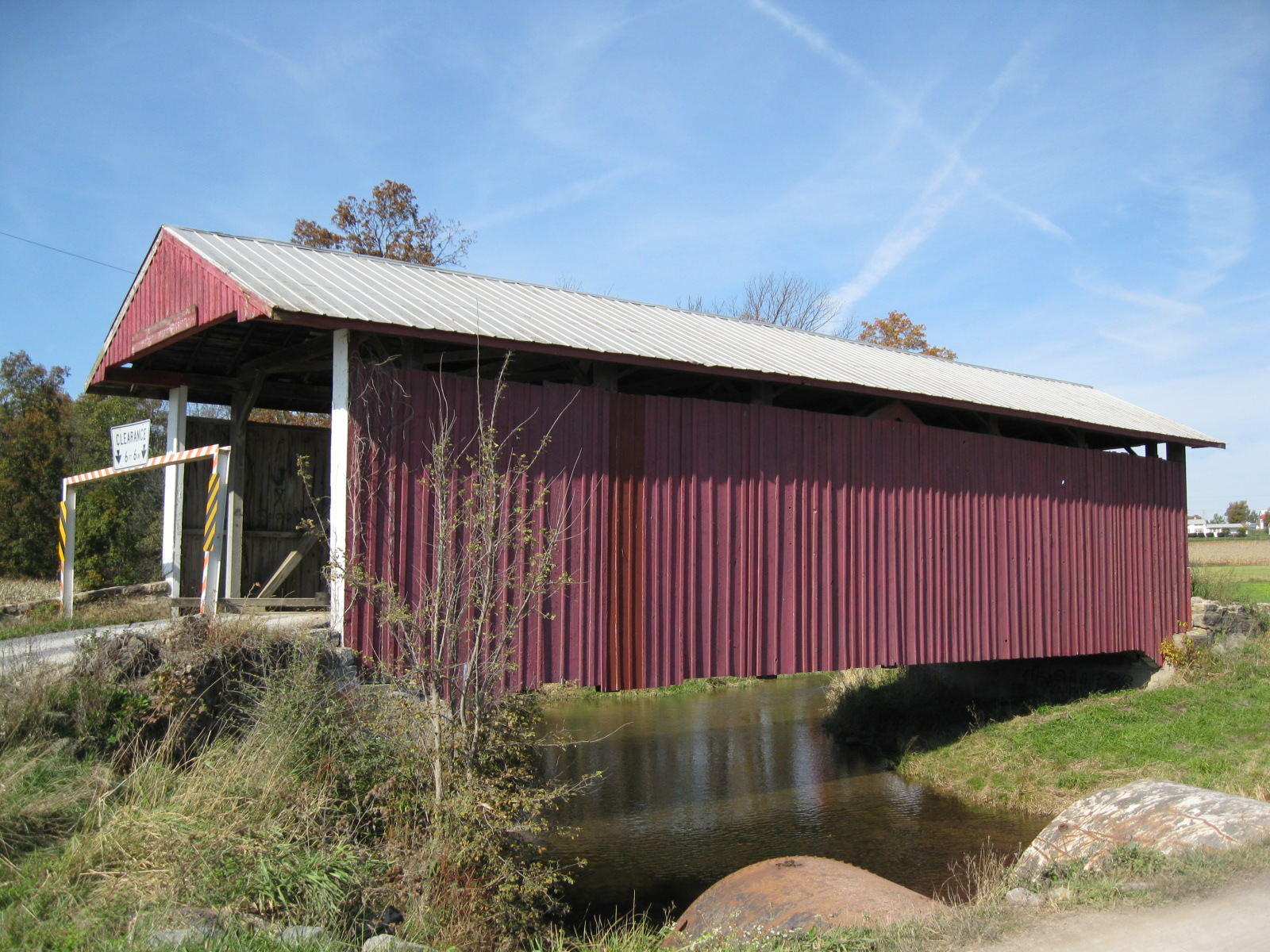
- Hayes Covered Bridge, October 2009

- Location within Pennsylvania Location within the United States
- Location: West of Mifflinburg on Township 376, West Buffalo Township, Pennsylvania
- Coordinates: 40°55′34″N 77°5′32″W
- Area: 0.1 acres (0.040 ha)
- Built: 1882
- Architectural style: King Truss
- MPS: Union County Covered Bridges TR
- NRHP reference No.: 80003642
- Added to NRHP: February 8, 1980

Hayes Bridge is a historic wooden covered bridge in West Buffalo Township, Union County, Pennsylvania. It is a 63-foot-long (19 m), King truss bridge, constructed in 1882, and repaired in 1957. It crosses the west or south branch of Buffalo Creek.

It was listed on the National Register of Historic Places in 1980.
