= Factory Bridge =

- U.S. National Register of Historic Places
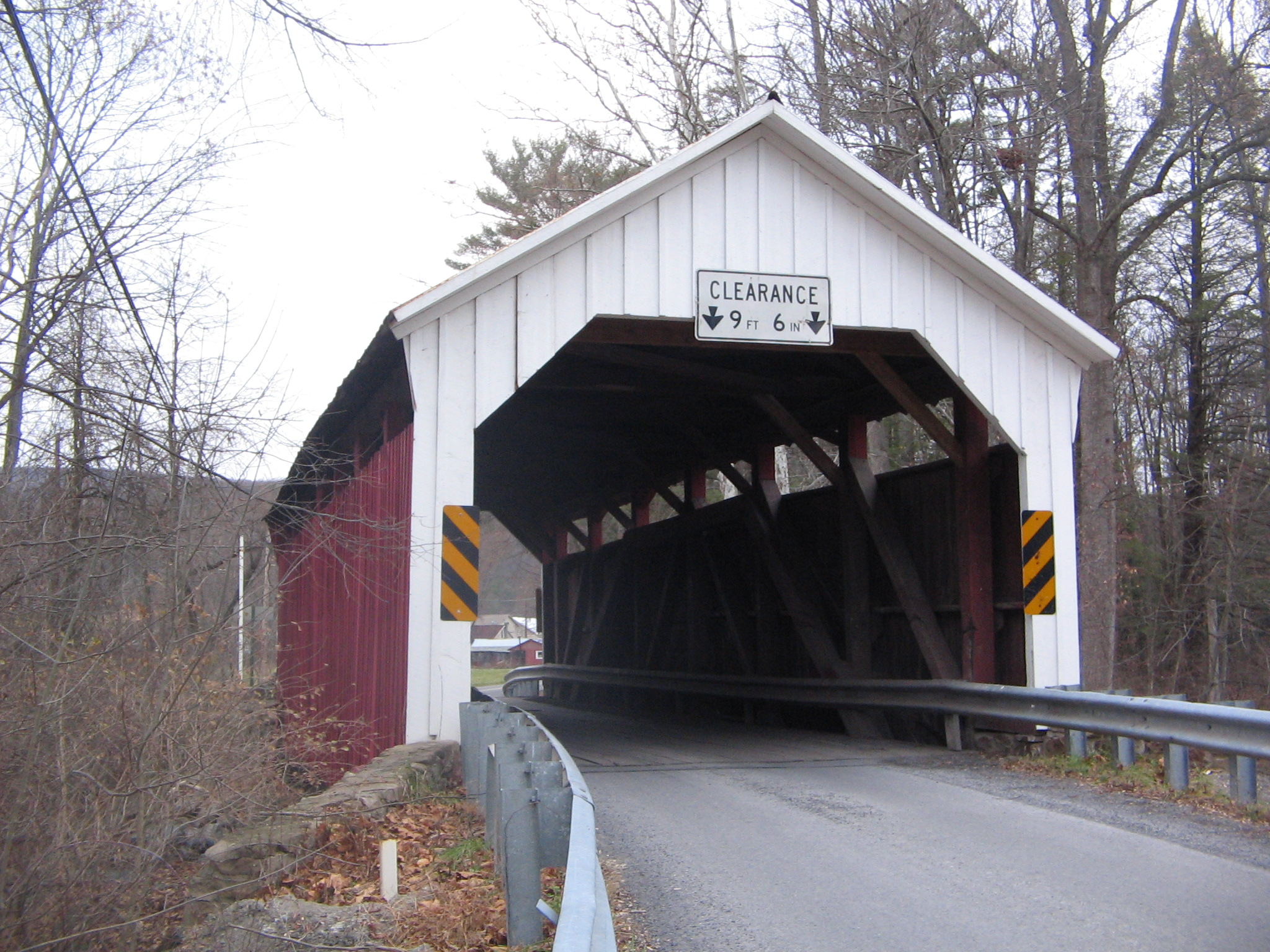
- The bridge in November 2008

- Location within Pennsylvania Location within the United States
- Location: 1 mile (1.6 km) west of White Deer on Township 629, White Deer Township, Pennsylvania
- Coordinates: 41°4′25″N 76°54′12″W
- Area: 0.1 acres (0.040 ha)
- Built: 1880
- Architectural style: King & Queen Trusses
- MPS: Union County Covered Bridges TR
- NRHP reference No.: 80003645
- Added to NRHP: February 8, 1980

Factory Bridge, also known as Horsham Bridge, is a historic wooden covered bridge in White Deer Township, Union County, Pennsylvania. It is a 60-foot-long (18 m), King and Queen truss bridge, constructed in 1880, and repaired in 1954 and 1976. It crosses the White Deer Creek.

It was listed on the National Register of Historic Places in 1980.
