= New Columbia, Pennsylvania =

Unincorporated community in Pennsylvania, US

Coordinates: 41°02′27″N 76°52′0″W

- Census-designated place
- Newky
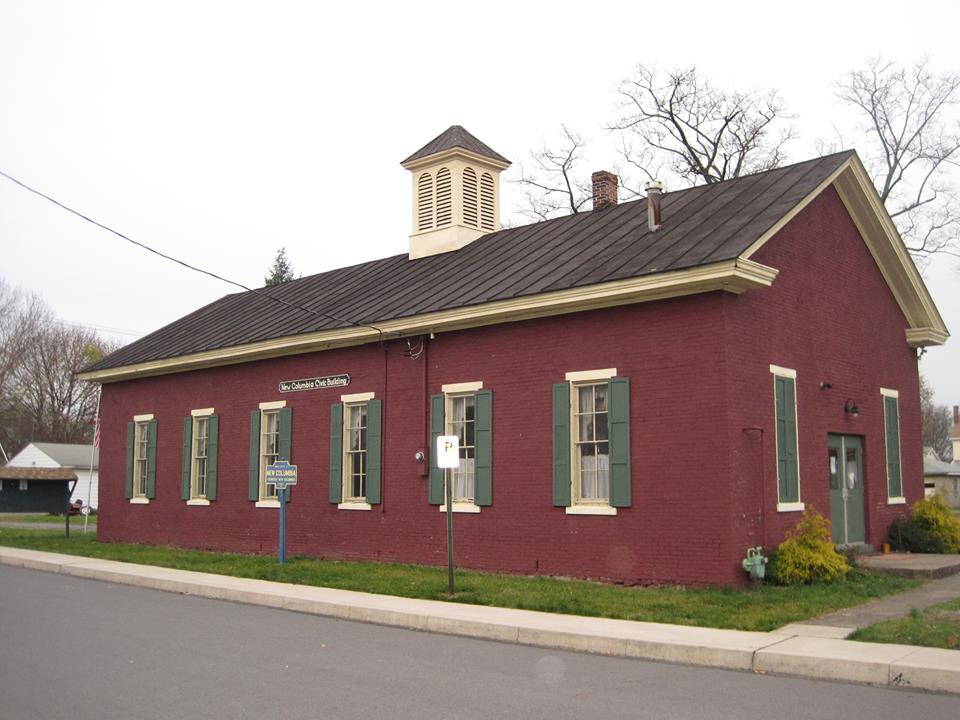
- Interactive map of New Columbia, Pennsylvania
- Country: United States
- State: Pennsylvania
- County: Union
- Township: White Deer

Area
  - Total: 1.93 sq mi (5.00 km^{2})
  - Land: 1.93 sq mi (5.00 km^{2})
  - Water: 0 sq mi (0.00 km^{2})

Population (2020)
  - Total: 1,024
  - Density: 530.8/sq mi (204.94/km^{2})
- Time zone: UTC-5 (Eastern (EST))
  - Summer (DST): UTC-4 (EDT)
- Zip Code: 17856
- Area code: 570
- FIPS code: 42-53432

New Columbia is a census-designated place located in White Deer Township, Union County in the state of Pennsylvania. The community is located in eastern Union County along U.S. Route 15, very near to the West Branch Susquehanna River. As of the 2010 census the population was 1,013 residents.

== Demographics ==
Historical population
Census	Pop.	Note	%±
2020	1,024		—
U.S. Decennial Census

== History ==
The village of New Columbia or "Newky" as the locals call it, was formally laid out and incorporated in 1818 by David Yoder (born 1765). He settled on the area once known as "Dogtown" on the banks of the Susquehanna River. The Yoders purchased 60 acres of land and sold off lots to settlers.

In 1846, New Columbia was called New Columbus and consisted of 30 dwellings, several stores, and a tavern. By 1886, New Columbia had 100 houses, a hotel, a store, a post office, a train station, a boat shop and approximately 350 inhabitants. 1889 marked the year that White Deer Township residents hired their first Constable, Moses Brown. Moses was also a shoemaker. By the 1890s, a baker, confectioner, ice cream shop, and bicycle shop were some of the many businesses in New Columbia.

== Bicentennial ==
The town of New Columbia, Pennsylvania celebrated its 200th birthday in 2018 with a series of events throughout the year. These events highlighted the rich history of this community.

== Education ==
It is in the Milton Area School District.
