= 1912 United States presidential election in Pennsylvania =

- November 5, 1912
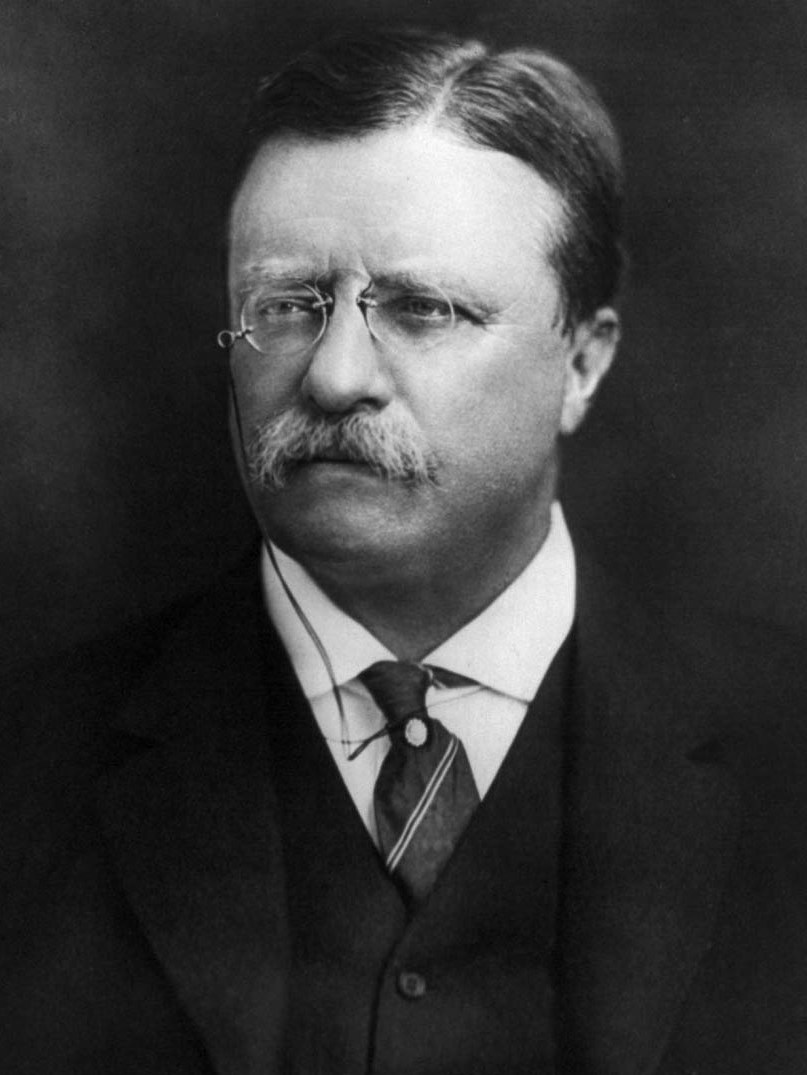

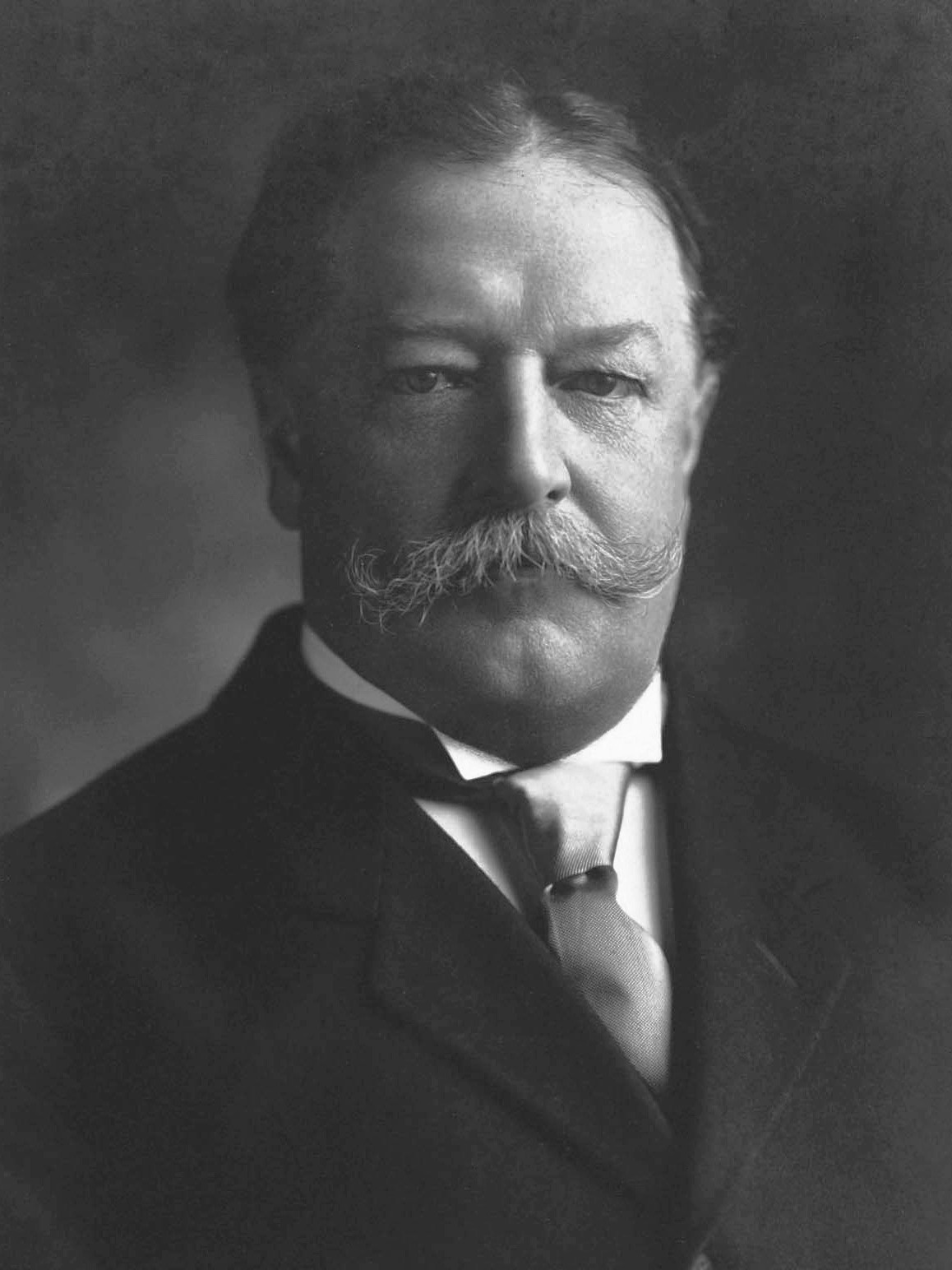

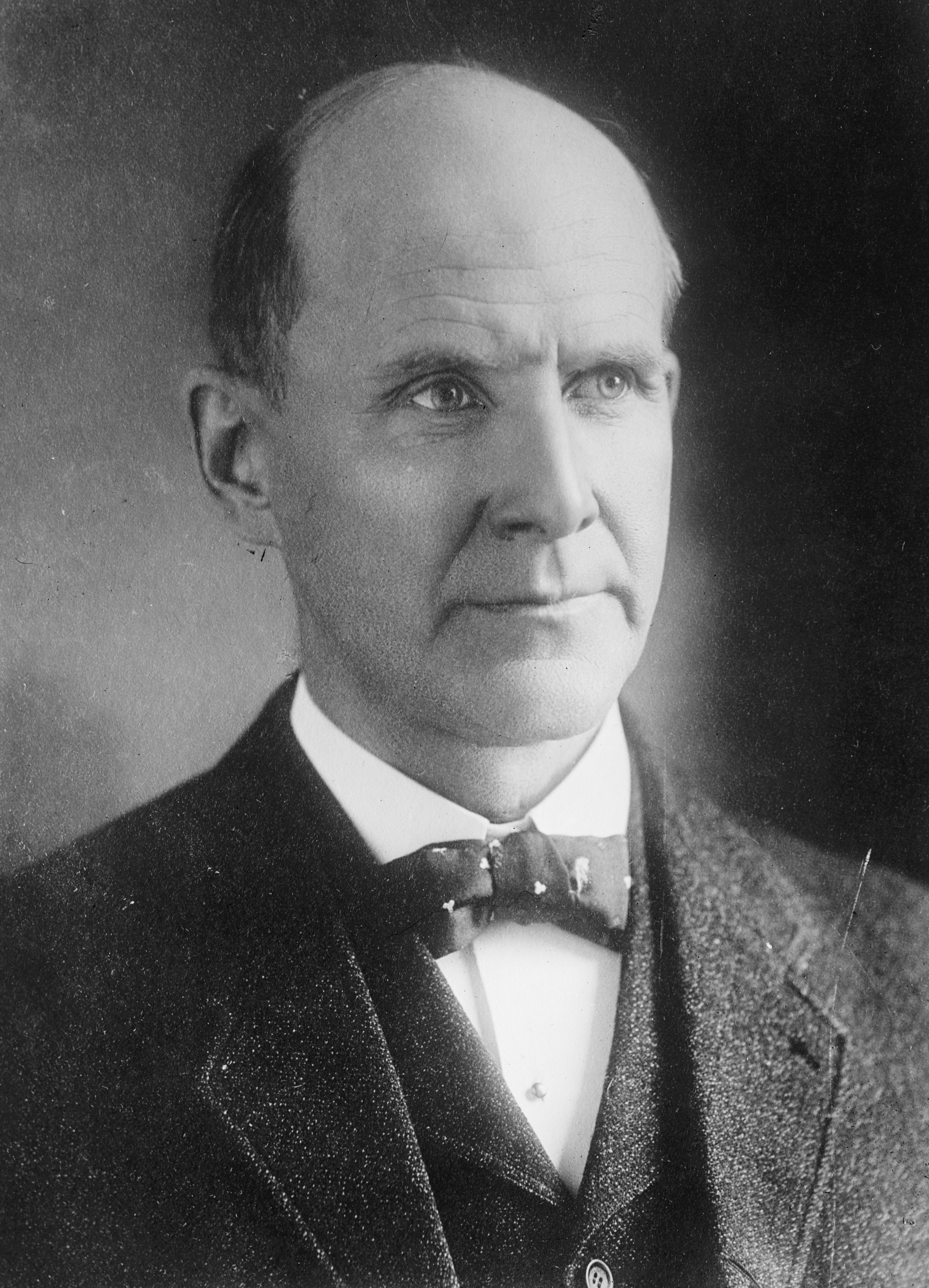
Nominee	Theodore Roosevelt	Woodrow Wilson
Party	Progressive	Democratic
Home state	New York	New Jersey
Running mate	Hiram Johnson	Thomas R. Marshall
Electoral vote	38	0
Popular vote	444,894	395,637
Percentage	36.53%	32.49%
Nominee	William Howard Taft	Eugene V. Debs
Party	Republican	Socialist
Home state	Ohio	Indiana
Running mate	Nicholas Murray Butler	Emil Seidel
Electoral vote	0	0
Popular vote	273,360	83,614
Percentage	22.45%	6.87%
County results
Roosevelt
30–40%
40–50%
50–60%
Wilson
30–40%
40–50%
50–60%
60–70%
Taft
30–40%
President before election
William Howard Taft
Republican
Elected President
Woodrow Wilson
Democratic

A presidential election was held in Pennsylvania on November 5, 1912 as part of the 1912 United States presidential election. This was the first time that Arizona and New Mexico took part in a presidential election having been admitted to the Union earlier in the year. Voters chose 38 representatives, or electors to the Electoral College, who voted for president and vice president.

This election was a four-way contest. Pennsylvania voted for the Progressive nominee former President Theodore "Teddy" Roosevelt over the Democratic nominee New Jersey Governor Woodrow Wilson, Republican nominee President William Howard Taft, and Socialist Party of America nominee union leader Eugene V. Debs. Roosevelt won Pennsylvania by a margin of 4.04%. He also became the first non-Republican candidate to win Pennsylvania since Democratic candidate and native son James Buchanan won the state in 1856.

As of the 2024 presidential election, this is the last election in which Wayne County, Snyder County, and Union County did not vote for the Republican candidate.

== Results ==
1912 United States presidential election in Pennsylvania
Party	Candidate	Votes	Percentage	Electoral votes
Progressive	Theodore Roosevelt	444,894	36.53%	38
Democratic	Woodrow Wilson	395,637	32.49%	0
Republican	William Howard Taft (incumbent)	273,360	22.45%	0
Socialist	Eugene V. Debs	83,614	6.87%	0
Prohibition	Eugene Chafin	19,525	1.60%	0
Industrialist	Arthur Reimer	706	0.06%	0
Totals		1,217,736	100.00%	38

=== Results by county ===
County	Woodrow Wilson Democratic		William Howard Taft Republican		Theodore Roosevelt Progressive "Bull Moose"		Eugene V. Debs Socialist		Eugene Chafin Prohibition		Arthur Reimer Industrialist		Margin (Note: Because in Pennsylvania as a whole Roosevelt ran first with Wilson second and both ahead of Taft, all margins given are Wilson vote minus Roosevelt vote, and percentage margin Wilson percentage minus Roosevelt percentage, unless otherwise noted.)		Total votes cast
County	#	%	#	%	#	%	#	%	#	%	#	%	#	%	Total votes cast
Adams	3,682	51.07%	819	11.36%	2,548	35.34%	90	1.25%	67	0.93%	4	0.06%	1,134	15.73%	7,210
Allegheny	31,417	24.86%	23,822	18.85%	50,017	39.57%	19,554	15.47%	1,402	1.11%	174	0.14%	-18,600	-14.72%	126,386
Armstrong	3,027	30.06%	1,904	18.91%	4,297	42.67%	643	6.39%	198	1.97%	1	0.01%	-1,270	-12.61%	10,070
Beaver	3,037	24.10%	2,759	21.89%	4,517	35.84%	1,748	13.87%	534	4.24%	7	0.06%	-1,480	-11.74%	12,602
Bedford	2,694	36.68%	1,140	15.52%	2,971	40.45%	423	5.76%	115	1.57%	1	0.01%	-277	-3.77%	7,344
Berks	16,430	47.54%	3,032	8.77%	11,284	32.65%	3,636	10.52%	160	0.46%	18	0.05%	5,146	14.89%	34,560
Blair	4,108	23.78%	3,138	18.16%	8,179	47.34%	1,599	9.26%	223	1.29%	29	0.17%	-4,071	-23.56%	17,276
Bradford	2,960	27.01%	2,034	18.56%	5,379	49.09%	238	2.17%	342	3.12%	4	0.04%	-2,419	-22.08%	10,957
Bucks	6,773	39.75%	5,452	32.00%	4,280	25.12%	411	2.41%	119	0.70%	2	0.01%	1,321 (Note: In this county where Roosevelt ran third behind both Wilson and Taft, margin given is Wilson vote minus Taft vote and percentage margin Wilson percentage minus Taft percentage.)	7.75%	17,037
Butler	4,022	35.86%	1,273	11.35%	4,327	38.58%	450	4.01%	1,139	10.16%	4	0.04%	-305	-2.72%	11,215
Cambria	7,282	33.52%	3,252	14.97%	10,066	46.33%	869	4.00%	243	1.12%	13	0.06%	-2,784	-12.81%	21,725
Cameron	291	22.58%	388	30.10%	553	42.90%	36	2.79%	20	1.55%	1	0.08%	-165 (Note: In this county where Wilson ran third behind both Taft and Roosevelt, margin given is Taft vote minus Roosevelt vote and percentage margin Taft percentage minus Roosevelt percentage.)	-12.80%	1,289
Carbon	3,652	40.88%	1,246	13.95%	3,549	39.72%	428	4.79%	57	0.64%	2	0.02%	103	1.15%	8,934
Centre	3,445	43.46%	1,507	19.01%	2,612	32.95%	227	2.86%	132	1.67%	3	0.04%	833	10.51%	7,926
Chester	6,901	34.88%	5,708	28.85%	6,596	33.34%	314	1.59%	263	1.33%	4	0.02%	305	1.54%	19,786
Clarion	3,079	49.17%	916	14.63%	1,724	27.53%	315	5.03%	224	3.58%	4	0.06%	1,355	21.64%	6,262
Clearfield	4,670	36.20%	1,523	11.81%	4,902	38.00%	1,410	10.93%	381	2.95%	14	0.11%	-232	-1.80%	12,900
Clinton	2,200	36.45%	1,214	20.12%	1,926	31.91%	613	10.16%	77	1.28%	5	0.08%	274	4.54%	6,035
Columbia	4,905	55.05%	889	9.98%	2,697	30.27%	242	2.72%	175	1.96%	2	0.02%	2,208	24.78%	8,910
Crawford	3,908	32.17%	2,497	20.56%	4,139	34.07%	1,041	8.57%	556	4.58%	6	0.05%	-231	-1.90%	12,147
Cumberland	5,023	42.89%	2,566	21.91%	3,507	29.94%	345	2.95%	262	2.24%	9	0.08%	1,516	12.94%	11,712
Dauphin	7,470	28.93%	6,012	23.29%	10,676	41.35%	1,363	5.28%	287	1.11%	11	0.04%	-3,206	-12.42%	25,819
Delaware	6,001	25.82%	8,418	36.23%	8,272	35.60%	374	1.61%	170	0.73%	3	0.01%	146	0.63%	23,238
Elk	2,057	35.82%	603	10.50%	2,638	45.94%	363	6.32%	79	1.38%	2	0.03%	-581	-10.12%	5,742
Erie	5,633	30.60%	4,958	26.93%	5,019	27.27%	1,972	10.71%	800	4.35%	26	0.14%	614	3.34%	18,408
Fayette	7,363	38.97%	4,168	22.06%	4,257	22.53%	2,462	13.03%	632	3.35%	10	0.05%	3,106	16.44%	18,892
Forest	373	23.91%	240	15.38%	588	37.69%	263	16.86%	96	6.15%	0	0.00%	-215	-13.78%	1,560
Franklin	4,505	39.10%	2,710	23.52%	3,787	32.86%	414	3.59%	105	0.91%	2	0.02%	718	6.23%	11,523
Fulton	1,080	52.25%	317	15.34%	622	30.09%	23	1.11%	24	1.16%	1	0.05%	458	22.16%	2,067
Greene	3,551	58.67%	1,150	19.00%	1,063	17.56%	176	2.91%	109	1.80%	3	0.05%	2,401	39.67%	6,052
Huntingdon	1,538	24.41%	903	14.33%	3,493	55.44%	263	4.17%	102	1.62%	1	0.02%	-1,955	-31.03%	6,300
Indiana	1,593	18.72%	1,720	20.21%	3,969	46.64%	524	6.16%	695	8.17%	9	0.11%	-2,249	-26.43%	8,510
Jefferson	2,510	29.11%	1,608	18.65%	3,501	40.61%	572	6.63%	430	4.99%	1	0.01%	-991	-11.49%	8,622
Juniata	1,148	40.91%	374	13.33%	1,184	42.20%	73	2.60%	27	0.96%	0	0.00%	-36	-1.28%	2,806
Lackawanna	12,423	37.78%	3,799	11.55%	15,199	46.22%	959	2.92%	489	1.49%	14	0.04%	-2,776	-8.44%	32,883
Lancaster	8,574	25.01%	12,668	36.95%	12,031	35.09%	687	2.00%	310	0.90%	12	0.04%	637	1.86%	34,282
Lawrence	1,976	20.07%	2,128	21.62%	3,348	34.01%	1,641	16.67%	749	7.61%	3	0.03%	-1,220	-12.39%	9,845
Lebanon	2,972	28.09%	2,378	22.48%	4,540	42.91%	393	3.71%	296	2.80%	1	0.01%	-1,568	-14.82%	10,580
Lehigh	10,834	48.56%	2,722	12.20%	7,580	33.97%	1,059	4.75%	106	0.48%	10	0.04%	3,254	14.58%	22,311
Luzerne	13,461	32.56%	4,970	12.02%	20,104	48.63%	2,464	5.96%	320	0.77%	19	0.05%	-6,643	-16.07%	41,338
Lycoming	6,039	40.73%	1,631	11.00%	5,208	35.13%	1,523	10.27%	423	2.85%	3	0.02%	831	5.60%	14,827
McKean	2,362	29.52%	1,345	16.81%	3,489	43.61%	512	6.40%	275	3.44%	18	0.22%	-1,127	-14.09%	8,001
Mercer	4,039	31.76%	1,873	14.73%	4,418	34.74%	1,708	13.43%	677	5.32%	3	0.02%	-379	-2.98%	12,718
Mifflin	1,400	31.25%	654	14.60%	1,831	40.87%	531	11.85%	62	1.38%	2	0.04%	-431	-9.62%	4,480
Monroe	3,107	67.48%	536	11.64%	844	18.33%	23	0.50%	93	2.02%	1	0.02%	2,263	49.15%	4,604
Montgomery	11,894	35.37%	8,978	26.69%	11,491	34.17%	1,129	3.36%	136	0.40%	4	0.01%	403	1.20%	33,632
Montour	1,492	53.19%	308	10.98%	937	33.40%	39	1.39%	29	1.03%	0	0.00%	555	19.79%	2,805
Northampton	10,325	47.50%	3,893	17.91%	6,602	30.37%	639	2.94%	274	1.26%	3	0.01%	3,723	17.13%	21,736
Northumberland	6,802	35.53%	2,371	12.39%	7,064	36.90%	2,726	14.24%	172	0.90%	9	0.05%	-262	-1.37%	19,144
Perry	1,941	39.98%	1,140	23.48%	1,670	34.40%	72	1.48%	28	0.58%	4	0.08%	271	5.58%	4,855
Philadelphia	66,308	26.35%	91,944	36.53%	82,963	32.96%	9,784	3.89%	571	0.23%	120	0.05%	8,981	3.57%	251,690
Pike	995	59.83%	191	11.49%	437	26.28%	18	1.08%	20	1.20%	2	0.12%	558	33.55%	1,663
Potter	1,445	30.88%	850	18.17%	1,907	40.76%	310	6.63%	167	3.57%	0	0.00%	-462	-9.87%	4,679
Schuylkill	11,812	36.83%	3,557	11.09%	13,686	42.67%	2,846	8.87%	161	0.50%	13	0.04%	-1,874	-5.84%	32,075
Snyder	991	29.76%	626	18.80%	1,622	48.71%	74	2.22%	14	0.42%	3	0.09%	-631	-18.95%	3,330
Somerset	2,164	22.57%	1,428	14.89%	5,026	52.42%	655	6.83%	314	3.27%	1	0.01%	-2,862	-29.85%	9,588
Sullivan	912	44.12%	547	26.46%	472	22.84%	43	2.08%	88	4.26%	5	0.24%	365	17.66%	2,067
Susquehanna	2,588	34.98%	1,988	26.87%	2,498	33.77%	25	0.34%	298	4.03%	1	0.01%	90	1.22%	7,398
Tioga	1,901	22.48%	1,895	22.40%	4,314	51.00%	130	1.54%	217	2.57%	1	0.01%	-2,413	-28.53%	8,458
Union	1,126	32.50%	470	13.56%	1,776	51.26%	48	1.39%	42	1.21%	3	0.09%	-650	-18.76%	3,465
Venango	2,507	27.57%	1,660	18.26%	3,111	34.22%	1,214	13.35%	599	6.59%	1	0.01%	-604	-6.64%	9,092
Warren	1,686	23.23%	1,564	21.55%	2,934	40.42%	628	8.65%	439	6.05%	7	0.10%	-1,248	-17.19%	7,258
Washington	5,563	29.75%	4,297	22.98%	6,395	34.20%	2,050	10.96%	385	2.06%	7	0.04%	-832	-4.45%	18,697
Wayne	1,924	35.90%	659	12.29%	2,594	48.40%	52	0.97%	129	2.41%	2	0.04%	-670	-12.50%	5,360
Westmoreland	9,262	31.58%	4,299	14.66%	10,193	34.76%	4,622	15.76%	900	3.07%	49	0.17%	-931	-3.17%	29,325
Wyoming	1,505	42.60%	480	13.59%	1,464	41.44%	33	0.93%	51	1.44%	0	0.00%	41	1.16%	3,533
York	14,979	49.61%	5,251	17.39%	8,007	26.52%	1,503	4.98%	446	1.48%	9	0.03%	6,972	23.09%	30,195
Totals	395,637	32.49%	273,360	22.45%	444,894	36.53%	83,614	6.87%	19,525	1.60%	706	0.06%	-49,257	-4.04%	1,217,736

== See also ==
- United States presidential elections in Pennsylvania
