= Union County, Pennsylvania =

County in Pennsylvania, United States

- County
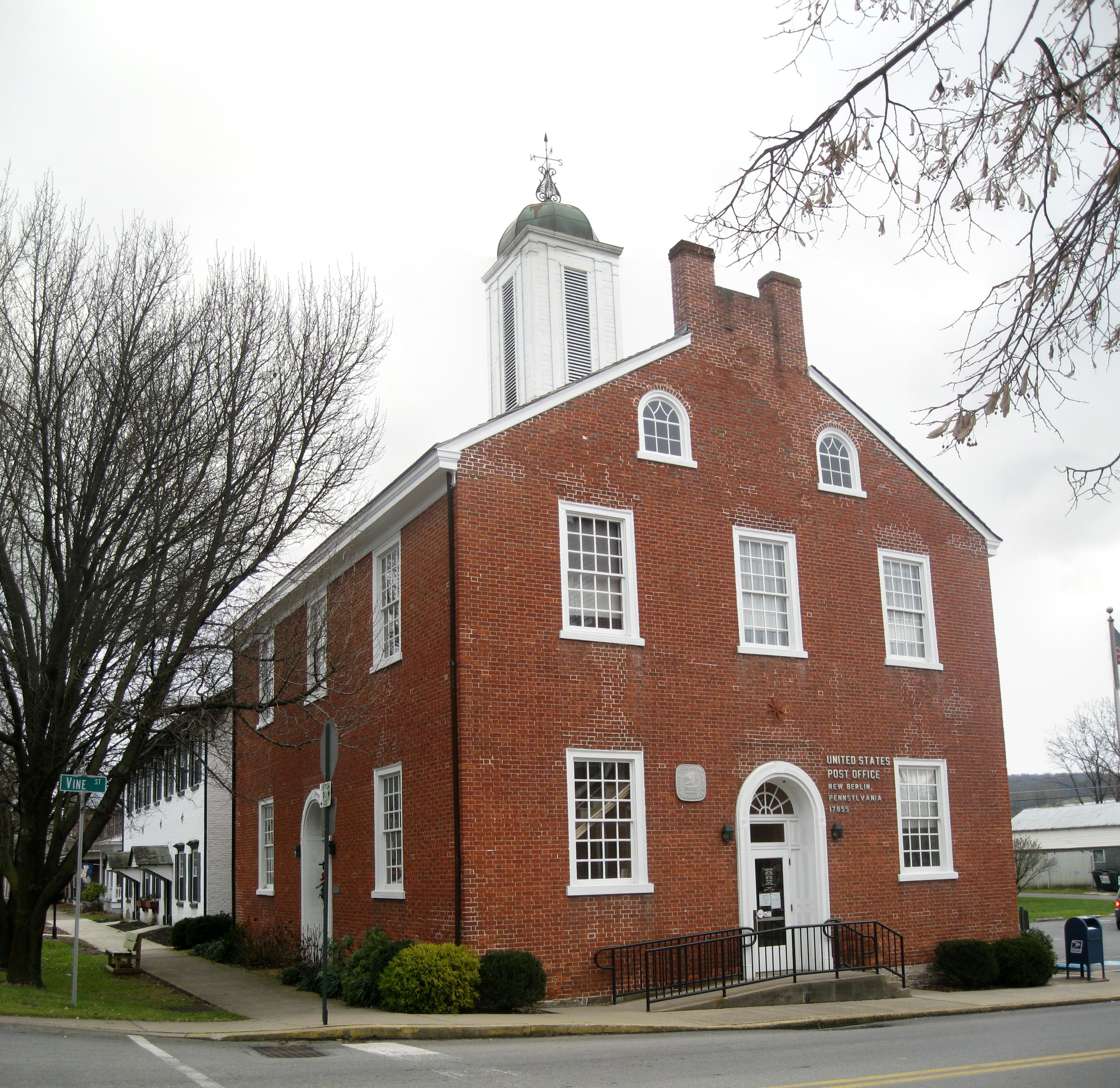
- Old Union County Courthouse in New Berlin

- Logo

- Location within the U.S. state of Pennsylvania
- Coordinates: 40°58′N 77°04′W
- Country: United States
- State: Pennsylvania
- Founded: March 22, 1813
- Seat: Lewisburg
- Largest borough: Lewisburg

Area
  - Total: 318 sq mi (820 km^{2})
  - Land: 316 sq mi (820 km^{2})
  - Water: 1.8 sq mi (4.7 km^{2}) 0.6%

Population (2020)
  - Total: 42,681
  - Estimate (2025): 42,313 ▼
  - Density: 142/sq mi (55/km^{2})
- Time zone: UTC−5 (Eastern)
  - Summer (DST): UTC−4 (EDT)
- Congressional district: 15th
- Website: www.unioncountypa.org

Union County is a county in the Commonwealth of Pennsylvania. As of the 2020 census, the population was 42,681. Its county seat is Lewisburg. The county was created on March 22, 1813, from part of Northumberland County. Its name is an allusion to the federal Union. Mifflinburg was established by legislation as the first county seat until it was moved to New Berlin in 1815. Lewisburg became county seat in 1855 and has remained so since. Union County comprises the Lewisburg, PA Micropolitan Statistical Area, which is also included in the Bloomsburg-Berwick-Sunbury, PA Combined Statistical Area. The county is part of the Central Pennsylvania region of the state. (Note: Includes Centre, Lycoming, Northumberland, Columbia, Mifflin, Union, Snyder, Clinton, Juniata and Montour Counties)

== Geography ==
According to the U.S. Census Bureau, the county has a total area of 318 square miles (820 km^{2}), of which 316 square miles (820 km^{2}) is land and 1.8 square miles (4.7 km^{2}) (0.6%) is water. It is the fourth-smallest county in Pennsylvania by area. Union has a humid continental climate (Dfa/Dfb) and average temperatures in Lewisburg range from 27.2 °F in January to 72.7 °F in July, while in Hartleton they range from 26.4 °F in January to 72.1 °F in July. Union County is one of the 423 counties served by the Appalachian Regional Commission, and it is identified as part of the "Midlands" by Colin Woodard in his book American Nations: A History of the Eleven Rival Regional Cultures of North America.

=== Adjacent counties ===
- Lycoming County (north)
- Northumberland County (east)
- Snyder County (south)
- Mifflin County (southwest)
- Centre County (west)
- Clinton County (northwest)

=== State protected areas ===
- R. B. Winter State Park
- Sand Bridge State Park
- Shikellamy State Park's overlook is in Union County. The marina is across the Susquehanna River in Northumberland County.

=== Major highways ===
- I-80
- US 15
- PA 44
- PA 45
- PA 104
- PA 192
- PA 235
- PA 304

== Demographics ==
Historical population
Census	Pop.	Note	%±
1820	18,619		—
1830	20,795		11.7%
1840	22,787		9.6%
1850	26,083		14.5%
1860	14,145		−45.8%
1870	15,565		10.0%
1880	16,905		8.6%
1890	17,820		5.4%
1900	17,592		−1.3%
1910	16,249		−7.6%
1920	15,850		−2.5%
1930	17,468		10.2%
1940	20,247		15.9%
1950	23,150		14.3%
1960	25,646		10.8%
1970	28,603		11.5%
1980	32,870		14.9%
1990	36,176		10.1%
2000	41,624		15.1%
2010	44,947		8.0%
2020	42,681		−5.0%
2025 (est.)	42,313	▼	−0.9%
U.S. Decennial Census; 1790–1960 1900–1990; 1990–2000 2010–2017 2010-2020

=== Racial and ethnic composition ===
Union County, Pennsylvania – Racial and ethnic composition Note: the US Census treats Hispanic/Latino as an ethnic category. This table excludes Latinos from the racial categories and assigns them to a separate category. Hispanics/Latinos may be of any race.
Race / Ethnicity (NH = Non-Hispanic)	Pop 1980	Pop 1990	Pop 2000	Pop 2010	Pop 2020	% 1980	% 1990	% 2000	% 2010	% 2020
White alone (NH)	31,547	34,376	36,455	38,311	36,050	95.98%	95.02%	87.58%	85.24%	84.46%
Black or African American alone (NH)	907	858	2,640	3,048	2,459	2.76%	2.37%	6.34%	6.78%	5.76%
Native American or Alaska Native alone (NH)	27	64	64	125	82	0.08%	0.18%	0.15%	0.28%	0.19%
Asian alone (NH)	109	230	427	520	814	0.33%	0.64%	1.03%	1.16%	1.91%
Native Hawaiian or Pacific Islander alone (NH)	x	x	17	21	8	x	x	0.04%	0.05%	0.02%
Other race alone (NH)	59	10	19	51	112	0.18%	0.03%	0.05%	0.11%	0.26%
Mixed race or Multiracial (NH)	x	x	380	525	1,156	x	x	0.91%	1.17%	2.71%
Hispanic or Latino (any race)	221	638	1,622	2,346	2,000	0.67%	1.76%	3.90%	5.22%	4.69%
Total	32,870	36,176	41,624	44,947	42,681	100.00%	100.00%	100.00%	100.00%	100.00%

=== 2020 census ===
As of the 2020 census, the county had a population of 42,681. The median age was 39.5 years. 18.7% of residents were under the age of 18 and 18.8% of residents were 65 years of age or older. For every 100 females there were 112.8 males, and for every 100 females age 18 and over there were 114.2 males age 18 and over.

The racial makeup of the county was 86.6% White, 6.1% Black or African American, 0.2% American Indian and Alaska Native, 1.9% Asian, <0.1% Native Hawaiian and Pacific Islander, 1.4% from some other race, and 3.7% from two or more races. Hispanic or Latino residents of any race comprised 4.7% of the population.

36.8% of residents lived in urban areas, while 63.2% lived in rural areas.

There were 14,523 households in the county, of which 28.1% had children under the age of 18 living in them. Of all households, 54.1% were married-couple households, 15.1% were households with a male householder and no spouse or partner present, and 24.5% were households with a female householder and no spouse or partner present. About 27.9% of all households were made up of individuals and 14.2% had someone living alone who was 65 years of age or older.

There were 16,082 housing units, of which 9.7% were vacant. Among occupied housing units, 71.7% were owner-occupied and 28.3% were renter-occupied. The homeowner vacancy rate was 1.3% and the rental vacancy rate was 6.7%.

=== 2000 census ===
As of the census of 2000, there were 41,624 people, 13,178 households, and 9,211 families residing in the county. The population density was 131 people per square mile (51 people/km^{2}). There were 14,684 housing units at an average density of 46 units per square mile (18/km^{2}). The racial makeup of the county was 90.08% White, 6.91% Black or African American, 0.16% Native American, 1.06% Asian, 0.04% Pacific Islander, 0.37% from other races, and 1.37% from two or more races. 3.90% of the population were Hispanic or Latino of any race. 41.2% were of German, 13.9% American, 6.5% Irish, 5.9% English and 5.3% Italian ancestry. 90.4% spoke English, 3.7% Spanish, 2.0% Pennsylvania Dutch and 1.2% German as their first language.

There were 13,178 households, out of which 31.10% had children under the age of 18 living with them, 59.90% were married couples living together, 6.90% had a female householder with no husband present, and 30.10% were non-families. 25.30% of all households were made up of individuals, and 11.80% had someone living alone who was 65 years of age or older. The average household size was 2.50 and the average family size was 3.00.

In the county, the population was spread out, with 20.10% under the age of 18, 13.90% from 18 to 24, 30.90% from 25 to 44, 21.70% from 45 to 64, and 13.40% who were 65 years of age or older. The median age was 36 years. For every 100 females there were 123.90 males. For every 100 females age 18 and over, there were 128.50 males.

== Micropolitan Statistical Area ==
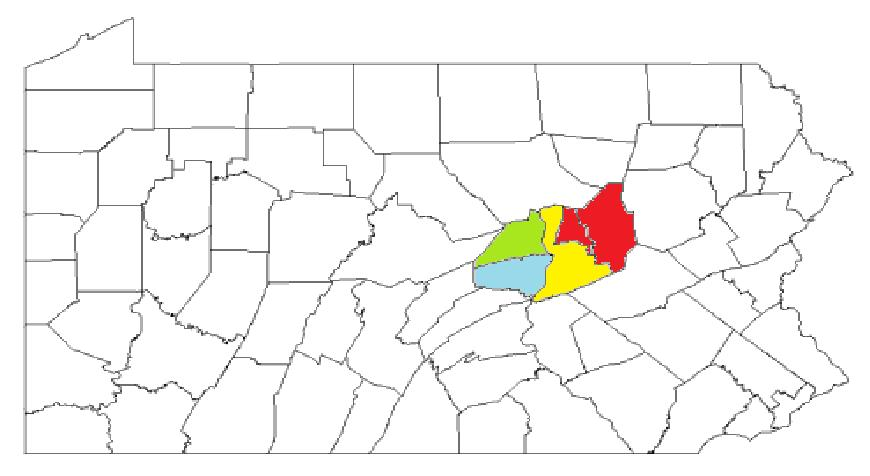
Map of the Bloomsburg–Berwick–Sunbury, PA Combined Statistical Area (CSA), composed of the following parts: Bloomsburg–Berwick, PA Metropolitan Statistical Area (MSA) Sunbury, PA Micropolitan Statistical Area (μSA) Lewisburg, PA Micropolitan Statistical Area (μSA) Selinsgrove, PA Micropolitan Statistical Area (μSA)

The United States Office of Management and Budget has designated Union County as the Lewisburg, PA Micropolitan Statistical Area (μSA). As of the 2010 census the micropolitan area ranked 12th most populous in the State of Pennsylvania and the 263rd most populous in the United States with a population of 44,947. Union County is also a part of the Bloomsburg–Berwick–Sunbury, PA Combined Statistical Area (CSA), which combines the populations of Union County, as well as Columbia, Montour, Northumberland and Snyder Counties in Pennsylvania. The Combined Statistical Area ranked 8th in the State of Pennsylvania and 115th most populous in the United States with a population of 264,739.

== Government ==
=== County commissioners ===
- Preston Boop (R)
- Jeff Reber (R)
- Stacy Richards (D)

=== State government ===
- Stephanie Borowicz – State Representative, Pennsylvania House of Representatives, District 76
- Jamie Flick - State Representative, Pennsylvania House of Representatives, District 83
- David H. Rowe – State Representative, Pennsylvania House of Representatives, District 85
- Gene Yaw – State Senator, Pennsylvania Senate, District 23

=== Federal level ===
- Glenn “G.T.” Thompson, Republican, Pennsylvania's 15th Congressional District in 2023 after redistricting.
- Dave McCormick, US Senator
- John Fetterman, US Senator

== Politics ==
United States presidential election results for Union County, Pennsylvania
Year	Republican		Democratic		Third party(ies)	
Year	No.	%	No.	%	No.	%
1888	2,448	59.85%	1,582	38.68%	60	1.47%
1892	2,308	58.02%	1,569	39.44%	101	2.54%
1896	2,585	65.63%	1,186	30.11%	168	4.27%
1900	2,810	65.82%	1,359	31.83%	100	2.34%
1904	2,548	69.26%	1,034	28.11%	97	2.64%
1908	2,547	66.89%	1,154	30.30%	107	2.81%
1912	470	13.56%	1,126	32.50%	1,869	53.94%
1916	1,902	58.06%	1,272	38.83%	102	3.11%
1920	3,305	71.38%	1,155	24.95%	170	3.67%
1924	3,707	71.59%	1,209	23.35%	262	5.06%
1928	5,708	87.45%	765	11.72%	54	0.83%
1932	3,534	61.63%	1,948	33.97%	252	4.39%
1936	5,589	64.97%	2,946	34.25%	67	0.78%
1940	5,612	71.43%	2,220	28.26%	25	0.32%
1944	5,585	76.19%	1,704	23.25%	41	0.56%
1948	5,058	76.79%	1,442	21.89%	87	1.32%
1952	6,558	80.16%	1,610	19.68%	13	0.16%
1956	6,620	78.08%	1,844	21.75%	14	0.17%
1960	7,466	78.82%	1,993	21.04%	13	0.14%
1964	4,944	53.65%	4,262	46.25%	10	0.11%
1968	6,422	69.69%	2,178	23.64%	615	6.67%
1972	6,905	73.57%	2,278	24.27%	202	2.15%
1976	6,309	63.71%	3,405	34.39%	188	1.90%
1980	6,798	66.28%	2,687	26.20%	771	7.52%
1984	7,792	73.66%	2,747	25.97%	40	0.38%
1988	7,912	71.05%	3,163	28.40%	61	0.55%
1992	6,362	51.87%	3,623	29.54%	2,280	18.59%
1996	6,570	56.04%	3,658	31.20%	1,496	12.76%
2000	8,523	64.69%	4,209	31.95%	443	3.36%
2004	10,334	64.09%	5,700	35.35%	89	0.55%
2008	9,859	56.42%	7,333	41.96%	283	1.62%
2012	9,896	60.57%	6,109	37.39%	332	2.03%
2016	10,622	60.02%	6,180	34.92%	894	5.05%
2020	12,356	61.19%	7,475	37.02%	361	1.79%
2024	12,969	61.01%	8,015	37.71%	273	1.28%

United States Senate election results for Union County, Pennsylvania1
Year	Republican		Democratic		Third party(ies)	
Year	No.	%	No.	%	No.	%
1994	5,673	61.19%	3,182	34.32%	416	4.49%
2000	9,041	69.98%	3,468	26.84%	411	3.18%
2006	6,614	57.56%	4,876	42.44%	0	0.00%
2012	9,592	59.67%	6,112	38.02%	370	2.30%
2018	8,317	57.59%	5,901	40.86%	223	1.54%
2024	12,747	60.49%	7,872	37.36%	453	2.15%

United States Senate election results for Union County, Pennsylvania3
Year	Republican		Democratic		Third party(ies)	
Year	No.	%	No.	%	No.	%
1992	6,653	54.74%	4,631	38.10%	870	7.16%
1998	5,927	73.32%	1,872	23.16%	285	3.53%
2004	9,976	63.32%	4,732	30.04%	1,046	6.64%
2010	7,618	65.24%	4,059	34.76%	0	0.00%
2016	10,568	60.39%	6,092	34.81%	841	4.81%
2022	9,401	58.41%	6,249	38.83%	444	2.76%

Pennsylvania Gubernatorial election results for Union County
Year	Republican		Democratic		Third party(ies)	
Year	No.	%	No.	%	No.	%
1970	4,533	62.02%	2,475	33.86%	301	4.12%
1974	4,905	66.04%	2,434	32.77%	88	1.18%
1978	6,079	75.11%	1,944	24.02%	71	0.88%
1982	4,791	57.07%	3,564	42.45%	40	0.48%
1986	4,882	62.71%	2,810	36.10%	93	1.19%
1990	2,440	34.20%	4,694	65.80%	0	0.00%
1994	5,539	60.89%	2,445	26.88%	1,113	12.23%
1998	5,395	68.20%	1,700	21.49%	815	10.30%
2002	6,058	63.93%	3,153	33.27%	265	2.80%
2006	6,503	56.50%	5,006	43.50%	0	0.00%
2010	8,121	68.89%	3,668	31.11%	0	0.00%
2014	5,362	52.85%	4,784	47.15%	0	0.00%
2018	7,676	53.32%	6,426	44.64%	294	2.04%
2022	8,897	55.22%	6,898	42.81%	318	1.97%

Andrew Jackson was the last Democratic Party candidate to win the county, in 1832. The county has been solidly Republican in Presidential elections since John C. Frémont's win against James Buchanan in 1856. The only exception was William Howard Taft's loss to Theodore Roosevelt of the Bull Moose (Progressive) Party – which had splintered from the Republican Party – in 1912. The county has also voted for Republican Senators, State Treasurers, and State Auditors for decades. Robert P. Casey is the only Democratic gubernatorial candidate to win the county in the last fifty years. The county seat of Lewisburg is heavily Democratic, having given Joe Biden over 70% of its vote in 2020. However, the rest of the county is overwhelmingly Republican.

== Education ==
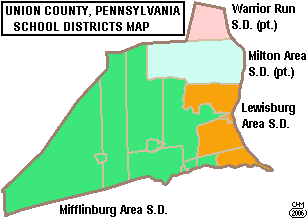
Map of Union County, Pennsylvania Public School Districts

=== Public school districts ===
School districts with portions of the county include:

- Lewisburg Area School District
  - Lewisburg Area High School
- Mifflinburg Area School District
  - Mifflinburg Area High School
- Milton Area School District (also in Northumberland County)
  - Milton Area High School
- Warrior Run School District (also in Montour and Northumberland Counties)
  - Warrior Run High School

=== Vocational school ===
- SUN Area Technical Institute - New Berlin

=== Higher education ===
- Bucknell University - Lewisburg

=== Private schools ===
- Beaver Run School - Lewisburg
- Bridgeville Parochial School - Mifflinburg
- Buffalo Creek Parochial School - Mifflinburg
- Calvary Holiness Academy - Millmont
- Camp Mount Luther - Mifflinburg
- County Line Amish School - Winfield
- East End Parochial School - Lewisburg
- Green Grove School - Mifflinburg
- Hartleton Mennonite School - Millmont
- Kumon Math and Learning of Lewisburg
- Limestone Valley Parochial School - Mifflinburg
- Morningstar Mennonite School - Mifflinburg
- Mountain Laurel School
- Mountain View Parochial School
- Norbrld Area Head Start Central Susquehanna Intermediate Unit 16
- Ridge View Parochial School
- Shady Grove Christian School
- Snyder Union Mifflin Child Development - Mifflinburg
- Sunnyside School - Millmont
- Union Co ARC Child Development Center - Lewisburg
- Union Co CC and Learning Center - Lewisburg
- White Springs School - Mifflinburg

== Communities ==
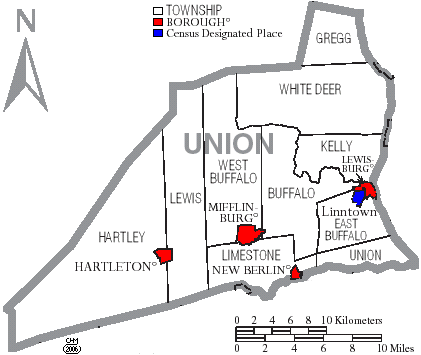
Map of Union County, Pennsylvania with municipal labels showing boroughs (red), townships (white), and census-designated places (blue)

Under Pennsylvania law, there are four types of incorporated municipalities: cities, boroughs, townships, and, in most cases, towns. The following boroughs and townships are located in Union County:

=== Boroughs ===
- Hartleton
- Lewisburg (county seat)
- Mifflinburg
- New Berlin

=== Townships ===
- Buffalo
- East Buffalo
- Gregg
- Hartley
- Kelly
- Lewis
- Limestone
- Union
- West Buffalo
- White Deer

=== Census-designated places ===
Census-designated places are geographical areas designated by the U.S. Census Bureau for the purposes of compiling demographic data. They are not actual jurisdictions under Pennsylvania law. Other unincorporated communities, such as villages, may be listed here as well.

- Allenwood
- Laurelton
- Linntown
- New Columbia
- Vicksburg
- West Milton
- Winfield

=== Population ranking ===
The population ranking of the following table is based on the 2010 census of Union County.

† county seat

Rank	City/Town/etc.	Municipal type	Population (2010 Census)
1	† Lewisburg	Borough	5,792
2	Mifflinburg	Borough	3,540
3	Linntown	CDP	1,489
4	New Columbia	CDP	1,013
T-5	West Milton	CDP	900
T-5	Winfield	CDP	900
6	New Berlin	Borough	873
7	Allenwood	CDP	321
8	Hartleton	Borough	283
9	Vicksburg	CDP	261
10	Laurelton	CDP	221

== See also ==
- National Register of Historic Places listings in Union County, Pennsylvania
