= West Buffalo, Ohio =

Ohian ghost town

Coordinates: 41°30′50″N 84°41′44″W

West Buffalo is a ghost town in Williams County, in the U.S. state of Ohio.

== History ==
West Buffalo was platted in 1836. A post office called West Buffalo was established in 1854, and remained in operation until 1874. With the construction of the railroad, business activity shifted to other nearby communities, and the town's population dwindled. West Buffalo Cemetery marks the site.
