= White Deer Township, Pennsylvania =

Township in Pennsylvania, US

Coordinates: 41°04′00″N 76°52′28″W

- Township
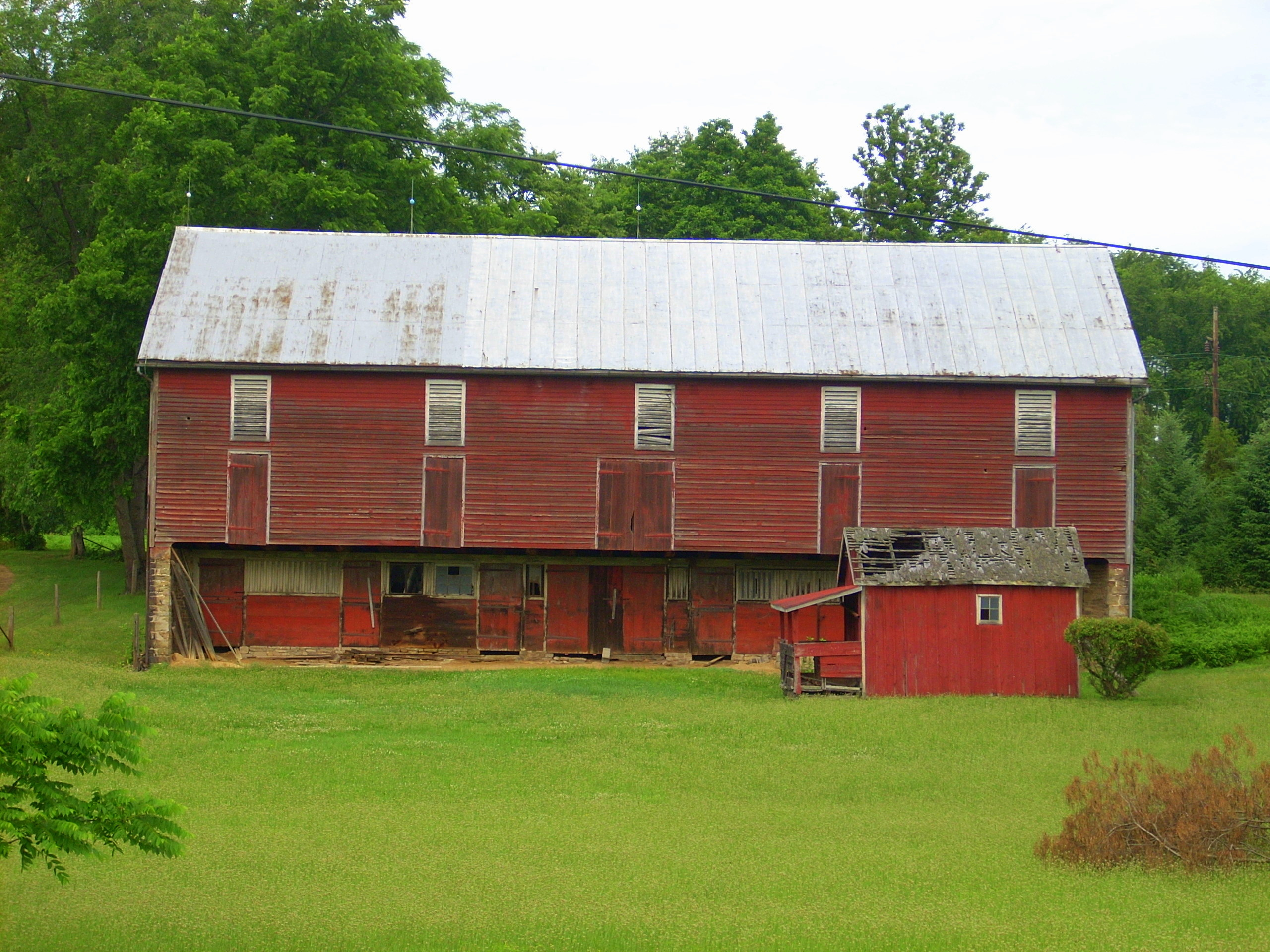
- An old red barn in White Deer Township

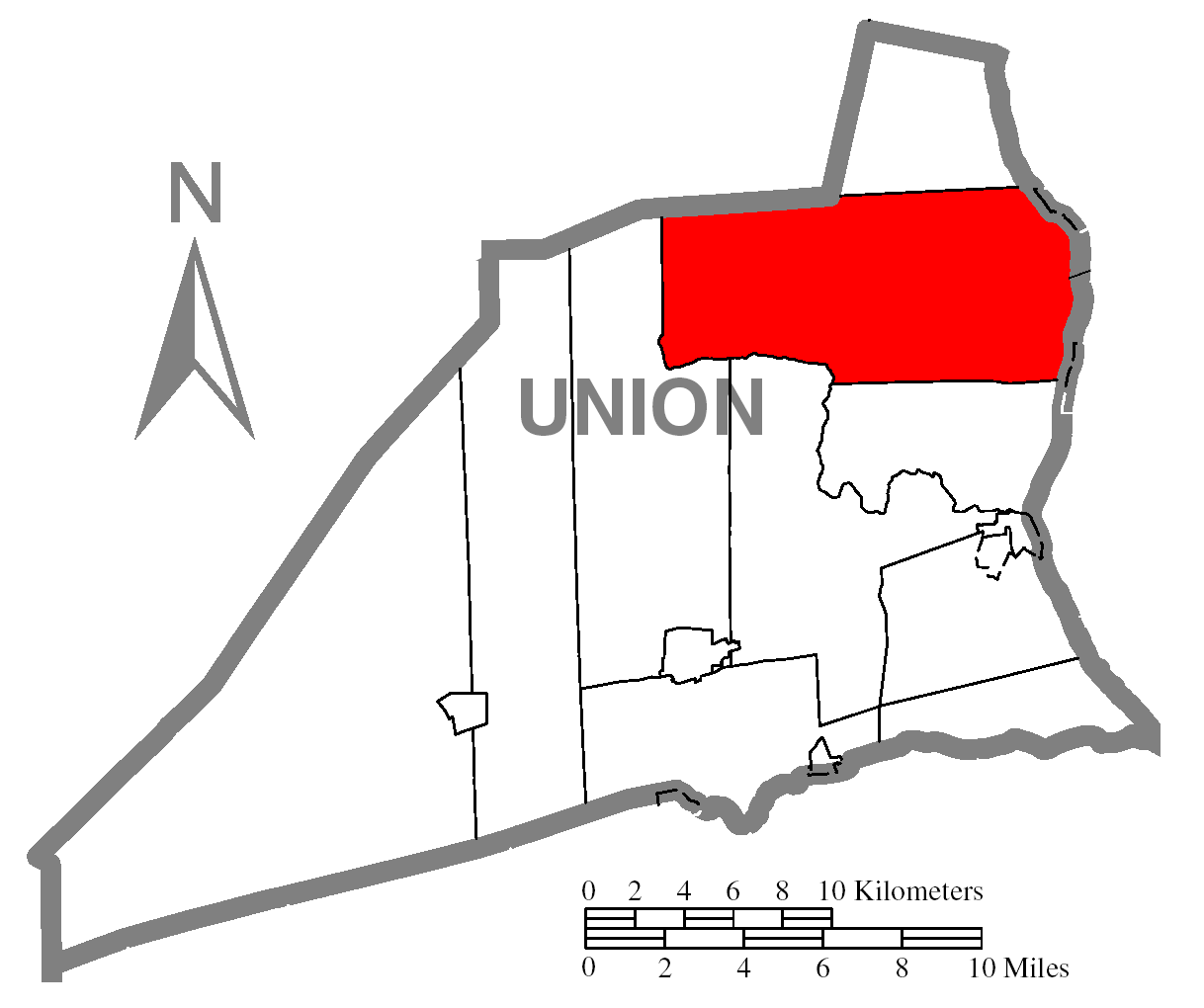
- Map of Union County, Pennsylvania highlighting White Deer Township

- Map of Pennsylvania highlighting Union County
- Country: United States
- State: Pennsylvania
- County: Union
- Settled: 1772
- Incorporated: 1776

Area
  - Total: 46.43 sq mi (120.26 km^{2})
  - Land: 46.17 sq mi (119.58 km^{2})
  - Water: 0.26 sq mi (0.68 km^{2})

Population (2020)
  - Total: 4,331 ▼
  - Estimate (2021): 4,323
  - Density: 99.6/sq mi (38.45/km^{2})
- Time zone: UTC-5 (EST)
  - Summer (DST): UTC-4 (EDT)
- ZIP code: 17887
- Area codes: 272 and 570
- FIPS code: 42-119-84496
- Website: https://whitedeertownship.org/

White Deer Township is a township in Union County, Pennsylvania, United States. The population was 4,331 at the 2020 census.

== History ==
The Watsontown River Bridge and Factory Bridge are listed on the National Register of Historic Places.

== Geography ==
According to the United States Census Bureau, the township has a total area of 46.6 square miles (120.7 km^{2}), of which 46.5 square miles (120.4 km^{2}) is land and 0.1 square mile (0.3 km^{2}) (0.21%) is water.

White Deer Township is bordered by Lycoming County and Gregg Township to the north, the West Branch Susquehanna River to the east over which lies Northumberland County, Kelly and Buffalo Townships to the south and West Buffalo Township to the west. Within White Deer Township are the unincorporated communities of White Deer and New Columbia, plus a portion of West Milton.

== Demographics ==
Historical population
Census	Pop.	Note	%±
2000	4,273		—
2010	4,437		3.8%
2020	4,331		−2.4%
2021 (est.)	4,323		−0.2%
U.S. Decennial Census

As of the census of 2000, there were 4,273 people, 1,644 households, and 1,269 families residing in the township. The population density was 91.9 inhabitants per square mile (35.5/km^{2}). There were 1,734 housing units at an average density of 37.3 per square mile (14.4/km^{2}). The racial makeup of the township was 98.15% White, 0.61% African American, 0.21% Asian, 0.26% from other races, and 0.77% from two or more races. Hispanic or Latino of any race were 0.70% of the population.

There were 1,644 households, out of which 32.4% had children under the age of 18 living with them, 65.3% were married couples living together, 7.3% had a female householder with no husband present, and 22.8% were non-families. 18.9% of all households were made up of individuals, and 8.0% had someone living alone who was 65 years of age or older. The average household size was 2.59 and the average family size was 2.94.

In the township the population was spread out, with 24.0% under the age of 18, 6.8% from 18 to 24, 28.9% from 25 to 44, 27.5% from 45 to 64, and 12.8% who were 65 years of age or older. The median age was 40 years. For every 100 females, there were 101.4 males. For every 100 females age 18 and over, there were 97.4 males.

The median income for a household in the township was $41,994, and the median income for a family was $46,417. Males had a median income of $32,222 versus $21,219 for females. The per capita income for the township was $18,486. About 4.7% of families and 4.7% of the population were below the poverty line, including 5.2% of those under age 18 and 3.3% of those age 65 or over.

== Government ==
The township has four polling places. White Deer Township 1 is in the Township Municipal Building, 2191 Creek Rd., New Columbia. White Deer Township 2 is located in the New Columbia Community Center, 224 3rd St., New Columbia. White Deer Township 3 is located in the Community Park Building, 992 White Deer Pike, White Deer. White Deer Township 4 is found in the Revival Tabernacle, Social Hall, 214 Tabernacle Rd., New Columbia.

== Education ==
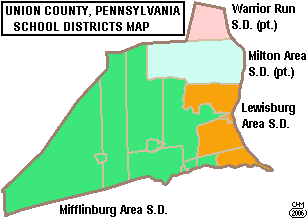
Map of Union County, Pennsylvania Public School Districts

The local public school system is the Milton Area School District. Several alternative schools, including parochial and charter, are available in the region.
