= Limestone Township, Union County, Pennsylvania =

Township in Pennsylvania, US

Coordinates: 40°52′29″N 76°59′58″W

- Township
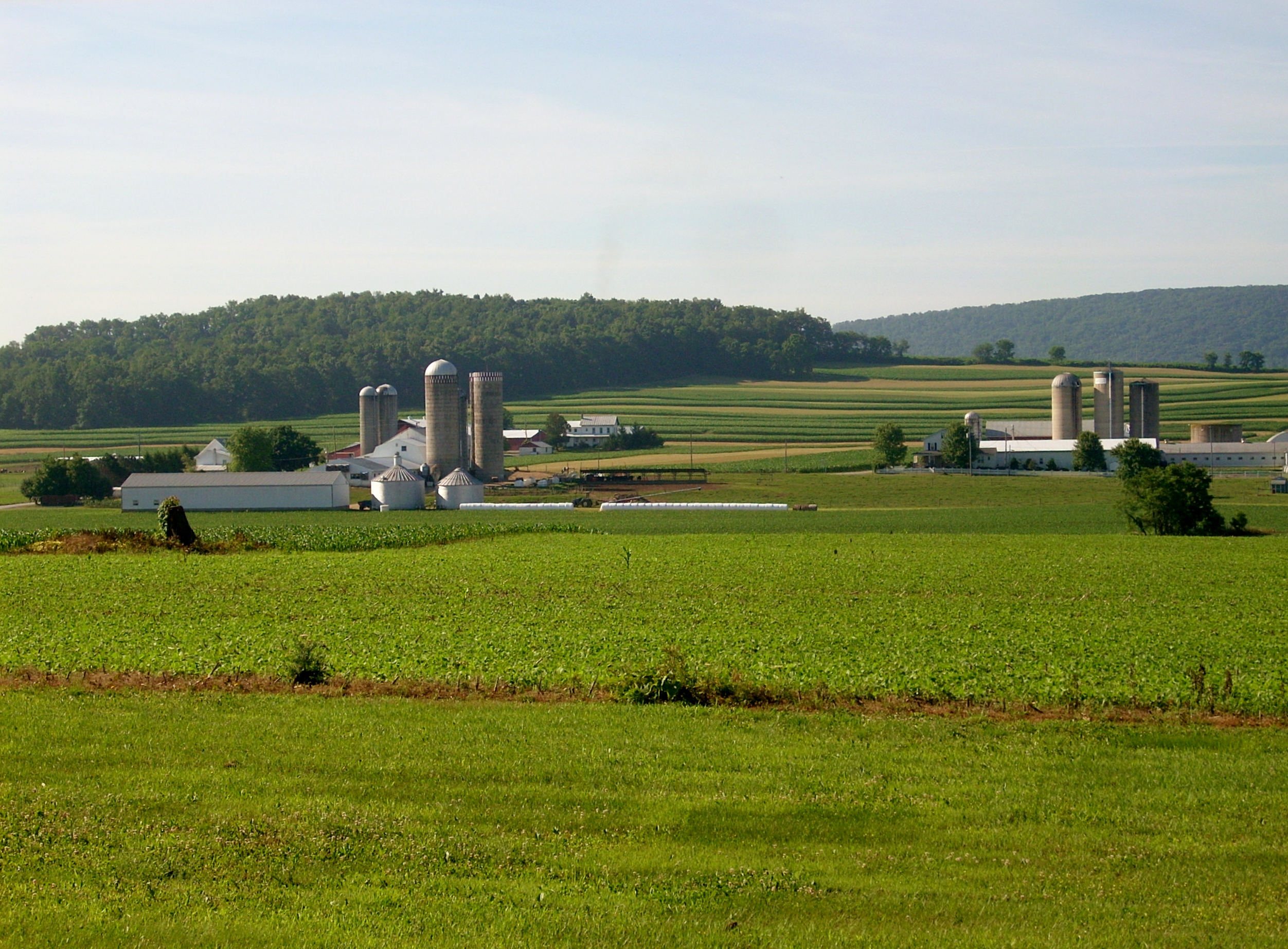
- Dairy farms in Limestone Township

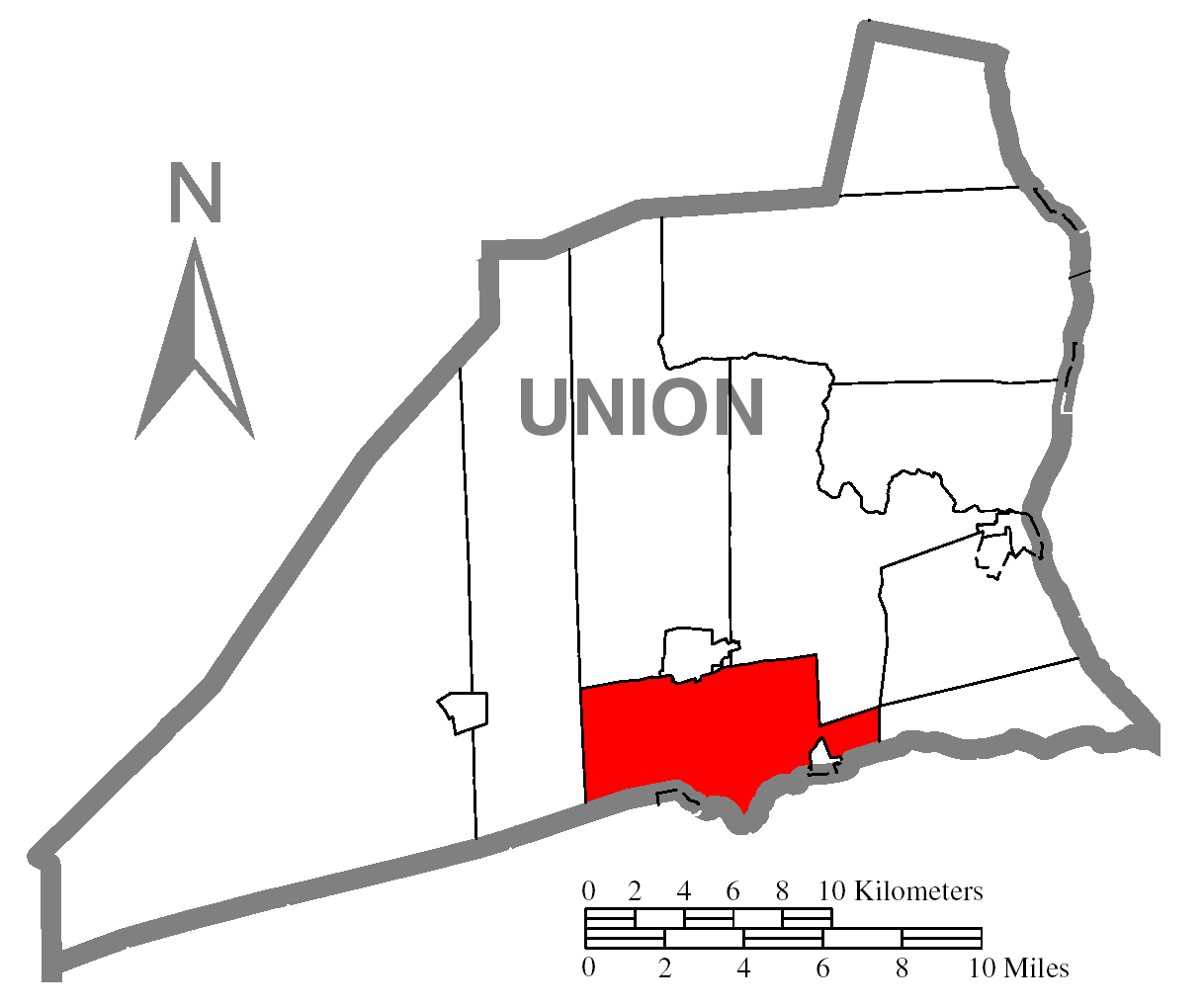
- Map of Union County, Pennsylvania highlighting Limestone Township

- Map of Pennsylvania highlighting Union County
- Country: United States
- State: Pennsylvania
- County: Union
- Settled: 1769
- Incorporated: 1850

Area
  - Total: 20.72 sq mi (53.66 km^{2})
  - Land: 20.54 sq mi (53.20 km^{2})
  - Water: 0.18 sq mi (0.47 km^{2})

Population (2020)
  - Total: 1,720 ▼
  - Estimate (2021): 1,716
  - Density: 85.3/sq mi (32.95/km^{2})
- Time zone: UTC-5 (EST)
  - Summer (DST): UTC-4 (EDT)
- FIPS code: 42-119-43368
- Website: https://limestonetownship.com/

Limestone Township is a township in Union County, Pennsylvania, United States. The population was 1,720 at the 2020 census.

== Geography ==
According to the United States Census Bureau, the township has a total area of 20.6 square miles (53.3 km^{2}), of which 20.5 square miles (53.2 km^{2}) is land and 0.04 square mile (0.1 km^{2}) (0.19%) is water.

Limestone Township is bordered by West Buffalo Township, Mifflinburg and Buffalo Township to the north, Union Township to the east, Snyder County to the south and Lewis Township to the west.

== Demographics ==
Historical population
| Census | Pop. | Note | %± |
|---|---|---|---|
| 2010 | 1,723 | | — |
| 2020 | 1,720 | | −0.2% |
| 2021 (est.) | 1,716 | | −0.2% |
U.S. Decennial Census

As of the census of 2000, there were 1,572 people, 526 households, and 444 families residing in the township. The population density was 76.5 inhabitants per square mile (29.5/km^{2}). There were 620 housing units at an average density of 30.2 per square mile (11.7/km^{2}). The racial makeup of the township was 98.79% White, 0.38% African American, 0.06% Native American, 0.06% Asian, and 0.70% from two or more races. Hispanic or Latino of any race were 0.19% of the population.

There were 526 households, out of which 39.0% had children under the age of 18 living with them, 77.8% were married couples living together, 3.8% had a female householder with no husband present, and 15.4% were non-families. 13.3% of all households were made up of individuals, and 6.7% had someone living alone who was 65 years of age or older. The average household size was 2.99 and the average family size was 3.27.

In the township the population was spread out, with 29.6% under the age of 18, 8.5% from 18 to 24, 26.3% from 25 to 44, 25.2% from 45 to 64, and 10.4% who were 65 years of age or older. The median age was 35 years. For every 100 females, there were 108.8 males. For every 100 females age 18 and over, there were 105.4 males.

The median income for a household in the township was $43,646, and the median income for a family was $47,240. Males had a median income of $31,855 versus $21,250 for females. The per capita income for the township was $18,117. About 3.3% of families and 5.4% of the population were below the poverty line, including 7.5% of those under age 18 and 5.7% of those age 65 or over.

== Government ==
The township's polling place is the Township Municipal Building, 3840 Wildwood Road, Mifflinburg 17844.
