= Milton Area School District =

School district in Pennsylvania

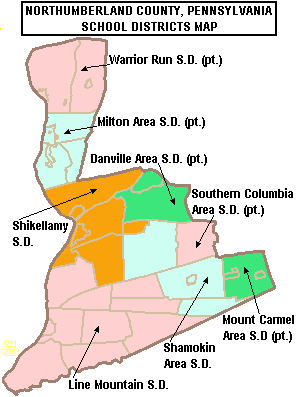

Address
- 700 Mahoning Street Milton, Union County, Northumberland County, Pennsylvania, 17847; United States

District information
- Type: Public
- Motto: Preparing students for 21st century success through Educational Excellence
- Grades: K-12

Students and staff
- District mascot: Panther

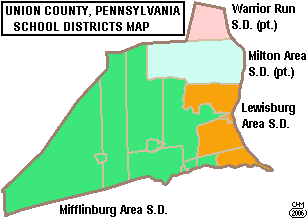
Map of Union County, Pennsylvania Public School Districts

The Milton Area School District is a small, rural public school district headquartered in Milton, Pennsylvania. The district is located in Northumberland and Union counties. Milton Area School District encompasses approximately 85 square miles (220 km^{2}). The district serves East Chillisquaque Township, Milton Borough, Turbot Township, and West Chillisquaque of Northumberland County. The district additionally serves White Deer Township of Union County. According to 2000 federal census data, it served a resident population of 15,510. By 2010, the Milton Area School District's population increased to 16,561 people. The educational attainment levels for the School District population (25 years old and over) were 85.5% high school graduates and 13% college graduates. The district is one of the 500 public school districts of Pennsylvania.

According to the Pennsylvania Budget and Policy Center, 51.4% of the district's pupils lived at 185% or below the Federal Poverty Level as shown by their eligibility for the federal free or reduced price school meal programs in 2012. In 2009, the Milton Area School District residents' per capita income was $17,781, while the median family income was $43,023 a year. In the Commonwealth, the median family income was $49,501 and the United States median family income was $49,445, in 2010. In Northumberland County, the median household income was $41,208. By 2013, the median household income in the United States rose to $52,100. In 2014, the median household income in the USA was $53,700.

== Extracurriculars ==
Milton Area School District offers a variety of clubs, activities and an extensive sports program.

=== Athletics ===
Milton High School participates in various sports through the Pennsylvania Interscholastic Athletic Association and is a member of the Pennsylvania Heartland Athletic Conference since 2008–2009 school year. The Pennsylvania Heartland Athletic Conference is a voluntary association of 25 PIAA High Schools within the central Pennsylvania region.

The district funds:

Boys

- Baseball - AAA
- Basketball- AAA
- Bowling - AAAA
- Cross Country - AA
- Football - AA
- Golf - AAA
- Soccer - AA
- Tennis - AA
- Track and Field - AAA
- Wrestling - AA

Girls

- Basketball - AAA
- Bowling - AAAA
- Cross Country - AA
- Field Hockey - AA
- Golf - AA
- Soccer (Fall) - AA
- Softball - AA
- Girls' Tennis - AA
- Track and Field - AA

Middle School Sports:

Boys: Basketball Cross Country Football Soccer Wrestling

Girls: Basketball Cross Country Field Hockey
