= Buffalo Township, Union County, Pennsylvania =

Township in Pennsylvania, US

Coordinates: 40°57′00″N 76°58′59″W

- Township
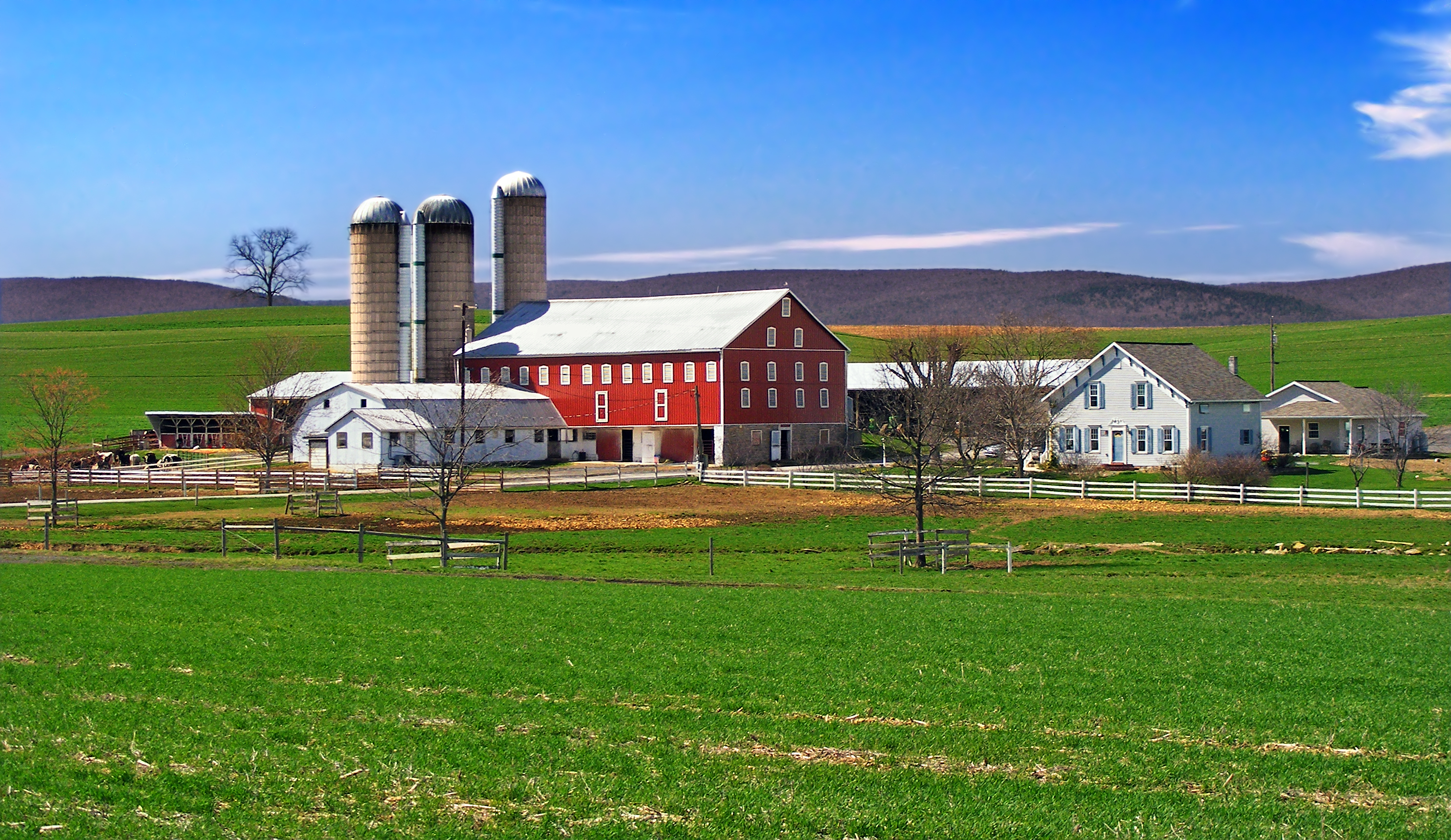
- There are many dairy farms like this in Buffalo Township

- Logo

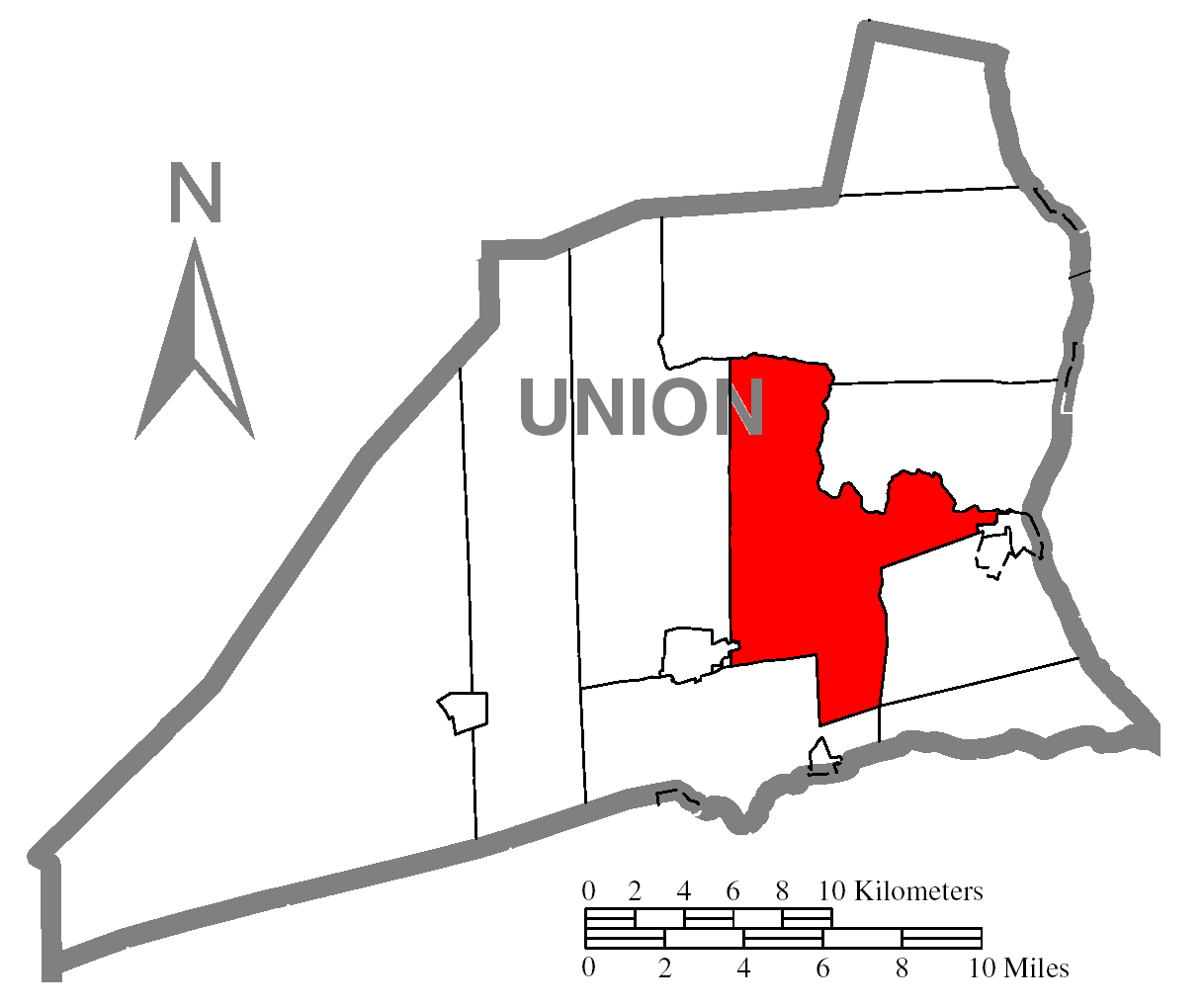
- Map of Union County, Pennsylvania highlighting Buffalo Township

- Map of Pennsylvania highlighting Union County
- Country: United States
- State: Pennsylvania
- County: Union
- Settled: 1770
- Incorporated: 1772

Area
  - Total: 30.33 sq mi (78.56 km^{2})
  - Land: 30.13 sq mi (78.04 km^{2})
  - Water: 0.20 sq mi (0.52 km^{2}) 0%

Population (2020)
  - Total: 3,536 ▼
  - Estimate (2021): 3,538
  - Density: 120.8/sq mi (46.63/km^{2})
- Time zone: UTC-5 (EST)
  - Summer (DST): UTC-4 (EDT)
- FIPS code: 42-119-10016
- Website: buffalo-twp.org

Buffalo Township is a township in Union County, Pennsylvania, United States. The population was 3,536 at the 2020 census.

== History ==
The Buffalo Presbyterian Church was added to the National Register of Historic Places in 1976.

== Geography ==
According to the United States Census Bureau, the township has a total area of 30.6 square miles (79 km^{2}), all land.

Buffalo Township is bordered by White Deer Township to the north, Kelly Township to the east and north, Lewisburg to the east, East Buffalo Township to the south and east, Limestone Township to the south and west, and West Buffalo Township to the west.

== Demographics ==
Historical population
Census	Pop.	Note	%±
2010	3,538		—
2020	3,536		−0.1%
2021 (est.)	3,538		0.1%
U.S. Decennial Census

As of the census of 2000, there were 3,207 people, 1,166 households, and 895 families residing in the township. The population density was 104.8 inhabitants per square mile (40.5/km^{2}). There were 1,215 housing units at an average density of 39.7 per square mile (15.3/km^{2}). The racial makeup of the township was 97.85% White, 0.56% African American, 0.09% Native American, 0.25% Asian, 0.03% Pacific Islander, 0.37% from other races, and 0.84% from two or more races. Hispanic or Latino of any race were 0.97% of the population.

There were 1,166 households, out of which 35.1% had children under the age of 18 living with them, 66.6% were married couples living together, 7.0% had a female householder with no husband present, and 23.2% were non-families. 21.0% of all households were made up of individuals, and 10.5% had someone living alone who was 65 years of age or older. The average household size was 2.73 and the average family size was 3.18.

In the township the population was spread out, with 29.2% under the age of 18, 7.1% from 18 to 24, 26.5% from 25 to 44, 22.4% from 45 to 64, and 14.8% who were 65 years of age or older. The median age was 36 years. For every 100 females, there were 103.7 males. For every 100 females age 18 and over, there were 94.8 males.

The median income for a household in the township was $37,539, and the median income for a family was $42,222. Males had a median income of $31,121 versus $21,315 for females. The per capita income for the township was $18,764. About 8.4% of families and 10.5% of the population were below the poverty line, including 16.1% of those under age 18 and 6.6% of those age 65 or over.

== Villages ==
- Buffalo Crossroads
- Cameron
- Cowan
- Mazeppa
- Vicksburg
