= West Buffalo Township, Union County, Pennsylvania =

Township in Pennsylvania, US

Coordinates: 41°02′00″N 77°04′59″W

West Buffalo Township, Pennsylvania
- Township
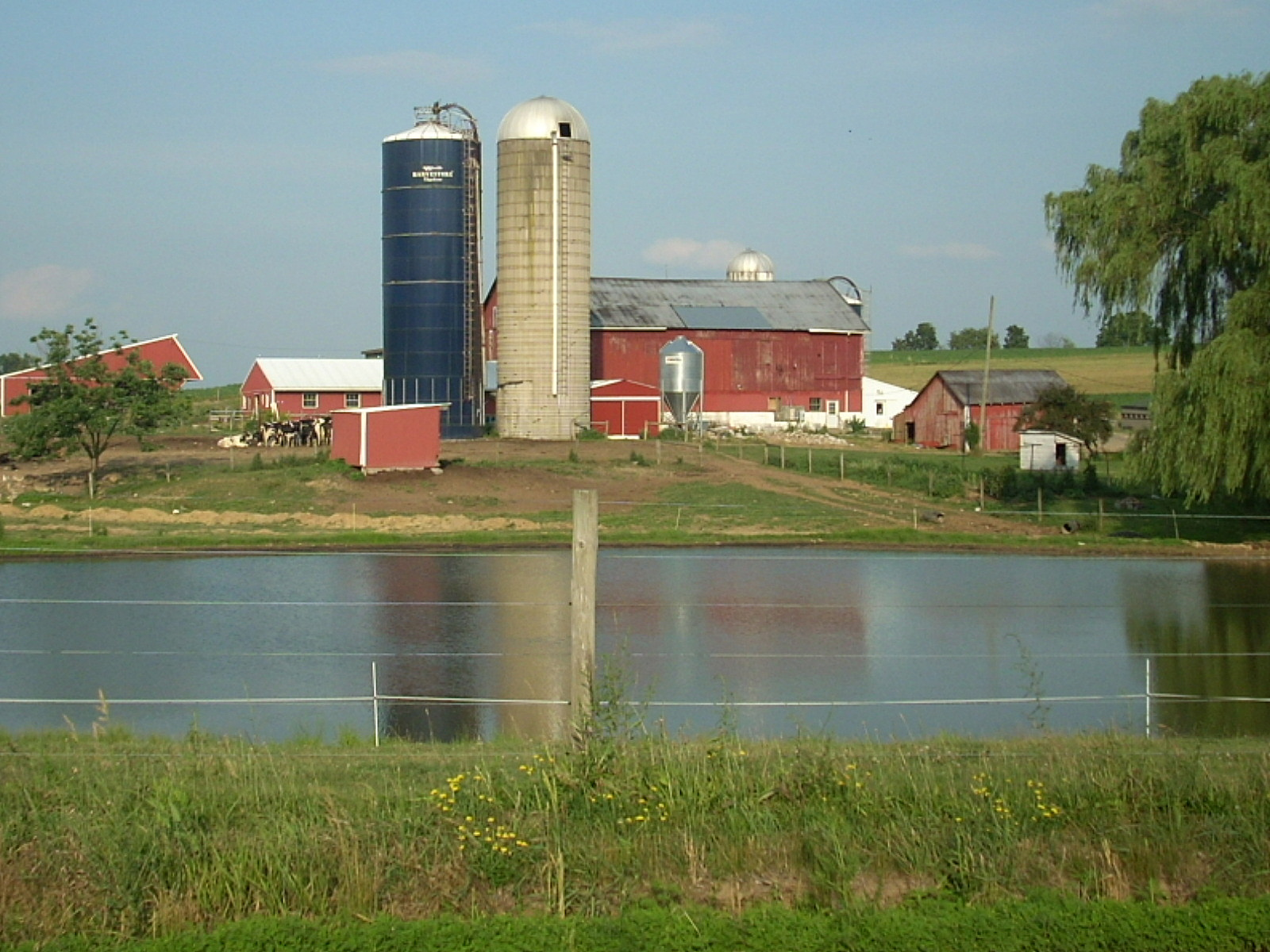
- There are many dairy farms like this in West Buffalo Township.

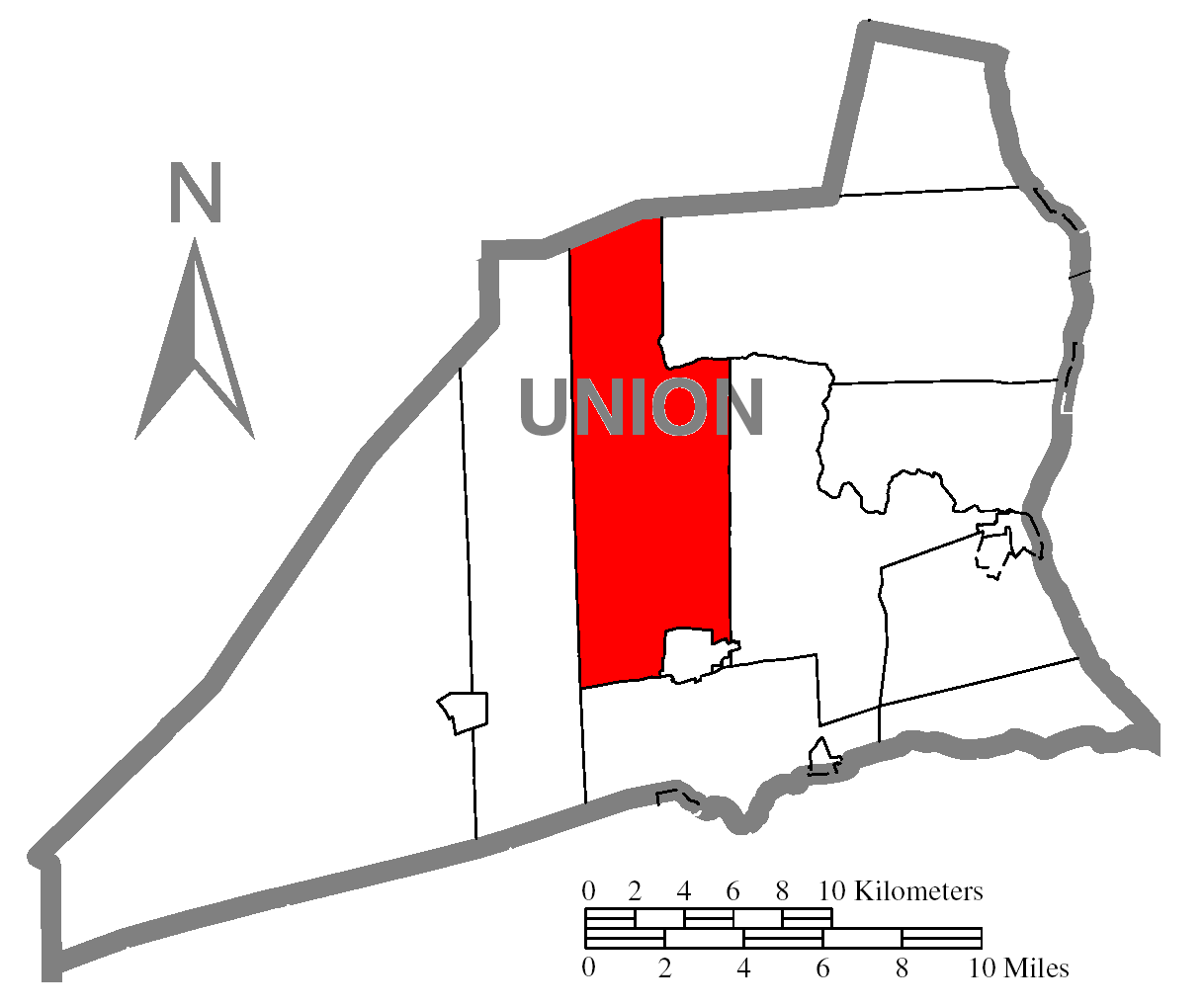
- Map of Union County, Pennsylvania highlighting West Buffalo Township

- Map of Pennsylvania highlighting Union County
- Country: United States
- State: Pennsylvania
- County: Union
- Settled: 1769
- Incorporated: 1792

Area
  - Total: 38.34 sq mi (99.31 km^{2})
  - Land: 38.26 sq mi (99.09 km^{2})
  - Water: 0.081 sq mi (0.21 km^{2})

Population (2020)
  - Total: 2,838 ▼
  - Estimate (2021): 2,820
  - Density: 79.1/sq mi (30.54/km^{2})
- Time zone: UTC-5 (EST)
  - Summer (DST): UTC-4 (EDT)
- FIPS code: 42-119-82640

West Buffalo Township is a township in Union County, Pennsylvania, United States. The population was 2,820 at the 2020 census.

== History ==
West Buffalo Township is a second class township in Union County, Pennsylvania. It was created from Buffalo Township, Northumberland County in August 1792. That same summer, Elias Youngman founded the town of Mifflinburg. Youngman also became the first supervisor of West Buffalo Township. Circa 1795, George Rote (Roth/Rhoads) founded the town of Greenville adjacent to Mifflinburg. The division line was Third Street. These towns were part of West Buffalo Township, Northumberland County from 1792 until 1813, when Union County was created on March 22, and Mifflinburg was established as the county seat. In 1827, the Borough of Mifflinburg was incorporated and ceased to be a part of West Buffalo Township.

The township is situated within the heart of the historic Buffalo Valley, created by the north and southwest branches of Buffalo Creek. The Hayes Bridge, spanning the southwest branch of Buffalo Creek and named for local landowner, Robert Hayes, was added to the National Register of Historic Places in 1980.

== Geography ==
According to the United States Census Bureau, the township has a total area of 38.0 square miles (98.4 km^{2}), of which 38.0 square miles (98.4 km^{2}) is land and 0.03% is water.

West Buffalo Township is bordered by Lycoming County to the north, White Deer and Buffalo Townships to the east, Mifflinburg and Limestone Township to the south and Lewis Township to the west.

== Demographics ==
Historical population
Census	Pop.	Note	%±
2010	2,983		—
2020	2,838		−4.9%
2021 (est.)	2,820		−0.6%
U.S. Decennial Census

As of the census of 2000, there were 2,795 people, 993 households, and 753 families residing in the township. The population density was 73.6 inhabitants per square mile (28.4/km^{2}). There were 1,149 housing units at an average density of 30.2 per square mile (11.7/km^{2}). The racial makeup of the township was 98.10% White, 0.43% African American, 0.25% Native American, 0.32% Asian, 0.25% from other races, and 0.64% from two or more races. Hispanic or Latino of any race were 0.97% of the population.

There were 993 households, out of which 39.5% had children under the age of 18 living with them, 64.0% were married couples living together, 6.8% had a female householder with no husband present, and 24.1% were non-families. 20.2% of all households were made up of individuals, and 9.0% had someone living alone who was 65 years of age or older. The average household size was 2.81 and the average family size was 3.24.

In the township the population was spread out, with 30.6% under the age of 18, 8.5% from 18 to 24, 30.3% from 25 to 44, 20.7% from 45 to 64, and 9.9% who were 65 years of age or older. The median age was 34 years. For every 100 females, there were 101.7 males. For every 100 females age 18 and over, there were 99.9 males.

The median income for a household in the township was $40,000, and the median income for a family was $43,654. Males had a median income of $30,464 versus $21,307 for females. The per capita income for the township was $17,173. About 6.0% of families and 6.8% of the population were below the poverty line, including 5.3% of those under age 18 and 16.6% of those age 65 or over.
