= Turtle Creek (West Branch Susquehanna River tributary) =

Tributary of the West Branch Susquehanna River in Pennsylvania

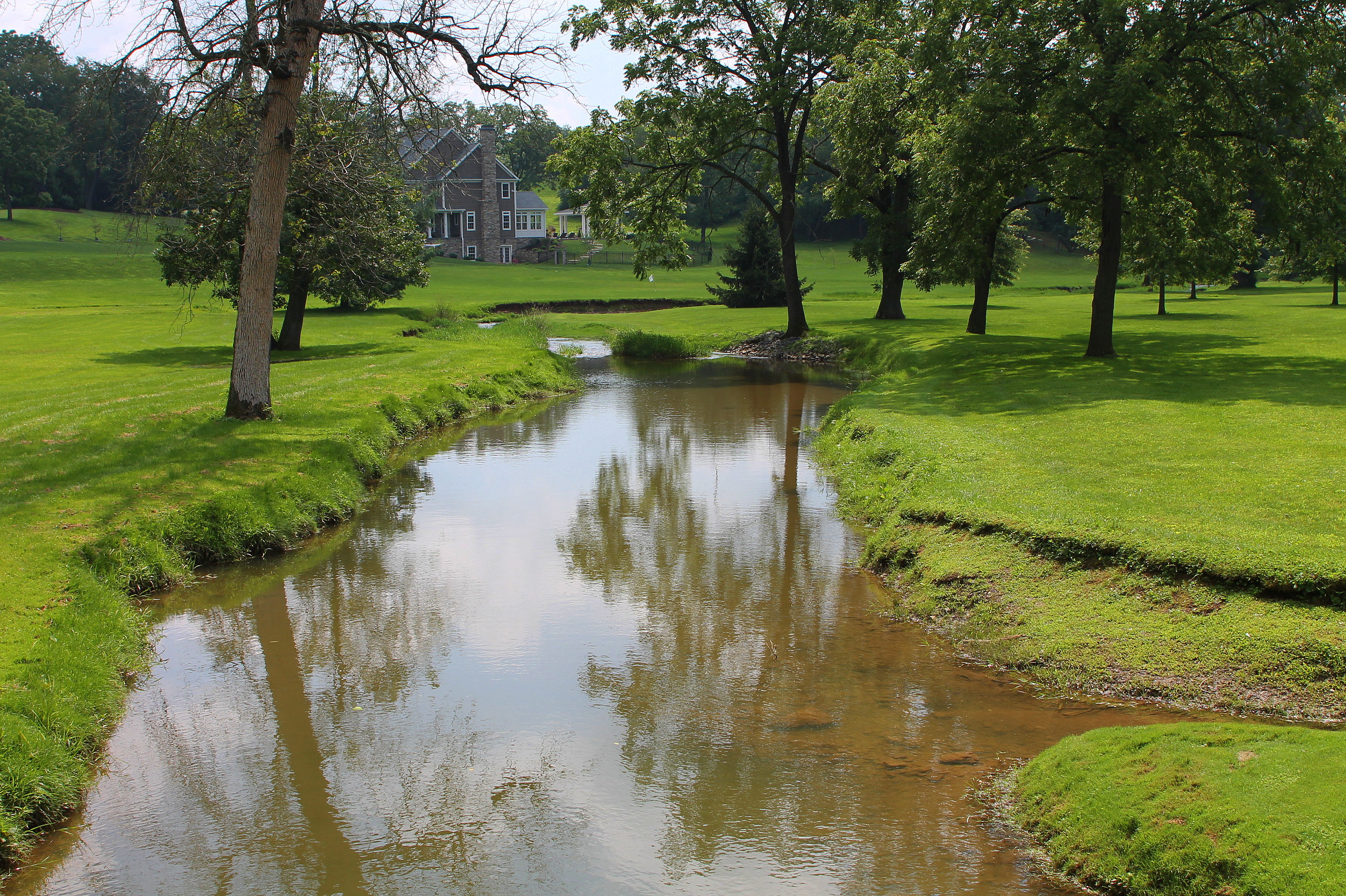
- Turtle Creek looking downstream

Physical characteristics
- Source
  - location: shallow valley in Limestone Township, Union County, Pennsylvania
  - elevation: between 620 and 640 feet (190 and 200 m)
- Mouth
  - location: West Branch Susquehanna River in East Buffalo Township, Union County, Pennsylvania
  - coordinates: 40°55′34″N 76°51′38″W
  - elevation: 430 ft (130 m)
- Length: 8.4 mi (13.5 km)
- Basin size: 12.7 sq mi (33 km^{2})

Basin features
- Progression: West Branch Susquehanna River → Susquehanna River → Chesapeake Bay
- Tributaries
  - left: two unnamed tributaries
  - right: six unnamed tributaries

Turtle Creek is a tributary of the West Branch Susquehanna River in Union County, Pennsylvania, in the United States. It is 8.4 miles (13.5 km) long and flows through Limestone Township, Buffalo Township, and East Buffalo Township. The watershed of the creek has an area of 12.7 square miles (33 km^{2}). The creek is designated as an impaired waterbody, with the cause of the impairment being siltation and the source being agriculture. It has a daily sediment load of 6,372 pounds (2,890 kg). The main surficial rock types in the creek's watershed include shale, carbonate, and sandstone. The creek is in the ridge and valley physiographic province.

The main land uses in the watershed of Turtle Creek are forested land and agriculture. However, low-intensity development, wetlands, and grass/turf also occur within the watershed. The area in the creek's vicinity was settled as early as the late 1760s and various mills were built along it in the late 18th century. A number of bridges have been constructed across it. The drainage basin of the creek is designated as a Warmwater Fishery and a Migratory Fishery. Its riparian buffer is absent in some reaches.

== Course ==
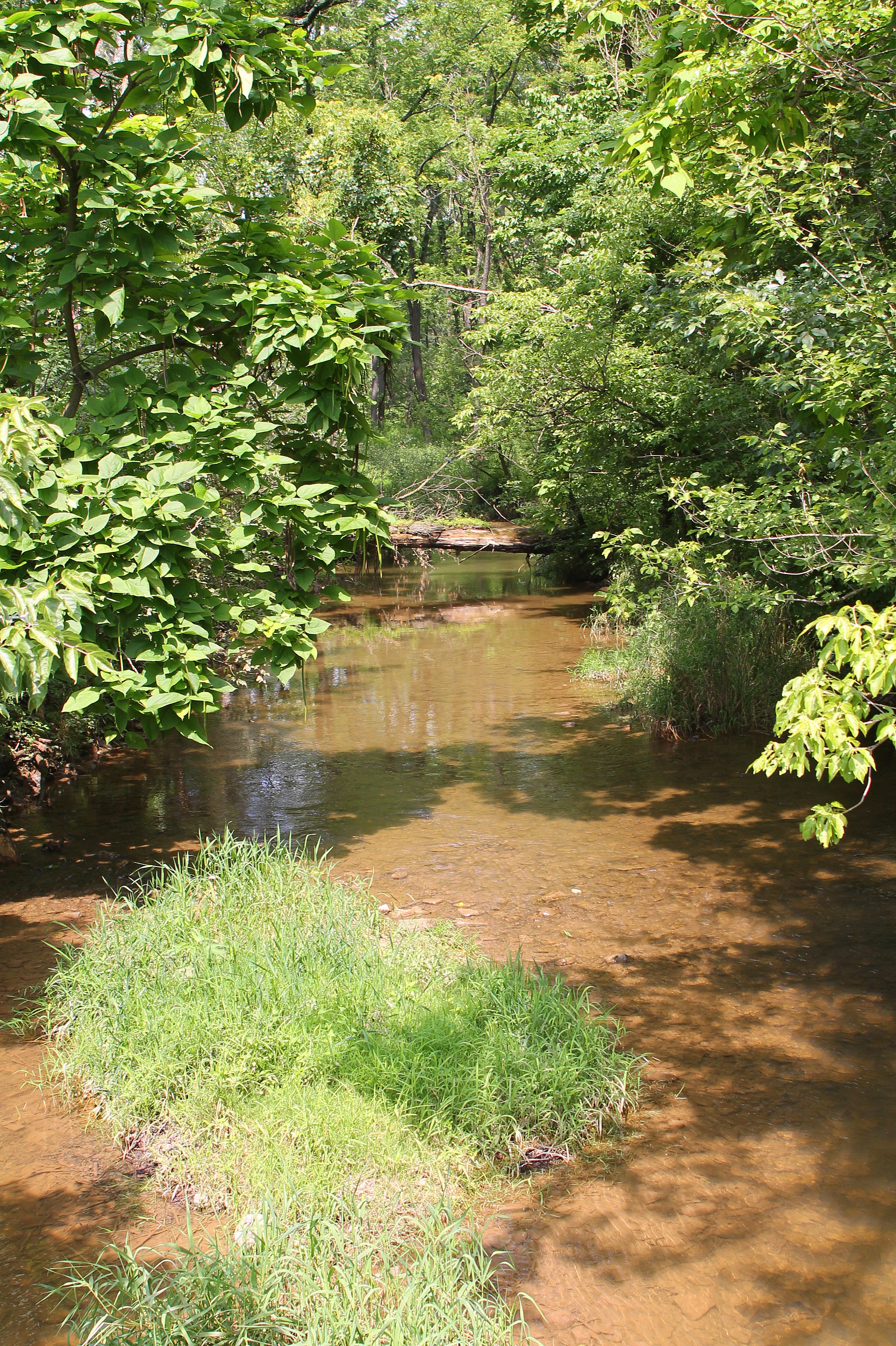
Turtle Creek looking upstream

Turtle Creek begins in a shallow valley in Limestone Township. It flows east for several tenths of a mile, almost immediately entering Buffalo Township. The creek then turns north for several tenths of a mile and enters a much broader valley and receiving an unnamed tributary from the left. At this point, it turns east-northeast for several miles, entering East Buffalo Township and receiving three unnamed tributaries from the right. The creek then turns east-southeast and its valley becomes narrower. Over the next few miles, it receives one unnamed tributary from the left and three more from the right. It eventually crosses US Route 15 and turns northeast. A short distance further downstream, it reaches its confluence with the West Branch Susquehanna River.

Turtle Creek joins the West Branch Susquehanna River 4.60 miles (7.40 km) upriver of its mouth.

== Hydrology and climate ==
Various stream reaches in the watershed of Turtle Creek are designated as impaired. The cause of the impairment is siltation and the source of the impairment is agriculture. A total of 8.8 miles (14.2 km) of streams in the watershed are impaired. Most of these are in the middle reaches of the watershed.

The daily load of sediment in Turtle Creek is 6,372 pounds (2,890 kg). This equates to an annual sediment load of 2,325,800 pounds (1,055,000 kg). The total maximum daily load for the creek requires a 37.2 percent reduction in the sediment load. A total of 1,270,200 pounds (576,200 kg) of sediment per year comes from croplands and another 833,200 pounds (377,900 kg) per year comes from streambanks. A total of 80,800 pounds (36,700 kg) per year comes from forested land, 77,400 pounds (35,100 kg) comes from hay and pastures, 35,000 pounds (16,000 kg) comes from transitional land, and 29,200 pounds (13,200 kg) comes from low-intensity development. No sediment comes from

The average annual rate of rainfall in the watershed of Turtle Creek over a 23-year period was found to be 42.1 inches (107 cm). The average annual rate of runoff was 3.4 inches (8.6 cm). The runoff curve number in the watershed of Turtle Creek is 87 for transitional lands and wetlands, 83 for low-intensity development, 82 for croplands, 75 for hay and pastures, 73 for forests, and 71 for grassy land.

== Geography and geology ==
The elevation near the mouth of Turtle Creek is 430 feet (130 m) above sea level. The elevation of the creek's source is between 620 and 640 feet (190 and 200 m) above sea level. The elevations in the watershed range from approximately 450 to 1,100 feet (140 to 340 m) above sea level.

The watershed of Turtle Creek is in the ridge and valley physiographic province. The creek's valley is in the lowlands of Union County. Erosion occurs along certain streambanks in the creek's watershed.

A total of 55 percent of the surface geology in the watershed of Turtle Creek is shale. A total of 30 percent is carbonate and the remaining 15 percent is sandstone. The most prevalent hydrologic soil groups are C (80 percent) and B (20 percent). The K factor, a measure of the erodability of soil, is 0.249 in the forested land of the creek's watershed, 0.272 in the watershed's wetlands, 0.275 in hay or pastures and land classified by the Pennsylvania Department of Environmental Protection as "low-intensity development", 0.277 in transitional land, 0.28 in grassy areas, and 0.292 in agricultural lands.

Groundwater from a ridge known as Shamokin Mountain contributes to Turtle Creek.

Iron ore was observed on the creek by the 1800s. This ore was pinkish and has been described as "compact, coarse, siliceous". It resembled ores from near Danville. A soil known as the Crestmore silt loam occurs in small areas near the creek.

== Watershed ==
The watershed of Turtle Creek has an area of 12.7 square miles (33 km^{2}). The mouth of the creek is in the United States Geological Survey quadrangle of Northumberland. However, its source is in the quadrangle of Lewisburg. There are 24.0 miles (38.6 km) of streams in the watershed

Agriculture is the most common land use in the watershed of Turtle Creek, making up 47.1 percent of its area. Forested land is a close second, making up 45.6 percent of the watershed's area. Less common land uses include low-intensity development (6.9 percent), wetlands (0.3 percent), and turf/grass (0.1 percent).

The watershed of Turtle Creek is longer along the east-west axis than the north-south axis. It is entirely within Union County, though it occupies a fairly small portion of the county. Adjacent major watersheds include those of Buffalo Creek, Penns Creek, Limestone Run, and the West Branch Susquehanna River.

== History ==
Turtle Creek was entered into the Geographic Names Information System on August 2, 1979. Its identifier in the Geographic Names Information System is 1189973. The creek received its name some time before 1769.

Samuel Maclay carried out a survey in the vicinity of Turtle Creek in early March 1769. Several more surveys were done near the creek in that year. John Wilson had settled near the mouth of the creek by the fall of that year. In 1770, William Speddy settled approximately 1 mile (1.6 km) of its mouth. Some kind of mill on the creek was owned by a member of the Wilson family as early as 1771. In 1772, John Aurand settled at the mouth of the creek and constructed a gristmill and a sawmill there in the same year. The mill eventually came to be known as Jenkins Mill.

Christopher Weiser's fulling mill was constructed on Turtle Creek in 1792. It later came to be owned by Peter Wolfe. In 1795, Anna M. Smith left 30 pounds in her will to the construction of a school for poor children at the mouth of the creek. In 1842, iron ore was discovered downstream of its mouth. In 1853, several people from Lewisburg purchased 20 acres (8.1 ha) of land to the south of the mouth of Turtle Creek and set up the Union Furnace. Thomas Follmer, Henry Follmer, and William Gundy drowned at the mouth of the creek in 1846.

A concrete tee beam bridge carrying US Route 15 was constructed over Turtle Creek in 1930 and repaired in 1962. It is 49.9 feet (15.2 m) long and is situated 1.5 miles (2.4 km) north of Winfield. A prestressed box beam or girders bridge carrying T-432/Stein Lane over the creek was built in 1932 and repaired in 1984. It is 1.7 miles (2.7 km) south of Linntown and is 35.1 feet (10.7 m) long. A bridge of a similar type was constructed over the creek for US Route 15 in 1962 and repaired in 2005. This bridge is 62.0 feet (18.9 m) long and is situated 1.5 miles (2.4 km) north of Winfield. In 1983, a concrete culvert bridge was constructed over the creek 4 miles (6.4 km) east of Mifflinburg. It is 29.9 feet (9.1 m) long and carries State Route 2004. A prestressed box beam or girders bridge known as County Bridge #10 was built across the creek 2 miles (3.2 km) south-southeast of Linntown in 1989. with a length of 38.1 feet (11.6 m). A bridge of the same type was constructed over the creek 2 miles (3.2 km) southwest of Linntown in 2000, with a length of 60.0 feet (18.3 m).

Turtle Creek was described as a "[stream] of major concern" in the Union County Open Space and Recreation Plan in 1973. In late 20th century, the Union County: A Plan for Development recommended the creation of a greenway along the floodplain of Turtle Creek, running westward from the West Branch Susquehanna River.

== Biology ==
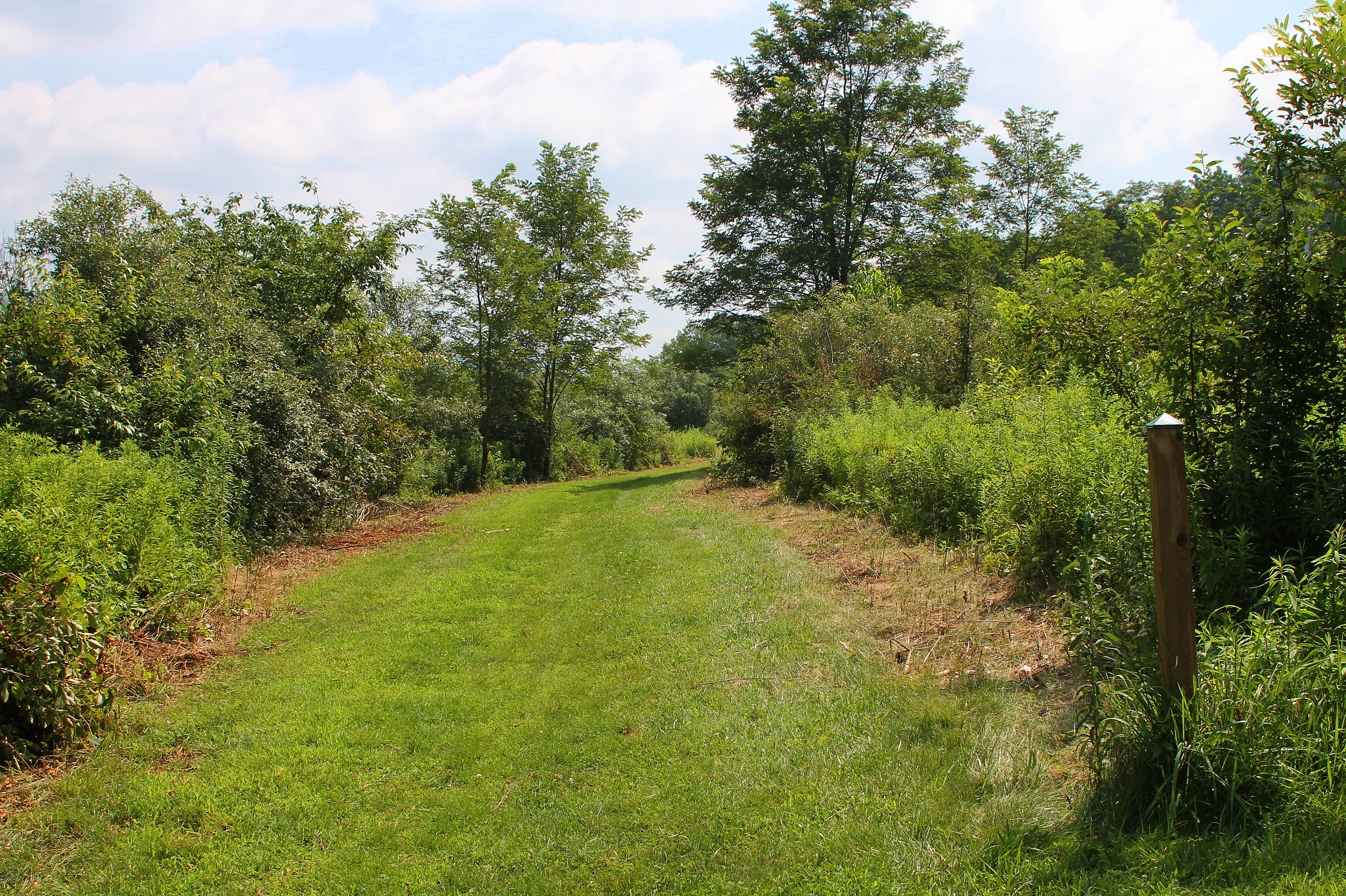
Path in Turtle Creek Park

The drainage basin of Turtle Creek is designated as a Warmwater Fishery and a Migratory Fishery. In the 1930s, the creek was noted in the Pennsylvania Angler to be a viable spot for sucker fishing.

The riparian buffers of Turtle Creek are diminished or completely absent in the areas where the creek flows through agricultural land. Cattle are also allowed access to the creek in some places.

A park known as the Turtle Creek Park is located in the vicinity of Turtle Creek. It is a popular destination for local walkers. Numerous successional habitats occur within the park.

== See also ==
- Winfield Creek, next tributary of the West Branch Susquehanna River going downriver
- Chillisquaque Creek, next tributary of the West Branch Susquehanna River going upriver
- List of rivers of Pennsylvania
