= Pennsylvania Route 204 =

State highway in Pennsylvania, US

Pennsylvania Route 204

Route information
- Maintained by PennDOT
- Length: 9.690 mi (15.595 km)
- Existed: 1928–present

Major junctions
- South end: US 522 in Selinsgrove
- North end: PA 304 in New Berlin

Location
- Country: United States
- State: Pennsylvania
- Counties: Snyder, Union

Highway system
- Pennsylvania State Route System; Interstate; US; State; Scenic; Legislative
← PA 203	→ US 206

Pennsylvania Route 204 (PA 204), also known as Vine Street in the town of New Berlin, is a 9.7-mile-long (15.6 km), north–south state highway located in Snyder and Union counties in Pennsylvania. The southern terminus is at U.S. Route 522 (US 522) in Selinsgrove. The northern terminus is at PA 304 in New Berlin.

== Route description ==
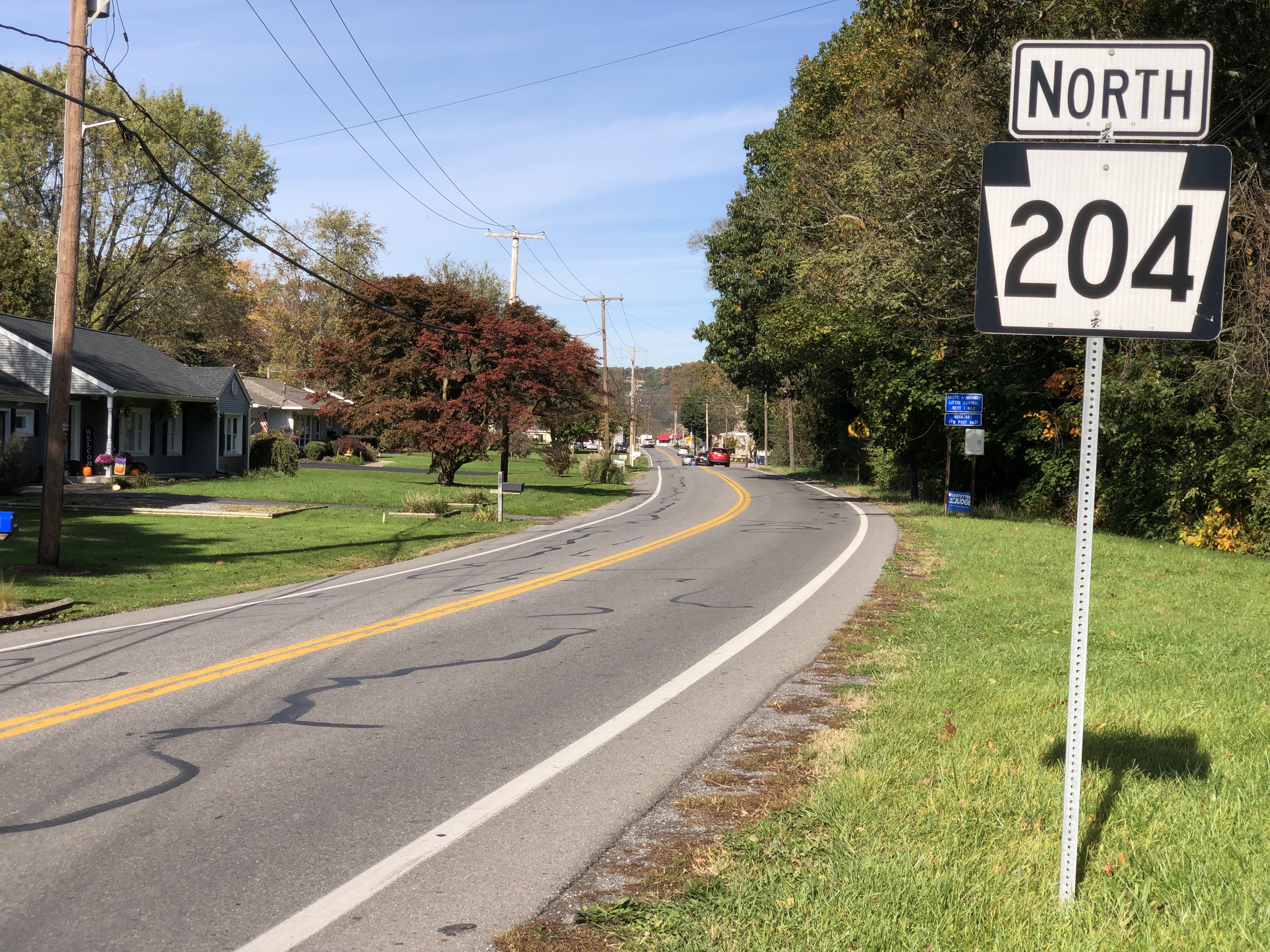
PA 204 northbound leaving Selinsgrove

PA 204 begins in the borough of Selinsgrove at the intersection of US 522, under a half a mile from the Penn Valley Airport. The route goes north for about 4 miles (6.4 km) before turning west in the village of Kratzerville, towards the Snyder-Union county line.

At the county line, PA 204 turns north into the borough of New Berlin, before terminating a short distance into the town at an intersection of PA 304.

== History ==
PA 204 has stayed on the same roads since its inception.

== Major intersections ==
County	Location	mi	km	Destinations	Notes
Snyder	Selinsgrove	0.000	0.000	US 522 / Broad Street – Selinsgrove, Middleburg	Southern terminus
Union	New Berlin	9.690	15.595	PA 304 (Market Street) / Vine Street – Mifflinburg, Winfield	Northern terminus
1.000 mi = 1.609 km; 1.000 km = 0.621 mi
