= Pennsylvania Route 304 =

State highway in Pennsylvania, US

Pennsylvania Route 304

Route information
- Maintained by PennDOT
- Length: 12.842 mi (20.667 km)

Major junctions
- West end: PA 45 in Mifflinburg
- PA 204 in New Berlin
- East end: US 15 in Winfield

Location
- Country: United States
- State: Pennsylvania
- Counties: Union

Highway system
- Pennsylvania State Route System; Interstate; US; State; Scenic; Legislative
← PA 303	→ PA 305

Pennsylvania Route 304 (PA 304) is a 12.8-mile-long (20.6 km) state highway that is located in Union County, Pennsylvania, United States.

The western terminus is situated at PA 45 in Mifflinburg. The eastern terminus is located at US 15 in Winfield.

== Route description ==
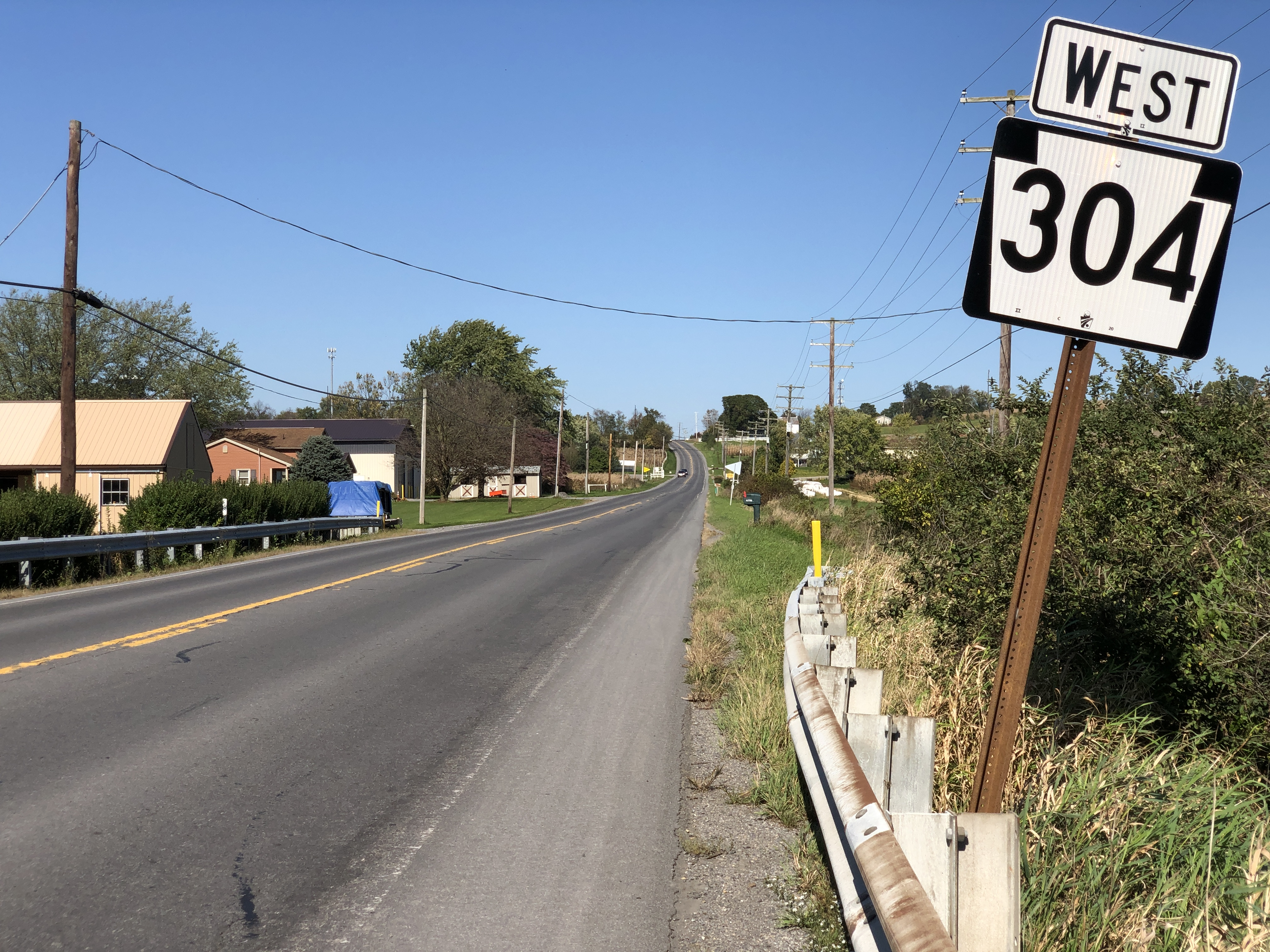
PA 304 westbound in Limestone Township

PA 304 begins at an intersection with PA 45 in the borough of Mifflinburg in Union County, heading southeast on two-lane undivided South 4th Street. The road heads through residential areas before crossing into Limestone Township. In this area, the route heads south into open agricultural areas with a few homes, becoming an unnamed road.

PA 304 curves southeast and reaches the residential community of Dice, continuing through a mix of farmland and woodland with a few residences. The road turns northeast through more open agricultural lands until it crosses into the borough of New Berlin.

At this point, the name of the route passes several homes, coming to an intersection with the northern terminus of PA 204. After passing through more of the town, PA 304 heads back into agricultural areas with some residences and becomes County Line Road as it runs to the north of Penns Creek.

The route then becomes the border between Union Township, Union County to the north and Jackson Township, Snyder County to the south, with the creek turning south away from the road. PA 304 splits from County Line Road and fully enters Union Township as it passes through more rural areas on an unnamed road, running through Dry Valley Cross Roads.

The road continues northeast through more farmland with occasional residences before coming to the community of Winfield. Here, PA 304 turns north and passes homes prior to ending at US 15.

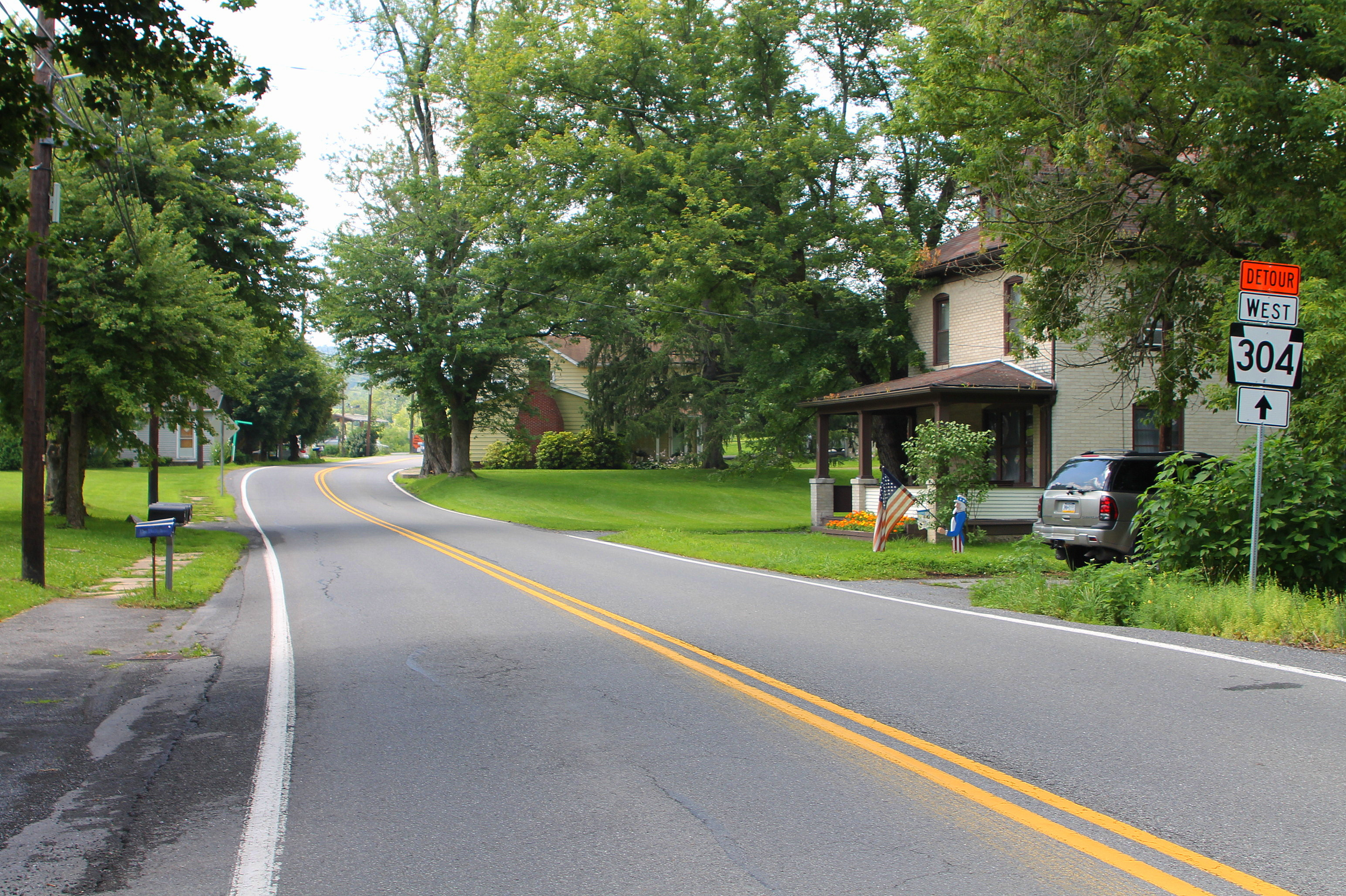
PA 304 west in Winfield

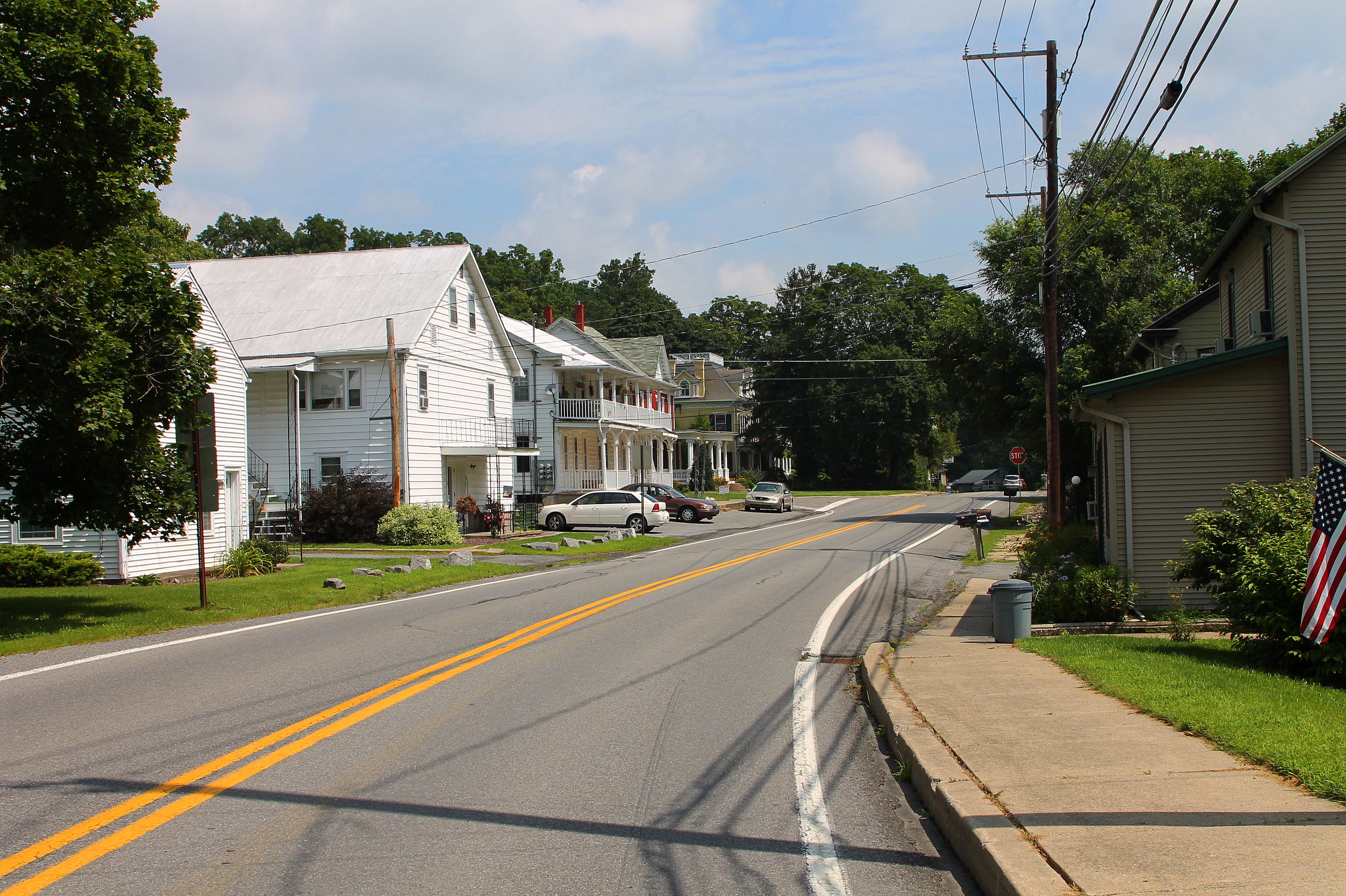
PA 304 east in Winfield

== Major intersections ==
The entire route is in Union County.

Location	mi	km	Destinations	Notes
Mifflinburg	0.000	0.000	PA 45 (Chestnut Street)	Western terminus
New Berlin	5.336	8.587	PA 204 south (Vine Street) – Selinsgrove	Northern terminus of PA 204
Union Township	12.842	20.667	US 15 – Lewisburg, Selinsgrove	Eastern terminus
1.000 mi = 1.609 km; 1.000 km = 0.621 mi

== PA 304 Truck ==
Pennsylvania Route 304 Truck
- Location: Mifflinburg, Pennsylvania
- Existed: 1980–present

Pennsylvania Route 304 Truck (PA 304 Truck) is a 2.2-mile-long (3.5 km) truck route in and around Mifflinburg. Narrow streets within the borough are avoided by this designation, and a complicated intersection with Pennsylvania Route 45, which does not contain turning lanes, is bypassed.

The route is concurrent with other highways for its entire length. It is cosigned with PA 104 for the first 1.7 miles (2.7 km) of the route, and is designated SR 3004 (Red Ridge Road) for the remainder.

It is signed in the eastbound direction only, with the opposite direction signed as PA 45 Truck.
