= Lewisburg Area High School =

Coordinates: 40°58′55″N 76°53′49″W

Location
- 545 Newman Road; Lewisburg, Union County, Pennsylvania 17837-1455; United States

Information
- School type: Public
- School district: Lewisburg Area School District
- Principal: Joshua Popowycz
- Faculty: 44 teachers (2017), 42 teachers (2013), 39 teachers 2012
- Enrollment: 626 (2016-17)
- Mascot: Green Dragon
- Website: https://lahs.lasd.us/

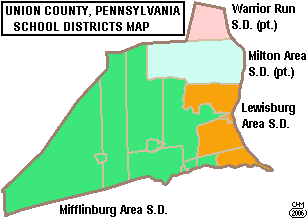
School District region in Union County

Lewisburg Area High School is a small rural/suburban public school located in Lewisburg, Union County, Pennsylvania. It is the sole high school operated by the Lewisburg Area School District. Lewisburg Area High School serves: Lewisburg Borough, Kelly Township, East Buffalo Township and Union Township that collectively have a population of 18,190 people according to the 2020 US Census.

In addition to the traditional bricks-and-mortar format, the school offers a cyber school called Blended Academy, alternative education and technology and job skills training at SUN Area Technical Institute.

== History ==
The school was originally the Lewisburg High School.

== Student activities ==
A wide variety of clubs, activities and an extensive athletics program are offered to Lewisburg Area School District students. The district is a member of the Pennsylvania Heartland Athletic Conference. Music programs include band, choir, and orchestra with several ensemble groups. A fall play and spring musical are staged each year.

=== Sports ===
LASD is a founding member of the Pennsylvania Heartland Athletic Conference for all athletics and participates under the rules and guidelines of the Pennsylvania Interscholastic Athletic Association. The district funds:

Boys

- Baseball - AA
- Basketball- AA
- Bowling - AAAA
- Cross country - AA
- Football - AA
- Golf - AA
- Lacrosse - AAAA
- Soccer - AA
- Swimming and diving - AA
- Tennis - AA
- Track and field - AA
- Wrestling - AA

Girls

- Basketball - AA
- Bowling - AAAA
- Cross country - AA
- Field hockey - AA
- Golf - AA
- Lacrosse - AAAA
- Soccer - AA
- Softball - AA
- Swimming and diving - AA
- Tennis - AA
- Track and field - AA

According to PIAA directory July 2012
