= Linntown, Pennsylvania =

Unincorporated community in Pennsylvania, US

Linntown
- Census-designated place
- Location within Pennsylvania
- Coordinates: 40°57′26″N 76°53′54″W
- Country: United States
- State: Pennsylvania
- County: Union
- Township: East Buffalo

Area
  - Total: 0.73 sq mi (1.89 km^{2})
  - Land: 0.73 sq mi (1.89 km^{2})
  - Water: 0 sq mi (0.00 km^{2})

Population (2020)
  - Total: 1,695
  - Density: 2,327.9/sq mi (898.82/km^{2})
- Time zone: UTC-5 (EST)
  - Summer (DST): UTC-4 (EDT)
- ZIP code: 17837
- Area codes: 272 and 570
- FIPS code: 42-43704

Linntown is a census-designated place (CDP) in East Buffalo Township, Union County, Pennsylvania, United States. The population was 1,695 at the 2020 census.

== History ==
The village of Linnville or Linntown came to be in the second half of the nineteenth century. Named for the Linn family who owned several farms on the south side of the Lewisburg-Mifflinburg turnpike (present-day Route 45), it originally consisted of just a few houses on the north side of the turnpike. Arrival of the railroad stimulated commercial ventures such as the Kulp Lumber Mill and the Lewisburg Chair Factory (1887, forerunner of Pennsylvania House). Linntown saw large population growth when the Linn farms were developed into residential building lots in the 1920s.

== Geography ==
Linntown is located at 40°57′26″N 76°53′54″W (40.957278, -76.898391), one mile (1.6 km) southwest of Lewisburg.

According to the United States Census Bureau, the CDP has a total area of 0.7 square miles (1.8 km^{2}), all land.

== Demographics ==
Historical population
Census	Pop.	Note	%±
2020	1,695		—
U.S. Decennial Census

As of the census of 2000, there were 1,542 people, 671 households, and 465 families residing in the CDP. The population density was 2,168.6 inhabitants per square mile (837.3/km^{2}). There were 700 housing units at an average density of 984.4 per square mile (380.1/km^{2}). The racial makeup of the CDP was 95.65% White, 1.30% African American, 0.06% Native American, 1.88% Asian, 0.13% Pacific Islander, 0.39% from other races, and 0.58% from two or more races. Hispanic or Latino of any race were 2.01% of the population.

There were 671 households, out of which 26.4% had children under the age of 18 living with them, 60.4% were married couples living together, 7.6% had a female householder with no husband present, and 30.6% were non-families. 27.9% of all households were made up of individuals, and 12.4% had someone living alone who was 65 years of age or older. The average household size was 2.29 and the average family size was 2.79.

In the CDP, the population was spread out, with 21.6% under the age of 18, 3.6% from 18 to 24, 23.6% from 25 to 44, 28.1% from 45 to 64, and 23.1% who were 65 years of age or older. The median age was 46 years. For every 100 females, there were 92.3 males. For every 100 females aged 18 and over, there were 87.2 males.

The median income for a household in the CDP was $50,000, and the median income for a family was $64,034. Males had a median income of $43,107 versus $27,000 for females. The per capita income for the CDP was $26,149. About 2.6% of families and 4.1% of the population were below the poverty line, including none of those under age 18 and 2.1% of those age 65 or over.

== Education ==
It is in the Lewisburg Area School District.
