= Lewisburg Armory =

- U.S. National Register of Historic Places
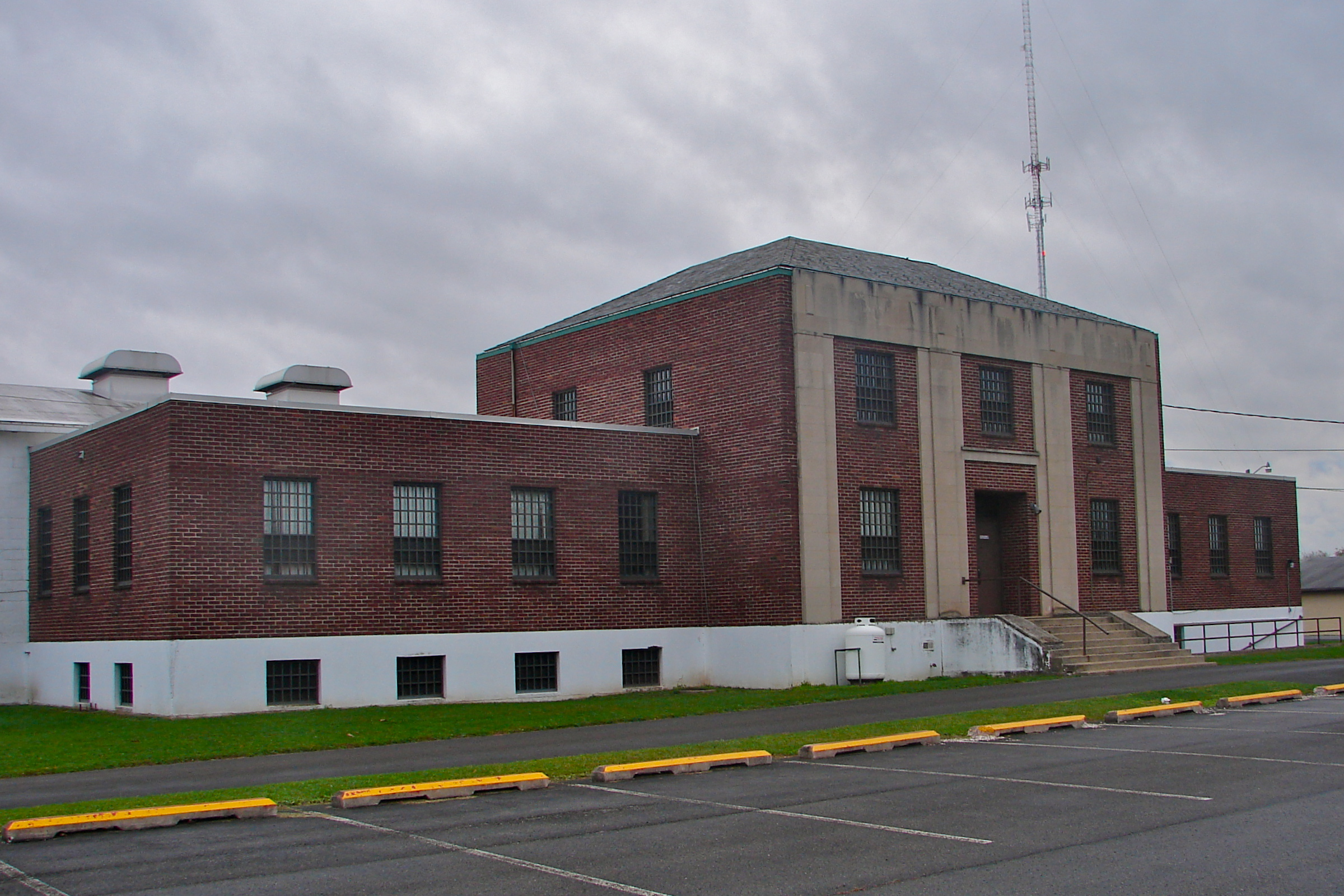
- Lewisburg Armory, October 2011

- Location within Pennsylvania Location within the United States
- Location: U.S. Route 15 south of its junction with Pennsylvania Route 45, East Buffalo Township, Pennsylvania
- Coordinates: 40°56′47″N 76°52′49″W
- Area: 13 acres (5.3 ha)
- Built: 1938
- Architectural style: Moderne
- MPS: Pennsylvania National Guard Armories MPS
- NRHP reference No.: 91001700
- Added to NRHP: November 14, 1991

The Lewisburg Armory is a historic National Guard armory in East Buffalo Township, Union County, Pennsylvania near Lewisburg.

It was added to the National Register of Historic Places in 1991.

== History and architectural features ==
Built in 1938, this historic structure is an "I-plan" building consisting of a two-story administration section with one-story wings, a one-and-one-half-story drill hall, and a two-story stable. The building was built with brick and concrete block, and was designed in the Moderne style. The administration section has a hipped roof; the drill hall has an arched roof and stable a flat roof.

It was added to the National Register of Historic Places in 1991.
