= Carl Bennett (statistician) =

American statistician

- Born: Carl Allen Bennett; November 22, 1922; Winfield, Pennsylvania, U.S.
- Died: June 2, 2014 (aged 91); Bellevue, Washington, U.S.
- Education: Bucknell University; University of Michigan
- Occupation: Statistician
- Spouse: Myra Schwan (m. 1945; died. 2005)

Carl Allen Bennett (November 22, 1922 – June 2, 2014) was an American statistician.

== Early life and career ==
Bennett was born in Winfield, Pennsylvania, the son of Charles and Edna Bennett. At the age of fourteen, he graduated from high school. After graduating, he attended Bucknell University, earning his master's degree in mathematics in 1941. During World War II, he worked on the Manhattan Project in Michigan and Oak Ridge, Tennessee. After the war, he served as a research assistant at Princeton University from 1950 to 1951. He attended the University of Michigan, earning his PhD degree in 1952.

Bennett served as manager and chief statistician in the department of mathematics at Hanford Atomic Products Operation. From 1971 to 1990, he then served as senior staff scientist at Battelle's Human Affairs Research Centers in Seattle, Washington. During his time at Batelle, in 1975, he was named a fellow of the American Association for the Advancement of Science.

== Personal life and death ==
In 1945, Bennett married Myra Schwan. Their marriage lasted until her death in 2005.

Bennett died at the Overlake Hospital Medical Center in Bellevue, Washington, on June 2, 2014, at the age of 91.
