= Old Union County Courthouse (Pennsylvania) =

- U.S. National Register of Historic Places
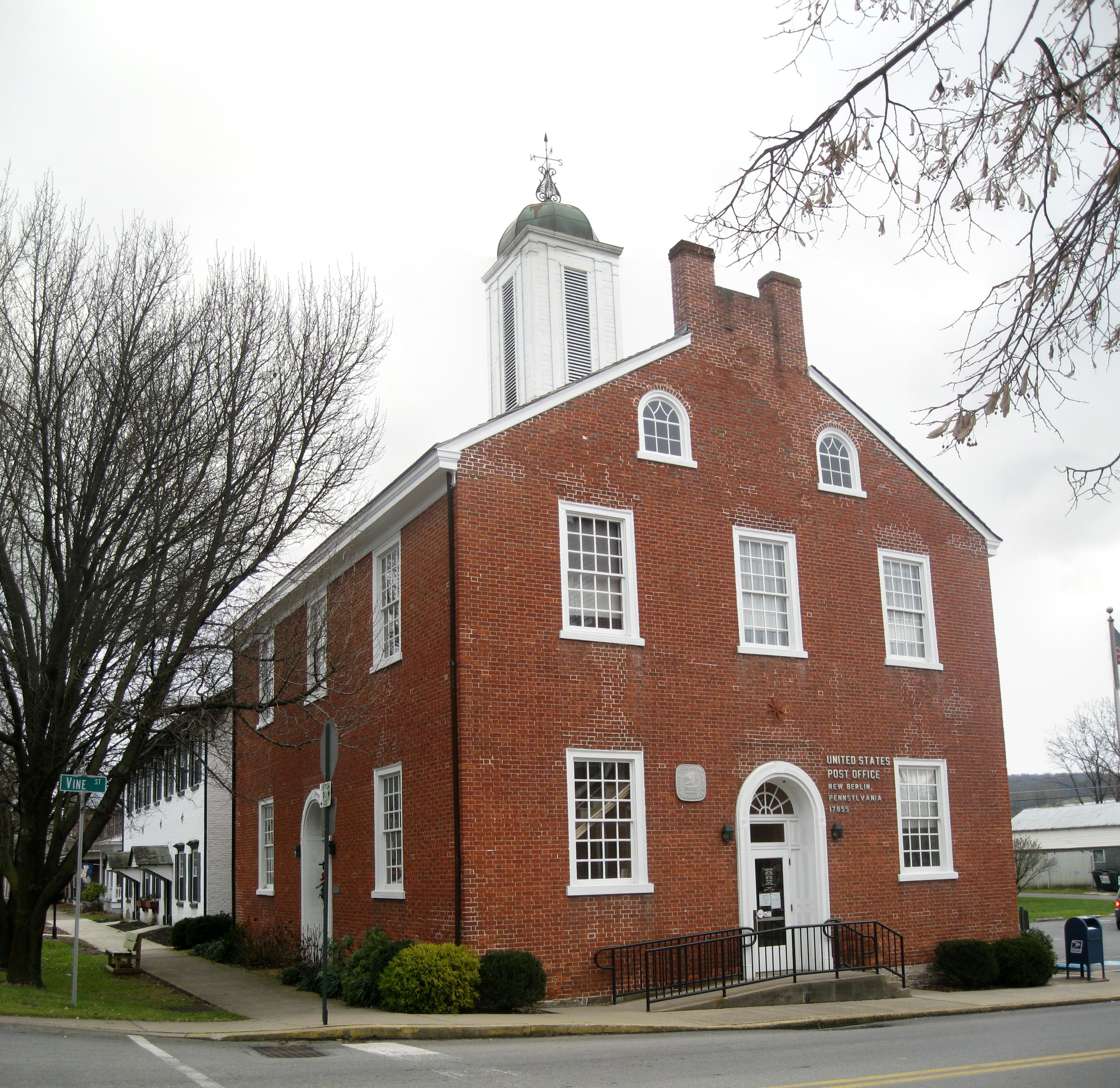
- The building in December 2012

- Location within Pennsylvania Location within the United States
- Interactive map showing the location of Old Union County Courthouse
- Location: Market and Vine Sts., New Berlin, Pennsylvania
- Coordinates: 40°52′43″N 76°59′12″W
- Area: 0.2 acres (0.081 ha)
- Built: 1815, 1855-1857
- Architectural style: Federal
- NRHP reference No.: 72001179
- Added to NRHP: November 9, 1972

The Old Union County Courthouse is an historic courthouse that is located at Vine and Market Streets in New Berlin, Union County, Pennsylvania, United States.

It was listed on the National Register of Historic Places in 1972.

== History and architectural features ==
Built in 1815 and renovated between 1855 and 1857 in order to convert the building to a schoolhouse, it was used as a school until 1952, and is a 2 1/2-story, brick building that is three bays wide and four bays deep with a gable roof. The roof features a center cupola.

It now houses the New Berlin Heritage Museum, also known as the New Berlin Post Office and the Courthouse Museum. The museum is open by appointment and on New Berlin Day, a street festival held each year at the end of August.

== See also ==
- List of state and county courthouses in Pennsylvania
