= Winfield Creek =

Winfield Creek Dry Run
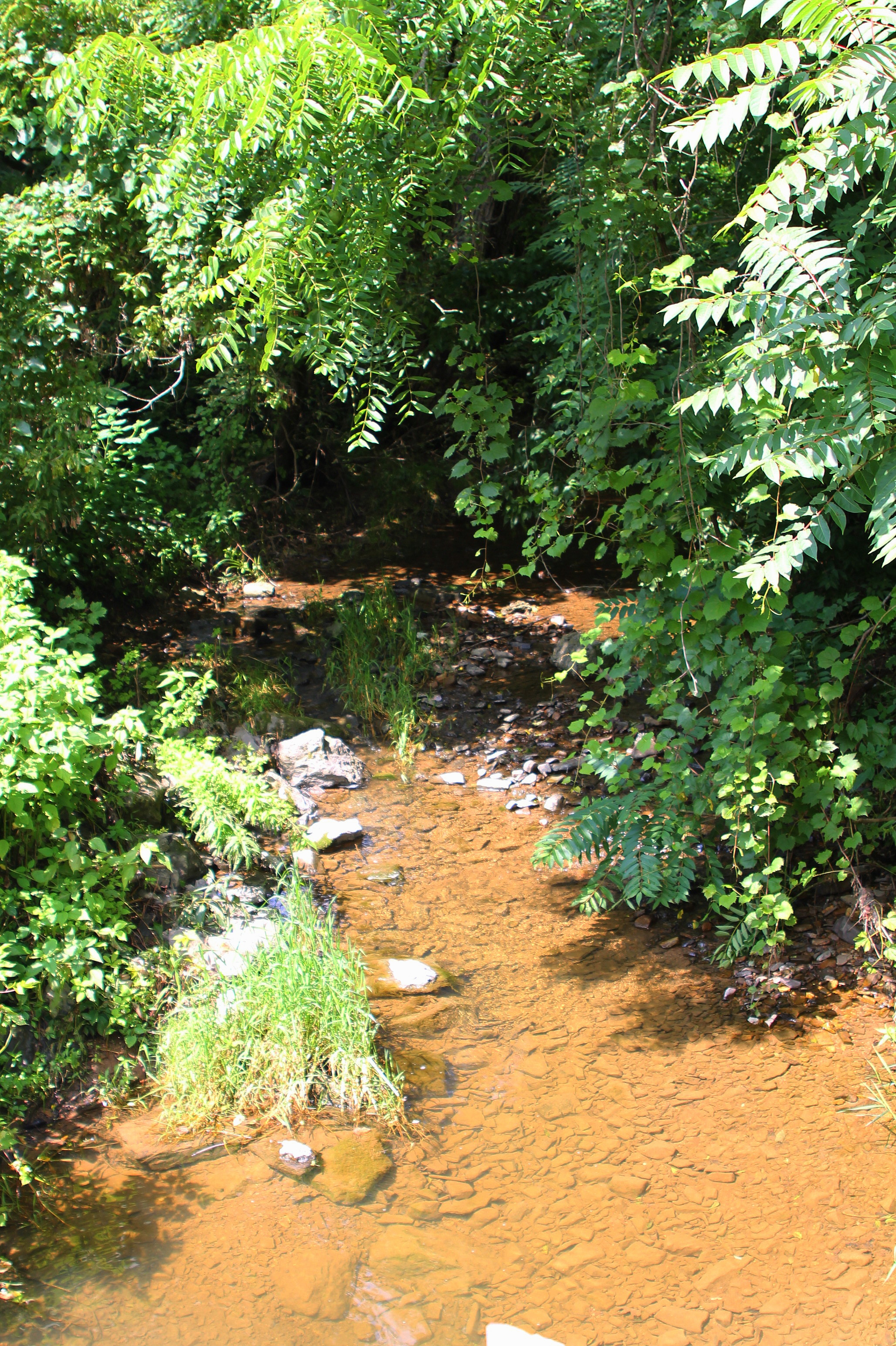
- Winfield Creek looking upstream in Winfield

Physical characteristics
- Source
  - location: valley on a ridge in Union Township, Union County, Pennsylvania
  - elevation: between 700 and 720 feet (210 and 220 m)
- Mouth
  - location: West Branch Susquehanna River in Union Township, Union County, Pennsylvania
  - coordinates: 40°54′46″N 76°51′01″W
  - elevation: 430 ft (130 m)
- Length: 4.4 mi (7.1 km)
- Basin size: 5.38 sq mi (13.9 km^{2})

Basin features
- Progression: West Branch Susquehanna River → Susquehanna River → Chesapeake Bay
- Tributaries
  - left: one unnamed tributary
  - right: three unnamed tributaries

Winfield Creek (also known as Dry Run) is a tributary of the West Branch Susquehanna River in Union County, Pennsylvania, in the United States. It is approximately 4.4 miles (7.1 km) long and flows through Union Township. The watershed of the creek has an area of 5.38 square miles (13.9 km^{2}). The creek is designated as an impaired stream, with the causes being habitat alteration and sedimentation/siltation. The creek is designated as a Warmwater Fishery and a Migratory Fishery, but is not a trout fishery.

== Course ==
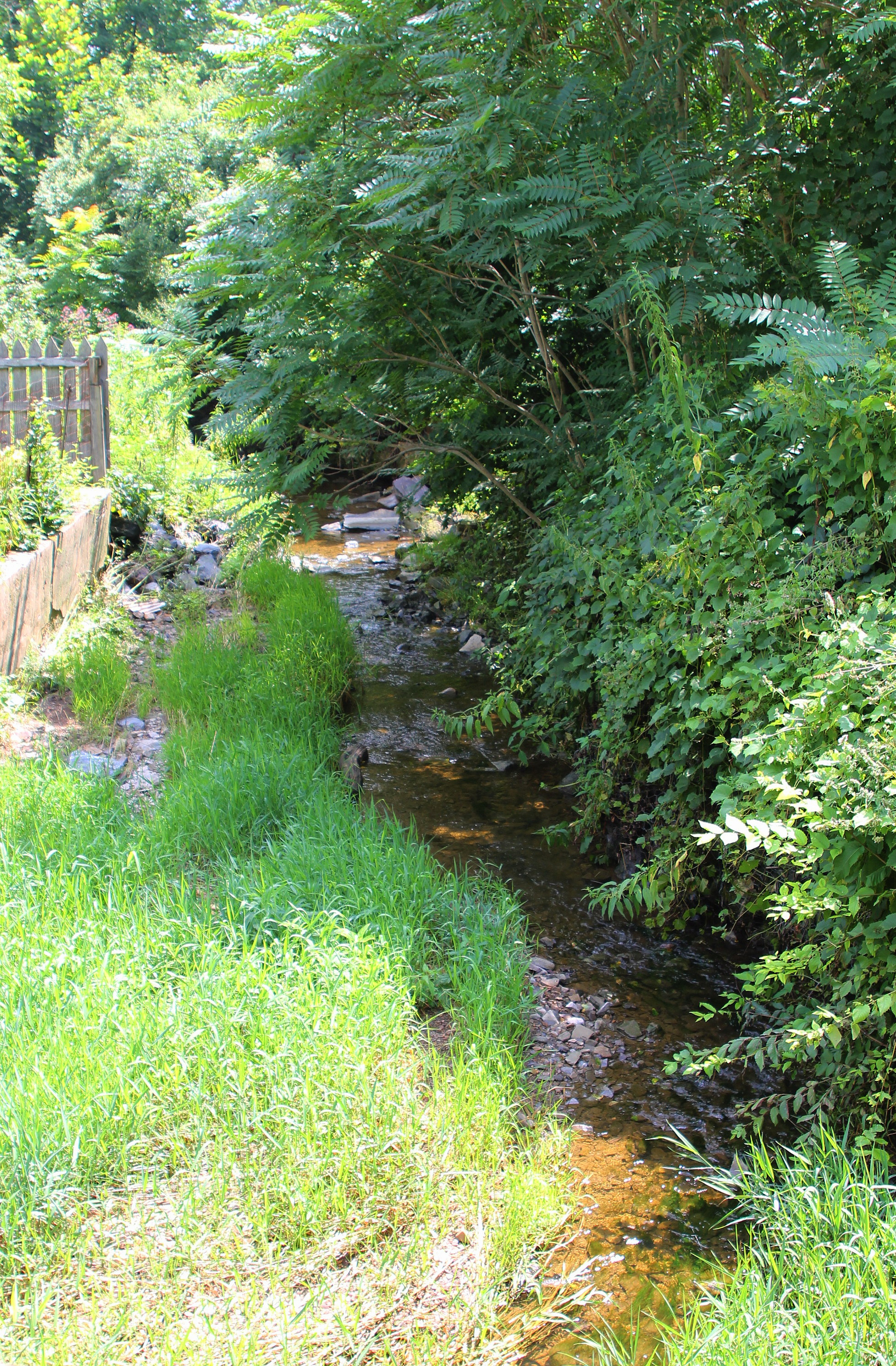
Winfield Creek looking downstream in Winfield

Winfield Creek begins in a valley on a ridge in Union Township. It flows southwest for a short distance before turning south and entering a much broader valley. The creek then turns south-southeast for a few tenths of a mile, crossing Pennsylvania Route 304 before turning east-northeast. It flows in this direction through the valley for several miles, running alongside Pennsylvania Route 304 and entering the census-designated place of Winfield. However, the creek eventually turns northeast and crosses US Route 15 before turning east. A short distance further downstream, it reaches its confluence with the West Branch Susquehanna River.

Winfield Creek joins the West Branch Susquehanna River 3.54 miles (5.70 km) upriver of its mouth, making it the final named tributary of the river.

=== Tributaries ===
Winfield Creek has no named tributaries. However, it does have four unnamed tributaries. Three join the creek on its right bank and one joins it on its left bank.

== Hydrology ==
Winfield Creek is designated as an impaired stream. The causes of the impairment are habitat alteration and sedimentation/siltation. The probably sources of the impairment are channelization and crop-related agriculture.

== Geography and geology ==
The elevation near the mouth of Winfield Creek is 430 feet (130 m) above sea level. The elevation of the creek's source is between 700 and 720 feet (210 and 220 m) above sea level.

Winfield Creek joins the West Branch Susquehanna River on its right bank. Winfield Creek is a very small stream and flows through a limestone valley. The creek flows through a narrow valley, which is bordered by Shamokin Mountain on the north and highlands on the south.

== Watershed ==
The watershed of Winfield Creek has an area of 5.38 square miles (13.9 km^{2}). The mouth of the creek is in the United States Geological Survey quadrangle of Northumberland. However, its source is in the quadrangle of Lewisburg.

== History ==
Winfield Creek was entered into the Geographic Names Information System on August 2, 1979. Its identifier in the Geographic Names Information System is 1191593. The creek has also been known as Dry Run.

In 1774, John Lee, a major in Pennsylvania's militia, received a patent from John and Thomas Penn for a tract of land known as "Lees Adventure", which was located near Winfield Creek. John Aurandt also historically owned land in the creek's vicinity. The Winfield Creek massacre occurred in 1782.

A concrete tee beam bridge carrying US Route 15 over Winfield Creek was constructed in 1930 and repaired in 1962. It is 49.9 feet (15.2 m) long and is situated in Winfield. A two-span concrete culvert bridge carrying State Route 2009 over the creek was built in 1991. It is 29.9 feet (9.1 m) long and is also in Winfield.

== Biology ==
The drainage basin of Winfield Creek is designated as a Warmwater Fishery and a Migratory Fishery. The creek is not a trout fishery. A. Joseph Armstrong described the creek as "not worth further investigation" in his book Trout Unlimited's Guide to Pennsylvania Limestone Streams.

== See also ==
- Turtle Creek (West Branch Susquehanna River), next tributary of the West Branch Susquehanna River going upriver
- List of rivers of Pennsylvania
