= New Berlin Presbyterian Church =

Historic church in Pennsylvania, United States

- U.S. National Register of Historic Places
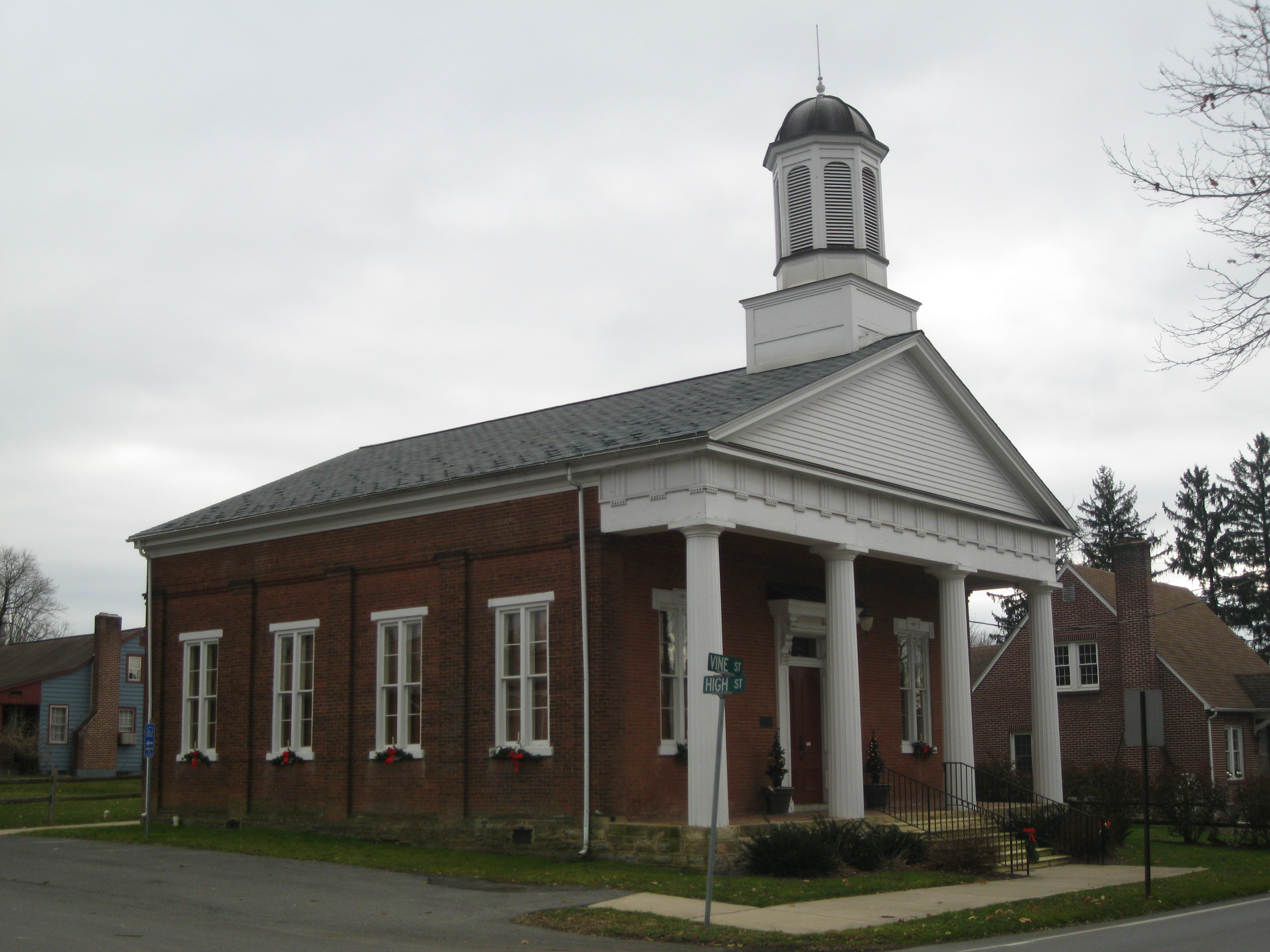
- The building in December 2012

- Location within Pennsylvania Location within the United States
- Location: Vine and High Sts., New Berlin, Pennsylvania
- Coordinates: 40°52′46″N 76°59′13″W
- Area: 0 acres (0 ha)
- Built: 1843
- Architectural style: Greek Revival
- NRHP reference No.: 72001178
- Added to NRHP: October 26, 1972

New Berlin Presbyterian Church, also known as New Berlin Community Center, is a historic Presbyterian church located at Vine and High Streets in New Berlin, Union County, Pennsylvania. It was built in 1843, and is a one-story, brick building, three bays wide and four bays deep, in the Greek Revival style. It features a portico supported by four Doric order columns and an octagonal cupola. It has been used as a community center since 1933.

It was listed on the National Register of Historic Places in 1972.
