= William A. Heiss House and Buggy Shop =

Historic house in Pennsylvania, United States

- U.S. National Register of Historic Places
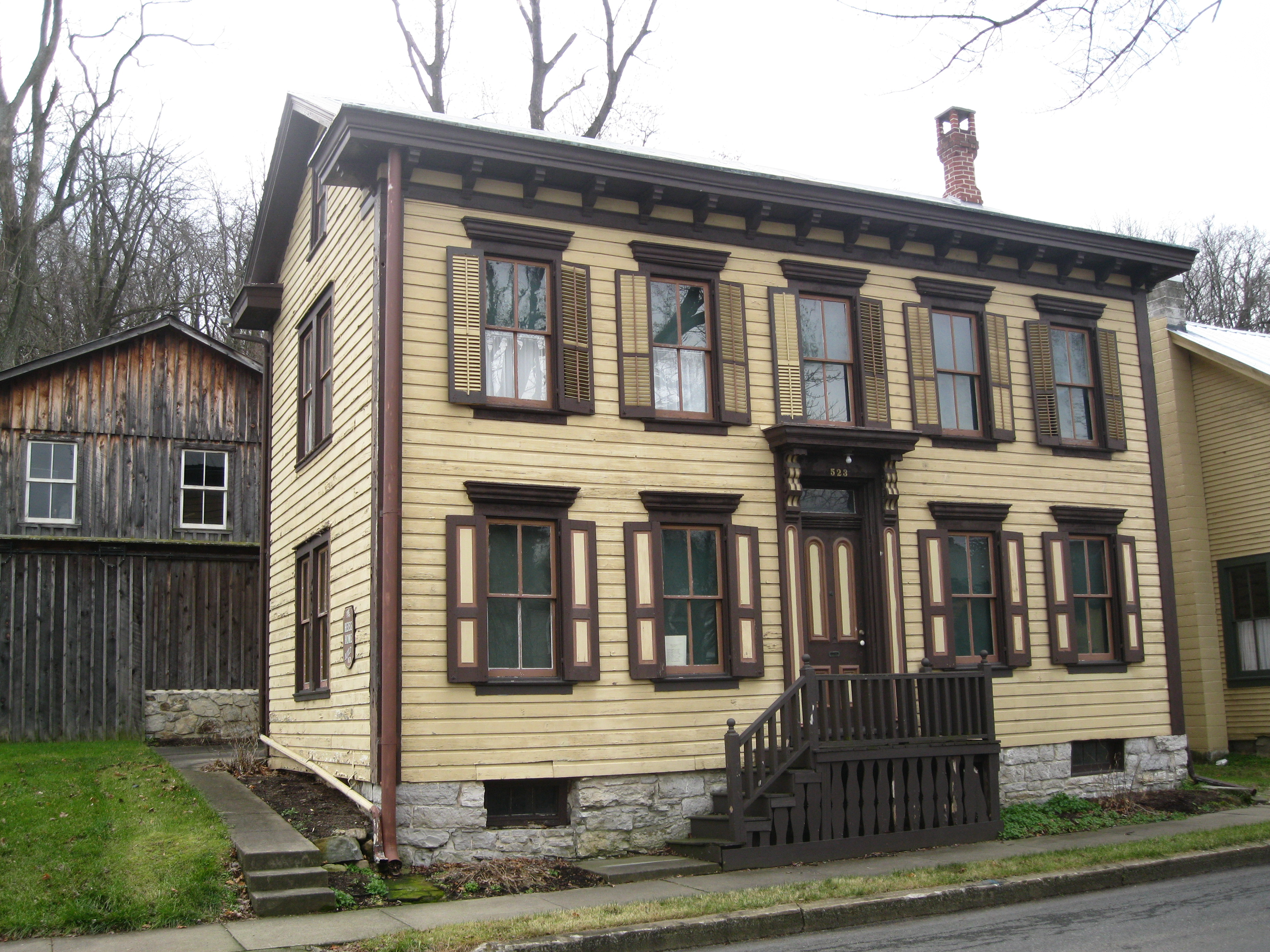
- The house in December 2012

- Location within Pennsylvania Location within the United States
- Location: 523 Green St., Mifflinburg, Pennsylvania
- Coordinates: 40°54′53″N 77°02′55″W
- Area: 2.7 acres (1.1 ha)
- Built: 1870, 1889, 1895
- NRHP reference No.: 79002348
- Added to NRHP: August 6, 1979

The William A. Heiss House and Buggy Shop is a historic home in Mifflinburg, Union County, Pennsylvania.

It was listed on the National Register of Historic Places in 1979.

== History and architectural features ==
This historic property includes three buildings: the house, the buggy shop, and the display-storage center. The house was built in 1870, and is a two-story, five-bay, frame dwelling with a rear ell. The buggy shop was built in 1889, and is a two-story, rectangular, wood-frame building that is sixty-three feet long and twenty-four feet wide. The display-storage center was built in 1895, and is a two-story, rectangular, wood-frame building that is thirty-three feet long and fifty feet wide. It is representative of the buggy manufacturers who once had a notable presence in Mifflinburg.

The property is the Mifflinburg Buggy Museum. Visitors may tour the Heiss family home, reconstructed carriage house, the original buggy factory with carriages, wagons, and sleighs and tools, and original showroom. There is a visitor center with an introductory video, self-guided exhibit and hands-on workbench.
