= Mifflinburg Historic District =

United States historic place in Mifflinburg, Pennsylvania

- U.S. National Register of Historic Places
- U.S. Historic district
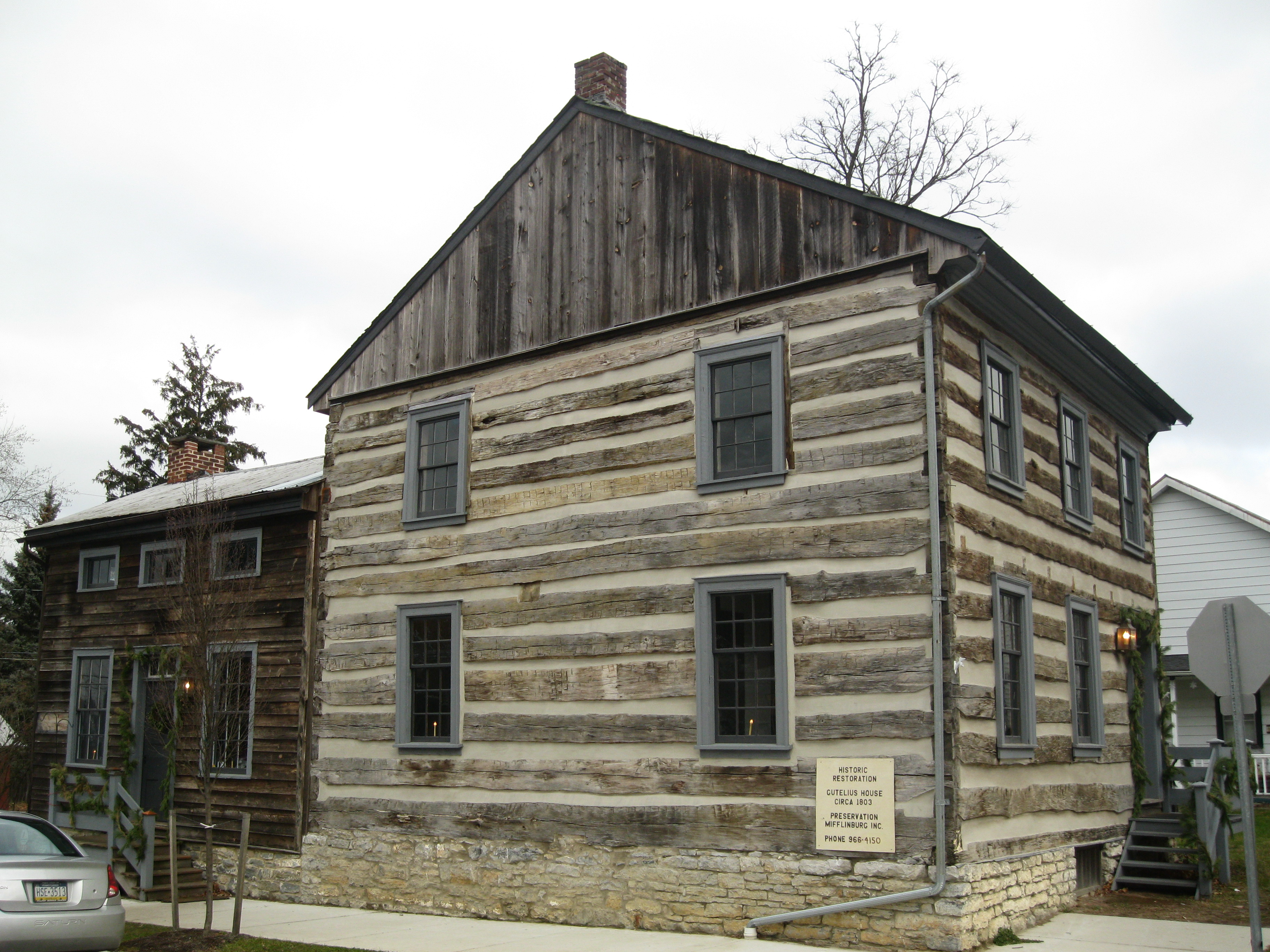
- The 1803 Gutelius House

- Location within Pennsylvania Location within the United States
- Location: PA 45, Mifflinburg, Pennsylvania
- Coordinates: 40°54′59″N 77°02′58″W
- Area: 55 acres (22 ha)
- Built: 1792
- Built by: Boop, Joseph; Palmer, Lewis
- Architectural style: Late 19th And 20th Century Revivals, Mid 19th Century Revival, Late Victorian
- NRHP reference No.: 80003643
- Added to NRHP: April 10, 1980

Mifflinburg Historic District is a national historic district located at Mifflinburg, Union County, Pennsylvania. The district includes 233 contributing buildings in the central business district and surrounding residential areas of Mifflinburg.

It was added to the National Register of Historic Places in 1980.
