= Winfield, Pennsylvania =

Unincorporated community in Pennsylvania, US

Coordinates: 40°54′33″N 76°51′19″W

- census-designated place
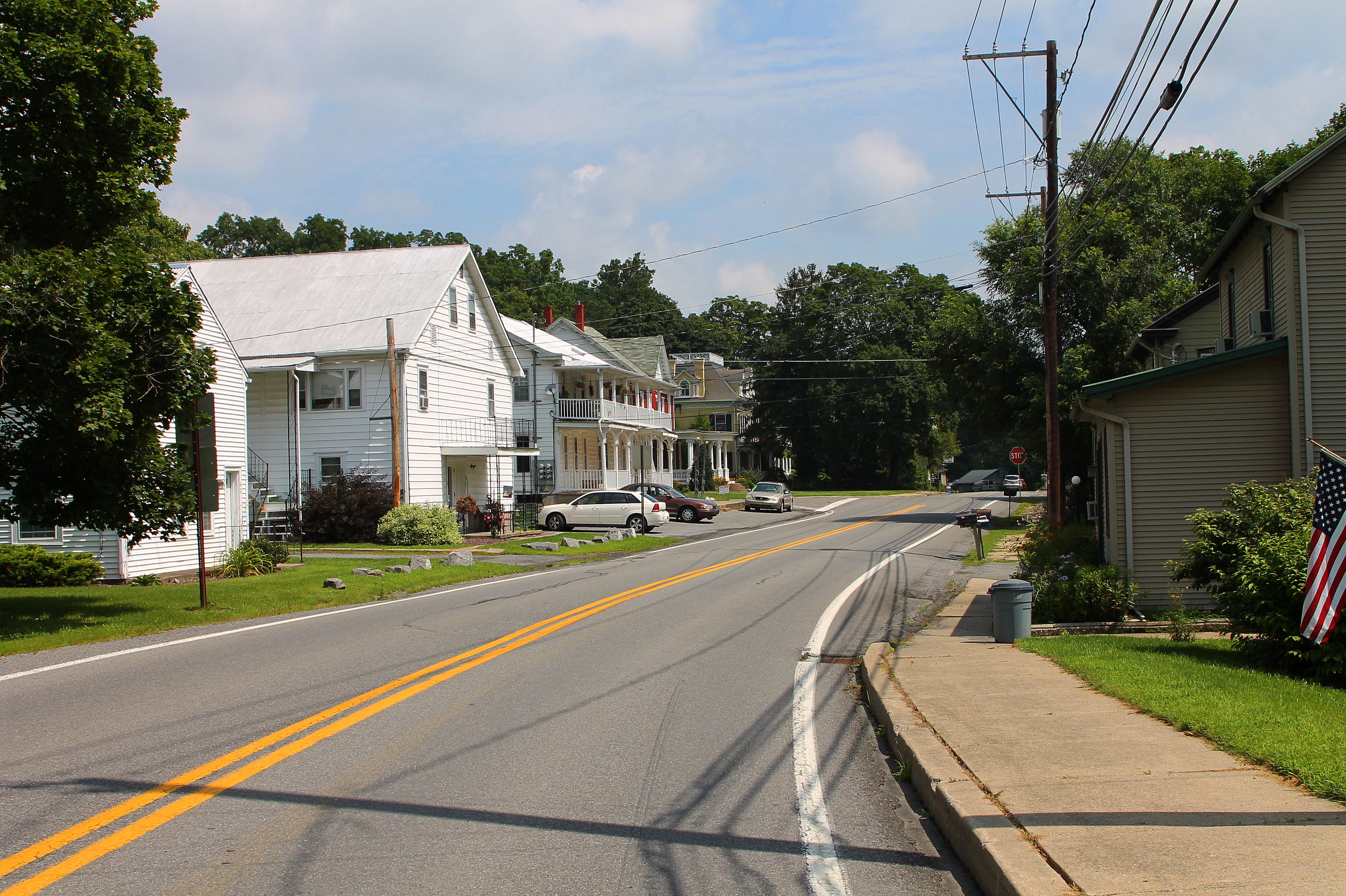
- Pennsylvania Route 304 eastbound in Winfield
- Interactive map of Winfield, Pennsylvania
- Country: United States
- State: Pennsylvania
- County: Union
- Township: Union

Population (2010)
  - Total: 900
- Time zone: UTC-5 (Eastern (EST))
  - Summer (DST): UTC-4 (EDT)
- ZIP code: 17889
- Area codes: 272 and 570

Winfield is a census-designated place located in Union Township, Union County in the state of Pennsylvania. The community is located in eastern Union County at the intersection of Pennsylvania Route 304 and U.S. Route 15, which is located along the shores of the West Branch Susquehanna River. As of the 2010 census the population was 900 residents.

== Education ==
It is in the Lewisburg Area School District.

== Notable people ==
- Carl Bennett (1922–2014), statistician
- Steve Kline (born 1972), Major League Baseball relief pitcher for five teams over an eleven-year career
- Robert Levi Rooke (1891–1994), businessman and philanthropist

== See also ==
- Winfield Creek
