= New Berlin, Pennsylvania =

Borough in Pennsylvania, US

- Borough
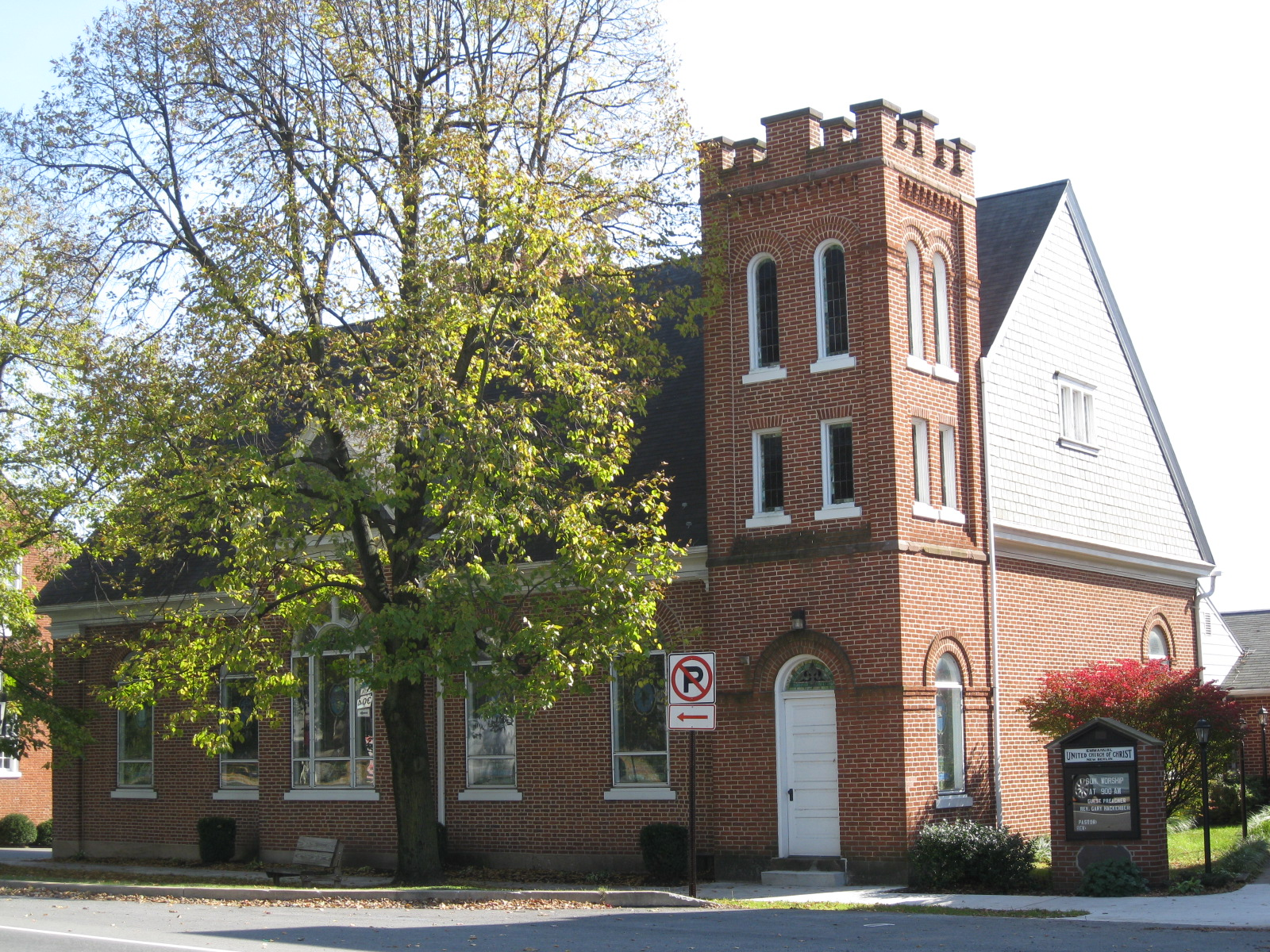
- New Berlin, Pennsylvania

- Location of New Berlin in Union County, Pennsylvania.

- Location within the U.S. state of Pennsylvania New Berlin (the United States)
- Coordinates: 40°52′49″N 76°59′11″W
- Country: United States
- State: Pennsylvania
- County: Union
- Settled: 1792
- Incorporated (borough): 1795

Area
  - Total: 0.40 sq mi (1.03 km^{2})
  - Land: 0.39 sq mi (1.00 km^{2})
  - Water: 0.012 sq mi (0.03 km^{2})
- Elevation (borough center): 540 ft (160 m)
- Highest elevation (northeastern borough boundary on south side of Shamokin Mountain): 740 ft (230 m)
- Lowest elevation (Penns Creek): 480 ft (150 m)

Population (2020)
  - Total: 802
  - Density: 2,065.3/sq mi (797.42/km^{2})
- Time zone: Eastern (EST)
  - Summer (DST): EDT
- Zip code: 17855
- Area code: 570
- FIPS code: 42-53200
- Website: www.newberlinpa.us

New Berlin is a borough in Union County, Pennsylvania, United States. The population was 802 at the 2020 census.

== History ==
The New Berlin Presbyterian Church and Old Union County Courthouse are listed on the National Register of Historic Places.

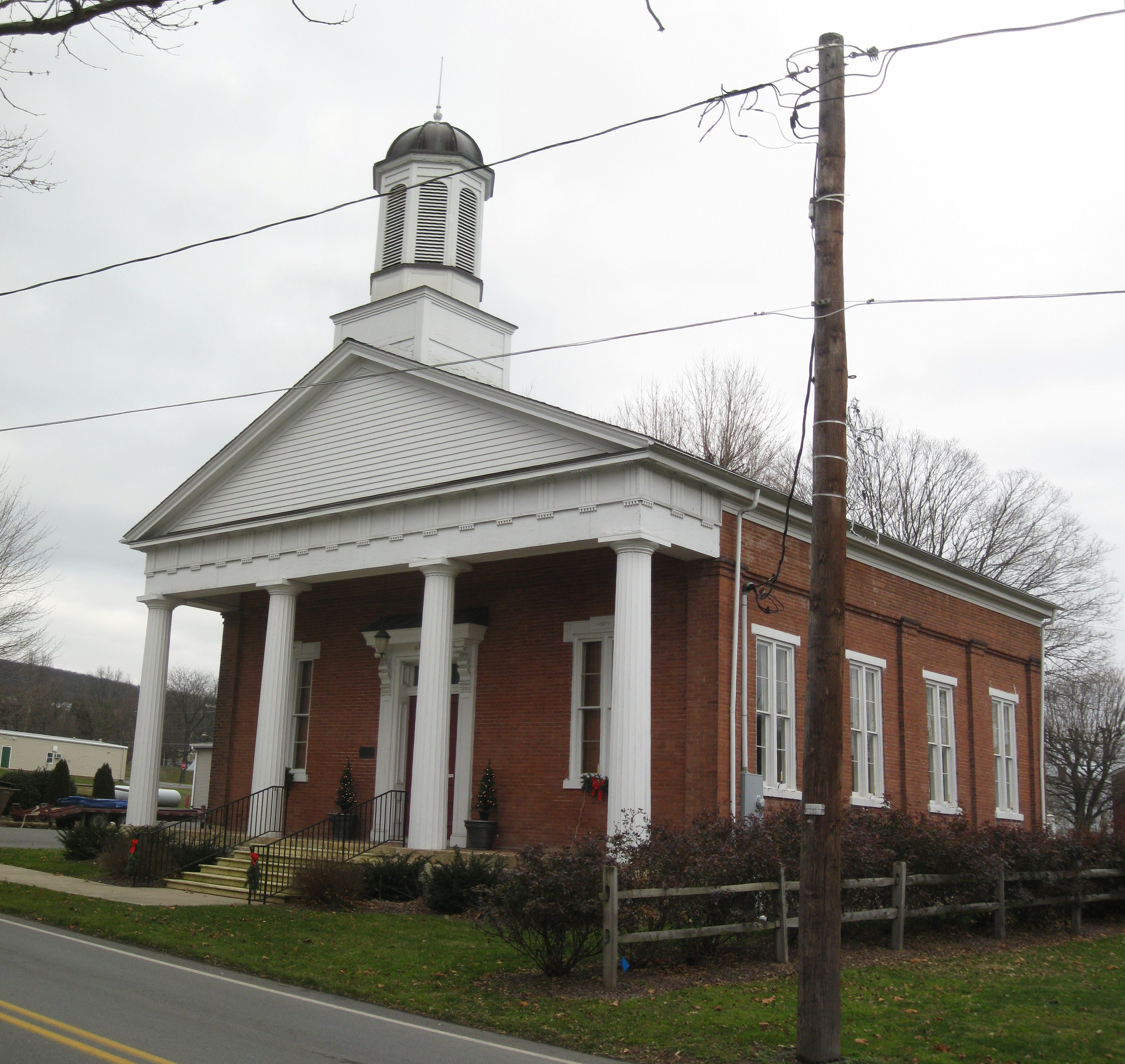
New Berlin Presbyterian Church

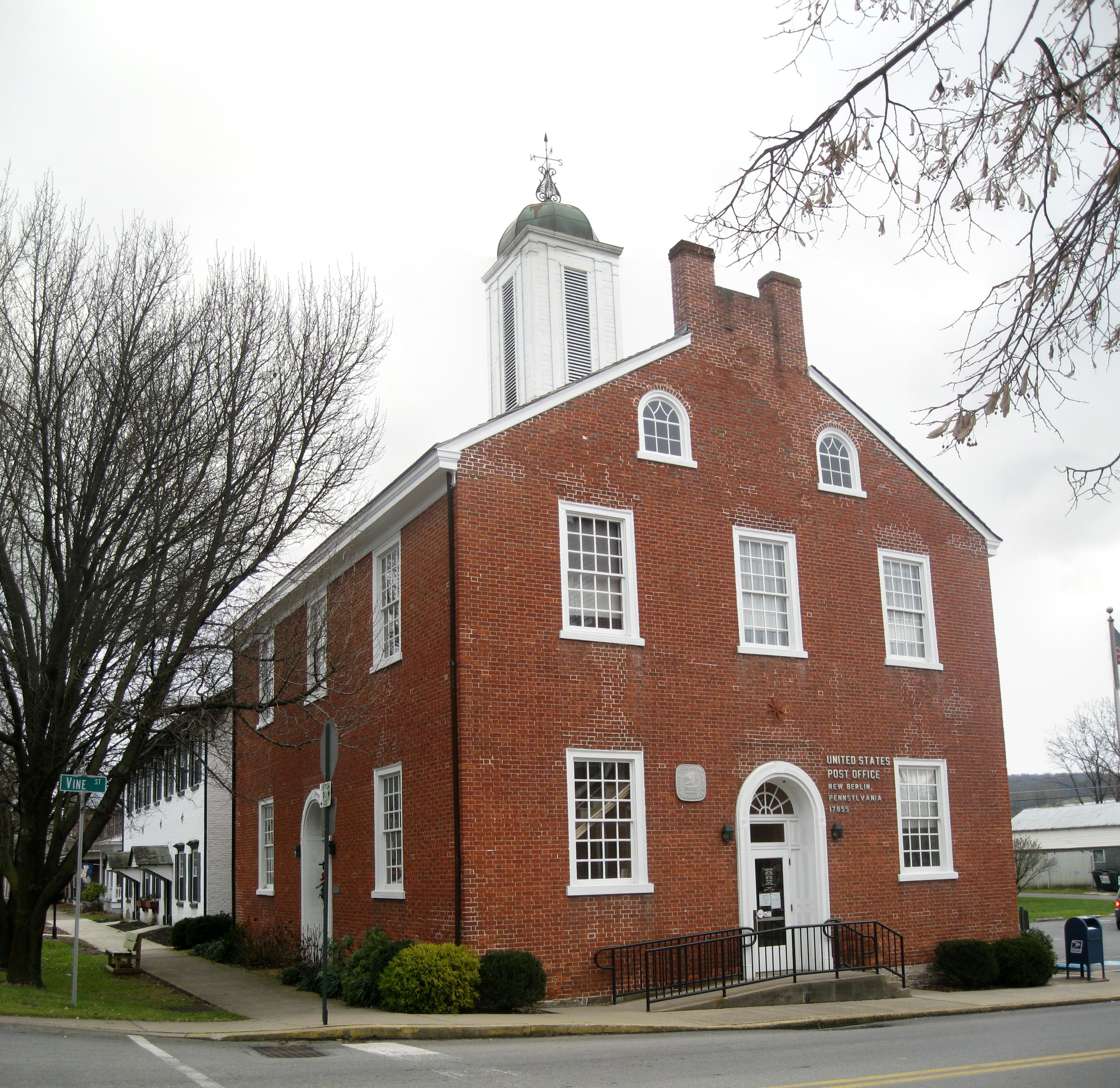
Old Union County Courthouse

== Geography ==
New Berlin is located at 40°52′49″N 76°59′11″W (40.880416, -76.986268).

According to the United States Census Bureau, the borough has a total area of 0.4 square miles (1.0 km^{2}), all land.

The Borough of New Berlin is located in central Pennsylvania, on the southern edge of Union County. It sits along the north side of Penns Creek, where the south bank of said creek is the dividing line between Union and Snyder County. New Berlin is a small borough, with a population of 802 (2020 census). Union County was created from Northumberland County on March 22, 1813, and nearby Mifflinburg was the first county seat (the first courthouse was located at 406 Green Street, with other government offices in various other buildings). New Berlin became the second seat of county government when the first courthouse built specifically for that purpose was completed in 1815. The present day county seat was moved to Lewisburg in 1855. The Old Union County Courthouse still stands on the Town Square and houses the New Berlin Post Office and the Courthouse Museum.

== Demographics ==
Historical population
Census	Pop.	Note	%±
1840	679		—
1850	741		9.1%
1860	672		−9.3%
1870	646		−3.9%
1880	695		7.6%
1890	617		−11.2%
1900	616		−0.2%
1910	527		−14.4%
1920	460		−12.7%
1930	459		−0.2%
1940	583		27.0%
1950	589		1.0%
1960	654		11.0%
1970	821		25.5%
1980	783		−4.6%
1990	892		13.9%
2000	838		−6.1%
2010	873		4.2%
2020	801		−8.2%
2021 (est.)	785	▼	−2.0%

As of the census of 2000, there were 838 people, 333 households, and 243 families residing in the borough. The population density was 1,882.4 inhabitants per square mile (726.8/km^{2}). There were 355 housing units at an average density of 797.4 per square mile (307.9/km^{2}). The racial makeup of the borough was 98.45% White, 0.24% African American, 0.60% from other races, and 0.72% from two or more races. Hispanic or Latino of any race were 0.95% of the population. Ancestries: German (41.2%), United States (11.1%), English (6.1%), Irish (5.6%), Italian (4.1%), French (3.0%).

There were 333 households, out of which 34.8% had children under the age of 18 living with them, 62.5% were married couples living together, 8.4% had a female householder with no husband present, and 27.0% were non-families. 23.1% of all households were made up of individuals, and 10.8% had someone living alone who was 65 years of age or older. The average household size was 2.52 and the average family size was 2.98.

In the borough the population was spread out, with 27.8% under the age of 18, 5.1% from 18 to 24, 32.3% from 25 to 44, 22.9% from 45 to 64, and 11.8% who were 65 years of age or older. The median age was 37 years. For every 100 females, there were 98.1 males. For every 100 females age 18 and over, there were 91.5 males.

The median income for a household in the borough was $33,523, and the median income for a family was $39,000. Males had a median income of $28,875 versus $21,528 for females. The per capita income for the borough was $16,547. About 6.3% of families and 7.7% of the population were below the poverty line, including 9.3% of those under age 18 and 2.0% of those age 65 or over.

== Government ==
The polling place is the community center, 318 Vine Street, New Berlin. As of July 2023, New Berlin's mayor was Scott Benfer.

== Education ==
It is in the Mifflinburg Area School District.

== See also ==
- Berlin, Pennsylvania
- Berlin Township, Wayne County, Pennsylvania
- Berlinsville, Pennsylvania
- East Berlin, Pennsylvania
- New Berlinville, Pennsylvania
