= Lewisburg Area School District =

School district in Pennsylvania

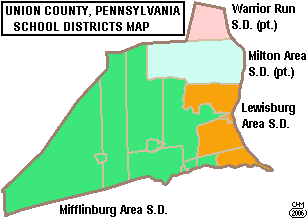

Address
- 1951 Washington Avenue Lewisburg, Union County, Pennsylvania, 17837; United States

District information
- Grades: PreK–12 (2013)

Students and staff
- District mascot: Green Dragons
- Colors: Green and white

Other information
- Website: https://www.lasd.us/

The Lewisburg Area School District is a small, rural/suburban public school district in Union County, Pennsylvania. The district encompasses an area of approximately 44.5 square miles (115 km^{2}). It serves the borough of Lewisburg, Kelly Township, East Buffalo Township and a part of Union Township. By 2010, the district's population had increased to 19,173 people. According to 2000 US Census Bureau data, it served a resident population of 17,279. The educational attainment levels for the Lewisburg Area School District population (25 years old and over) were 88% high school graduates and 34% college graduates. The district is one of the 500 public school districts of Pennsylvania.

According to the Pennsylvania Budget and Policy Center, 22.4% of the district's pupils lived at 185% or below the Federal Poverty Level as shown by their eligibility for the federal free or reduced price school meal programs in 2012. According to the US Census Bureau, the resident's 2010 annual per capita income was $19,981, while the Median Family Income was $56,587 a year. In the Commonwealth of Pennsylvania, the median family income was $49,501 and the United States median family income was $49,445, in 2010. By 2013, the median household income in the United States rose to $52,100.

Special education programs are provided by the district and the staff of the Central Susquehanna Intermediate Unit16. Occupational training and adult education in various vocational and technical fields are provided by the district and the SUN Area Technical Institute.

Lewisburg Area School District operates 4 schools: Kelly Elementary School, Linntown Intermediate School, Donald H. Eichhorn Middle School and Lewisburg Area High School.

== Extracurriculars ==
A wide variety of clubs, activities and an extensive athletics program are offered to Lewisburg Area School District students. The district is a member of the Pennsylvania Heartland Athletic Conference. The district administration played a leading role in founding the PHAC in Fall 2008.

=== Sports ===
The district funds:

Boys

- Baseball - AAAA
- Basketball- AAAA
- Bowling - AAAAAA
- Cross country - AA
- Football - AAA
- Golf - AA
- Lacrosse - AA
- Soccer - AA
- Swimming and diving - AA
- Tennis - AA
- Track and field - AA
- Wrestling - AA

Girls

- Basketball - AAAA
- Bowling - AAAAAA
- Cross country - AA
- Field hockey - A
- Golf - AA
- Lacrosse - AA
- Soccer - AA
- Softball - AAA
- Swimming and diving - AA
- Tennis - AA
- Track and field - AA

Middle school sports

Boys

- Basketball
- Cross country
- Football
- Soccer
- Wrestling

Girls

- Basketball
- Cross country
- Field hockey
- Soccer

According to Pennsylvania Interscholastic Athletics Association (PIAA) directory July 2017
