= East Buffalo Township, Union County, Pennsylvania =

Township in Pennsylvania, US

Coordinates: 40°56′00″N 76°51′59″W

East Buffalo Township, Pennsylvania
- Township
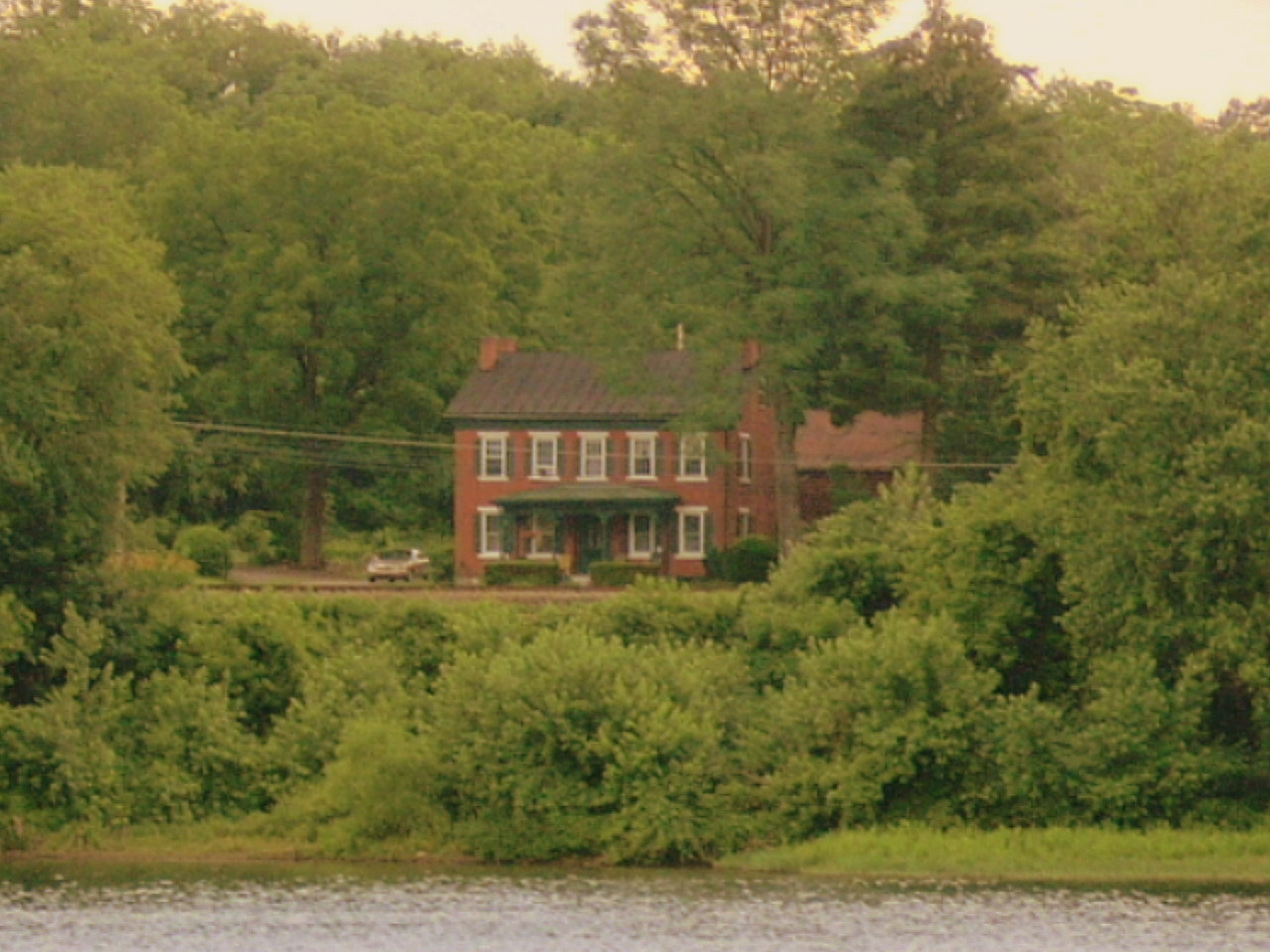
- A view from across the West Branch Susquehanna River

- Logo

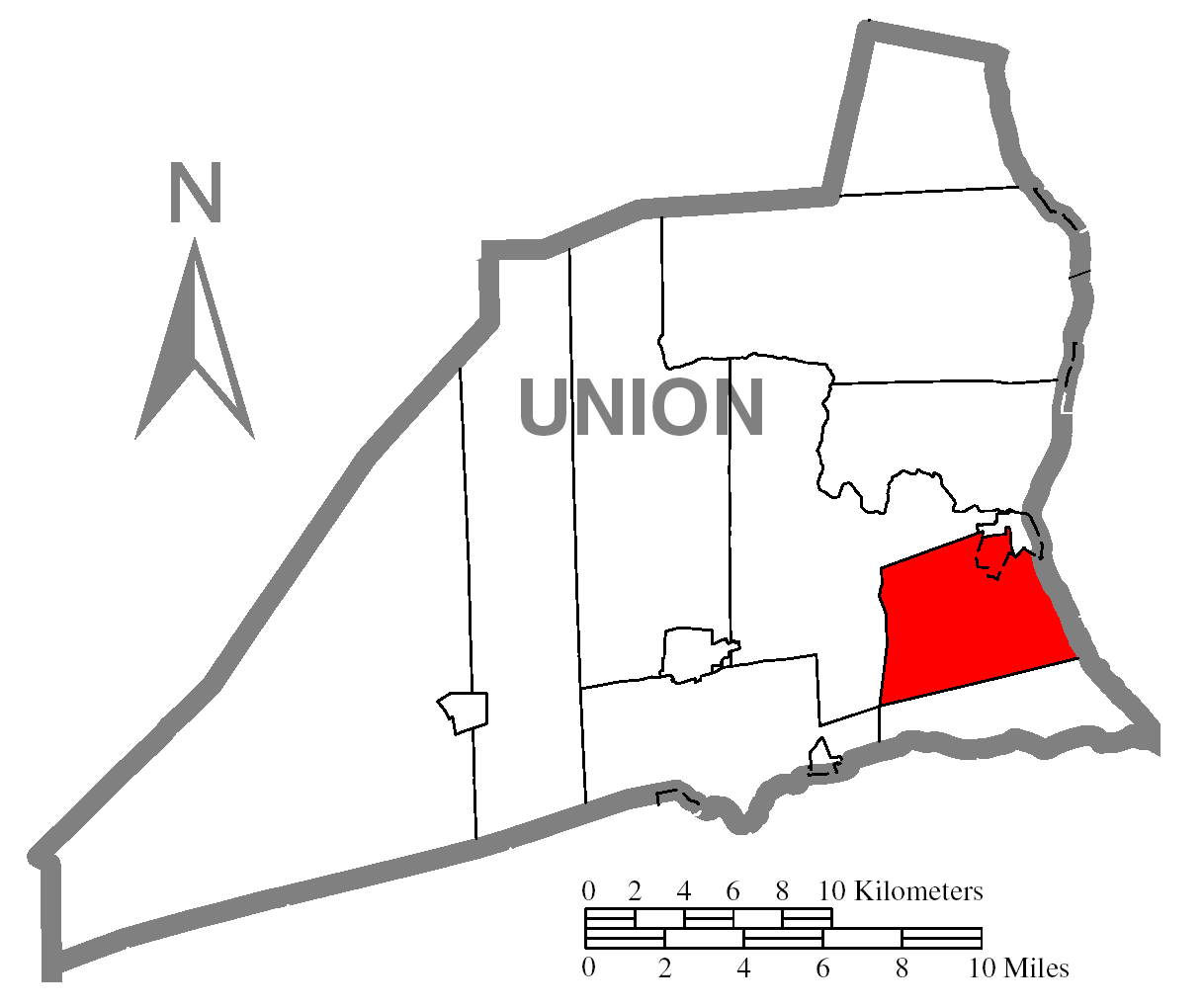
- Map of Union County, Pennsylvania highlighting East Buffalo Township

- Map of Pennsylvania highlighting Union County
- Country: United States
- State: Pennsylvania
- County: Union
- Settled: 1770
- Incorporated: 1836

Government
  - Type: Board of Supervisors
  - Chairman: James Knight
  - Vice-Chairman: Tom Zorn
  - Supervisor: Katie Evans

Area
  - Total: 15.25 sq mi (39.51 km^{2})
  - Land: 15.25 sq mi (39.49 km^{2})
  - Water: 0.012 sq mi (0.03 km^{2})

Population (2020)
  - Total: 7,421 ▲
  - Estimate (2021): 7,401
  - Density: 448.1/sq mi (173.01/km^{2})
- Time zone: UTC-5 (EST)
  - Summer (DST): UTC-4 (EDT)
- FIPS code: 42-119-20888
- Website: East Buffalo Township

East Buffalo Township is a township in Union County, Pennsylvania, United States. The population was 7,421 at the 2020 census. The township is home to Bucknell University, which lies mostly in East Buffalo Township and partly in the Borough of Lewisburg.

== History ==
The Lewisburg Armory was added to the National Register of Historic Places in 1991.

== Geography ==
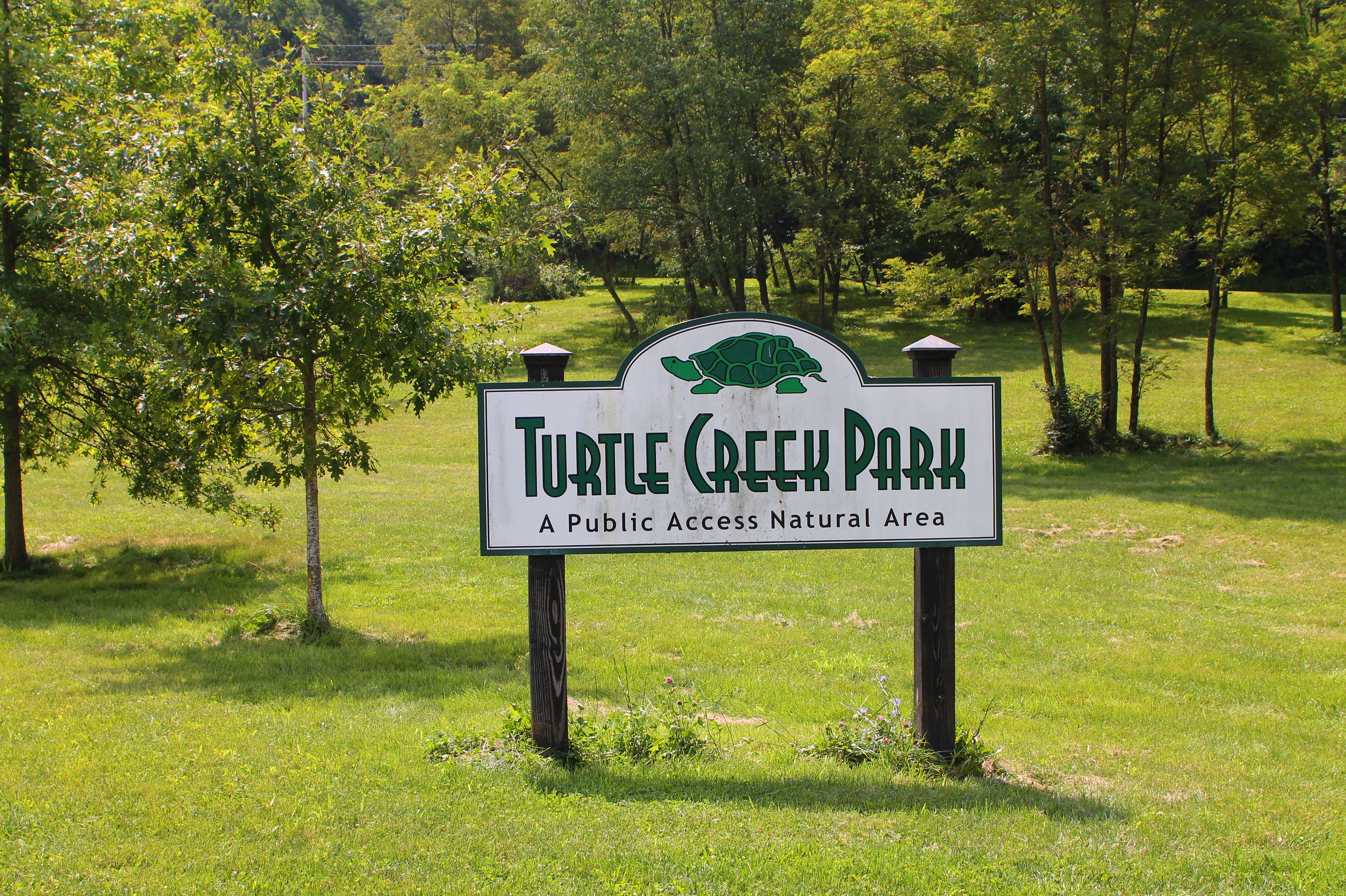
Turtle Creek Park in East Buffalo Township

According to the United States Census Bureau, the township has a total area of 15.6 square miles (40 km^{2}), all land.

East Buffalo Township is bordered by Buffalo Township to the west and north, Lewisburg to the northeast, the West Branch Susquehanna River to the east, across which lie West Chillisquaque Township and Point Township (both in Northumberland County), and Union Township to the south. The only CDP within the township is Linntown, adjacent to the southwestern side of Lewisburg.

== Demographics ==
Historical population
Census	Pop.	Note	%±
2010	6,414		—
2020	7,421		15.7%
2021 (est.)	7,401		−0.3%
U.S. Decennial Census

In 2010, the population was 6,414 people. living in 2,200 households. The average household income was $62,000.

As of the census of 2000, there were 5,730 people, 1,823 households, and 1,421 families residing in the township. The population density was 366.4 inhabitants per square mile (141.5/km^{2}). There were 1,894 housing units at an average density of 121.1 per square mile (46.8/km^{2}). The racial makeup of the township was 95.97% White, 1.20% African American, 0.03% Native American, 1.78% Asian, 0.07% Pacific Islander, 0.35% from other races, and 0.59% from two or more races. Hispanic or Latino of any race were 1.87% of the population.

There were 1,823 households, out of which 33.6% had children under the age of 18 living with them, 71.5% were married couples living together, 5.4% had a female householder with no husband present, and 22.0% were non-families. 18.7% of all households were made up of individuals, and 8.3% had someone living alone who was 65 years of age or older. The average household size was 2.58 and the average family size was 2.95.

In the township the population was spread out, with 20.8% under the age of 18, 16.0% from 18 to 24, 19.8% from 25 to 44, 25.2% from 45 to 64, and 18.2% who were 65 years of age or older. The median age was 40 years. For every 100 females, there were 94.2 males. For every 100 females age 18 and over, there were 94.0 males.

The median income for a household in the township was $62,158, and the median income for a family was $68,672. Males had a median income of $53,654 versus $30,833 for females. The per capita income for the township was $26,459. About 0.9% of families and 1.8% of the population were below the poverty line, including none of those under age 18 and 0.9% of those age 65 or over.

== Villages ==
- College Park
- West Lawn
- Linntown

== Education ==
It is in the Lewisburg Area School District.

Most of Bucknell University resides in East Buffalo Township.
