= Mifflinburg, Pennsylvania =

Borough in Pennsylvania, US

- Borough
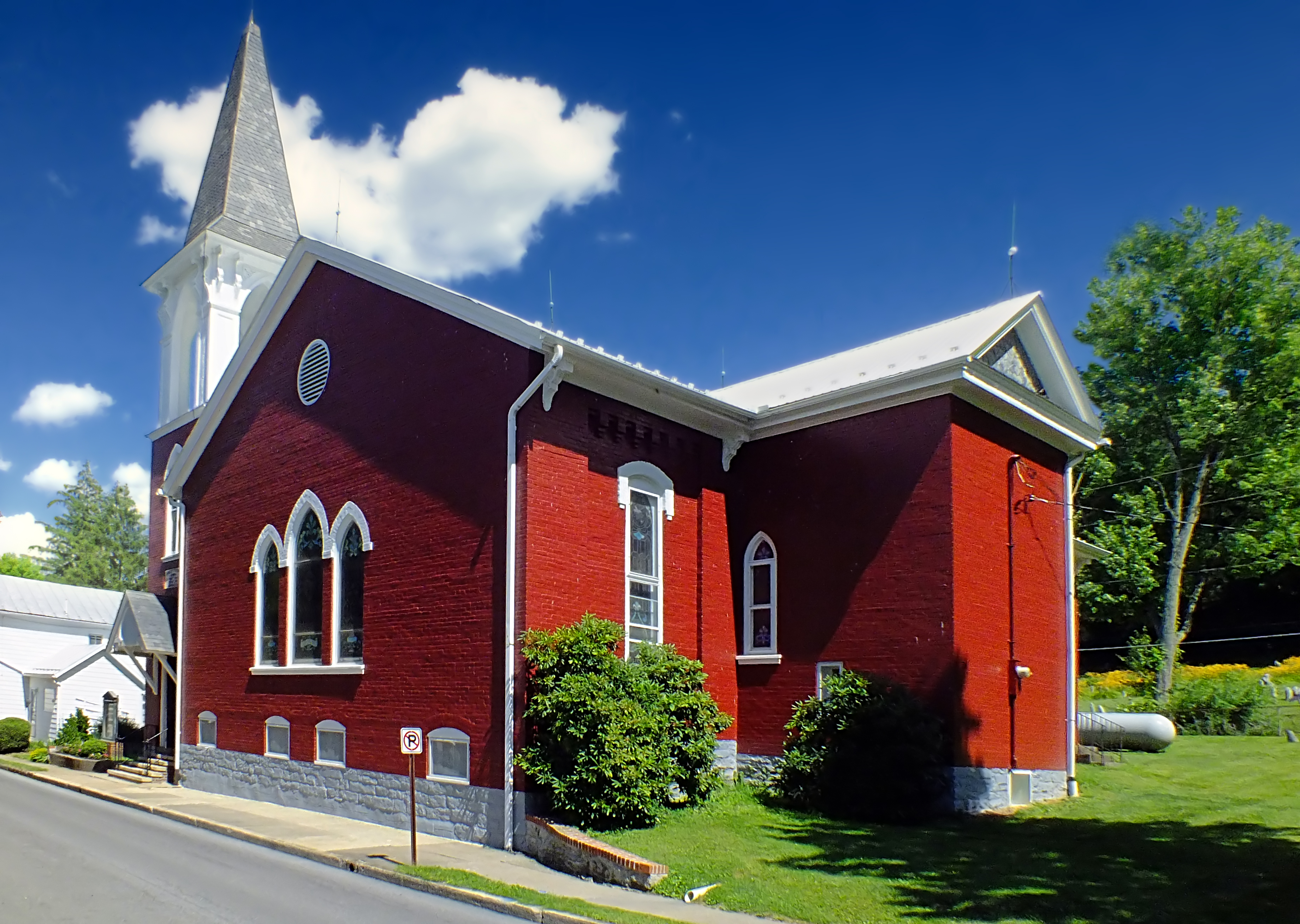
- First Presbyterian Church

- Location of Mifflinburg in Union County, Pennsylvania.

- Location in the state of Pennsylvania Mifflinburg (the United States)
- Coordinates: 40°55′08″N 77°02′48″W
- Country: United States
- State: Pennsylvania
- County: Union
- Settled: 1792
- Incorporated (borough): 1827

Area
  - Total: 1.80 sq mi (4.67 km^{2})
  - Land: 1.80 sq mi (4.67 km^{2})
  - Water: 0 sq mi (0.00 km^{2})
- Elevation (borough benchmark): 583 ft (178 m)
- Highest elevation (two hills at southern end of borough): 800 ft (240 m)
- Lowest elevation (Buffalo Creek): 530 ft (160 m)

Population (2020)
  - Total: 3,485
  - Density: 1,931.8/sq mi (745.86/km^{2})
- Time zone: Eastern (EST)
  - Summer (DST): EDT
- ZIP code: 17844
- Area codes: 570 and 272
- FIPS code: 42-49288
- Website: Borough of Mifflinburg

Mifflinburg is a borough in Union County, Pennsylvania, United States. Located in the Susquehanna River Valley of central Pennsylvania, Mifflinburg was settled in 1792 by German immigrants. As of the 2020 census, Mifflinburg had a population of 3,485.

A horse drawn buggy and carriage manufacturing company was established in 1845, and Mifflinburg become a major manufacturing center of these in the late 19th century. The Mifflinburg Buggy Museum is located here.

== History ==
The borough is situated on lands that were originally granted in 1769 to the veteran officers who served under Colonel Henry Bouquet during Pontiac's War (1763-1766) in lieu of payment for their service and ultimate victory at the Battle of Bushy Run in defense of Fort Pitt (Pittsburgh). In 1782 or 1783, Elias and Catharina Jungman (Youngman) and their children, came from Fort Augusta (now Sunbury) Pennsylvania to the Buffalo Valley with 8 other families to settle on land purchased by Elias from Catharina's father, George Nagle. In the summer of 1792, Elias surveyed and divided the land into 60' by 120' plots that were sold to other adventurous settlers, many of them German, and the village of Mifflinburg was formed (common nomenclature was attributed to the town being named "Youngmanstown", as was historically the case, but was Mifflinburg in the deeds as early as 1792). In 1797, George Rote (Rhoade) laid out a village just east of Youngmanstown, known as Greenville or Rotestown (common nomenclature). Eventually, the two settlements joined at Third Street. In 1827, the two villages combined and were incorporated. The combined village was named Mifflinburg, in honor of Thomas Mifflin, the first Governor of Pennsylvania after the 1790 Constitution. The merged towns were known as Mifflinburg before 1827 however, because when Union County was formed from Northumberland County on March 22, 1813, that PA legislative act also established Mifflinburg as the seat of government of the newly formed county, with the first courthouse located at 406 Green Street and other government offices located in various other buildings throughout the town. It remained the county seat until 1815 when it was moved to New Berlin, and then to Lewisburg in 1855 where it remains today.

In 1845, George Swentzel set up Mifflinburg's first buggy business. Soon other buggy manufacturers set up their own shops in Mifflinburg, and by 1855, with a population of 800, Mifflinburg hosted thirteen coachmakers. By the 1880s, with more than fifty buggy and sleigh factories, Mifflinburg became known as “Buggy Town” because its buggy makers produced more horse-drawn vehicles per capita than any other town in the state.

== Geography ==
Mifflinburg is located approximately 25 miles (40 km) southwest of Williamsport.

According to the United States Census Bureau, the borough has a total area of 1.8 square miles (4.7 km^{2}), all land.

=== Climate ===
Climate data for Mifflinburg, Pennsylvania
Month	Jan	Feb	Mar	Apr	May	Jun	Jul	Aug	Sep	Oct	Nov	Dec	Year
Mean daily maximum °F (°C)	37 (3)	42 (6)	52 (11)	65 (18)	76 (24)	83 (28)	87 (31)	85 (29)	77 (25)	66 (19)	52 (11)	41 (5)	64 (18)
Mean daily minimum °F (°C)	17 (−8)	20 (−7)	27 (−3)	37 (3)	46 (8)	55 (13)	59 (15)	58 (14)	51 (11)	39 (4)	31 (−1)	22 (−6)	39 (4)
Average precipitation inches (mm)	3.18 (81)	2.90 (74)	3.52 (89)	3.54 (90)	4.20 (107)	4.77 (121)	4.17 (106)	3.76 (96)	4.52 (115)	3.40 (86)	3.76 (96)	3.14 (80)	44.86 (1,139)
Source: The Weather Channel

== Demographics ==
Historical population
Census	Pop.	Note	%±
1850	783		—
1860	865		10.5%
1870	911		5.3%
1880	1,168		28.2%
1890	1,417		21.3%
1900	1,436		1.3%
1910	1,559		8.6%
1920	1,744		11.9%
1930	1,959		12.3%
1940	2,090		6.7%
1950	2,259		8.1%
1960	2,476		9.6%
1970	2,607		5.3%
1980	3,151		20.9%
1990	3,480		10.4%
2000	3,594		3.3%
2010	3,540		−1.5%
2020	3,485		−1.6%
2021 (est.)	3,404	▼	−2.3%

=== 2020 census ===
As of the 2020 census, Mifflinburg had a population of 3,485. The median age was 40.6 years. 21.8% of residents were under the age of 18 and 20.9% of residents were 65 years of age or older. For every 100 females there were 88.6 males, and for every 100 females age 18 and over there were 87.5 males age 18 and over.

0.0% of residents lived in urban areas, while 100.0% lived in rural areas.

There were 1,532 households in Mifflinburg, of which 27.0% had children under the age of 18 living in them. Of all households, 44.0% were married-couple households, 16.4% were households with a male householder and no spouse or partner present, and 31.1% were households with a female householder and no spouse or partner present. About 33.1% of all households were made up of individuals and 15.7% had someone living alone who was 65 years of age or older.

There were 1,641 housing units, of which 6.6% were vacant. The homeowner vacancy rate was 0.4% and the rental vacancy rate was 7.9%.

Racial composition as of the 2020 census
Race	Number	Percent
White	3,280	94.1%
Black or African American	56	1.6%
American Indian and Alaska Native	5	0.1%
Asian	7	0.2%
Native Hawaiian and Other Pacific Islander	0	0.0%
Some other race	28	0.8%
Two or more races	109	3.1%
Hispanic or Latino (of any race)	49	1.4%

=== 2010 census ===
As of 2010, the racial makeup of the borough was 97.5% White alone, 0.9% Hispanic, 0.6% Black alone, 0.5% two or more races, 0.3% Asian alone, 0.08% Hawaiian or Pacific Islander alone, 0.06% other race alone, and 0.03% American Indian alone.

=== 2000 census ===
As of the census of 2000, there were 3,594 people, 1,506 households, and 1,028 families living in the borough. The population density was 1,976.0 inhabitants per square mile (762.9/km^{2}). There were 1,605 housing units at an average density of 882.4 per square mile (340.7/km^{2}).

There were 1,506 households, out of which 32.1% had children under the age of 18 living with them, 55.5% were married couples living together, 9.6% had a female householder with no husband present, and 31.7% were non-families. 27.7% of all households were made up of individuals, and 13.7% had someone living alone who was 65 years of age or older. The average household size was 2.39 and the average family size was 2.91.

In the borough the population was spread out, with 25.3% under the age of 18, 7.6% from 18 to 24, 28.6% from 25 to 44, 21.9% from 45 to 64, and 16.6% who were 65 years of age or older. The median age was 38 years. For every 100 females there were 87.4 males. For every 100 females age 18 and over, there were 85.5 males.

The median income for a household in the borough was $34,906, and the median income for a family was $43,520. Males had a median income of $30,568 versus $21,315 for females. The per capita income for the borough was $17,161. About 7.6% of families and 9.9% of the population were below the poverty line, including 13.7% of those under age 18 and 8.7% of those age 65 or over.

== Economy ==
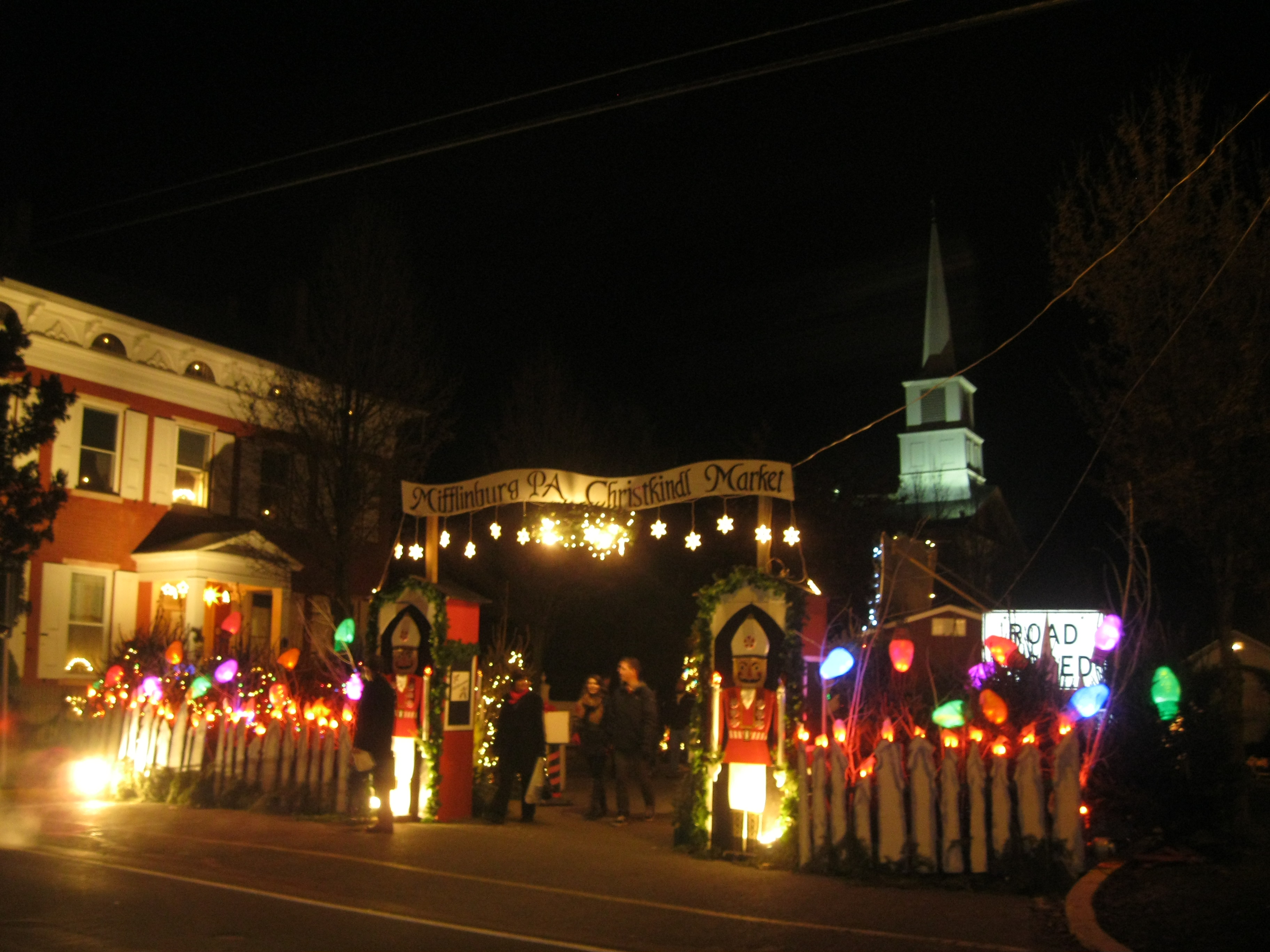
The Mifflinburg Christkindl market

Major employers include Weis Markets (a supermarket), Mifflinburg Area School District, CVS, Cole's Hardware, Ritz-Craft (a manufacturer of modular homes), and Yorktowne (a cabinetry manufacturer). In 2005, Yorktowne moved most of the Mifflinburg operations to Danville, Virginia, rather than comply with new air pollution regulations in Pennsylvania.

== Arts and culture ==
The Mifflinburg Buggy Museum features the years 1880 to 1915, when Mifflinburg was known as "Buggytown, USA" due to its reputation as a major manufacturer of horse-drawn carriages and sleighs.

"Christkindl Market" is annual German Christmas festival.

The Mifflinburg Historic District, Hassenplug Bridge, and William A. Heiss House and Buggy Shop are listed on the National Register of Historic Places.

== Education ==
Mifflinburg Area School District serves the borough of Mifflinburg and the surrounding townships in western Union County. The district operates four schools: Mifflinburg Area Elementary School (K-2), Mifflinburg Area Intermediate School (3-5), Mifflinburg Area Middle School (6-8), and Mifflinburg Area High School (9-12), along with an eLearning Academy.

== Infrastructure ==
=== Transportation ===
==== Highways ====
- Pennsylvania Route 45
- U.S. Route 15

==== Bus ====
A Fullington Trailways station is located nine miles east.

==== Rail ====
Mifflinburg was once served by the Lewisburg and Tyrone Railroad, which reached the town from Montandon and Lewisburg in 1871. It was extended west in the 1870s, forming a through line to Bellefonte, Pennsylvania completed in 1885. The line west of Mifflinburg was abandoned by Penn Central in 1970. Rail service from Lewisburg ended in 1997, and the West Shore Railroad abandoned in the line in 2008. It was subsequently converted to a rail trail. Today, the closest passenger rail access is the Lewistown Amtrak station.

==== Air ====
Williamsport Regional Airport is the nearest airport with scheduled airline service. Penn Valley Airport, a general aviation airport, is located 15 miles southeast.
