= Halfway Run =

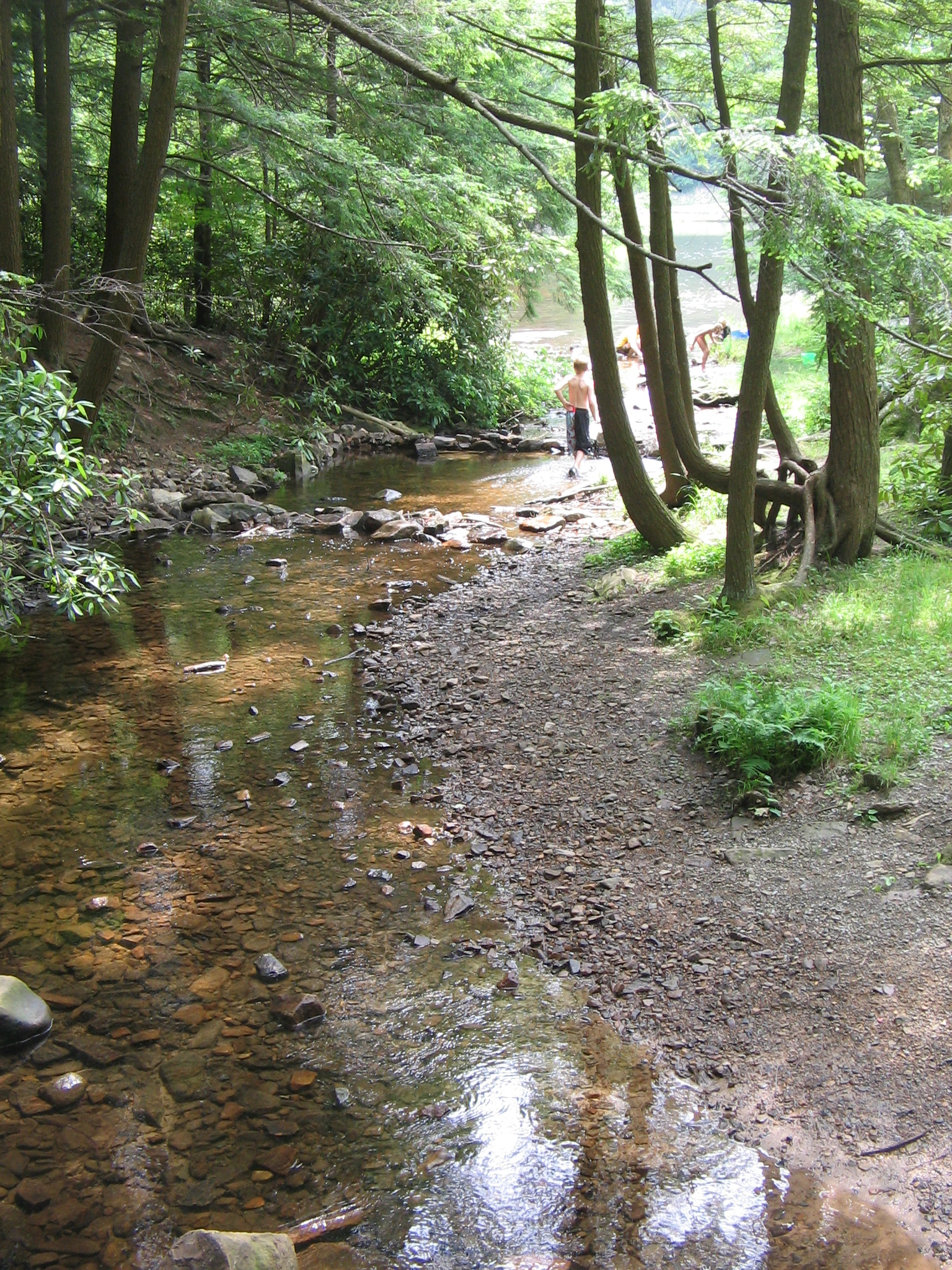
- Halfway Run near its mouth

Physical characteristics
- Source
  - location: valley in Hartley Township, Union County, Pennsylvania
  - elevation: between 1,640 and 1,660 feet (500 and 510 m)
- Mouth
  - location: Rapid Run at Halfway Lake in Hartley Township, Union County, Pennsylvania
  - coordinates: 40°59′29″N 77°11′20″W
  - elevation: 1,535 ft (468 m)
- Length: 1.8 mi (2.9 km)
- Basin size: 1.51 mi^{2} (3.9 km^{2})

Basin features
- Progression: Rapid Run → Buffalo Creek → West Branch Susquehanna River → Susquehanna River → Chesapeake Bay
- Tributaries
  - right: one unnamed tributary from Boiling Spring

Halfway Run is a tributary of Rapid Run in Union County, Pennsylvania, in the United States. It is approximately 1.8 miles (2.9 km) long and flows through Hartley Township. The watershed of the stream has an area of 1.51 square miles (3.9 km^{2}). A number of waterlogged pingo scars occur near the stream. The lake is in the vicinity of the Halfway Run Natural Area and R.B. Winter State Park. Numerous tree species inhabit the land near the stream.

== Course ==
Halfway Run begins in a valley in Hartley Township, near the border between that township and Lewis Township. It flows in a generally west-southwesterly direction alongside Bake Oven Mountain for virtually its entire length, receiving an unnamed tributary flowing from a spring called Boiling Spring. Eventually, the stream turns southwest and almost immediately enters Halfway Lake and reaches its confluence with Rapid Run.

Halfway Run joins Rapid Run 11.08 miles (17.83 km) upstream of its mouth.

== Hydrology ==
Halfway Run is not designated as an impaired water body. Halfway Run is a clear stream.

== Geography and geology ==
The elevation near the mouth of Halfway Run is 1,535 feet (468 m) above sea level. The elevation of the stream's source is between 1,640 and 1,660 feet (500 and 510 m) above sea level. The stream has a width of approximately 10 feet (3.0 m).

Halfway Run was originally part of the headwaters of Elk Creek. However, approximately one million years ago, the stream and Rapid Run moved from the Penns Creek drainage basin to the West Branch Susquehanna River drainage basin.

A number of waterlogged pingo scars occur in the vicinity of Halfway Run. Before these pingo scars were discovered, the only known pingo scars in the United States were located on a plain in Illinois. Muck in some of the more sizable pingos along the stream is up to 15 feet (4.6 m) deep and contains plant parts such as wood that are 12,800 years old. Near the stream's headwaters, the scars appear to merge.

== Watershed ==
The watershed of Halfway Run has an area of 1.51 square miles (3.9 km^{2}). The stream is entirely within the United States Geological Survey quadrangle of Hartleton.

Halfway Run is in the vicinity of the Halfway Run Natural Area. Additionally, R.B. Winter State Park is located near the stream.

== History ==
Halfway Run was entered into the Geographic Names Information System on August 2, 1979. Its identifier in the Geographic Names Information System is 1176390.

== Biology ==
Wild trout naturally reproduce in Halfway Run from its headwaters downstream to its mouth. Mature forests consisting of white pines and hemlocks occur along Halfway Run. Further away from the stream, trees such as red oak, white oak, yellow birch, sugar maple, and American beech grow. Mountain laurel is also found in the area. Hemlock seedlings and larch trees also occur in a few of the drier pingo scars. Sphagnum moss and low blueberry bushes also inhabit the area and there are some wet, grassy patches.

Beavers historically made dams in the watershed of Halfway Run and one dam still impounds water. The Halfway Run Site is listed on the Union County Natural Areas Inventory. It is inhabited by a federally endangered bulrush and is also used as a breeding ground for amphibians. There are a number of vernal pools at the site.

== See also ==
- Yankee Run, next tributary of Rapid Run going upstream
- List of rivers of Pennsylvania
