= Rapid Run (Buffalo Creek tributary) =

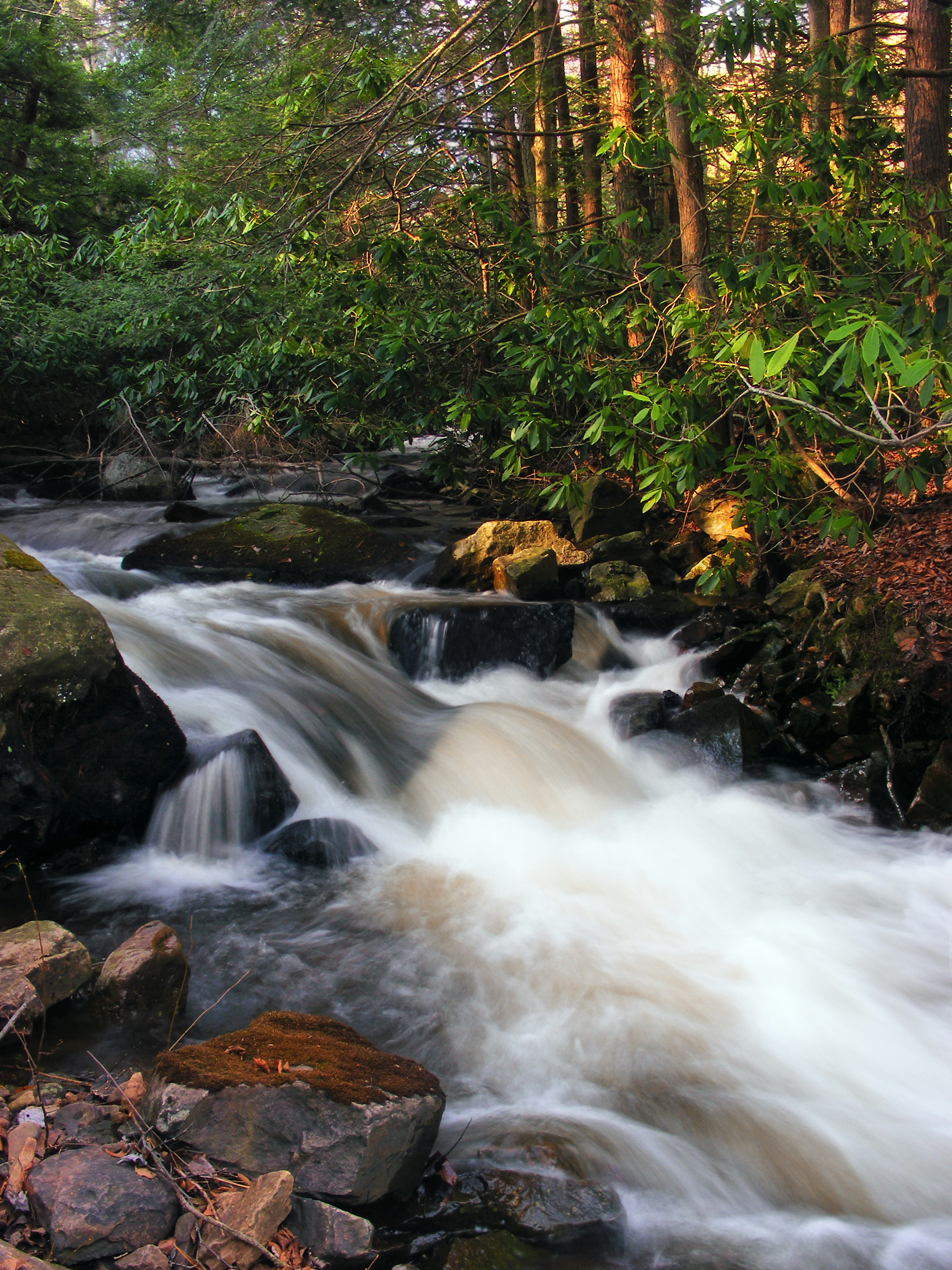
- Rapids on Rapid Run

Physical characteristics
- Source
  - location: valley in Miles Township, Pennsylvania
  - elevation: between 1,620 and 1,640 feet (490 and 500 m)
- Mouth
  - location: Buffalo Creek in Buffalo Township, Union County, Pennsylvania
  - coordinates: 40°57′27″N 77°00′41″W
  - elevation: 512 ft (156 m)
- Length: 14.4 mi (23.2 km)
- Basin size: 18.7 sq mi (48 km^{2})

Basin features
- Progression: Buffalo Creek → West Branch Susquehanna River → Susquehanna River → Chesapeake Bay
- Tributaries
  - left: Yankee Run, Halfway Run

Rapid Run is a tributary of Buffalo Creek in Centre County and Union County in Pennsylvania, in the United States. It is approximately 14.4 miles (23.2 km) long and flows through Miles Township in Centre County and Hartley Township, Lewis Township, West Buffalo Township, and Buffalo Township in Union County. The watershed of the stream has an area of 18.7 square miles (48 km^{2}). Some streams in the watershed are impacted by nutrients, sediment, E. coli, and thermal radiation and one unnamed tributary is designated as an impaired waterbody. Rapid Run is a freestone mountain stream in the ridge and valley physiographic province. It flows through a lake known as Halfway Lake and also passes through the Rapid Run Gap.

Rapid Run is one of the major tributaries of Buffalo Creek. Its watershed is mostly forested, but there is some agricultural land and impervious surfaces as well. Pennsylvania Route 192 runs alongside the stream for much of its length. A number of bridges have been constructed across the stream. The drainage basin is designated as a High-Quality Coldwater Fishery and a Migratory Fishery. Additionally, a reach of Rapid Run is Class A Wild Trout Waters. Various eels and freshwater sponges have also been observed in the stream. Rapid Run flows through Bald Eagle State Forest, R.B. Winter State Park, and Sand Bridge State Park.

== Course ==
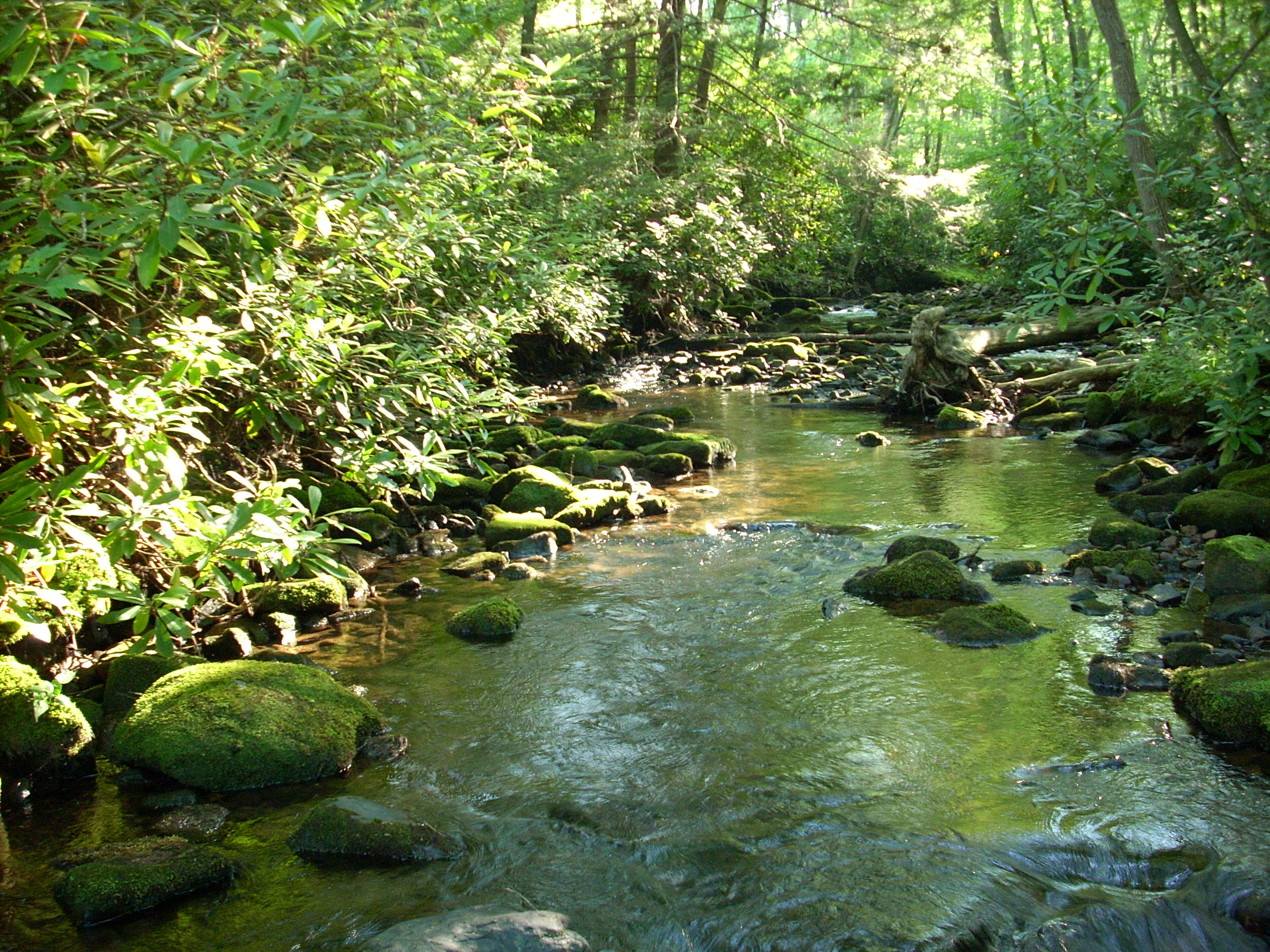
Rapid Run in Sand Bridge State Park

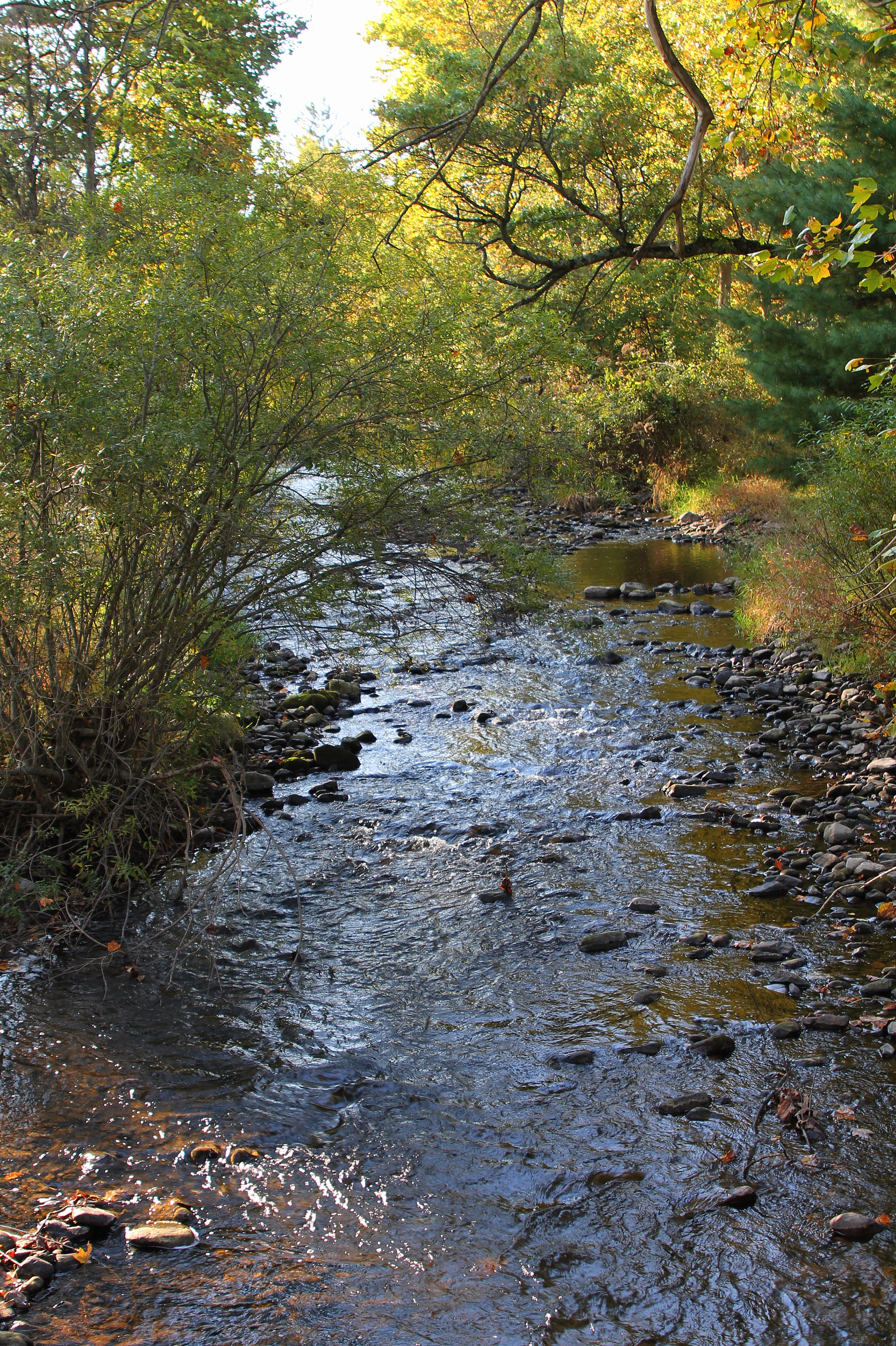
Rapid Run near its mouth

Rapid Run begins in a valley in Miles Township, Centre County. It flows in a generally east-northeasterly direction for a few miles and receives the tributary Yankee Run from the left before entering Hartley Township, Union County. In this township, the stream crosses Pennsylvania Route 192 and passes by a spring called The Little Bubbler. The stream then turns south-southeast, passing through Halfway Lake, where it receives the tributary Halfway Run from the left. From the southern end of the lake, it continues flowing south-southeast, crossing Pennsylvania Route 192 again and entering a considerably narrower valley that it shares with Route 192. It passes by Bake Oven Mountain and Seven Notch Mountain for several tenths of a mile before turning east-northeast to stay in the valley.

After more than a mile, Rapid Run enters Lewis Township, Union County. Here it continues flowing east in its valley, alongside Pennsylvania Route 192 and Jones Mountain. The stream crosses Pennsylvania Route 192 twice and spends several miles in Lewis Township before entering West Buffalo Township. In West Buffalo Township, it continues heading east for more than a mile before crossing Pennsylvania Route 192 one last time and turning east-southeast. The stream then leaves its narrow valley and flows alongside a much shallower, broader one that it shares with Stony Run. After a few miles, it enters Buffalo Township, where it continues flowing southeast. After several tenths of a mile (about 0.5 km), it reaches its confluence with Buffalo Creek.

Rapid Run joins Buffalo Creek 10.22 miles (16.45 km) upstream of its mouth.

=== Tributaries ===
Rapid Run has two named tributaries: Yankee Run and Halfway Run. Yankee Run joins Rapid Run 13.34 miles (21.47 km) upstream of its mouth and its watershed has an area of 0.83 square miles (2.1 km^{2}). Halfway Run joins Rapid Run 11.08 miles (17.83 km) upstream of its mouth and its watershed has an area of 1.51 square miles (3.9 km^{2}).

== Hydrology ==
A total of 4.1 miles (6.6 km) of tributaries to Rapid Run are designated as impaired waterbodies. The cause of the impairment is nutrients and siltation. The source of the impairment is grazing-related agriculture. The total maximum daily load date is 2015. In addition to nutrients and sediment, the watershed is impacted by E. coli and thermal radiation. At the point where the stream drains 3.50 square miles (9.1 km^{2}), the average daily discharge is 6.59 cubic feet per second (0.187 m^{3}/s). Further downstream, where it drains 10.74 square miles (27.8 km^{2}), its average daily discharge is 20.22 cubic feet per second (0.573 m^{3}/s). At the point where it drains 14.53 square miles (37.6 km^{2}), the average daily discharge is 27.35 cubic feet per second (0.774 m^{3}/s).

In 2000, the sediment load in Rapid Run was 1,475,373 pounds (669,218 kg), while in 2008, it was 1,426,011 pounds (646,828 kg). This equates to a sediment load of slightly over 100 pounds per acre (110 kg/ha) per year. However, in the future, the load could be reduced by 54.86 percent to 643,635 pounds (291,948 kg) per year. In 2000, 610,439 pounds (276,890 kg) of sediment came from streambank erosion, 327,197 pounds (148,414 kg) came from row crops, 24,774 pounds (11,237 kg) came from low-density urban land, 20,857 pounds (9,461 kg) came from hay and pastures, and 7,024 pounds (3,186 kg) came from unpaved roads. Other sources contributed 485,082 pounds (220,029 kg) of sediment.

The nitrogen loads of Rapid Run in 2000 and 2008 were 45,102 and 44,593 pounds (20,458 and 20,227 kg), respectively. This equates to less than 5 pounds per acre (5.6 kg/ha) per year. However, the annual load could potentially be reduced by 20.43 percent to 35,482 pounds (16,094 kg). In 2000, 24,302 pounds (11,023 kg) of nitrogen came from groundwater/subsurface, 1,975 pounds (896 kg) came from row crops, 647 pounds (293 kg) came from hay and pastures, 186 pounds (84 kg) came from low-density urban land, and 139 pounds (63 kg) came from septic systems. 56 pounds (25 kg) came from unpaved roads, 31 pounds (14 kg) came from streambank erosion, and 2,364 pounds (1,072 kg) came from miscellaneous sources.

In 2000, the phosphorus load in Rapid Run was 2,054 pounds (932 kg) and in 2008, it was 2,010 pounds (910 kg). This equates to less than 0.2 pounds per acre (0.22 kg/ha) per year. In the future, the annual load could be reduced by up to 27.91 percent, bringing it down to 1,449 pounds (657 kg). In 2000, groundwater/subsurface contributed 732 pounds (332 kg) of phosphorus to the stream, row crops contributed 248 pounds (112 kg), and hay/pastures contributed 63 pounds (29 kg). Low-density urban land contributed 31 pounds (14 kg), septic systems contributed 19 pounds (8.6 kg), streambank erosion contributed 13 pounds (5.9 kg), and unpaved roads contributed 7 pounds (3.2 kg). 231 pounds (105 kg) of phosphorus came from miscellaneous sources.

The concentration of alkalinity in Rapid Run between Buffalo Trail and T-383 is 3 milligrams per litre (0.00019 lb/cu ft).

== Geography, geology, and climate ==
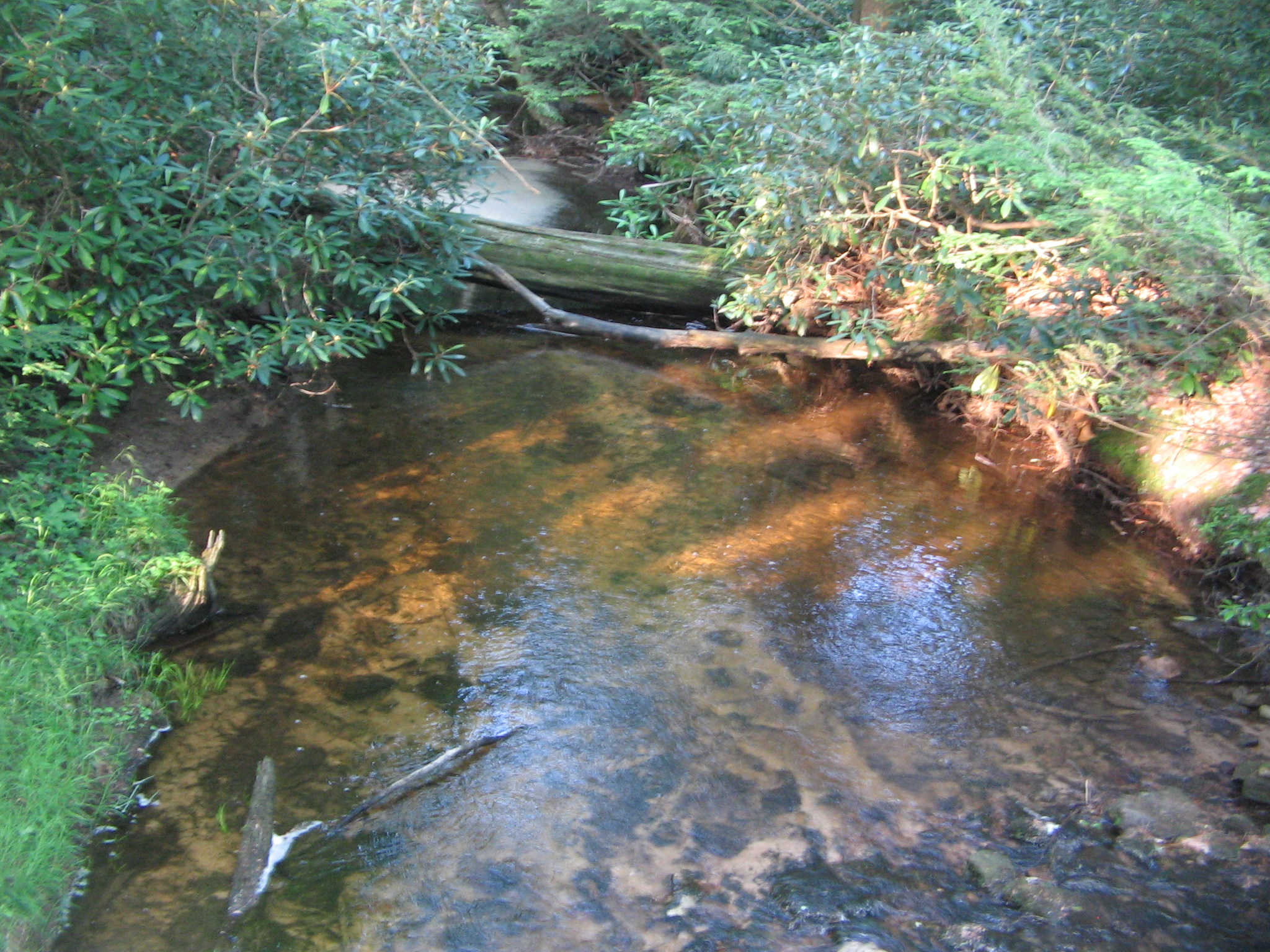
Rapid Run in R.B. Winter State Park

The elevation near the mouth of Rapid Run is 512 feet (156 m) above sea level. The elevation of the stream's source is between 1,620 and 1,640 feet (490 and 500 m) above sea level. Rapid Run is a mountain stream.

A lake known as Halfway Lake is located on Rapid Run. It has an area of 7 acres (2.8 ha) and is fed by streams and springs. The lake has a sandstone dam. Rapid Run is a freestone stream in the ridge and valley physiographic province.

Upstream of Halfway Lake, Rapid Run flows through a valley known as Brush Valley. Downstream of the lake, it exits this valley through a deep water gap. The water gap contains a slope covered in quartzite boulders, some of which have diameters of more than 6 feet (1.8 m). Additionally, terrace ridges such as Oven Mountain and Brush Mountain, which have elevations of 1,800 to 1,900 feet (550 to 580 m), are in the watershed. The Rapid Run Gorge is located in the watershed of Rapid Run, just south of Halfway Lake. In the gorge, all five of the rock formations that make up the area's mountains occur: the Reedsville Formation, the Bald Eagle Formation, the Juniata Formation, the Tuscarora Formation, and the Rose Hill Formation.

In the water gap of Rapid Run, a number of sedimentary rock formations are exposed along Pennsylvania Route 192. These rock formations mainly consist of shales, sandstones, and conglomeratic sandstones that date to the Ordivician and Silurian periods. The strata in the stream's water gap are all inclined to the southeast. Jökulhlaup surfaces with a length of more than 6 kilometers (3.7 mi) and up to 1.2 kilometers (0.75 mi) wide occur in the vicinity of Rapid Run. There also used to be an ice-dammed lake near the stream. This ice-dammed lake was the largest in the area, with a volume of 0.973 cubic kilometers (0.233 cu mi). It had an area of 6.61 square kilometers (2.55 sq mi) and a depth of 90 meters (300 ft).

The upper reaches of Rapid Run and its tributary Halfway Run were prehistorically the headwaters of Elk Creek, which is now located 3 miles (4.8 km) to the west of R.B. Winter State Park and drains the western part of Brush Valley. However, in the distant past, a right-angle tributary of Rapid Run (which at the time was confined to the Fourteenmile Narrows) cut its way back from near Seven Notch Mountain and "beheaded" the upper reaches of Elk Creek, causing the headwaters of Elk Creek to flow into Rapid Run. The capture of the headwaters of Elk Creek by Rapid Run occurred approximately one million years ago and has been described as a "blatant act of 'stream piracy'". Aggradation at the mouth of the stream once partly dammed Buffalo Creek, resulting in as much as 98 feet (30 m) of fill.

A 315-foot segment of Rapid Run contains 27 percent riffles, 33 percent runs, and 40 percent pools. Further downstream, a 340-foot segment of the stream contains 35 percent riffles, 31 percent runs, and 34 percent pools. Still further downstream, a 635-foot segment contains 25 percent riffles, 21 percent runs, and 54 percent pools.

The approximate summer mean temperature in Rapid Run is 10 °C (50 °F).

== Watershed ==
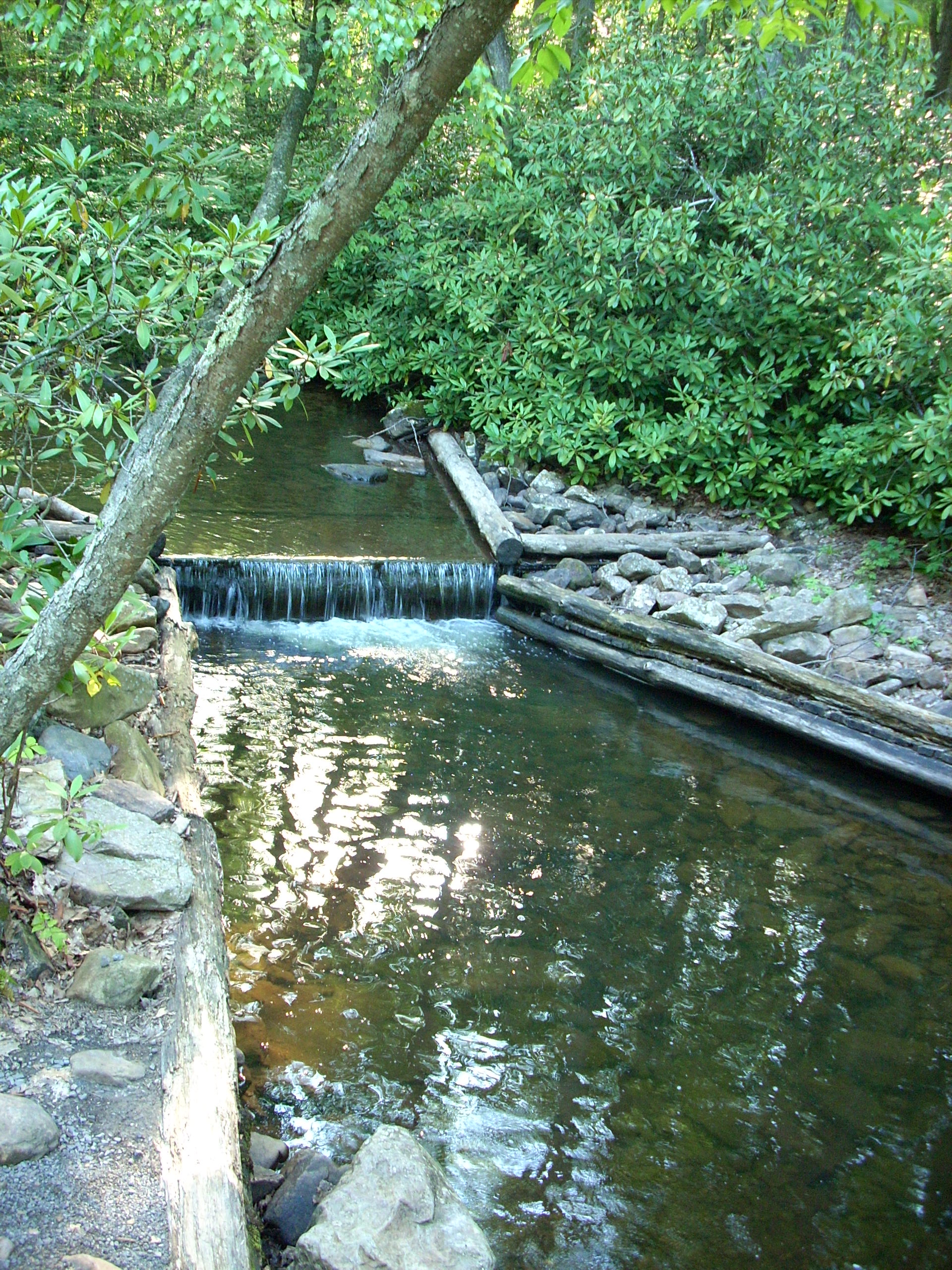
Dam on Rapid Run

The watershed of Rapid Run has an area of 18.7 square miles (48 km^{2}). The mouth of the stream is in the United States Geological Survey quadrangle of Mifflinburg. However, its source is in the quadrangle of Hartleton. The stream is one of the major tributaries to Buffalo Creek. Its watershed makes up 14 percent of the Buffalo Creek drainage basin. There are a total of 30.0 miles (48.3 km) of streams in the watershed, of which 3.0 miles (4.8 km) are on agricultural land.

A total of 88 percent of the watershed of Rapid Run is on forested land. Another 7 percent is on agricultural land and 2 percent is on impervious surfaces. However, the portion of land on impervious surfaces could rise to 7 percent in the future. The only part of the watershed where agricultural land is predominant is the area in the vicinity of the stream's impaired tributary. The main stem and all of its other tributaries are on forested land. There are 28 acres (11 ha) of no-till conversions in the watershed.

The agricultural land in the watershed of Rapid Run includes 544 acres (220 ha) of row crops and 482 acres (195 ha) of hay and pastures. A total of 242 acres (98 ha) of agricultural land is on slopes of more than 3 percent. The watershed contains 1.0 mile (1.6 km) of unpaved roads. The headwaters of the stream are in a swampy area.

Pennsylvania Route 192 runs alongside Rapid run for much of its length. For this reason, access to the stream is easy.

== History ==
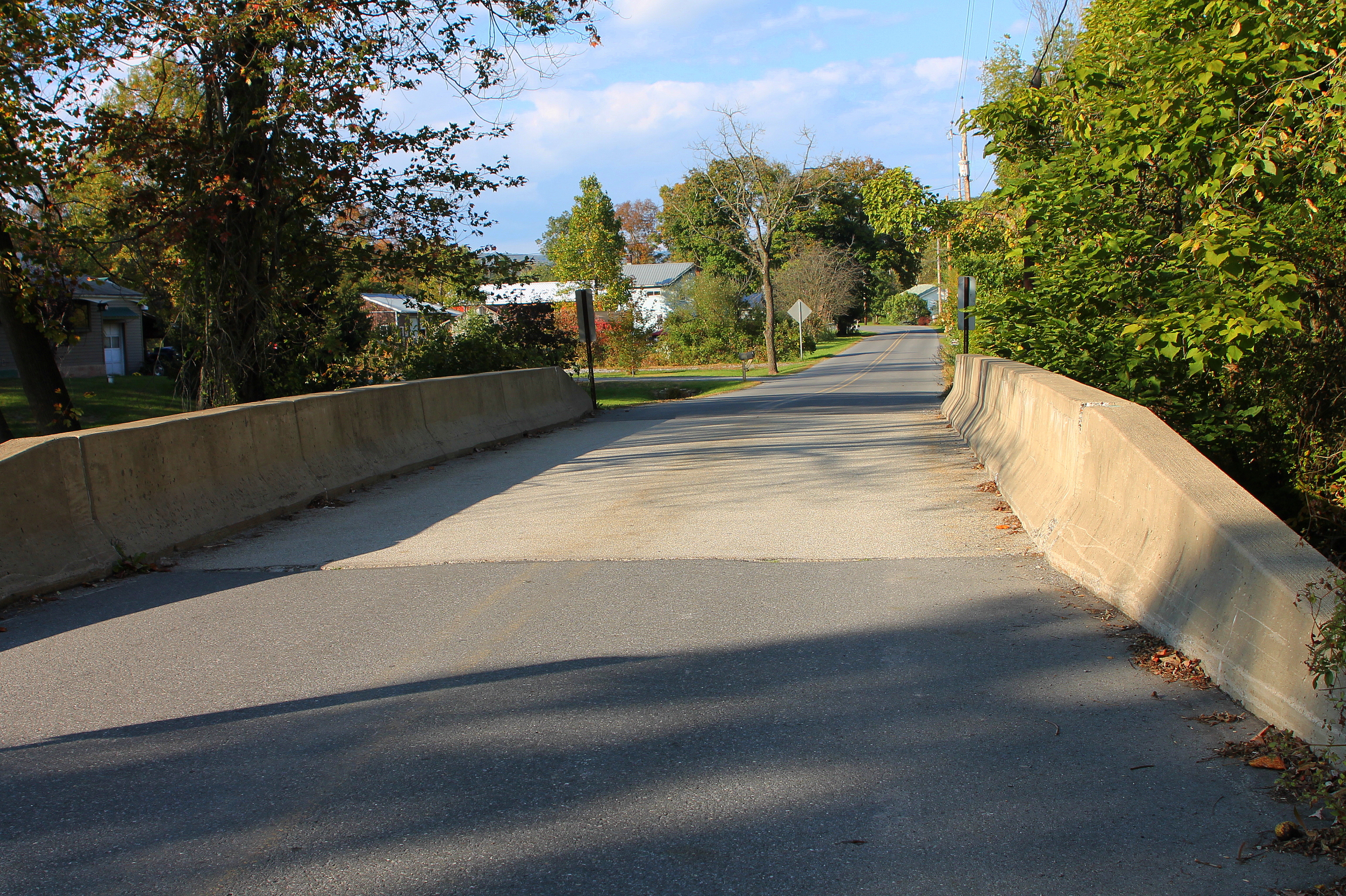
Bridge over Rapid Run near Cowan

Rapid Run was entered into the Geographic Names Information System on August 2, 1979. Its identifier in the Geographic Names Information System is 1193170. The stream is also known as Yankee Run. This name appears in Place Names of Centre County Pennsylvania: A Geographical Analysis, which was published in 1969.

Daniel Reish of Berks County, Pennsylvania settled in the vicinity of Rapid Run in Forest Hill in 1820 and constructed a sawmill, gristmill, and distillery. In the 1920s and 1930s, some people used dynamite to capture fish in Rapid Run. When the logging industry in the area was active, a log dam and a sawmill were constructed on the stream where Halfway Lake currently is. The first stone dam ever built by the Civilian Conservation Corps impounds Halfway Lake on Rapid Run.

A bridge carrying T-400 over Rapid Run was built in 1916 and repaired in 1954. A bridge carrying Pennsylvania Route 192 over the stream was built 4 miles (6.4 km) north of Cowan in 1932 and repaired in 1987. A bridge carrying T-383/Walbash Road was built over the stream at End of Narrows in 1935 and repaired in 1958. Another bridge carrying Pennsylvania Route 192 was constructed across the stream in 1936. Three more bridges carrying that highway were built in 1938 and 1939 and repaired in 1986 and 1987. A two-span bridge carrying State Route 1002 was built over the stream 3 miles (4.8 km) west of Mazeppa in 1965. A bridge carrying State Route 3009 was built across the stream northwest of Cowan in 1973 and another bridge carrying that road was built over Rapid Run in Cowan in 1994.

The Pennsylvania American Water Company historically owned lands along Rapid Run and considered using the stream as a water supply. However, they eventually sold the land. There are 1,009 feet (308 m) of field lane improvement projects in the watershed. In a 2008 report, the watershed of Rapid Run was ranked fifth amongst sub-watersheds in the Buffalo Creek drainage basin for restoration priority.

== Biology ==
The drainage basin of Rapid Run is designated as a High-Quality Coldwater Fishery and a Migratory Fishery. Wild trout naturally reproduce in the stream from its headwaters downstream to its mouth. It is considered by the Pennsylvania Fish and Boat Commission to be Class A Wild Trout Waters for brown trout from Buffalo Trail downstream to T-383, a distance of 4.5 miles (7.2 km). Brook trout also inhabit the stream. It has also been stocked with fish.

Rapid Run has a population of benthic macroinvertebrates that has been described as "healthy". Additionally, a freshwater sponge known as Spongilla fragilis has been observed in the stream, but only near the Halfway Dam. It is likely that physical factors, as opposed to chemical ones, restrict their range. In 2012, the Pennsylvania Fish and Boat Commission found two eels in Rapid Run, approximately 12 miles (19 km) upstream of any eel stocking locations. The eels were between 280 and 330 millimeters (11 and 13 in) in length.

There is a second-growth forest consisting mainly of pine and hemlock. The forest has been described as "pristine".

The monthly pathogen load in Rapid Run is 5.907 × 10^{15} organisms per month. Urban areas contribute 5.579 × 10^{15} organisms per month and farm animals contribute 3.210 × 10^{14} organisms per month. Wildlife contributes 3.713 × 10^{15} organisms per month and septic systems contribute 3.704 × 10^{15}.

== Recreation ==
Rapid Run has been described as a "high quality" stream with "excellent" angling opportunities. The headwaters of the stream are in Bald Eagle State Forest. A reach of it is in R.B. Winter State Park and another reach is in Sand Bridge State Park. A hiking trail in the latter park also crosses the stream.

According to Mike Sanja's 1988 book Pennsylvania Trout & Salmon Fishing Guide, the best fishing on Rapid Run is in its lower 1.1 miles (1.8 km).

== See also ==
- Stony Run (Buffalo Creek), next tributary of Buffalo Creek going downstream
- North Branch Buffalo Creek, next tributary of Buffalo Creek going upstream
- List of rivers of Pennsylvania
