= R. B. =

R. B. may refer to:

- R. B. (nickname)
- R. B. Winter State Park, park in Pennsylvania

== See also ==
- Rb (disambiguation)
