= RB =

RB or Rb may stand for:

== People ==
- R. B. (nickname)
- Rebecca Black, an American pop singer
- Richard Blackwood, a British rapper

== Places ==
- R. B. Winter State Park, a park in Pennsylvania
- Rancho Bernardo, a community in San Diego, California, United States

== Arts and entertainment ==
- Rhythm and blues, a music genre combining blues, gospel and jazz influences
- Rock Band, a music video game series
- Rock Band (video game), the game of the same name
- Ultraman R/B, a Japanese television series

== Businesses ==
- Rankin/Bass, an American production company, known for its seasonal television specials
- Ray-Ban, a sunglasses company
- Reckitt Benckiser, a company in the United Kingdom
- Red Bull, an Austrian energy drink brand
- Syrian Arab Airlines (IATA airline code RB)

== Government and politics ==
- Radio Bremen, a public broadcaster for the German state of Bremen
- Railway Bureau (disambiguation), any government agencies for railway of several countries
- Parti de la Renaissance du Bénin or Benin Rebirth Party, a political party in Benin
- República Bolivariana, Spanish-language phrase for the type of government in Venezuela
- Rupiah Banda, President of Zambia

== Science and technology ==
- .rb, the file extension for documents created in Ruby or in REAL Basic
- Rebar (short for reinforcing bar), used in reinforced concrete structures
- Retinoblastoma, a childhood cancer of the eyes caused by a mutation in the retinoblastoma protein
- Retinoblastoma protein, a tumor suppressor protein
- Rubidium, symbol Rb, a chemical element
- Reflected binary code, Gray code
- Romano-British culture, an archaeological culture
- Request Block, a task-related control block in OS/360 and successors.

=== Vehicles and transportation ===
- Hyundai RB (buses), a series of Korean buses
- SJ Rb, a Swedish locomotive
- Nissan RB engine, a gasoline engine made by Nissan
- Rail Baltica, railway network across the Baltic states
- Re-entry body, the US Air Force term for a re-entry vehicle
- Regionalbahn, a type of train in Germany
- Réseau Breton, a French railway network in Brittany

== Sport ==
- Racing Bulls, Formula One racing team
- RB Leipzig, German football club
- Right back, a defensive position in association football
- Running back, a position in North America football

== Other uses ==
- Rowboat

== See also ==
- Royal Bank (disambiguation)
