= Halfway Lake =

Halfway Lake may refer to:

== In Canada ==
- Halfway Lake, Alberta, a locality in Alberta
- Halfway Lake (Nova Scotia), a lake of Halifax Regional Municipality
- Halfway Lake Provincial Park, in Sudbury District in northeastern Ontario

== In the United States ==
- Halfway Lake (Pennsylvania), a lake in Hartley Township, Union County
- Halfway Lake National Wildlife Refuge, in North Dakota
