= Halfway Run Natural Area =

Natural area in Pennsylvania

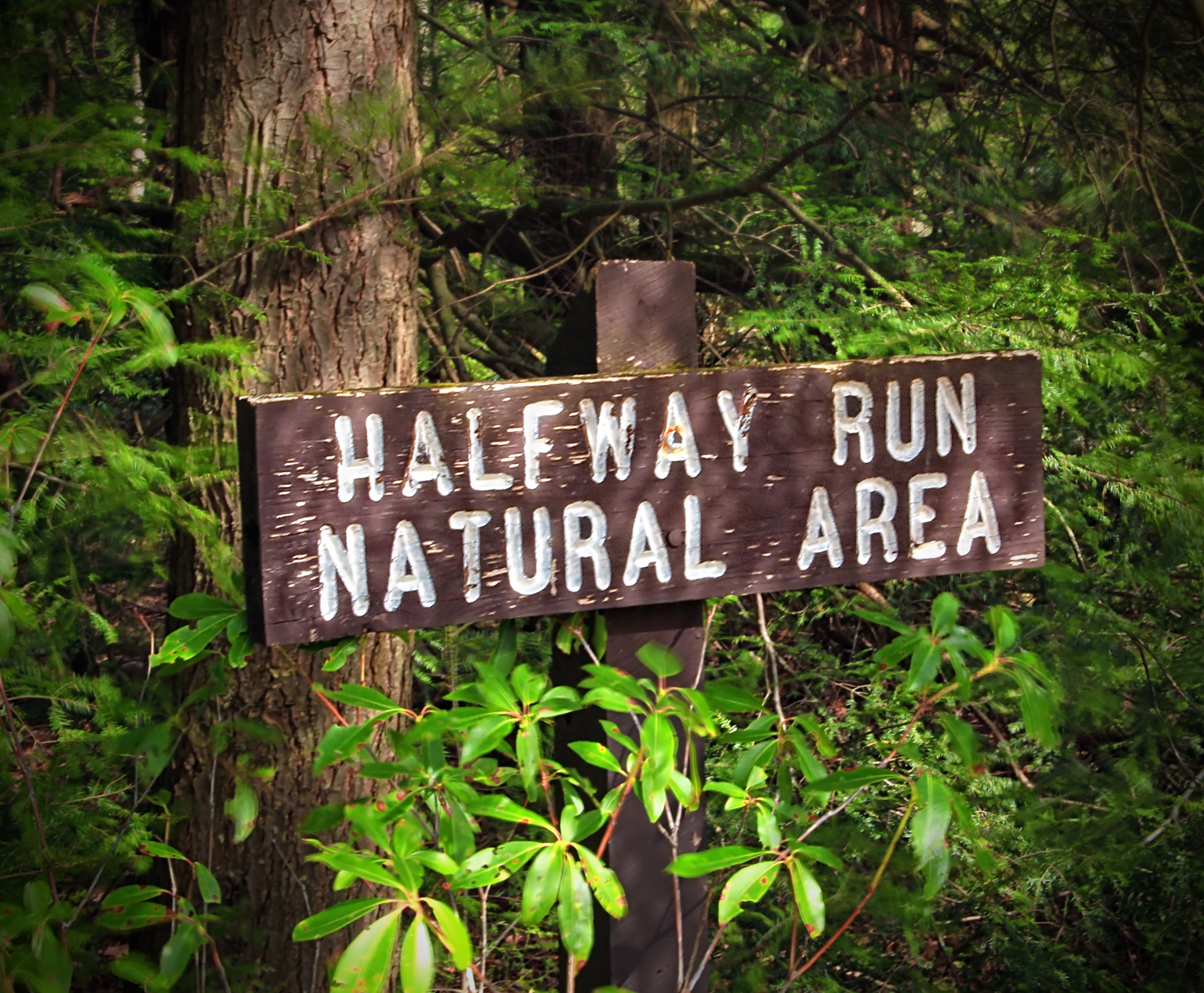

- Location within Pennsylvania
- Location: Union County, Pennsylvania
- Nearest town: Rebersburg
- Coordinates: 40°59′48″N 77°10′41″W
- Area: 407 acres (165 ha)

Halfway Run Natural Area is a 407-acre (165 ha) protected area in Centre County, Pennsylvania, United States. It is part of Bald Eagle State Forest, and is a short distance from R.B. Winter State Park.

== Description ==
The area protects a glaciated landscape of a type uncommon for Central Pennsylvania, along both banks of Halfway Run, which has been designated as a stream of unimpaired quality. The area is known for numerous pingo scars from the age of glaciation, in the form of ponds filling pits that formed when small ice-covered hills collapsed. Wild trout naturally reproduce in Halfway Run, and in springtime various branches of the stream contribute to vernal pools that are breeding spots for amphibians.
