= Yankee Run =

- Etymology: Benjamin Strawbridge, a Yankee

Physical characteristics
- Source
  - location: valley in a mountain in Miles Township, Pennsylvania
  - elevation: between 1,780 and 1,800 feet (540 and 550 m)
- Mouth
  - location: Rapid Run in Miles Township, Pennsylvania
  - coordinates: 40°59′06″N 77°13′33″W
  - elevation: 1,594 ft (486 m)
- Length: 1.0 mi (1.6 km)
- Basin size: 0.83 sq mi (2.1 km^{2})

Basin features
- Progression: Rapid Run → Buffalo Creek → West Branch Susquehanna River → Susquehanna River → Chesapeake Bay
- Tributaries
  - right: one unnamed tributary

Yankee Run is a tributary of Rapid Run in Centre County, Pennsylvania, in the United States. It is approximately 1.0 mile (1.6 km) long and flows through Miles Township. The watershed of the stream has an area of 0.83 square miles (2.1 km^{2}). It is a small stream and is named after Benjamin Strawbridge. Wild trout naturally reproduce within it.

== Course ==
Yankee Run begins in a valley in a mountain in Miles Township. It flows west-southwest through the valley for several tenths of a mile before turning south. The stream receives a very short unnamed tributary from the right and enters a much larger valley, where it crosses Pennsylvania Route 192. A short distance further downstream, it reaches its confluence with Rapid Run.

Yankee Run joins Rapid Run 13.34 miles (21.47 km) upstream of its mouth.

=== Tributaries ===
Yankee Run has no named tributaries. However, it does have an unnamed tributary, which joins Yankee Run 0.39 miles (0.63 km) upstream of its mouth.

== Geography and geology ==
The elevation near the mouth of Yankee Run is 1,594 feet (486 m) above sea level. The elevation of the stream's mouth is between 1,780 and 1,800 feet (540 and 550 m) above sea level.

Yankee Run is located to the south of McCall Mountain and to the east of Hough Mountain. The stream is located near the Brush Valley Narrows. It was described in John Blair Linn's book History of Centre and Clinton Counties as a "little stream".

== Watershed and biology ==
The watershed of Yankee Run has an area of 0.83 square miles (2.1 km^{2}). The stream is entirely within the United States Geological Survey quadrangle of Hartleton.

Wild trout naturally reproduce in Yankee Run from its headwaters downstream to its mouth. Additionally, its unnamed tributary is being considered for wild trout designation.

== History ==
Yankee Run was entered into the Geographic Names Information System on August 2, 1979. Its identifier in the Geographic Names Information System is 1191857. Rapid Run, which Yankee Run is a tributary of, is also known as Yankee Run in some sources.

Benjamin Strawbridge, an early settler in the Brush Valley, settled in the vicinity of Yankee Run after inhabiting a number of places in the valley. The stream is named after Strawbridge, who, is described as a Yankee in John Blair Linn's book History of Centre and Clinton Counties.

The unnamed tributary to Yankee Run was surveyed by the Pennsylvania Fish and Boat Commission on July 16, 2013.

== See also ==
- Halfway Run, next tributary of Rapid Run going downstream
- List of rivers of Pennsylvania
