= Sand Bridge State Park =

State park in Union County, Pennsylvania

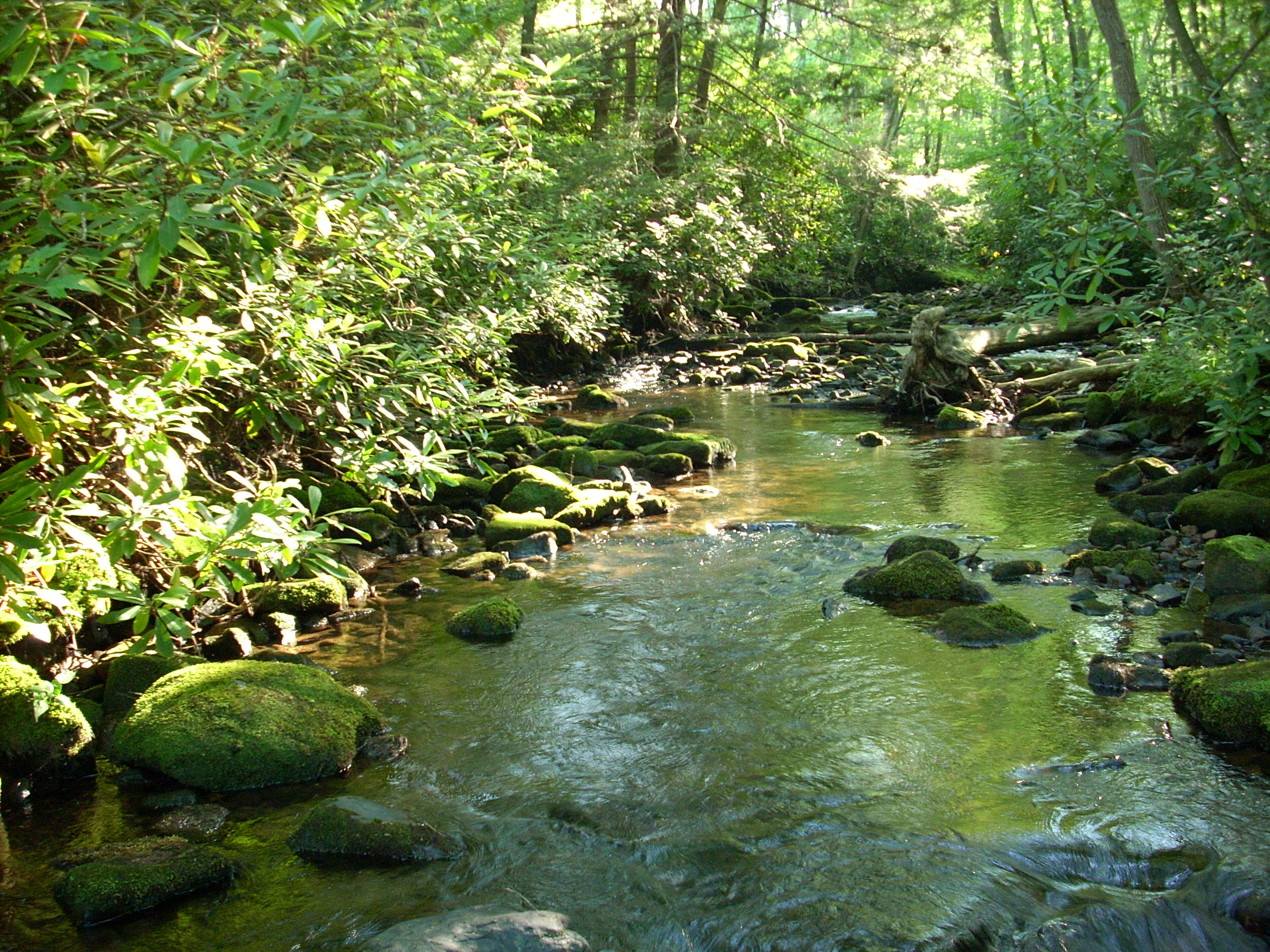
- Rapid Run

- Location within Pennsylvania Location within the United States
- Interactive map of Sand Bridge State Park
- Location: Lewis Township, Union County, Pennsylvania, United States
- Coordinates: 40°59′14″N 77°07′36″W
- Area: 3 acres (1.2 ha)
- Elevation: 1,572 feet (479 m)
- Established: 1978
- Administrator: Pennsylvania Department of Conservation and Natural Resources
- Website: Official website
- Pennsylvania State Parks

Sand Bridge State Park is a Pennsylvania state park on 3 acres (0.01 km^{2}) in Lewis Township, Union County, Pennsylvania in the United States. The park is the smallest state park in Pennsylvania and consists of a picnic area just off Pennsylvania Route 192. It has three picnic pavilions that were built by the Civilian Conservation Corps during the Great Depression. Rapid Run, a trout stream that is stocked by the Pennsylvania Fish and Boat Commission, flows through Sand Bridge State Park. The park attracted 17,000 visitors in 2008. The name Sand Bridge remains a mystery. No one, according to the parks official website knows why the area is known as Sand Bridge. The park is surrounded by Bald Eagle State Forest and became a Pennsylvania State park in 1978.
