= Millmont Red Bridge =

- U.S. National Register of Historic Places
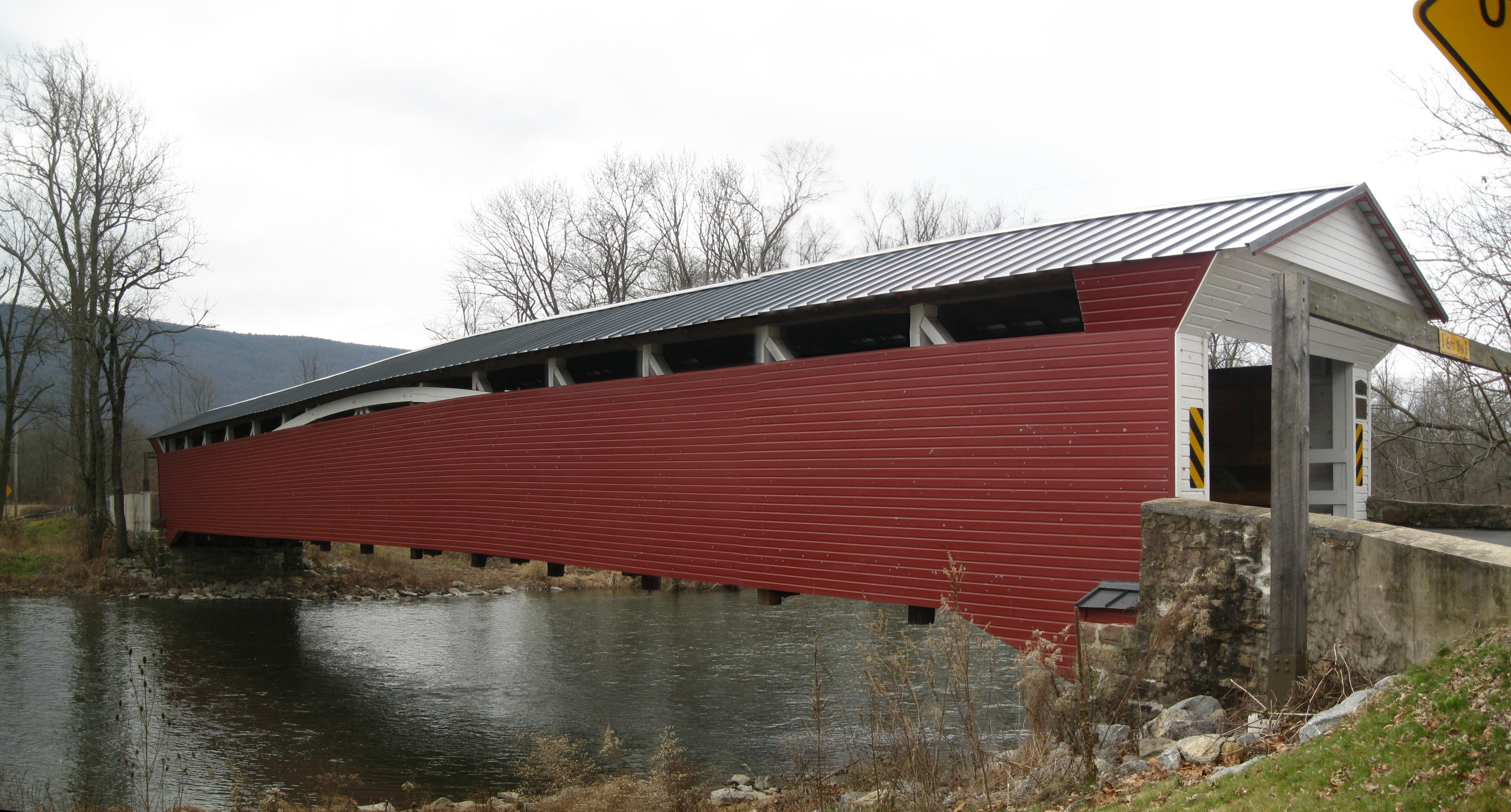
- The bridge in December 2012

- Location within Pennsylvania Location within the United States
- Location: Southwest of Millmont on Legislative Route 59005, Hartley Township, Pennsylvania
- Coordinates: 40°52′41″N 77°9′21″W
- Area: 0.1 acres (0.040 ha)
- Built: 1855
- Architectural style: Burr Type
- MPS: Union County Covered Bridges TR
- NRHP reference No.: 80003644
- Added to NRHP: February 8, 1980

Millmont Red Bridge is a historic wooden covered bridge in Hartley Township, Union County, Pennsylvania. It is a 131-foot-long (40 m), Burr Truss bridge, constructed in 1855. It crosses the Penns Creek. The bridge is no longer open to motor vehicles but foot traffic is permitted.

It was listed on the National Register of Historic Places in 1980.
