= R. B. (nickname) =

R. B. is a nickname. Notable people with the nickname include:

- R. B. Bennett (1870–1947), Canadian lawyer
- R. B. Braithwaite (1900–1990), English philosopher
- R. B. Choudary (1892–1959), Indian film producer
- R. B. Fell (1859–1934), 4th Commander of the Ceylon Defence Force
- R. B. Greaves (1943–2012), American singer
- R. B. Kitaj (1932–2007), American artist
- R. B. Nunnery (1933–1988), American football player
- Dick Rutherford (1891–1976), American football and basketball coach

== See also ==
- R. B. D. Blakeney (1872–1952), British Army general
- R. B. Winter State Park, park in Pennsylvania
