= Railway Bureau =

Railway Bureau may refer to the government agency for railway of several countries:

- Japan: Railway Bureau (鉄道院, tetsudō-in), the government agency operating the Japanese Government Railways from 1908 to 1920.
- Japan: Railway Bureau (鉄道局, tetsudō-kyoku), the current government agency under the Ministry of Land, Infrastructure, Transport and Tourism.
- Taiwan: Railway Bureau (Chinese: 交通部鐵道局; pinyin: Jiāotōng Bù Tiědào Jú), the government agency responsible for railway-related affairs in Taiwan.
