= Halfway Lake (Pennsylvania) =

Lake in Hartley Township, Pennsylvania, United States

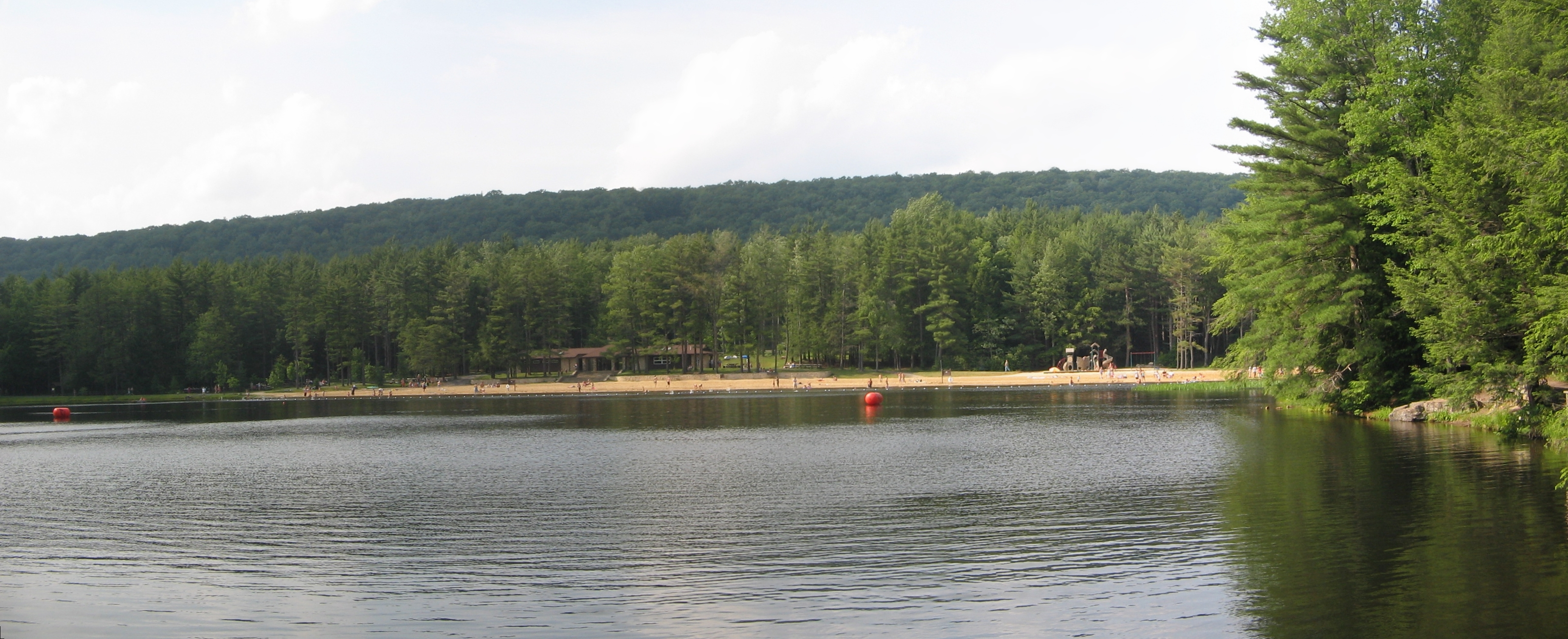

- Location within Pennsylvania Location within the United States
- Location: Hartley Township, Union County, Pennsylvania
- Coordinates: 40°59′28″N 77°11′24″W
- Basin countries: United States
- Surface elevation: 1,499 ft (457 m)

Halfway Lake is a lake in Hartley Township, Union County, Pennsylvania in the United States.

Halfway Lake is the main focus of R. B. Winter State Park. The lake is filled by spring-fed mountain streams. It was formed by a man-made sandstone dam. The water temperature is usually approximately 50 degrees F (10 degrees C) due to much of the lake being filled with water from directly underground. There is an artesian spring, Little Bubbler, that comes up through the sand on the west end of the beach at the park.

== Activities ==
Swimming is permitted, but there are no lifeguards posted at the beach as of 2008. Fishing is also permitted. The lake is a cold fishery that is stocked with brook, brown, and rainbow trout. Ice fishing is permitted when the ice is at least 4 inches (10 cm) thick.

== See also ==
- List of lakes in Pennsylvania
