= Lewis Township, Union County, Pennsylvania =

Township in Pennsylvania, US

Coordinates: 40°57′30″N 77°07′59″W

- Township
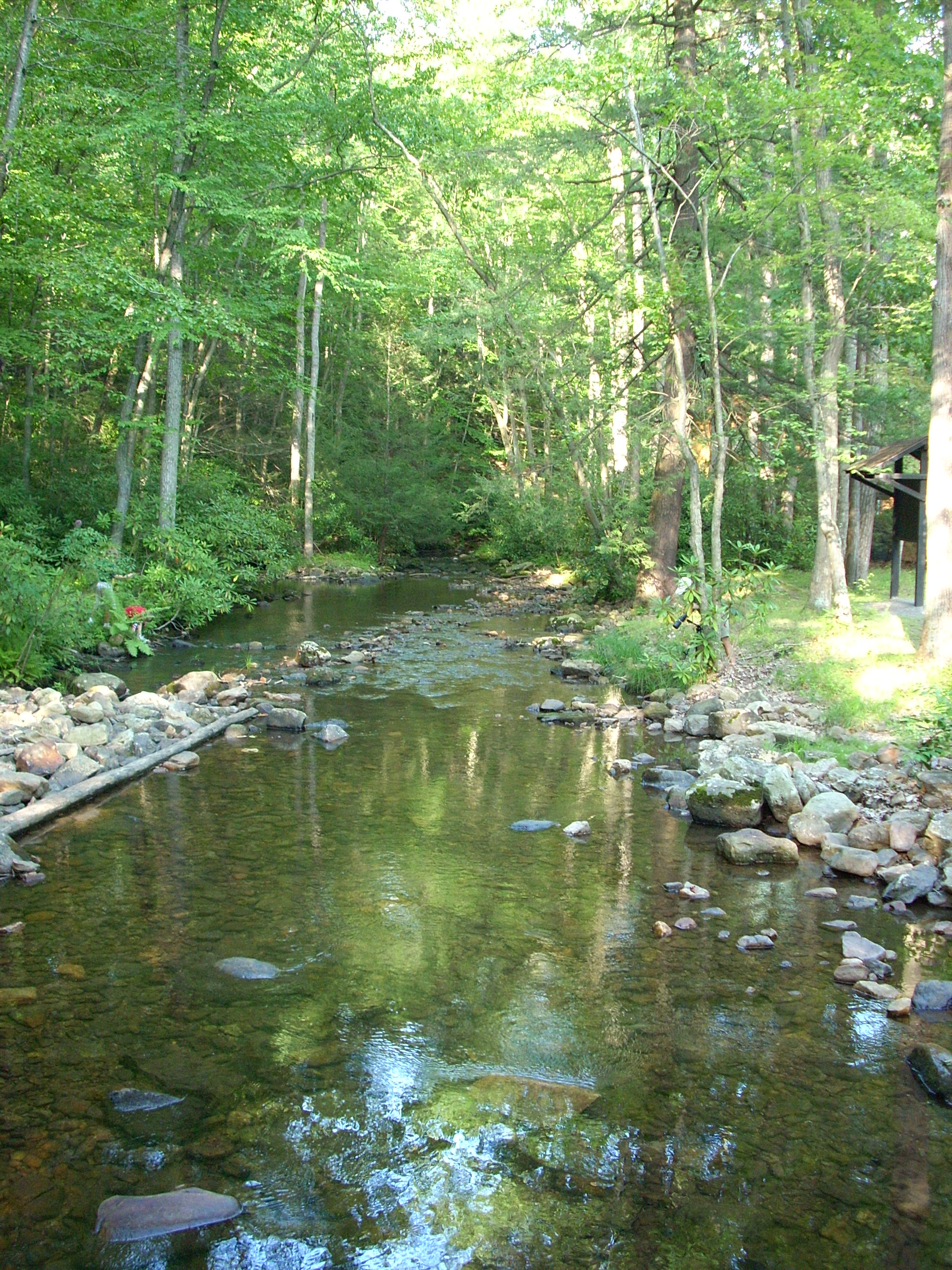
- Sand Bridge State Park is a Pennsylvania state park along Pennsylvania Route 192 in Lewis Township.

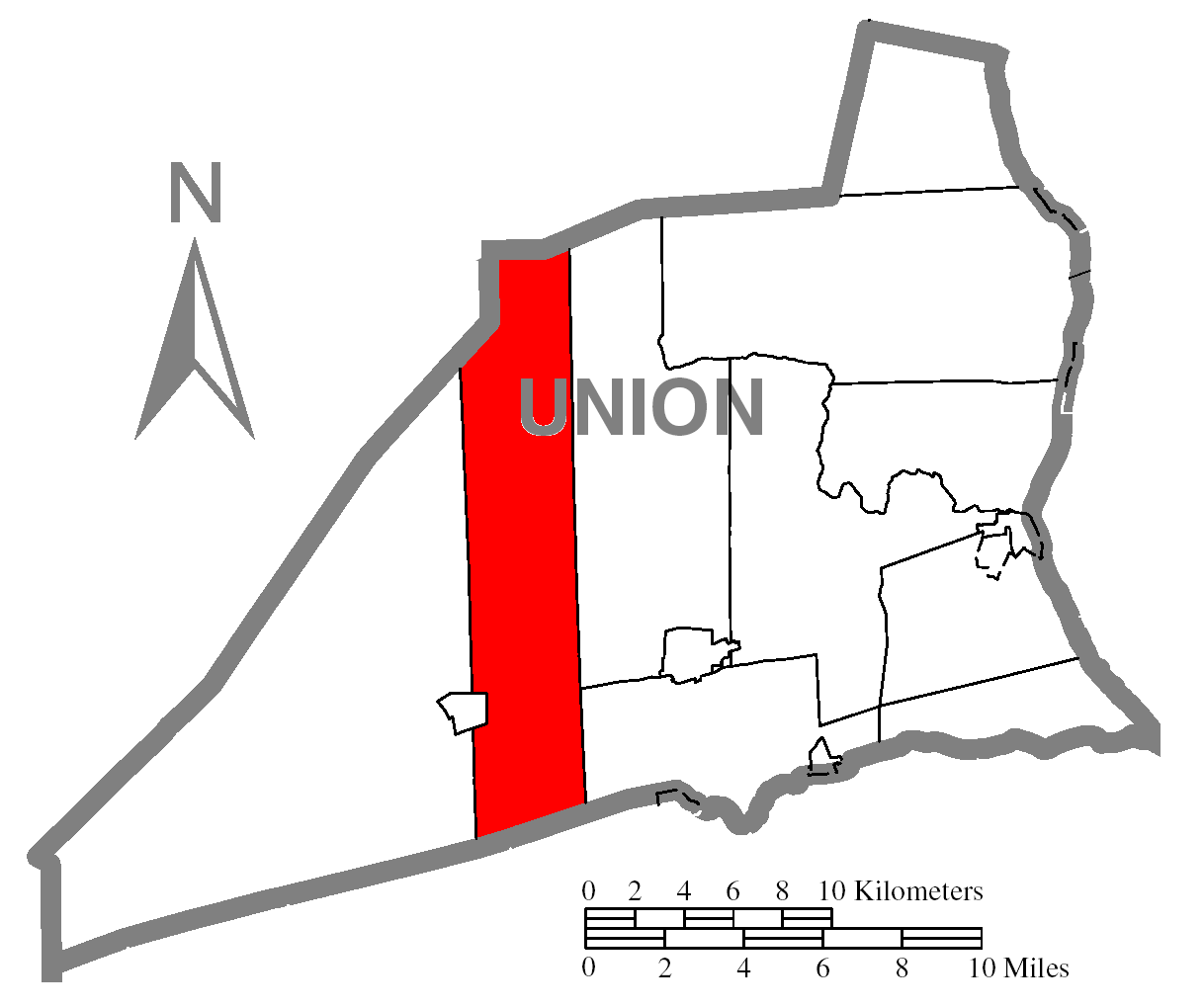
- Map of Union County, Pennsylvania highlighting Lewis Township

- Map of Pennsylvania highlighting Union County
- Country: United States
- State: Pennsylvania
- County: Union
- Settled: 1770
- Incorporated: 1857

Area
  - Total: 38.91 sq mi (100.77 km^{2})
  - Land: 38.72 sq mi (100.29 km^{2})
  - Water: 0.19 sq mi (0.48 km^{2})

Population (2020)
  - Total: 1,456 ▼
  - Estimate (2021): 1,449
  - Density: 38.3/sq mi (14.77/km^{2})
- Time zone: UTC-5 (EST)
  - Summer (DST): UTC-4 (EDT)
- FIPS code: 42-119-42960
- Website: https://lewistownshipunionco.org/

Lewis Township is a township in Union County, Pennsylvania, United States. The population was 1,456 at the 2020 census. Sand Bridge State Park, a Pennsylvania state park, is in Lewis Township along Pennsylvania Route 192.

== Geography ==
According to the United States Census Bureau, the township has a total area of 38.8 square miles (100.5 km^{2}), of which 38.7 square miles (100.3 km^{2}) is land and 0.1 square mile (0.2 km^{2}) (0.23%) is water.

Lewis Township is bordered by Lycoming County to the north, West Buffalo and Limestone Townships to the east, Snyder County to the south and Hartley Township to the west.

== Demographics ==
Historical population
Census	Pop.	Note	%±
2010	1,480		—
2020	1,456		−1.6%
2021 (est.)	1,449		−0.5%
U.S. Decennial Census

As of the census of 2000, there were 1,405 people, 477 households, and 358 families residing in the township. The population density was 36.3 inhabitants per square mile (14.0/km^{2}). There were 625 housing units at an average density of 16.1/sq mi (6.2/km^{2}). The racial makeup of the township was 98.29% White, 0.50% African American, 0.07% Native American, 0.14% Asian, 0.28% from other races, and 0.71% from two or more races. Hispanic or Latino of any race were 0.64% of the population.

There were 477 households, out of which 39.2% had children under the age of 18 living with them, 65.0% were married couples living together, 5.5% had a female householder with no husband present, and 24.9% were non-families. 18.7% of all households were made up of individuals, and 8.6% had someone living alone who was 65 years of age or older. The average household size was 2.95 and the average family size was 3.39.

In the township the population was spread out, with 32.5% under the age of 18, 8.8% from 18 to 24, 28.5% from 25 to 44, 19.0% from 45 to 64, and 11.2% who were 65 years of age or older. The median age was 32 years. For every 100 females, there were 99.6 males. For every 100 females age 18 and over, there were 95.5 males.

The median income for a household in the township was $37,031, and the median income for a family was $41,250. Males had a median income of $28,611 versus $22,941 for females. The per capita income for the township was $13,385. About 7.2% of families and 9.9% of the population were below the poverty line, including 14.7% of those under age 18 and 5.7% of those age 65 or over.

== Government ==
The township's polling place is the Lewis Township Municipal Building, (on Village Green) 116 Maple St., Millmont.
