= Hartley Township, Union County, Pennsylvania =

Township in Pennsylvania, US

Coordinates: 40°54′00″N 77°15′59″W

Hartley Township, Pennsylvania
- Township
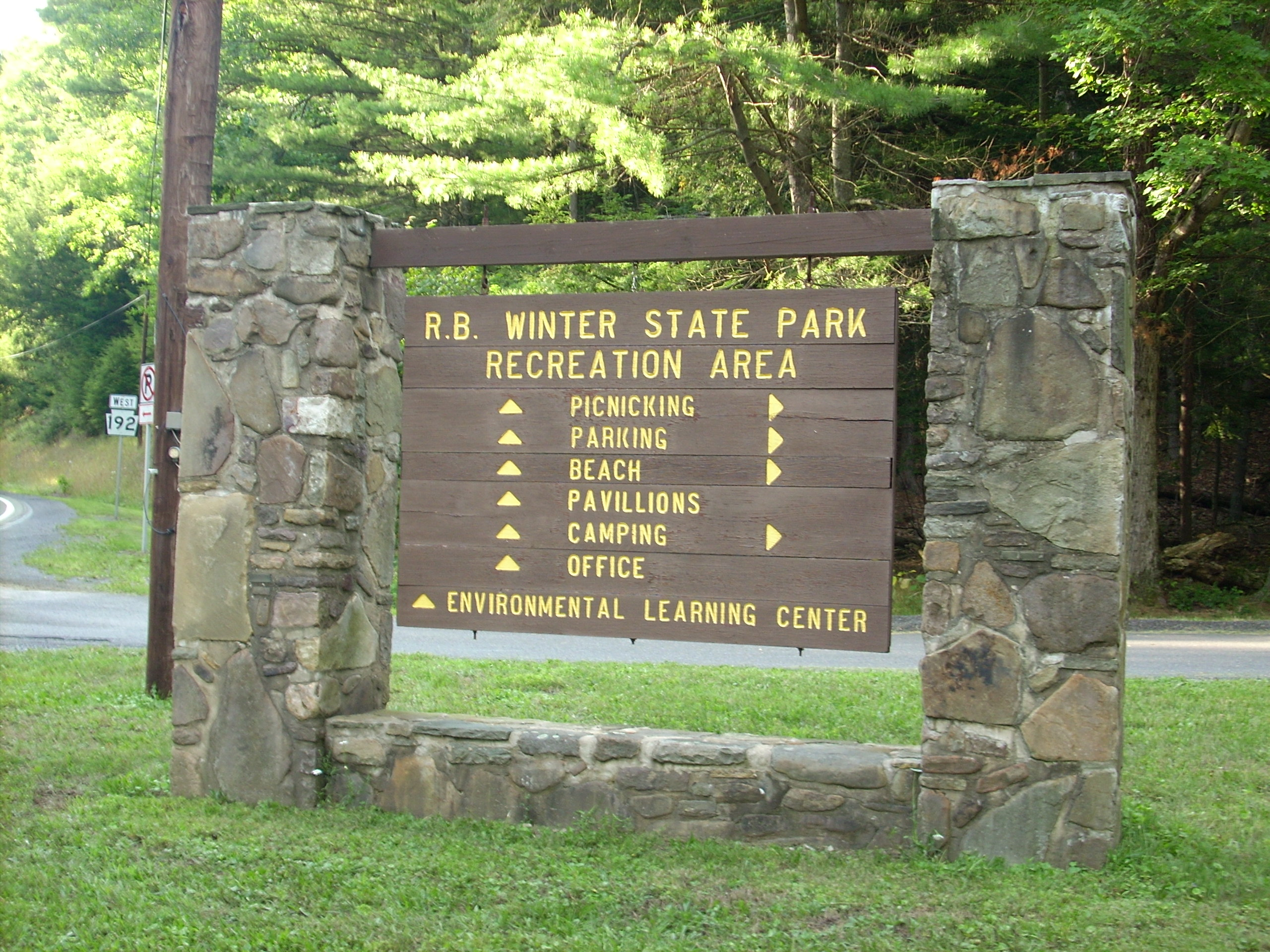
- R. B. Winter State Park a Pennsylvania state park is on Pennsylvania Route 192 in Hartley Township.

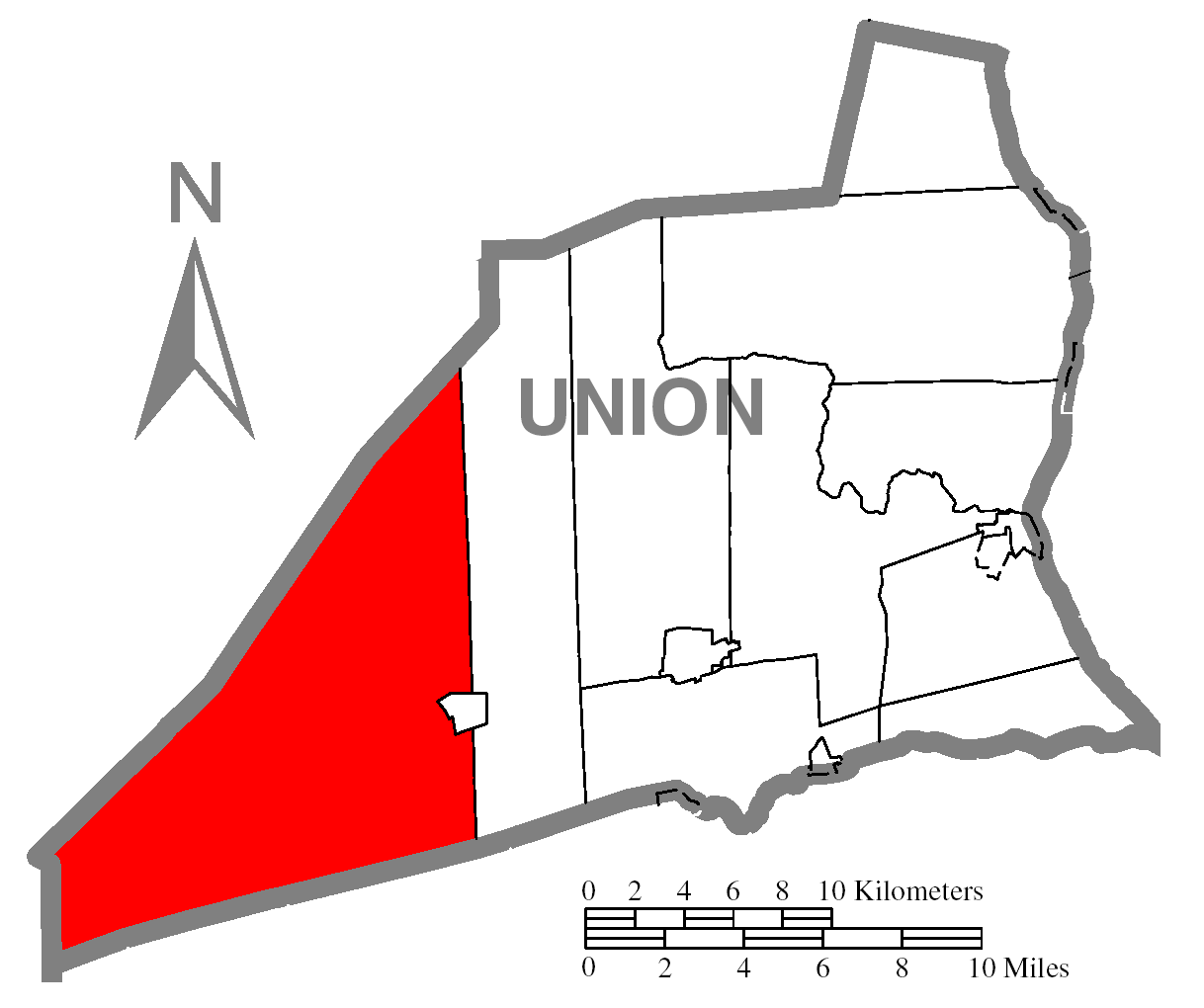
- Map of Union County, Pennsylvania highlighting Hartley Township

- Map of Pennsylvania highlighting Union County
- Country: United States
- State: Pennsylvania
- County: Union
- Settled: 1770
- Incorporated: 1811

Area
  - Total: 80.15 sq mi (207.59 km^{2})
  - Land: 79.60 sq mi (206.17 km^{2})
  - Water: 0.55 sq mi (1.42 km^{2})

Population (2020)
  - Total: 1,725 ▼
  - Estimate (2021): 1,716
  - Density: 22.9/sq mi (8.83/km^{2})
- Time zone: UTC-5 (EST)
  - Summer (DST): UTC-4 (EDT)
- FIPS code: 42-119-32952
- Website: https://hartleytownship.org/

Hartley Township is a township in Union County, Pennsylvania, United States. The population was 1,725 at the 2020 census.

The unincorporated village of Laurelton, where the office for Bald Eagle State Forest is located, is in the township. R. B. Winter State Park, one of 120 Pennsylvania state parks, is in Hartley Township.

== History ==
The Millmont Red Bridge and Halfway Lake Dam are listed on the National Register of Historic Places.

== Geography ==
According to the United States Census Bureau, the township has a total area of 79.7 square miles (206 km^{2}), of which 79.6 square miles (206 km^{2}) is land and 0.1 square miles (0.26 km^{2}) (0.15%) is water.

Hartley Township is bordered by Centre County to the northwest, Lewis Township to the east, Snyder County to the south and Mifflin County to the west.

== Demographics ==
Historical population
Census	Pop.	Note	%±
2010	1,820		—
2020	1,725		−5.2%
2021 (est.)	1,716		−0.5%
U.S. Decennial Census

As of the census of 2000, there were 1,714 people, 648 households, and 473 families residing in the township. The population density was 21.5 people per square mile (8.3/km^{2}). There were 1,139 housing units at an average density of 14.3/sq mi (5.5/km^{2}). The racial makeup of the township was 99.18% White, 0.18% African American, 0.18% Asian, 0.12% Pacific Islander, and 0.35% from two or more races. Hispanic or Latino of any race were 0.18% of the population.

There were 648 households, out of which 32.4% had children under the age of 18 living with them, 62.3% were married couples living together, 7.6% had a female householder with no husband present, and 26.9% were non-families. 22.7% of all households were made up of individuals, and 10.6% had someone living alone who was 65 years of age or older. The average household size was 2.57 and the average family size was 3.03.

In the township the population was spread out, with 25.4% under the age of 18, 6.4% from 18 to 24, 27.5% from 25 to 44, 24.9% from 45 to 64, and 15.8% who were 65 years of age or older. The median age was 39 years. For every 100 females, there were 97.0 males. For every 100 females age 18 and over, there were 99.7 males.

The median income for a household in the township was $35,278, and the median income for a family was $39,650. Males had a median income of $29,207 versus $21,591 for females. The per capita income for the township was $15,310. About 8.5% of families and 11.4% of the population were below the poverty line, including 14.5% of those under age 18 and 14.0% of those age 65 or over.

== Government ==
The polling place (voting) for the township is located in the Hartley Township Building, 1845 State RT 235., Laurelton.
