= R. B. Winter State Park =

State park in Union County, Pennsylvania

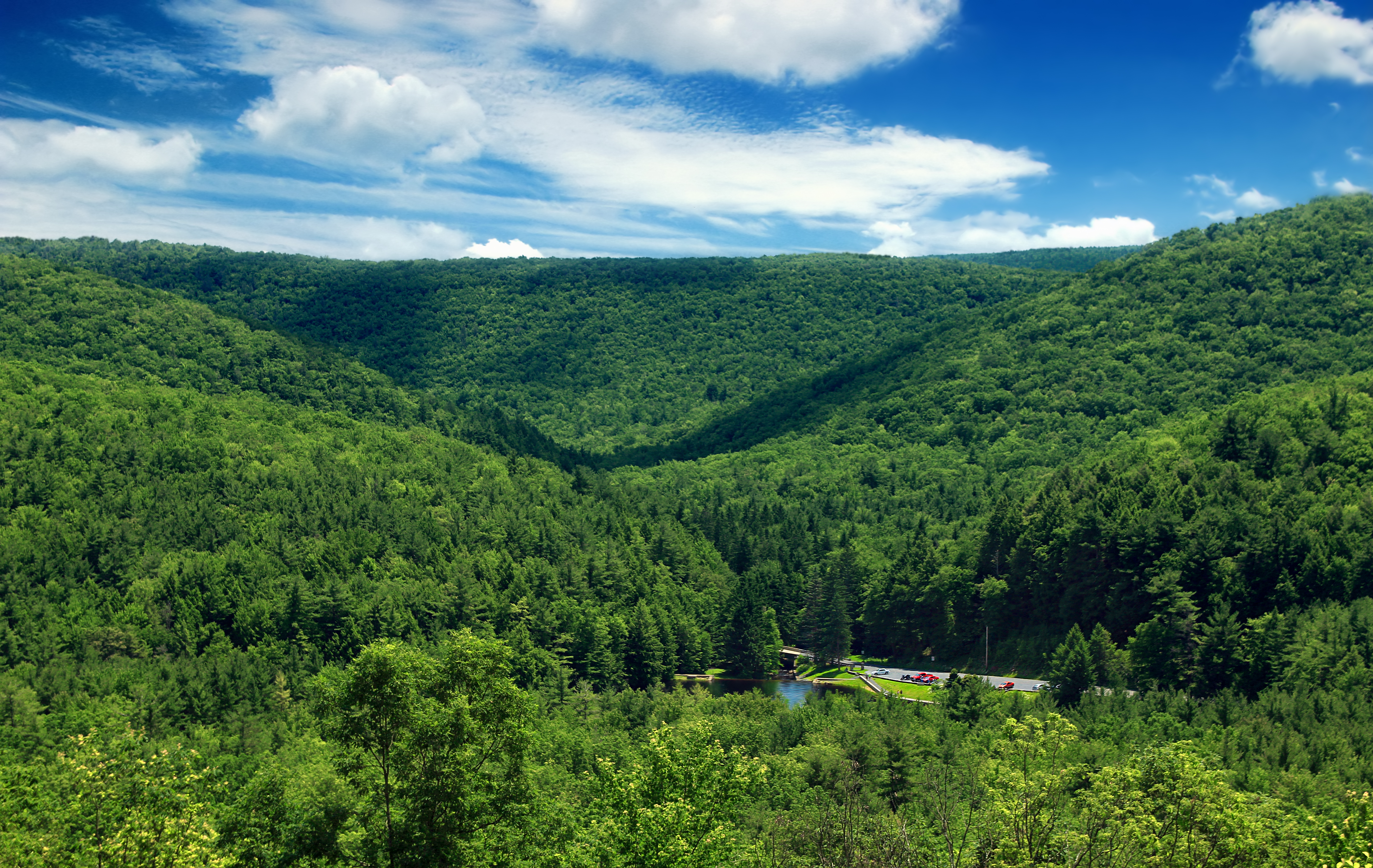

- Location within Pennsylvania Location within the United States
- Interactive map of R. B. Winter State Park
- Location: Hartley Township, Union County, Pennsylvania, United States
- Coordinates: 40°59′27″N 77°11′37″W
- Area: 695 acres (281 ha)
- Elevation: 1,565 feet (477 m)
- Established: 1933
- Administrator: Pennsylvania Department of Conservation and Natural Resources
- Website: Official website
- Pennsylvania State Parks

R. B. Winter State Park (also known as Raymond B. Winter State Park) is a Pennsylvania state park on 695 acres (281 ha) in Hartley Township, Union County, Pennsylvania in the United States. It is in the ridge and valley region of Pennsylvania and is surrounded by Bald Eagle State Forest. R. B. Winter State Park is in a shallow basin that is surrounded by ridges. Halfway Lake is the central recreational focus of the park. The park is 18 miles (29 km) west of Lewisburg on Pennsylvania Route 192.

The park was originally called "Halfway Dam State Park", but was renamed "R.B. Winter State Park" on May 23, 1957, to honor state forester Raymond Burrows Winter, who was instrumental in establishing the park and had worked there and the surrounding state forest for 45 years.

== Rapid Run Natural Area ==
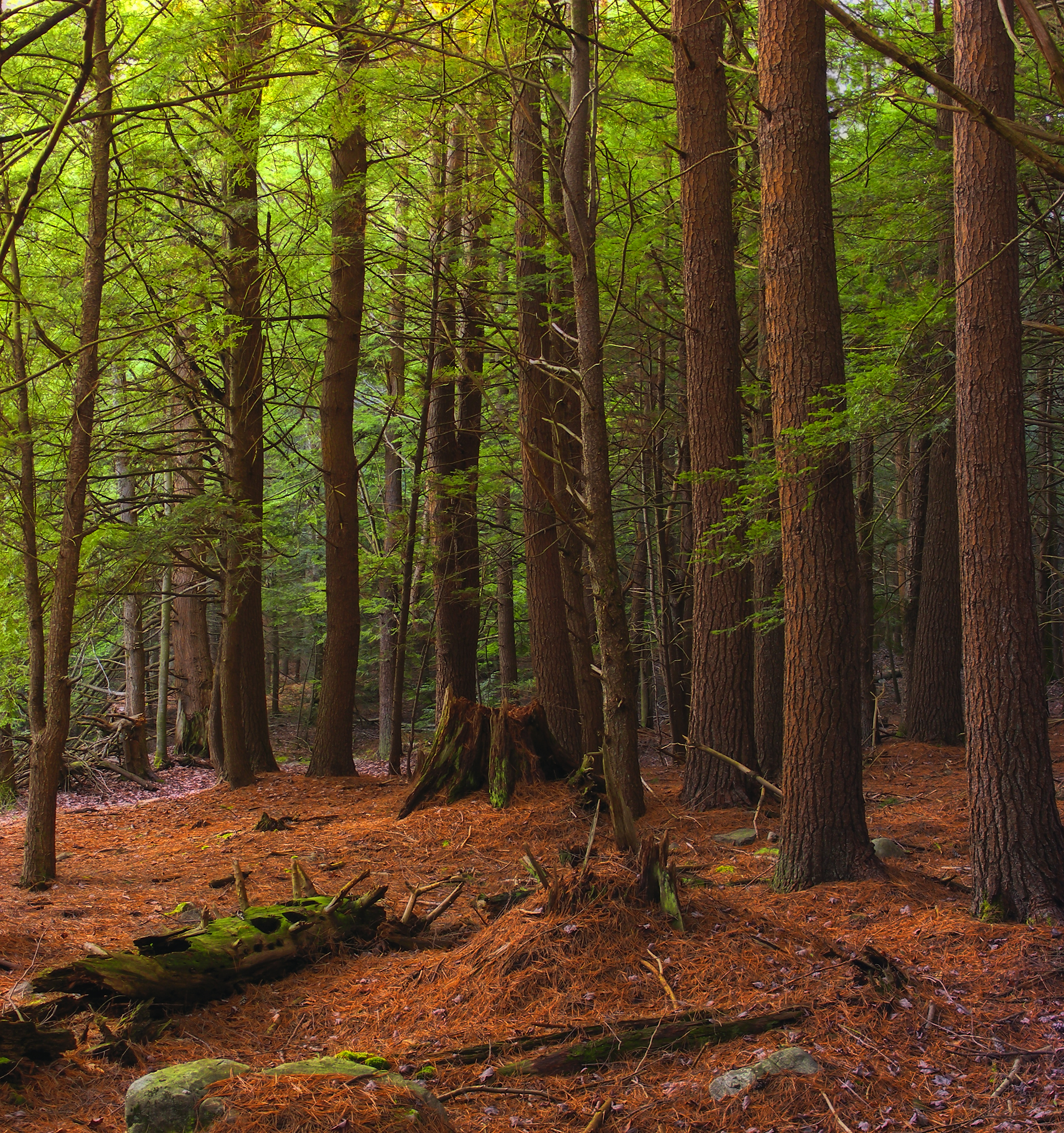
Rapid Run Natural Area

The first settlers in the area found a very dense forest that was according to Conrad Weiser, "so thick that for a mile at a time we could not find the place the size of a hand, where the sun could penetrate, even in the clearest day..." Some examples of this dense forest still stand today at R. B. Winter State Park. The Rapid Run Natural Area is 39 acres (16 ha) of land set aside "to provide a location for scientific observation of natural systems, to protect an example of a typical and unique plant and animal community, and to protect and outstanding example of natural interest and beauty." This natural area has been largely untouched since it was last logged for timber in 1850. Pileated woodpeckers can be seen in this area. Barred owls also live in the Rapid Run Natural Area. Vernal pools fill each spring to provide water for fairy shrimp, caddis-flies, spotted salamanders, and wood frogs.

== Halfway Lake ==
Halfway Lake is filled by spring fed mountain streams. It is contained by a hand-laid native sandstone dam, the first cement and stone dam ever built by the Civilian Conservation Corps. The temperature of the water in Halfway Lake is always about 50 °F (10 °C). This is because much of the lake is filled with water that comes from directly underground. Little Bubbler is an artesian spring that seeps up through the sand on the west end of the beach at R. B. Winter State Park. Swimming is permitted but lifeguards are not provided as of 2008. Halfway Lake is a cold water fishery that is stocked with brook, brown and rainbow trout. Ice fishing is permitted when the lake is frozen and the ice is at least 4 inches (10 cm) thick.

== Recreation ==
=== Camping ===
People interested in staying overnight at R. B. Winter State park have three options. They can stay at one of the 59 modern camp sites some of which are equipped with electricity. All the sites have access to modern restrooms with showers. Each camp site also has its own fire ring, picnic table and lantern holder. There are three cottages that sleep up to five people. The cottages have electric lights and a small baseboard heater as well as wooden floors, windows, skylights, porches, a picnic table and fire ring. There is one modern cabin that is available to rent year-round. It is two stories with a furnished living area, kitchen, one-and-a-half baths, four bedrooms and two porches.

=== Trails ===
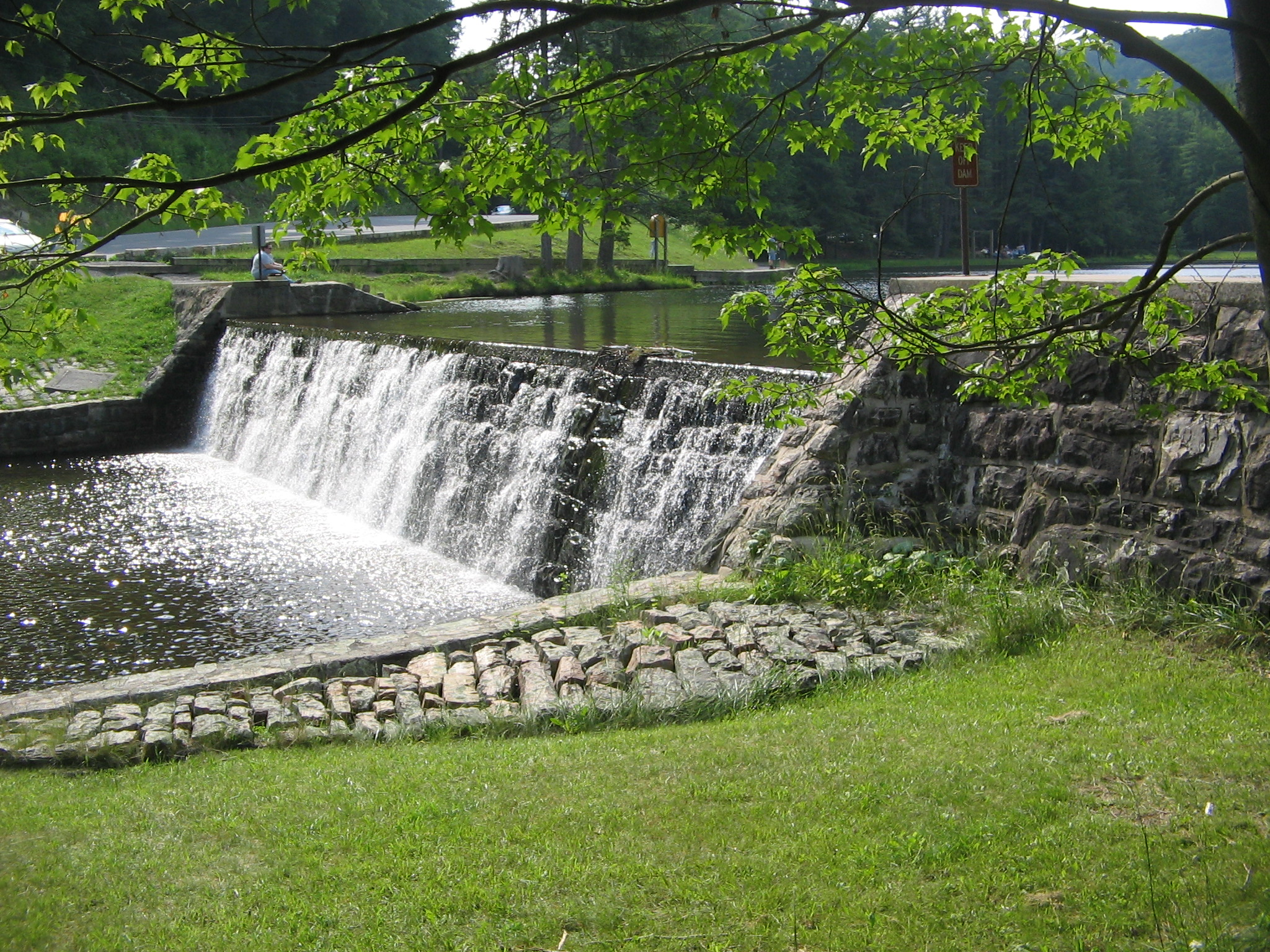
The CCC-built dam in the park

R. B. Winter State Park has 6.3 miles (10 km) of hiking trails that meander around the park and along the lakeshore. The park is also a trailhead for the hiking, mountain biking and snow mobile trails in Bald Eagle State Forest. Most of the trails in the park are open to mountain biking except for Rapid Run Trail and Mid State Trail and part of Overlook Trail. R. B. Winter State Park is open to cross-country skiing and snowmobiling during the winter months.

=== Hunting ===
Hunting is permitted on 487 acres (197 ha) of R.B. Winter State Park. Hunters are expected to follow the rules and regulations of the Pennsylvania Game Commission. The common game species are ruffed grouse, eastern gray squirrel, wild turkey, American black bear, white-tailed deer, and woodcocks. The hunting of groundhogs is prohibited.

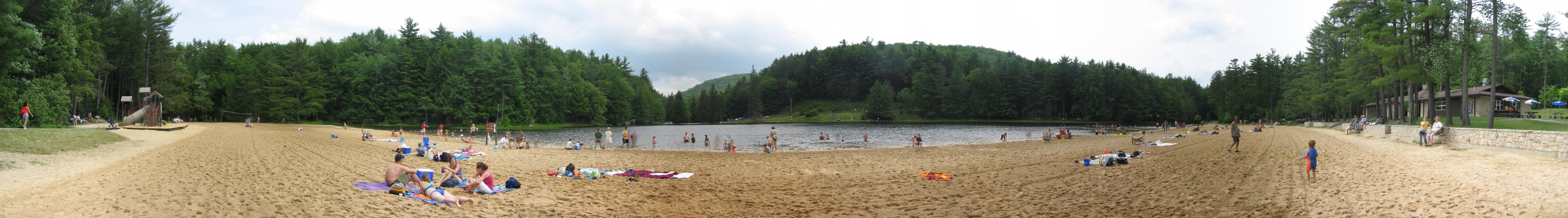
Panorama of the beach and lake at R.B. Winter State Park
